= List of butterflies of the Gambia =

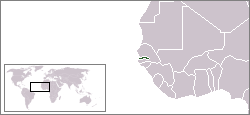
Location of the Gambia

About 173 species of butterfly are known from the Gambia, none of which are thought to be endemic.

== Papilionidae ==
=== Papilioninae ===
==== Papilionini ====
- Papilio nireus Linnaeus, 1758
- Papilio demodocus Esper, [1798]
- Papilio hesperus Westwood, 1843

==== Leptocercini ====
- Graphium angolanus baronis (Ungemach, 1932)
- Graphium leonidas (Fabricius, 1793)

== Pieridae ==
=== Coliadinae ===
- Eurema brigitta (Stoll, [1780])
- Eurema hapale (Mabille, 1882)
- Eurema hecabe solifera (Butler, 1875)
- Catopsilia florella (Fabricius, 1775)

=== Pierinae ===
- Colotis amata calais (Cramer, 1775)
- Colotis antevippe (Boisduval, 1836)
- Colotis aurora evarne (Klug, 1829)
- Colotis danae eupompe (Klug, 1829)
- Colotis euippe (Linnaeus, 1758)
- Colotis evagore antigone (Boisduval, 1836)
- Colotis ione (Godart, 1819)
- Colotis vesta amelia (Lucas, 1852)
- Colotis eris (Klug, 1829)
- Pinacopterix eriphia tritogenia (Klug, 1829)
- Nepheronia argia (Fabricius, 1775)
- Nepheronia thalassina (Boisduval, 1836)
- Leptosia alcesta (Stoll, [1782])

==== Pierini ====
- Appias epaphia (Cramer, [1779])
- Appias sylvia (Fabricius, 1775)
- Pontia glauconome Klug, 1829
- Mylothris chloris (Fabricius, 1775)
- Dixeia orbona (Geyer, [1837])
- Belenois aurota (Fabricius, 1793)
- Belenois calypso (Drury, 1773)
- Belenois creona (Cramer, [1776])
- Belenois gidica (Godart, 1819)

== Lycaenidae ==
=== Miletinae ===
==== Miletini ====
- Spalgis lemolea lemolea Druce, 1890
- Spalgis lemolea pilos Druce, 1890
- Lachnocnema emperamus (Snellen, 1872)

=== Poritiinae ===
- Cephetola subcoerulea (Roche, 1954)

=== Aphnaeinae ===
- Cigaritis buchanani (Rothschild, 1921)
- Cigaritis mozambica (Bertoloni, 1850)
- Cigaritis nilus (Hewitson, 1865)
- Axiocerses harpax (Fabricius, 1775)
- Aphnaeus orcas (Drury, 1782)

=== Theclinae ===
- Myrina silenus (Fabricius, 1775)
- Dapidodigma hymen (Fabricius, 1775)

==== Theclini ====
- Hypolycaena condamini Stempffer, 1956
- Hypolycaena philippus (Fabricius, 1793)
- Iolaus iasis Hewitson, 1865
- Iolaus menas Druce, 1890
- Iolaus lukabas Druce, 1890
- Iolaus calisto (Westwood, 1851)
- Pilodeudorix caerulea (Druce, 1890)
- Pilodeudorix diyllus occidentalis Libert, 2004
- Deudorix antalus (Hopffer, 1855)
- Deudorix dinochares Grose-Smith, 1887
- Deudorix livia (Klug, 1834)
- Deudorix lorisona abriana Libert, 2004

=== Polyommatinae ===
==== Lycaenesthini ====
- Anthene amarah (Guérin-Méneville, 1849)
- Anthene crawshayi (Butler, 1899)
- Anthene larydas (Cramer, 1780)
- Anthene lunulata (Trimen, 1894)
- Anthene nigeriae (Aurivillius, 1905)

==== Polyommatini ====
- Pseudonacaduba sichela (Wallengren, 1857)
- Lampides boeticus (Linnaeus, 1767)
- Cacyreus lingeus (Stoll, 1782)
- Leptotes babaulti (Stempffer, 1935)
- Leptotes pirithous (Linnaeus, 1767)
- Tuxentius cretosus nodieri (Oberthür, 1883)
- Tarucus rosacea (Austaut, 1885)
- Tarucus theophrastus (Fabricius, 1793)
- Tarucus ungemachi Stempffer, 1942
- Zizeeria knysna (Trimen, 1862)
- Zizina antanossa (Mabille, 1877)
- Zizula hylax (Fabricius, 1775)
- Azanus jesous (Guérin-Méneville, 1849)
- Azanus moriqua (Wallengren, 1857)
- Eicochrysops hippocrates (Fabricius, 1793)
- Euchrysops malathana (Boisduval, 1833)
- Euchrysops nilotica (Aurivillius, 1904)
- Euchrysops osiris (Hopffer, 1855)
- Chilades eleusis (Demaison, 1888)
- Freyeria trochylus (Freyer, [1843])
- Lepidochrysops synchrematiza (Bethune-Baker, [1923])

== Nymphalidae ==
=== Danainae ===
==== Danaini ====
- Danaus chrysippus alcippus (Cramer, 1777)
- Amauris damocles (Fabricius, 1793)

=== Satyrinae ===
==== Melanitini ====
- Melanitis leda (Linnaeus, 1758)
- Melanitis libya Distant, 1882

==== Satyrini ====
- Bicyclus angulosa (Butler, 1868)
- Bicyclus funebris (Guérin-Méneville, 1844)
- Bicyclus milyas (Hewitson, 1864)
- Bicyclus pavonis (Butler, 1876)
- Bicyclus sandace (Hewitson, 1877)
- Bicyclus vulgaris (Butler, 1868)
- Bicyclus zinebi (Butler, 1869)
- Ypthima asterope (Klug, 1832)
- Ypthima condamini nigeriae Kielland, 1982
- Ypthima vuattouxi Kielland, 1982
- Ypthimomorpha itonia (Hewitson, 1865)

=== Charaxinae ===
==== Charaxini ====
- Charaxes varanes vologeses (Mabille, 1876)
- Charaxes candiope (Godart, 1824)
- Charaxes protoclea Feisthamel, 1850
- Charaxes boueti Feisthamel, 1850
- Charaxes cynthia Butler, 1866
- Charaxes jasius Poulton, 1926
- Charaxes epijasius Reiche, 1850
- Charaxes castor (Cramer, 1775)
- Charaxes achaemenes atlantica van Someren, 1970
- Charaxes viola Butler, 1866

=== Nymphalinae ===
==== Nymphalini ====
- Vanessa cardui (Linnaeus, 1758)
- Junonia chorimene (Guérin-Méneville, 1844)
- Junonia hierta cebrene Trimen, 1870
- Junonia oenone (Linnaeus, 1758)
- Junonia orithya madagascariensis Guenée, 1865
- Junonia sophia (Fabricius, 1793)
- Junonia terea (Drury, 1773)
- Precis antilope (Feisthamel, 1850)
- Hypolimnas anthedon (Doubleday, 1845)
- Hypolimnas misippus (Linnaeus, 1764)
- Catacroptera cloanthe ligata Rothschild & Jordan, 1903

=== Biblidinae ===
==== Biblidini ====
- Byblia anvatara crameri Aurivillius, 1894

=== Limenitinae ===
==== Neptidini ====
- Neptis serena Overlaet, 1955

==== Adoliadini ====
- Hamanumida daedalus (Fabricius, 1775)
- Aterica galene (Brown, 1776)
- Bebearia senegalensis (Herrich-Schaeffer, 1858)
- Euphaedra medon pholus (van der Hoeven, 1840)
- Euphaedra ceres (Fabricius, 1775)

=== Heliconiinae ===
==== Acraeini ====
- Acraea camaena (Drury, 1773)
- Acraea neobule Doubleday, 1847
- Acraea quirina (Fabricius, 1781)
- Acraea zetes (Linnaeus, 1758)
- Acraea egina (Cramer, 1775)
- Acraea caecilia (Fabricius, 1781)
- Acraea pseudegina Westwood, 1852
- Acraea umbra carpenteri (Le Doux, 1937)
- Acraea bonasia (Fabricius, 1775)
- Acraea encedana Pierre, 1976
- Acraea encedon (Linnaeus, 1758)
- Acraea serena (Fabricius, 1775)

==== Vagrantini ====
- Phalanta phalantha aethiopica (Rothschild & Jordan, 1903)

== Hesperiidae ==
=== Coeliadinae ===
- Coeliades aeschylus (Plötz, 1884)
- Coeliades chalybe (Westwood, 1852)
- Coeliades forestan (Stoll, [1782])

=== Pyrginae ===
==== Celaenorrhinini ====
- Sarangesa laelius (Mabille, 1877)
- Sarangesa phidyle (Walker, 1870)
- Sarangesa tricerata (Mabille, 1891)

==== Tagiadini ====
- Tagiades flesus (Fabricius, 1781)
- Abantis nigeriana Butler, 1901

==== Carcharodini ====
- Spialia diomus (Hopffer, 1855)
- Spialia dromus (Plötz, 1884)
- Spialia spio (Linnaeus, 1764)
- Gomalia elma (Trimen, 1862)

=== Hesperiinae ===
==== Aeromachini ====
- Astictopterus abjecta (Snellen, 1872)
- Prosopalpus styla Evans, 1937
- Parosmodes morantii axis Evans, 1937
- Acleros ploetzi Mabille, 1890
- Andronymus neander (Plötz, 1884)
- Zophopetes cerymica (Hewitson, 1867)
- Zophopetes quaternata (Mabille, 1876)
- Gretna waga (Plötz, 1886)
- Platylesches affinissima Strand, 1921
- Platylesches batangae (Holland, 1894)
- Platylesches galesa (Hewitson, 1877)
- Platylesches moritili (Wallengren, 1857)
- Platylesches picanini (Holland, 1894)

==== Baorini ====
- Pelopidas mathias (Fabricius, 1798)
- Borbo borbonica (Boisduval, 1833)
- Borbo fallax (Gaede, 1916)
- Borbo fanta (Evans, 1937)
- Borbo fatuellus (Hopffer, 1855)
- Borbo gemella (Mabille, 1884)
- Borbo micans (Holland, 1896)
- Borbo perobscura (Druce, 1912)
- Parnara monasi (Trimen & Bowker, 1889)
- Gegenes hottentota (Latreille, 1824)
- Gegenes niso brevicornis (Plötz, 1884)
- Gegenes pumilio gambica (Mabille, 1878)

== See also ==
- List of moths of the Gambia
- Wildlife of the Gambia
- Geography of the Gambia
- Guinean forest-savanna mosaic
