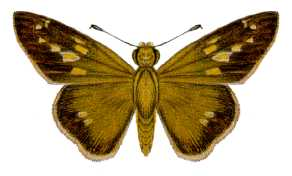

Scientific classification
- Kingdom: Animalia
- Phylum: Arthropoda
- Class: Insecta
- Order: Lepidoptera
- Family: Hesperiidae
- Genus: Borbo
- Species: B. impar

Binomial name
- Borbo impar (Mabille, 1883)

Synonyms
- Baoris lavinia Waterhouse, 1932; Caltoris laraca Swinhoe, 1907; Carystus tetragraphus Mabille, 1891; Pamphila impar Mabille, 1883; Parnara bipunctata Elwes & J. Edwards, 1897; Parnara sidata Fruhstorfer, 1911; Pelopidas lavella Evans, 1937; Baoris impar

= Borbo impar =

Yellow swift

Species of butterfly

Borbo impar, the yellow swift, is a butterfly of the family Hesperiidae. It is found from the Northern Territory of Australia and Indonesia to the Solomons

The wingspan is 30–40 mm.

The larvae feed on Poaceae species, including Panicum maximum, Pennisetum pedicellatum and Rottboellia cochinensis.

== Subspecies ==
- Borbo impar impar
- Borbo impar lavinia (Waterhouse, 1932)
