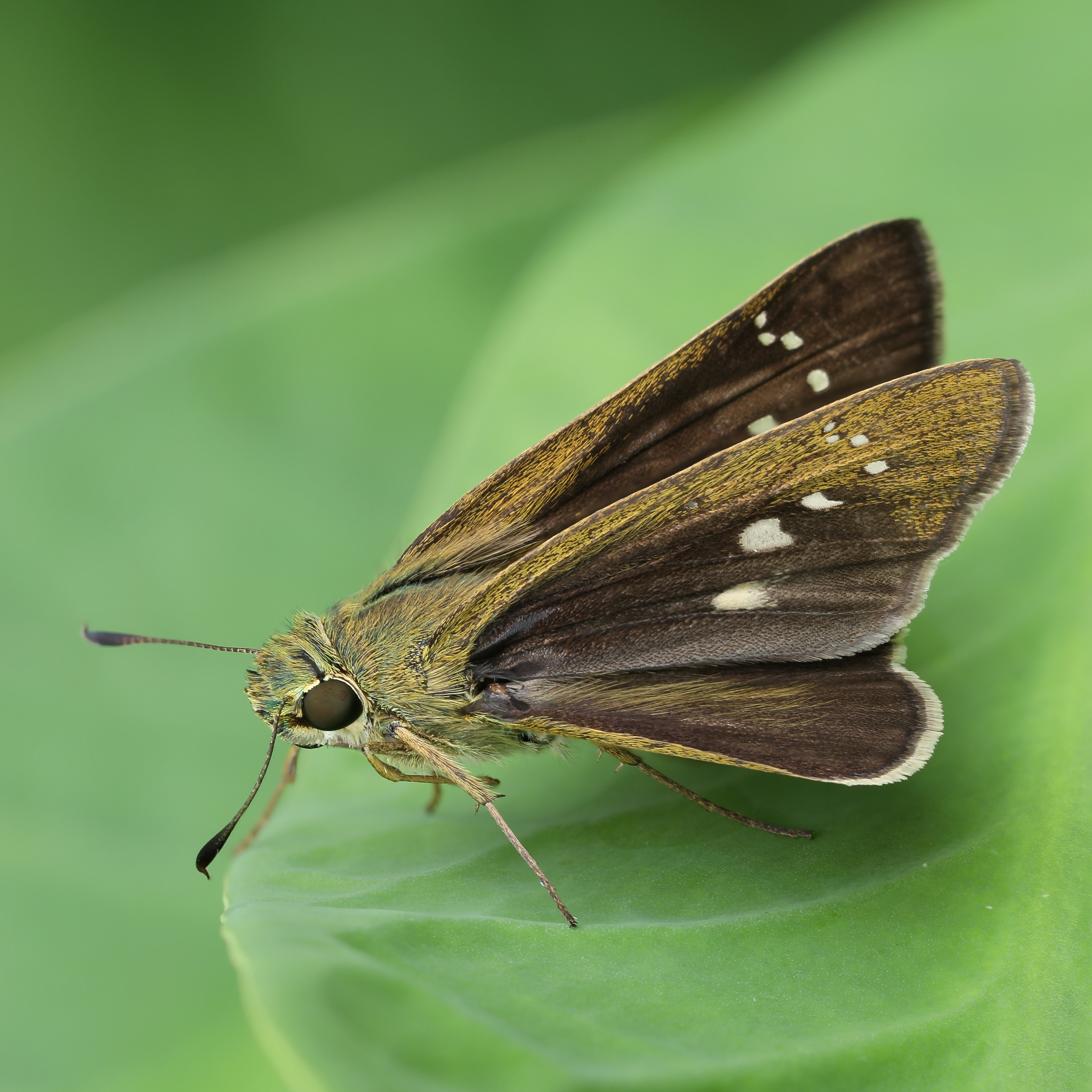
- Borbo cinnara

Scientific classification
- Kingdom: Animalia
- Phylum: Arthropoda
- Clade: Pancrustacea
- Class: Insecta
- Order: Lepidoptera
- Family: Hesperiidae
- Tribe: Baorini
- Genus: Borbo; Evans, 1949

Species
- See text

= Borbo =

Genus of butterflies

Borbo is a genus of skipper butterflies (family Hesperiidae). They belong to the tribe Baorini, and as such are among those skippers commonly known as swifts.

== Species ==
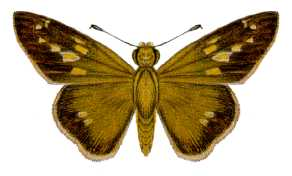
Borbo impar

Species (and some subspecies) include:

- Borbo binga (Evans, 1937)
- Borbo borbonica Boisduval, 1833
- Borbo chagwa (Evans, 1937)
- Borbo cinnara (Wallace, 1866) – rice swift, Formosan swift
- Borbo detecta (Trimen, 1893)
- Borbo fallax (Gaede, 1916)
- Borbo fanta (Evans, 1937)
- Borbo fatuellus (Hopffer, 1855)
- Borbo ferruginea (Aurivillius, 1925)
- Borbo gemella (Mabille, 1884)
- Borbo havei (Boisduval, 1833)
- Borbo holtzii (Plötz, 1883)
- Borbo impar (Mabille, 1883)
  - Borbo impar impar
  - Borbo impar lavinia (Waterhouse, 1932)
  - Borbo impar tetragaphus (Mabille, 1891)
- Borbo kaka (Evans, 1938)
- Borbo liana (Evans, 1937)
- Borbo lugens (Hopffer, 1855)
- Borbo micans (Holland, 1896)
- Borbo perobscura (Druce, 1912)
- Borbo ratek (Boisduval, 1833)
- Borbo sirena (Evans, 1937)

== Species of unknown status ==
- Borbo philippina
- Borbo toshieae Maruyama, 1991
