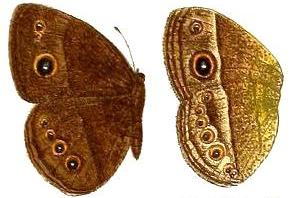
- Upper and underside of H. perspicua in Seitz's Fauna Africana

Scientific classification
- Kingdom: Animalia
- Phylum: Arthropoda
- Clade: Pancrustacea
- Class: Insecta
- Order: Lepidoptera
- Family: Nymphalidae
- Genus: Heteropsis
- Species: H. perspicua

Binomial name
- Heteropsis perspicua (Trimen, 1873)

Synonyms
- Mycalesis perspicua Trimen, 1873; Henotesia perspicua; Mycalesis maevius Staudinger, 1888; Henotesia perspicua ab. submaevius Strand, 1910; Henotesia perspicua ab. amanica Strand, 1910

= Heteropsis perspicua =

Marsh patroller

Species of butterfly

Heteropsis perspicua, the eyed bush brown, swamp patroller or marsh patroller, is a butterfly of the family Nymphalidae. It is native to eastern and southern Africa, but a western subspecies is present in Cameroon.

== Range ==
It is found in KwaZulu-Natal, Eswatini, Transvaal, Mozambique, from Zimbabwe to Kenya, in eastern Zaire and Tanzania.

== Description ==
The wingspan is 38–43 mm for males and 42–48 mm for females. Adults are on wing year-round. The wet-season form is on wing in spring and summer and the dry-season form in autumn and winter.

== Food plants ==
The larvae feed on various Poaceae species, including Ehrharta erecta, Panicum maximum and Pennisetum clandestinum.

== Subspecies ==
- Heteropsis perspicua perspicua (Ethiopia, Sudan, Uganda, Kenya, DRC, Rwanda, Burundi, Tanzania, Zambia, Malawi, Mozambique, Zimbabwe, northern Namibia, South Africa, Eswatini)
- Heteropsis perspicua camerounica (Kielland, 1994) (northern Cameroon)
