= Borbo binga =

Scientific classification
- Kingdom: Animalia
- Phylum: Arthropoda
- Class: Insecta
- Order: Lepidoptera
- Family: Hesperiidae
- Genus: Borbo
- Species: B. binga

Binomial name
- Borbo binga (Evans, 1937)

Synonyms
- Baoris binga Evans, 1937

Species of butterfly

Borbo binga, the dark forest swift, is a butterfly in the family Hesperiidae. It is found in The Ivory Coast, Ghana, Nigeria, the Republic of the Congo and the Democratic Republic of the Congo. Its habitat consists of forests.
