= Borbo sirena =

Scientific classification
- Kingdom: Animalia
- Phylum: Arthropoda
- Class: Insecta
- Order: Lepidoptera
- Family: Hesperiidae
- Genus: Borbo
- Species: B. sirena

Binomial name
- Borbo sirena (Evans, 1937)

Synonyms
- Pelopidas sirena Evans, 1937

Species of butterfly

Borbo sirena is a butterfly in the family Hesperiidae. It is found in the Democratic Republic of the Congo, Uganda, western Kenya, south-western Tanzania and northern Zambia.
