= Borbo kaka =

Scientific classification
- Kingdom: Animalia
- Phylum: Arthropoda
- Class: Insecta
- Order: Lepidoptera
- Family: Hesperiidae
- Genus: Borbo
- Species: B. kaka

Binomial name
- Borbo kaka (Evans, 1938)

Synonyms
- Baoris kaka Evans, 1938

Species of butterfly

Borbo kaka is a butterfly in the family Hesperiidae. It is found in Uganda and western Kenya.
