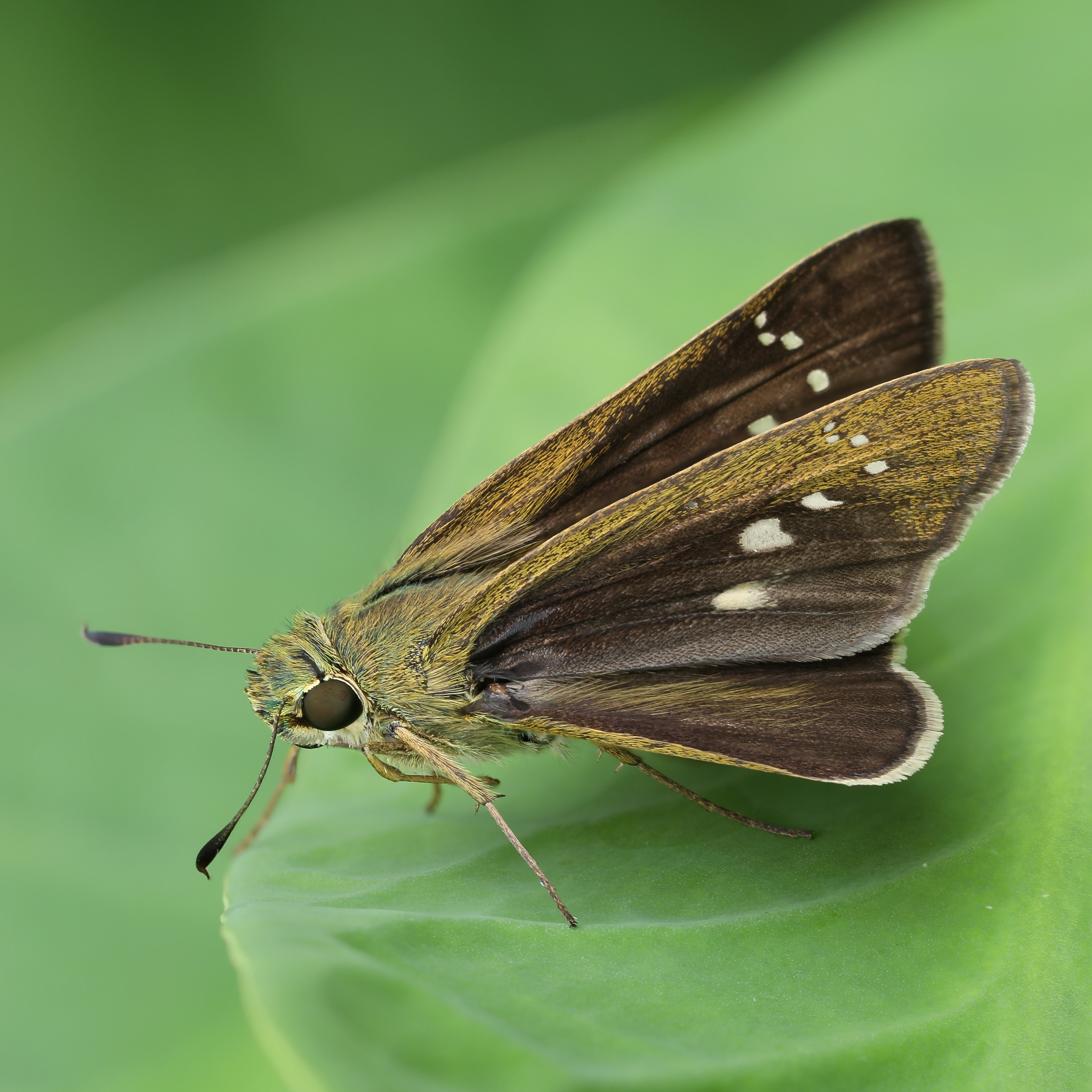

Scientific classification
- Kingdom: Animalia
- Phylum: Arthropoda
- Class: Insecta
- Order: Lepidoptera
- Family: Hesperiidae
- Genus: Borbo
- Species: B. cinnara

Binomial name
- Borbo cinnara (Wallace, 1866)

Synonyms
- Hesperia cinnara Wallace, 1866; Hesperia colaca Moore, 1877; Parnara cingala Moore, [1881]; Hesperia saturata Wood-Mason & de Nicéville, 1882; Hesperia saruna Plötz, 1885; Hesperia urejus Plötz, 1885; Parnara kuyaniana Matsumura, 1919

= Borbo cinnara =

Rice swift

Species of butterfly

Borbo cinnara, commonly known as the rice swift, Formosan swift or rice leaf folder, is a butterfly belonging to the family Hesperiidae. It is found in Sri Lanka, India, Myanmar, Vietnam, Cambodia, Taiwan, and Australia.

== Description ==
Above thorax and bases with inconspicuous greenish clothing. Usually upperside forewing with a conspicuous non-hyaline spot in space 1b, discal series in spaces 2, 3, 4 and apical dots in spaces 6, 7, 8, as well as an upper cell spot. Upperside hindwing with I or 2 dots. Underside hindwing with olive-ochreous scaling and spots in spaces 2, 3, 6. F 15-16 mm.

— William Harry Evans, A Catalogue of the Hesperiidae from Europe, Asia, and Australia in the British Museum

Larvae are known to feed on Setaria barbata, Axonopus compressus, Rottboellia cochinchinensis and Brachiaria mutica.

== Life history ==
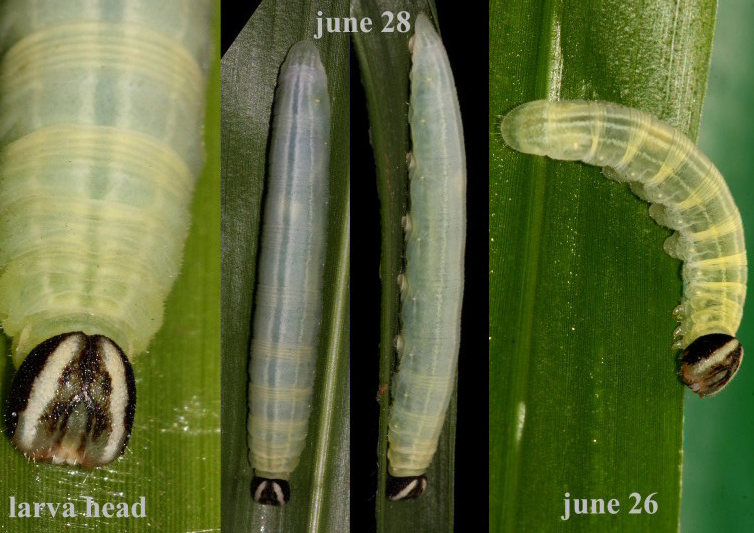
Larva

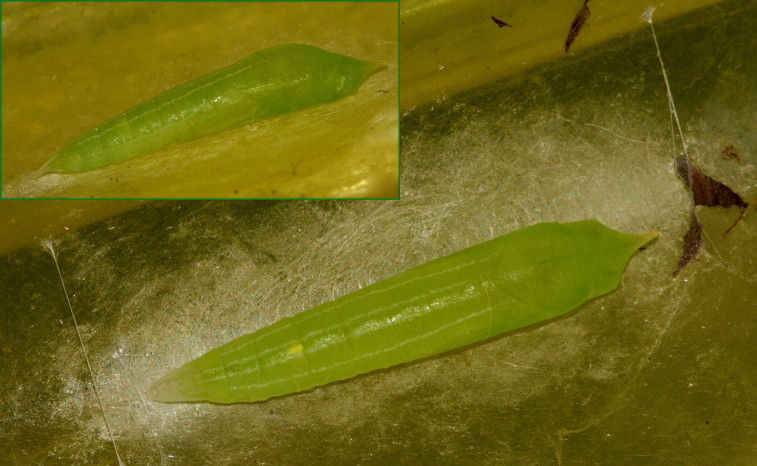
Pupa

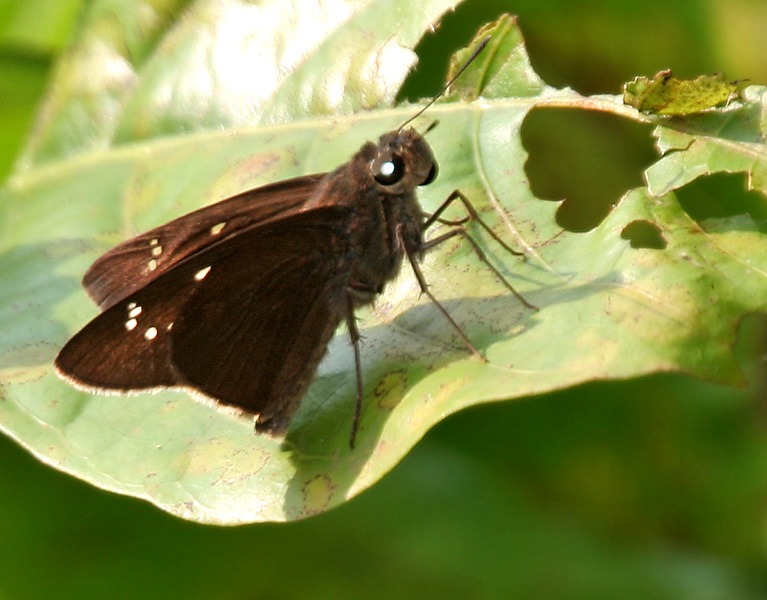
Imago

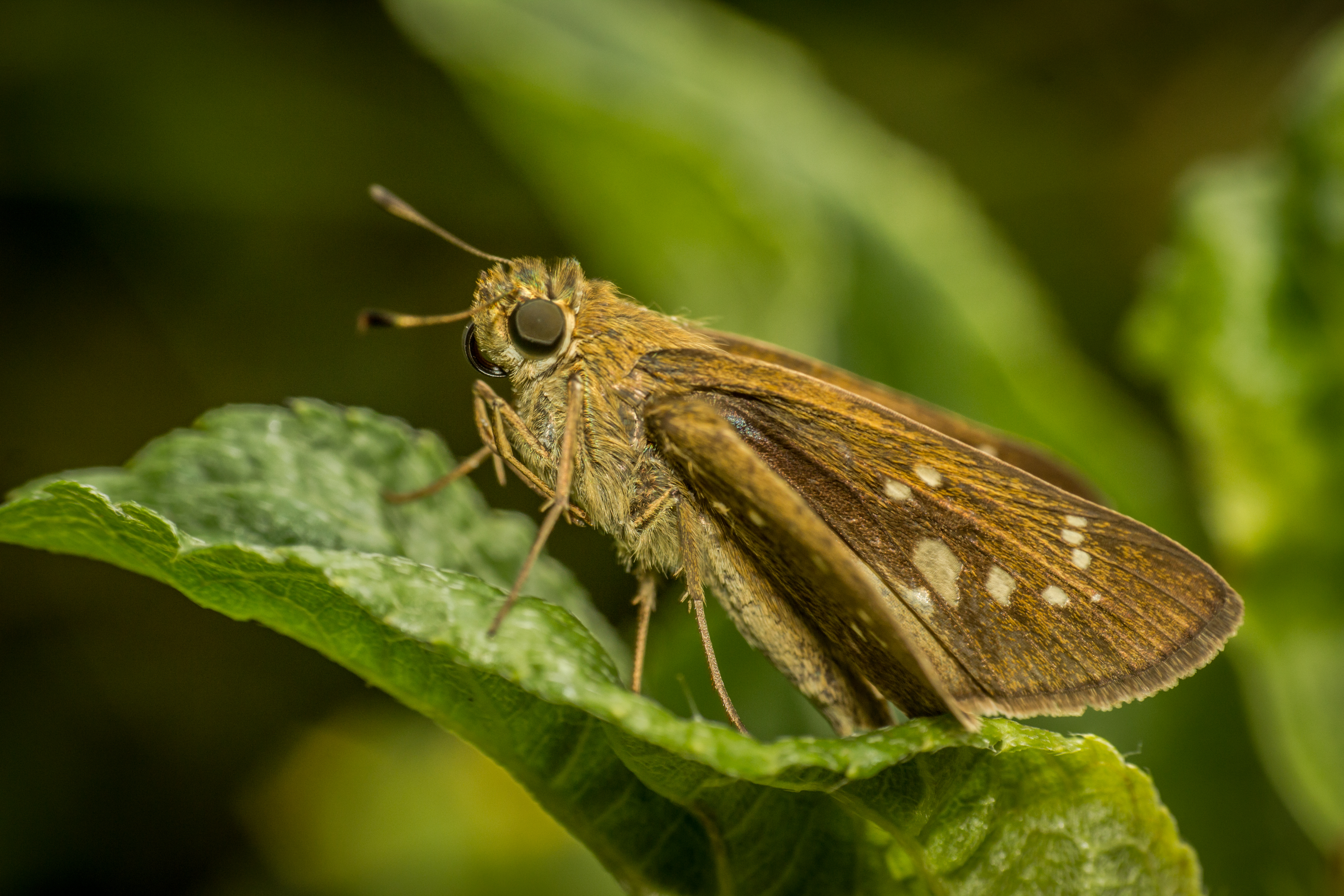
Imago

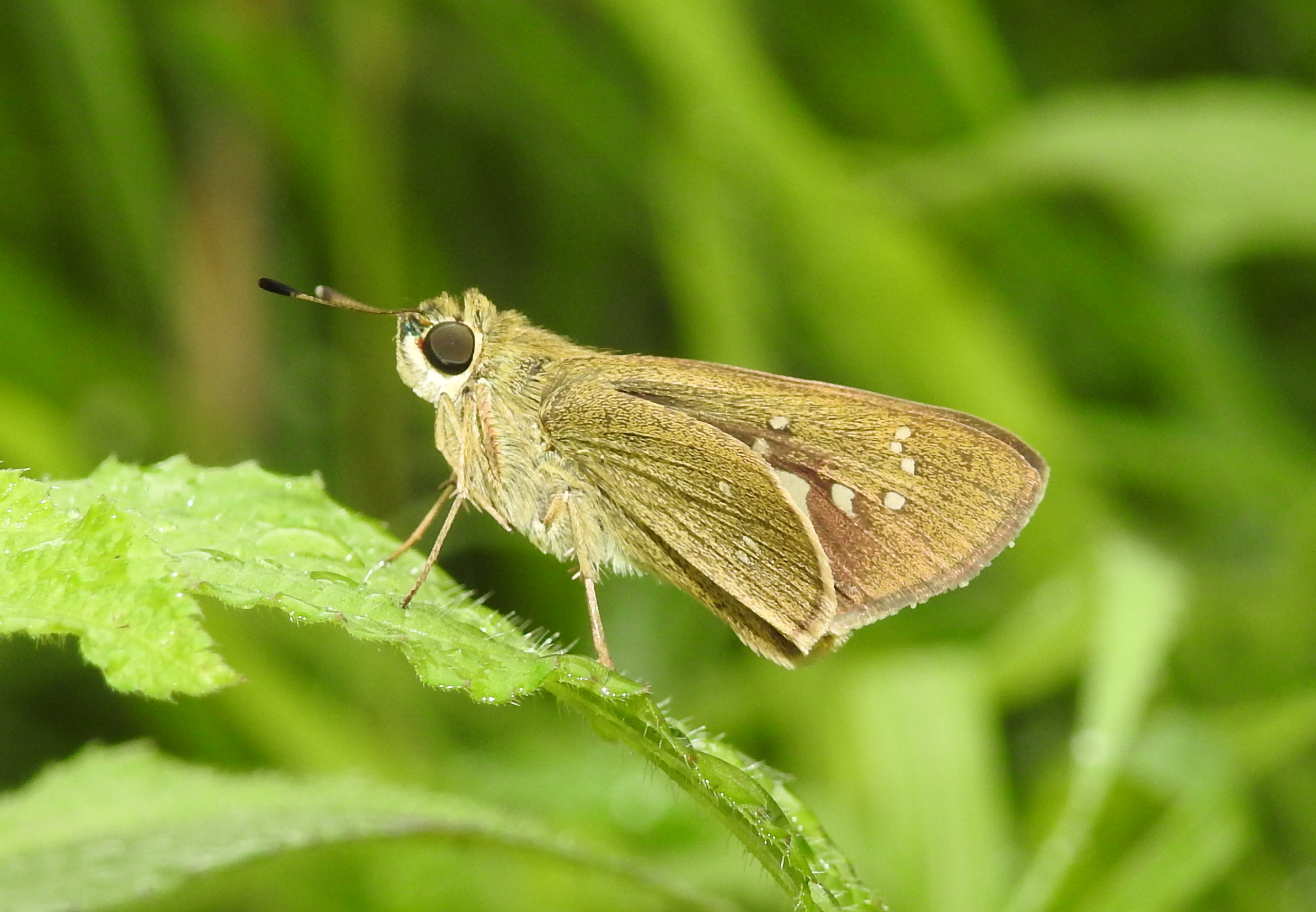
Borbo cinnara
