= Borbo liana =

Evans' scarce swift

Scientific classification
- Kingdom: Animalia
- Phylum: Arthropoda
- Class: Insecta
- Order: Lepidoptera
- Family: Hesperiidae
- Genus: Borbo
- Species: B. liana

Binomial name
- Borbo liana (Evans, 1937)

Synonyms
- Pelopidas liana Evans, 1937

Species of butterfly

Borbo liana, the Evans' scarce swift, is a butterfly in the family Hesperiidae. It is found in Sierra Leone.
