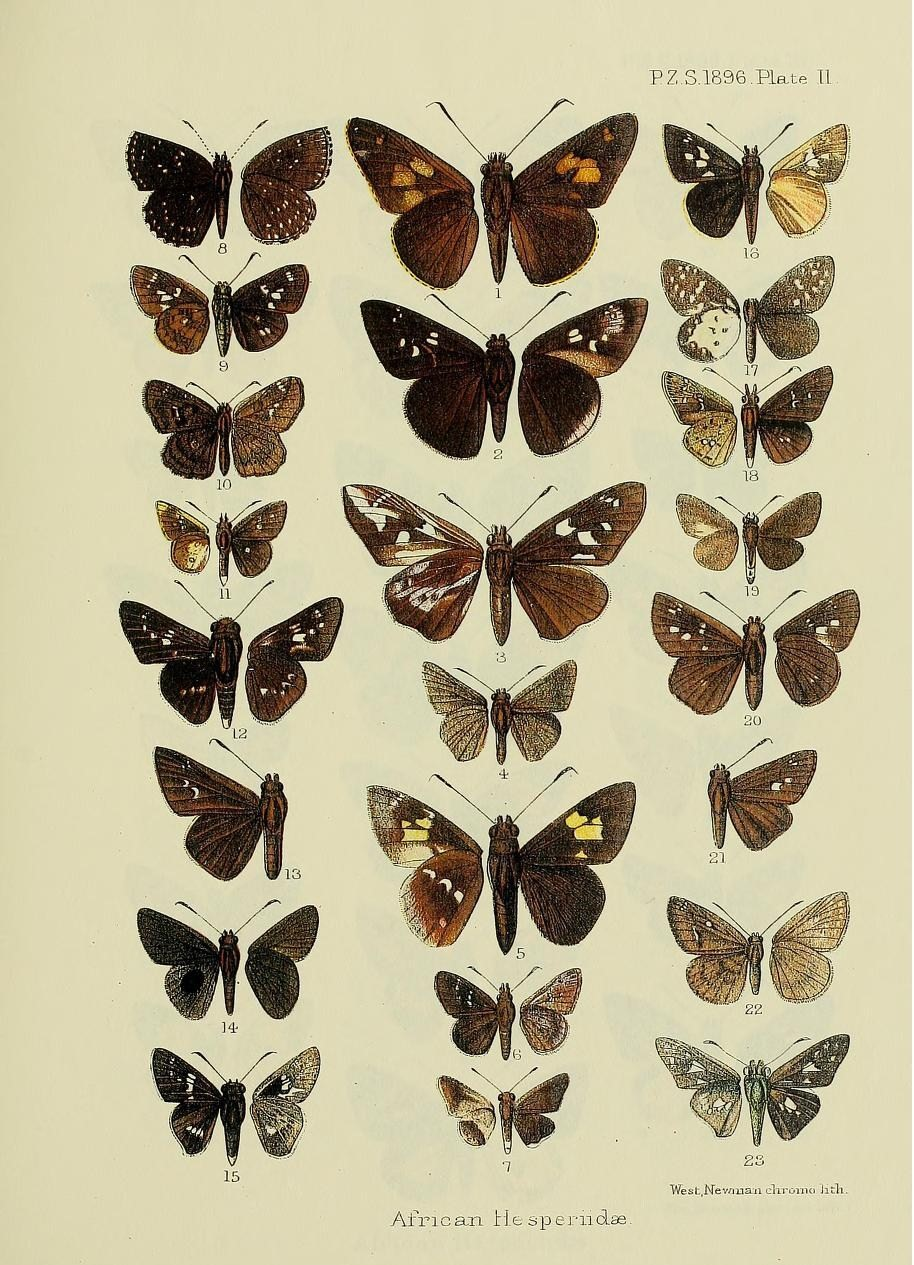
- Borbo lugens figure 13

Scientific classification
- Kingdom: Animalia
- Phylum: Arthropoda
- Class: Insecta
- Order: Lepidoptera
- Family: Hesperiidae
- Genus: Borbo
- Species: B. lugens

Binomial name
- Borbo lugens (Hopffer, 1855)

Synonyms
- Pamphila lugens Hopffer, 1855; Pamphila xylos Mabille, 1890; Baoris maranga Butler, 1900; Suastus plana Swinhoe, 1915

= Borbo lugens =

Species of butterfly

Borbo lugens, the lesser horned swift or lesser horned skipper, is a butterfly of the family Hesperiidae. It is found in eastern Africa and South Africa. The habitat consists of grassy clearings in dense woodland and forests.

The wingspan is 30–35 mm for males and 36–38 mm for females. Adults are on wing year-round, but are more common from October to May in southern Africa.

The larvae feed on Ehrharta erecta, Setaria sulcata, Setaria megaphylla, Panicum (including Panicum deustrum), Stipa and Pennisetum species.
