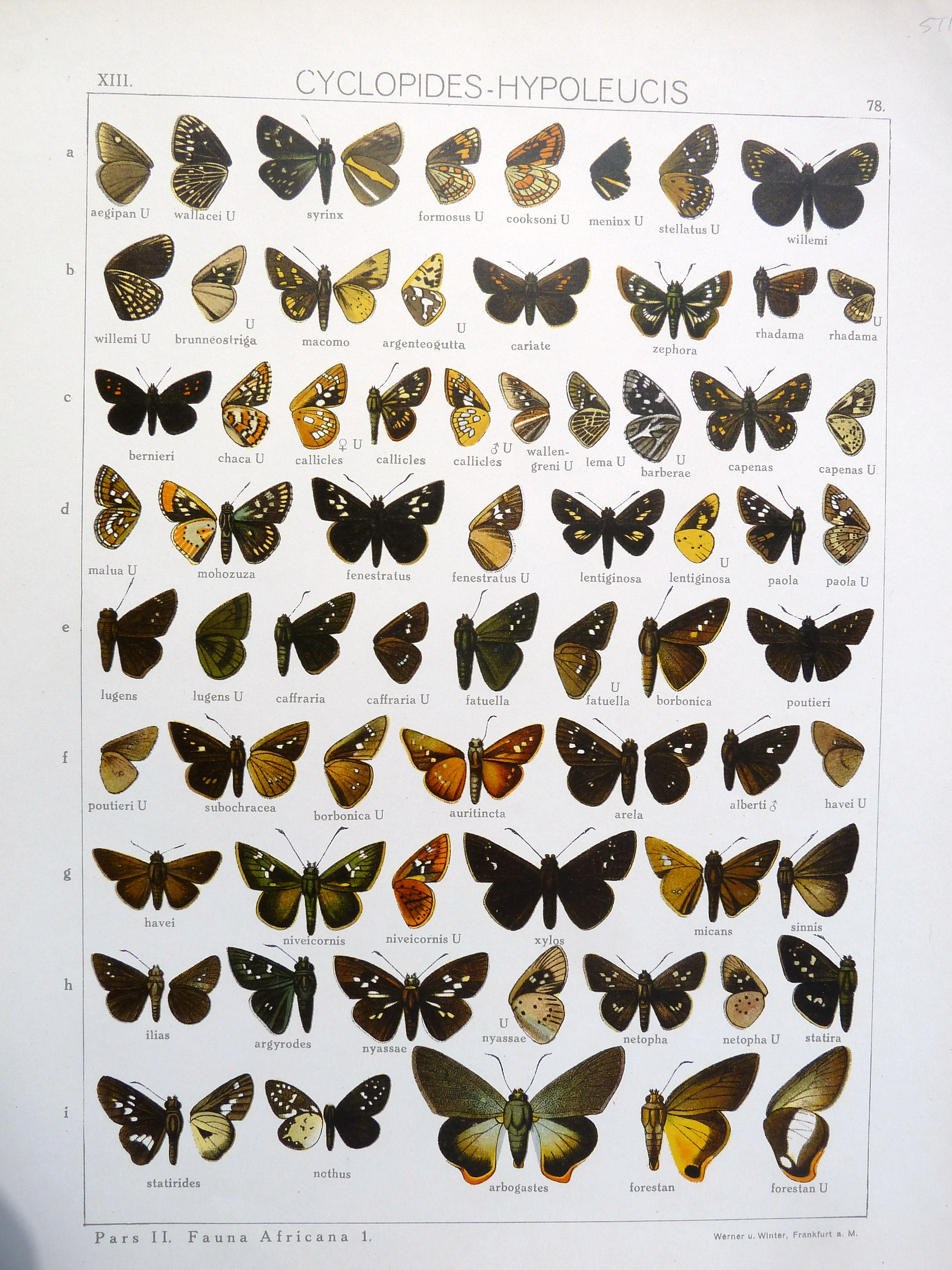
- in Seitz f

Scientific classification
- Kingdom: Animalia
- Phylum: Arthropoda
- Class: Insecta
- Order: Lepidoptera
- Family: Hesperiidae
- Genus: Borbo
- Species: B. detecta

Binomial name
- Borbo detecta (Trimen, 1893)

Synonyms
- Pamphila detecta Trimen, 1893; Pamphila fallatus Mabille; Holland, 1896; Pamphila pyrrhobaphes Mabille, 1898; Baoris auritinctus Butler, 1898

= Borbo detecta =

Rusty swift

Species of African butterfly

Borbo detecta, the rusty swift, is a butterfly of the family Hesperiidae. It is found from South Africa to eastern Africa and Zaire. In South Africa it is found in Eswatini and lowland riverine forests and savannah in KwaZulu-Natal to south-eastern Mpumalanga. The habitat consists of moist woodland.

The wingspan is 34–36 mm for males and 36–38 mm for females. Adults are on wing year-round, but are scarcer in winter in southern Africa.

The larvae feed on various Poaceae species, including Ehrharta erecta.
