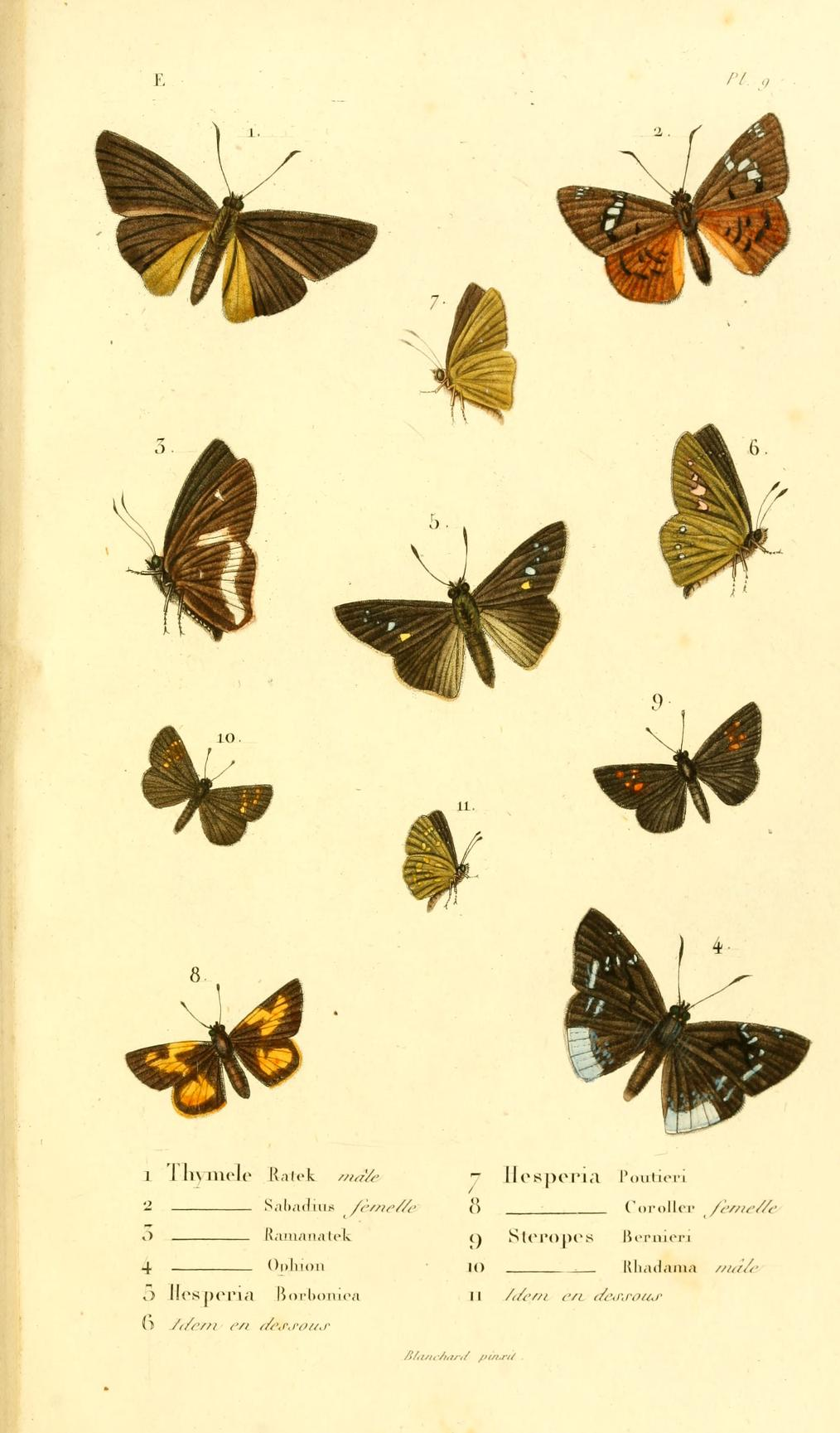

Scientific classification
- Kingdom: Animalia
- Phylum: Arthropoda
- Class: Insecta
- Order: Lepidoptera
- Family: Hesperiidae
- Genus: Borbo
- Species: B. ratek

Binomial name
- Borbo ratek (Boisduval, 1833)

Synonyms
- Thymele ratek Boisduval, 1833; Pamphila sinnis Mabille, 1878; Hesperia weymeri Saalmüller, 1884

= Borbo ratek =

Species of butterfly

Borbo ratek is a butterfly in the family Hesperiidae. It is found in the forested regions of northern and eastern Madagascar.
