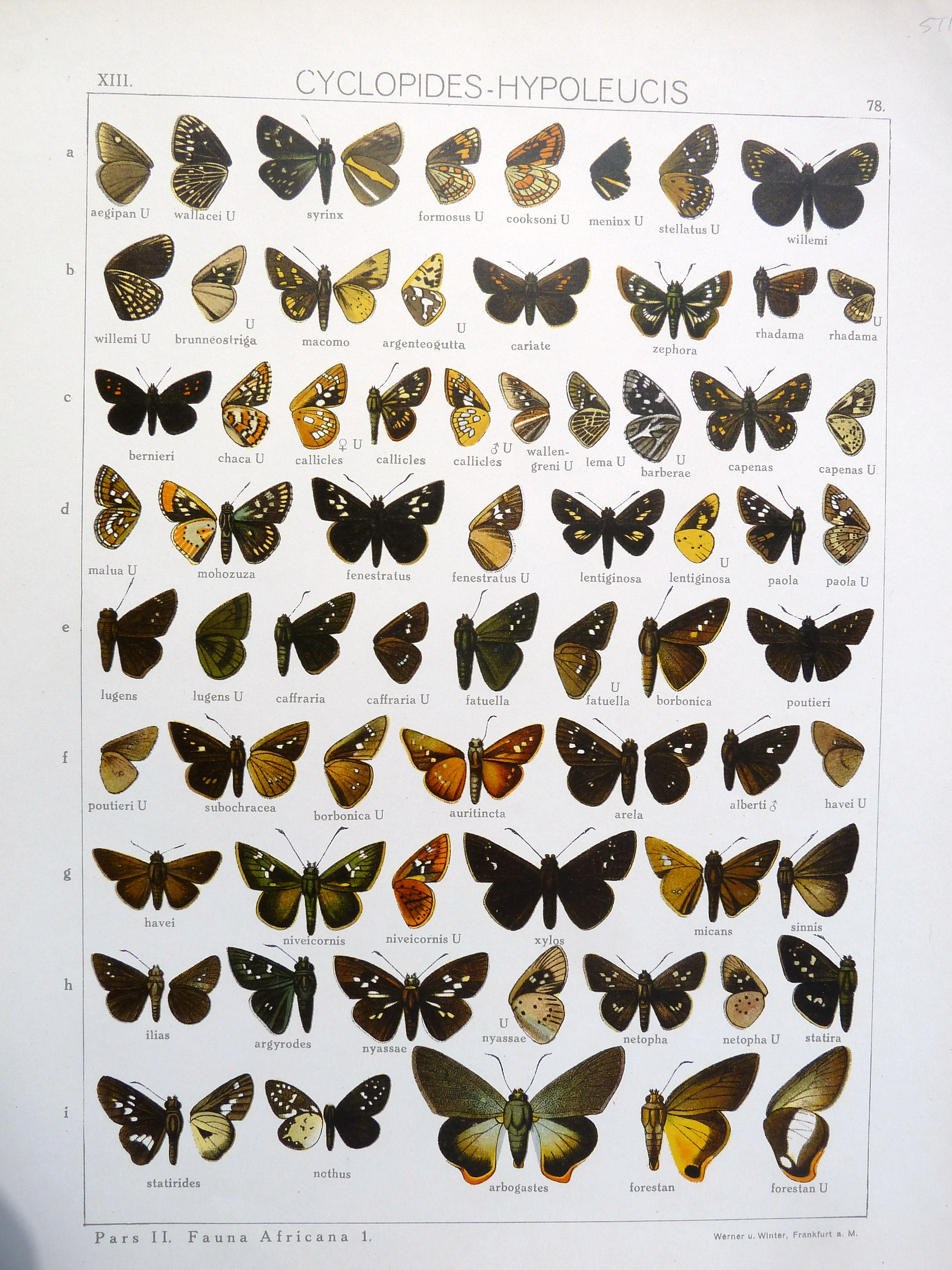
- in Seitz f

Scientific classification
- Kingdom: Animalia
- Phylum: Arthropoda
- Class: Insecta
- Order: Lepidoptera
- Family: Hesperiidae
- Genus: Borbo
- Species: B. havei

Binomial name
- Borbo havei (Boisduval, 1833)

Synonyms
- Hesperia havei Boisduval, 1833

= Borbo havei =

Species of butterfly

Borbo havei is a butterfly in the family Hesperiidae. It is found on Madagascar. The habitat consists of transformed forest margins, grassland and anthropogenic environments.
