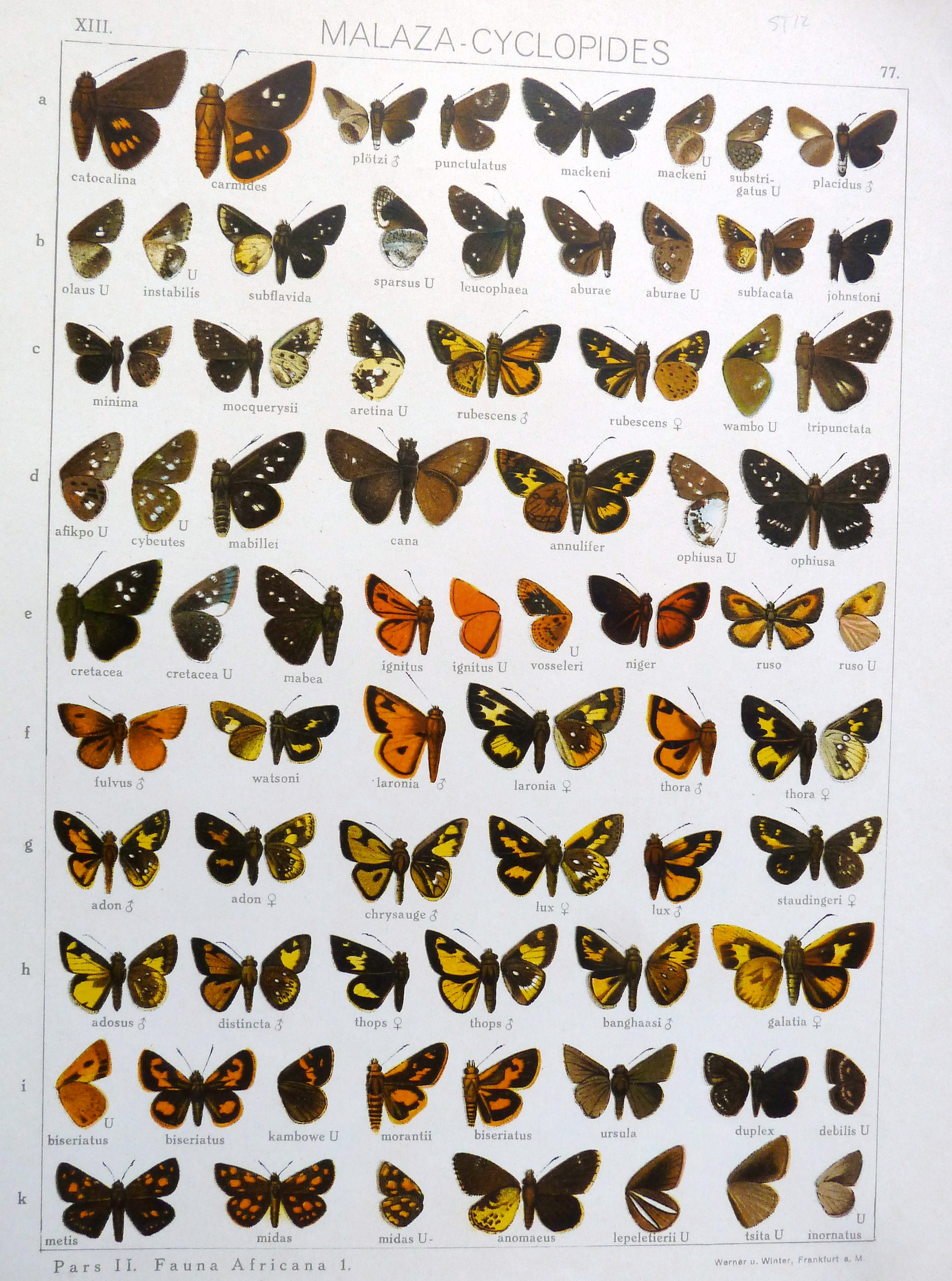
- as cana Lathy

Scientific classification
- Kingdom: Animalia
- Phylum: Arthropoda
- Class: Insecta
- Order: Lepidoptera
- Family: Hesperiidae
- Genus: Borbo
- Species: B. holtzii

Binomial name
- Borbo holtzii (Plötz, 1883)

Synonyms
- Hesperia holtzii Plötz, 1883; Pamphila aures Mabille, 1883; Baoris cana Lathy, 1901; Baoris caesia Gaede, 1917; Baoris aequalis Gaede, 1917; Pelopidas rougeoti Picard, 1949

= Borbo holtzii =

Species of butterfly

Borbo holtzii, the variable swift, is a butterfly of the family Hesperiidae. It is found in Africa, including south-eastern Senegal, Guinea, Sierra Leone, Liberia, Ivory Coast, Ghana, Nigeria, Gabon, the Republic of the Congo, Angola, Kenya, Tanzania, Malawi, Zambia, Zimbabwe, Mozambique, South Africa (the Limpopo Province, Mpumalanga and KwaZulu-Natal) and Eswatini. The habitat consists of frost-free savanna.

Adults are on wing year round, but are most common in winter.

The larvae feed on Rottboellia megaphylla.
