= Borbo fatuellus =

- Arusha National Park, Tanzania

Scientific classification
- Kingdom: Animalia
- Phylum: Arthropoda
- Clade: Pancrustacea
- Class: Insecta
- Order: Lepidoptera
- Family: Hesperiidae
- Genus: Borbo
- Species: B. fatuellus

Binomial name
- Borbo fatuellus (Hopffer, 1855)

Synonyms
- Pamphila fatuellus Hopffer, 1855; Pamphila cinerea Holland, 1892; Hesperia caffraria Plötz, 1883; Pamphila dolens Mabille, 1898; Baoris fatuellus thomea Evans, 1937

Species of butterfly

Borbo fatuellus, the long horned swift, long horned skipper or foolish swift, is a butterfly of the family Hesperiidae. It is found in tropical Africa and south-western Arabia. The habitat consists of wet forests, moist woodland and coastal bush.

The wingspan is 33–42 mm for males and 40–43 mm for females. Adults are on wing year-round, but are more common from October to May in southern Africa.

The larvae feed on Ehrharta erecta, Setaria sulcata, Setaria megaphylla, Imperata cylindrica, Pennisetum, Panicum and Digitaria species.

== Subspecies ==
- Borbo fatuellus fatuellus (Sub-Saharan Africa, including Senegal, Gambia, Burkina Faso, Guinea-Bissau, Guinea, Sierra Leone, Liberia, Ivory Coast, Ghana, Togo, Nigeria, Cameroon, Bioko, Zambia, Mozambique, Zimbabwe, northern Botswana, northern Namibia, Yemen, South Africa: coastal lowland forests and wooded Savannah from the Eastern Cape to Eswatini and along the coast to northern KwaZulu-Natal, Mpumalanga and the Limpopo Province and the further north)
- Borbo fatuellus dolens (Mabille, 1898) (Comoro Islands)
- Borbo fatuellus thomea (Evans, 1937) (São Tomé and Príncipe)

Torben Larsen developed a species numbering system for his 2005 publication Butterflies of West Africa. The nominate subspecies is #1453. The 'Larsen' numbers have since been used with permission in A Sharp Eye on Butterflies of Ghana.
