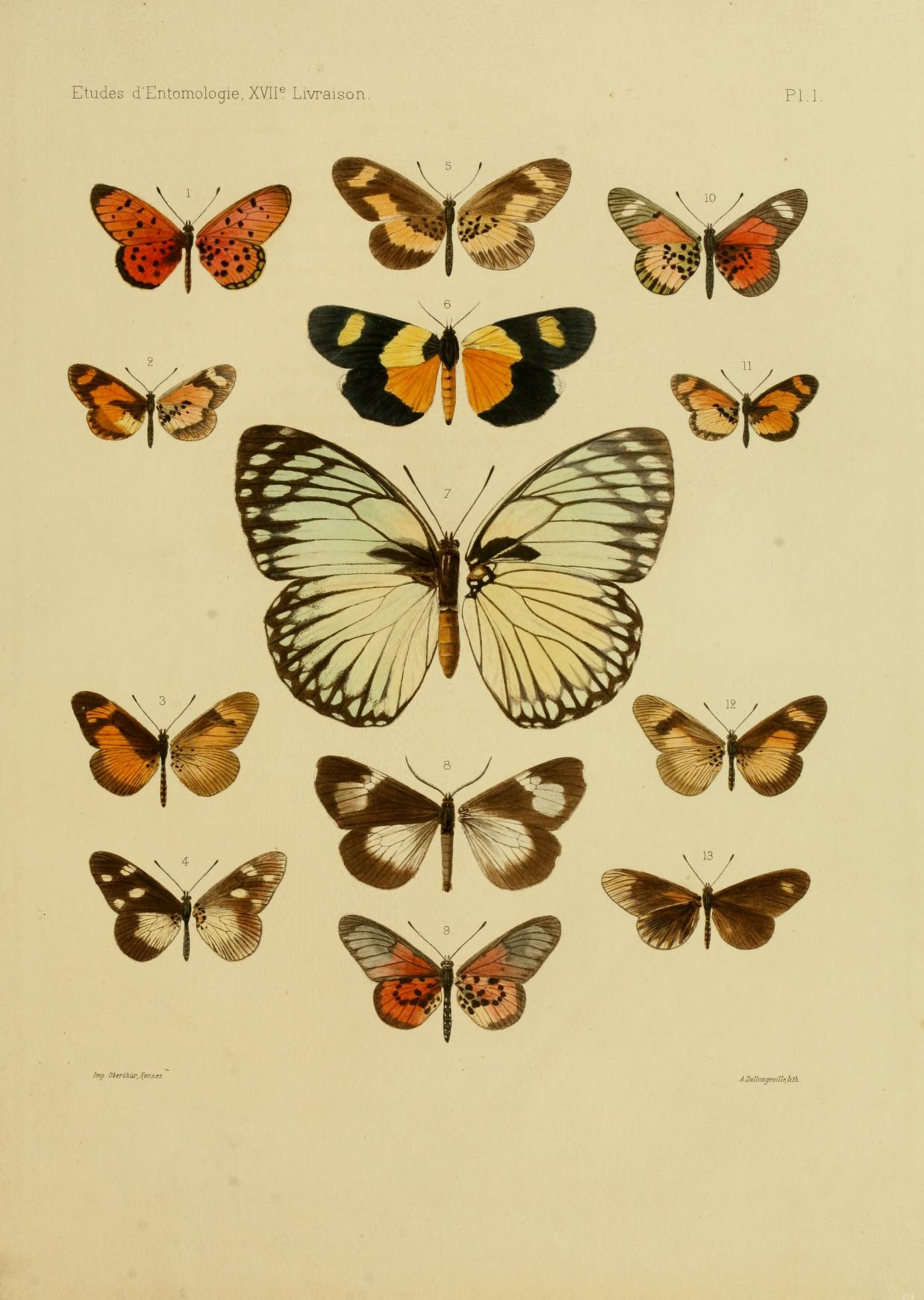
- Figure 10

Scientific classification
- Kingdom: Animalia
- Phylum: Arthropoda
- Class: Insecta
- Order: Lepidoptera
- Family: Nymphalidae
- Genus: Acraea
- Species: A. conradti

Binomial name
- Acraea conradti Oberthür, 1893

Synonyms
- Acraea (Actinote) conradti; Acraea conradti ab. flavescens Blachier, 1912; Acraea conradti f. maculosa Le Doux, 1928; Acraea conradti f. usambarensis Le Doux, 1928; Acraea conradti f. vossleri Le Doux, 1928

= Acraea conradti =

Species of butterfly

Acraea conradti is a butterfly in the family Nymphalidae. It is found in Tanzania (from the north-east to the Usambara Mountains) and Mozambique.

== Description ==
A. conradti Oberth. (56 f) differs from all the preceding similarly coloured and marked species [members of the Acraea masamba species group.] in having the apical half of the forewing densely scaled without vitreous spot in 3 but with sharply defined white spots in 4 to 6 and especially in having the veins of the hindwing beneath broadly black at the distal margin and the streaks short and thickened, coniform. Nyassaland and German East Africa.

== Taxonomy ==
It is a member of the Acraea circeis species group- but see also Pierre & Bernaud, 2014
