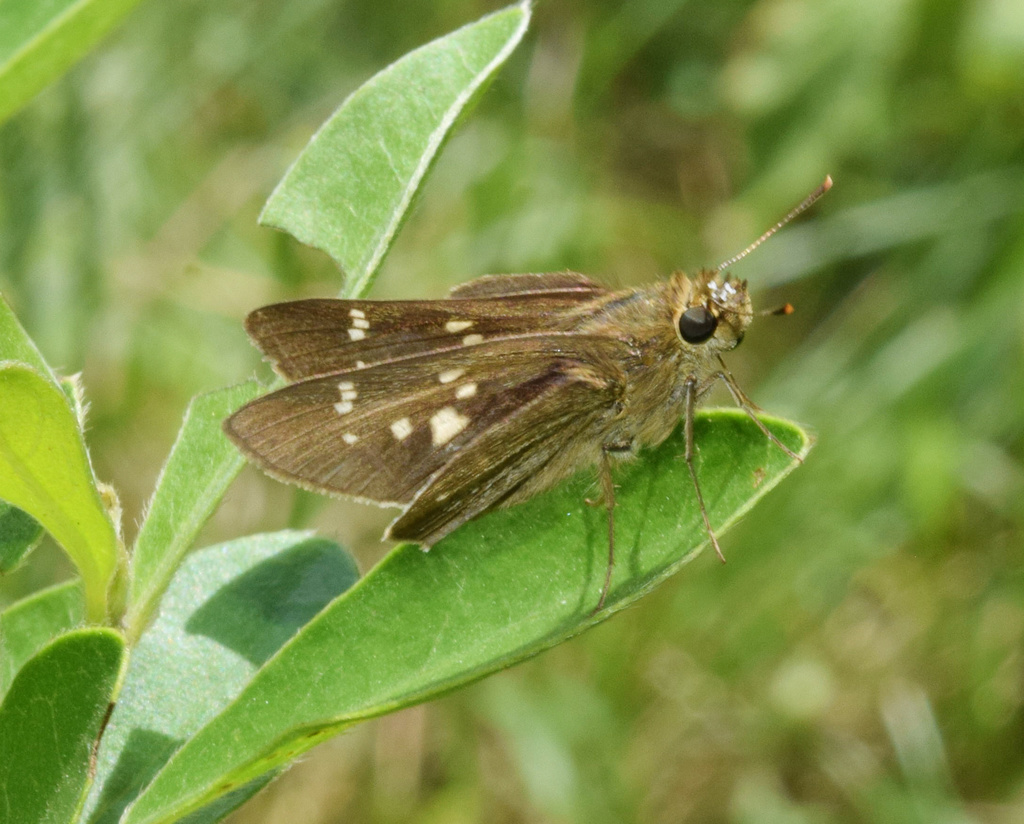

Scientific classification
- Kingdom: Animalia
- Phylum: Arthropoda
- Class: Insecta
- Order: Lepidoptera
- Family: Hesperiidae
- Genus: Borbo
- Species: B. fallax

Binomial name
- Borbo fallax (Gaede, 1916)

Synonyms
- Parnara fallax Gaede, 1916

= Borbo fallax =

Species of butterfly

Borbo fallax, the false swift, is a butterfly of the family Hesperiidae. It is found in tropical Africa. In South Africa it is found in Eswatini, coastal KwaZulu-Natal, northern Gauteng and the Limpopo Province and the extreme north-east of the North West Province. The habitat consists of coastal bush and moist savanna.

The wingspan is 36–43 mm for males and 41–44 mm for females. Adults are on wing year-round, but are scarcer in winter in southern Africa.

The larvae feed on various Poaceae species, including Ehrharta erecta and Saccharum species.
