= Borbo perobscura =

Small swift

Scientific classification
- Kingdom: Animalia
- Phylum: Arthropoda
- Clade: Pancrustacea
- Class: Insecta
- Order: Lepidoptera
- Family: Hesperiidae
- Genus: Borbo
- Species: B. perobscura

Binomial name
- Borbo perobscura (H. Druce, 1912)

Synonyms
- Parnara perobscura H. Druce, 1912; Parnara gemina Gaede, 1916; Parnara trigemina Gaede, 1916; Parnara detecta f. karschi Aurivillius, 1925; Borbo falarus Mabille; Aurivillius, 1925

Species of butterfly

Borbo perobscura, the small swift, is a butterfly in the family Hesperiidae. The species was first described by Herbert Druce in 1912. It is found in Senegal, the Gambia, Burkina Faso, Guinea, Sierra Leone, Liberia, Ivory Coast, Ghana, Togo, Nigeria, Cameroon, São Tomé, the Republic of the Congo, the Central African Republic, the Democratic Republic of the Congo (Shaba), southern Sudan, Uganda, Ethiopia, south-western Kenya, Tanzania, Malawi and northern Zambia. The habitat consists of savanna and degraded forests.

Adults are attracted to flowers.
