= Borbo chagwa =

Scientific classification
- Kingdom: Animalia
- Phylum: Arthropoda
- Class: Insecta
- Order: Lepidoptera
- Family: Hesperiidae
- Genus: Borbo
- Species: B. chagwa

Binomial name
- Borbo chagwa (Evans, 1937)

Synonyms
- Pelopidas chagwa Evans, 1937; Pelopidas kilwa Evans, 1937; Parnara guttana Evans, 1947

Species of butterfly

Borbo chagwa, the Chagwa swift or Chagwa skipper, is a butterfly in the family Hesperiidae. It is found in Uganda, Tanzania, Mozambique and eastern Zimbabwe. The habitat consists of forests.

Adults have been recorded on wing in spring and autumn.
