= Borbo ferruginea =

Scientific classification
- Kingdom: Animalia
- Phylum: Arthropoda
- Class: Insecta
- Order: Lepidoptera
- Family: Hesperiidae
- Genus: Borbo
- Species: B. ferruginea

Binomial name
- Borbo ferruginea (Aurivillius, 1925)

Synonyms
- Parnara ferruginea Aurivillius, 1925

Species of butterfly

Borbo ferruginea, the ferruginous swift, ferrous swift or ferrous skipper, is a butterfly of the family Hesperiidae. It is found in southern and south-eastern Africa, in South Africa and from Mozambique to Kenya. In South Africa it is restricted to the lowland forests of KwaZulu-Natal. The habitat consists of coastal forests.

Their wingspan is 36–39 mm for males and 42–45 mm for females. Adults are probably on wing year-round, but it is more from October to May in southern Africa.

== Subspecies ==
- Borbo ferruginea ferruginea (eastern Kenya, Tanzania)
- Borbo ferruginea dondo Evans, 1955 (KwaZulu-Natal to southern Mozambique and eastern Zimbabwe)
