= Spialia depauperata =

Scientific classification
- Domain: Eukaryota
- Kingdom: Animalia
- Phylum: Arthropoda
- Class: Insecta
- Order: Lepidoptera
- Family: Hesperiidae
- Genus: Spialia
- Species: S. depauperata

Binomial name
- Spialia depauperata (Strand, 1911)

Synonyms
- Hesperia ferax var. depauperata Strand, 1911; Syrichthus rehfousi Oberthür, 1912

Species of butterfly

Spialia depauperata, the wandering sandman or deprived grizzled skipper, is a butterfly of the family Hesperiidae. It is found from Kenya to Natal and in Uganda.

The wingspan is 23–28 mm for males and 31–33 mm for females. Adults are on wing year-round in warmer areas with peaks from September to December and from January to March in southern Africa.

The larvae feed on Melhania species.

== Subspecies ==
- Spialia depauperata depauperata (Uganda, Kenya, Tanzania, Democratic Republic of the Congo, Malawi, Zambia, Mozambique)
- Spialia depauperata australis de Jong, 1978 (Mozambique, Zimbabwe, northern and eastern Botswana, Namibia, Eswatini, South Africa: from northern KwaZulu-Natal, and Mpumalanga to the Limpopo Province)
