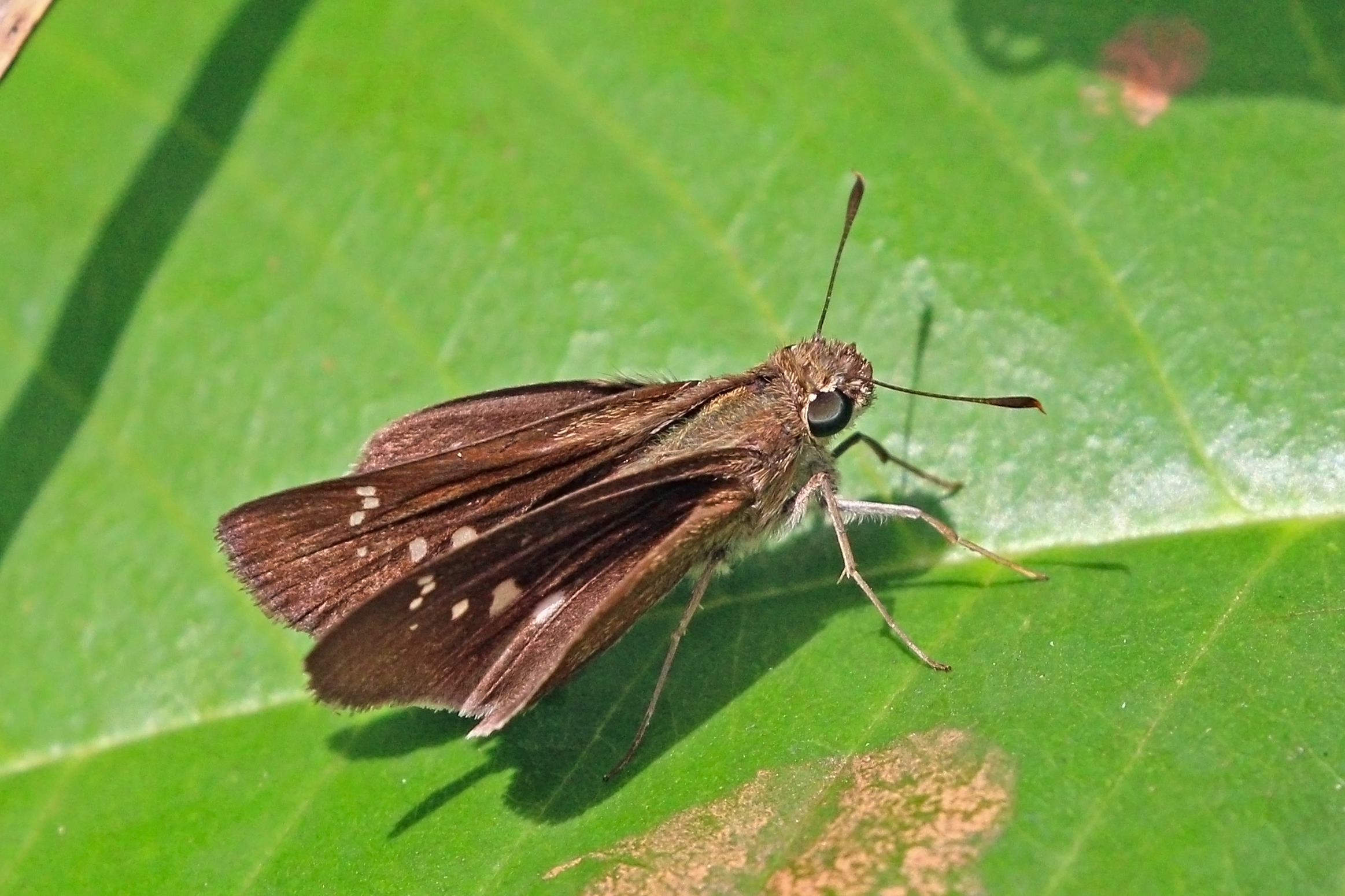
- Ghana
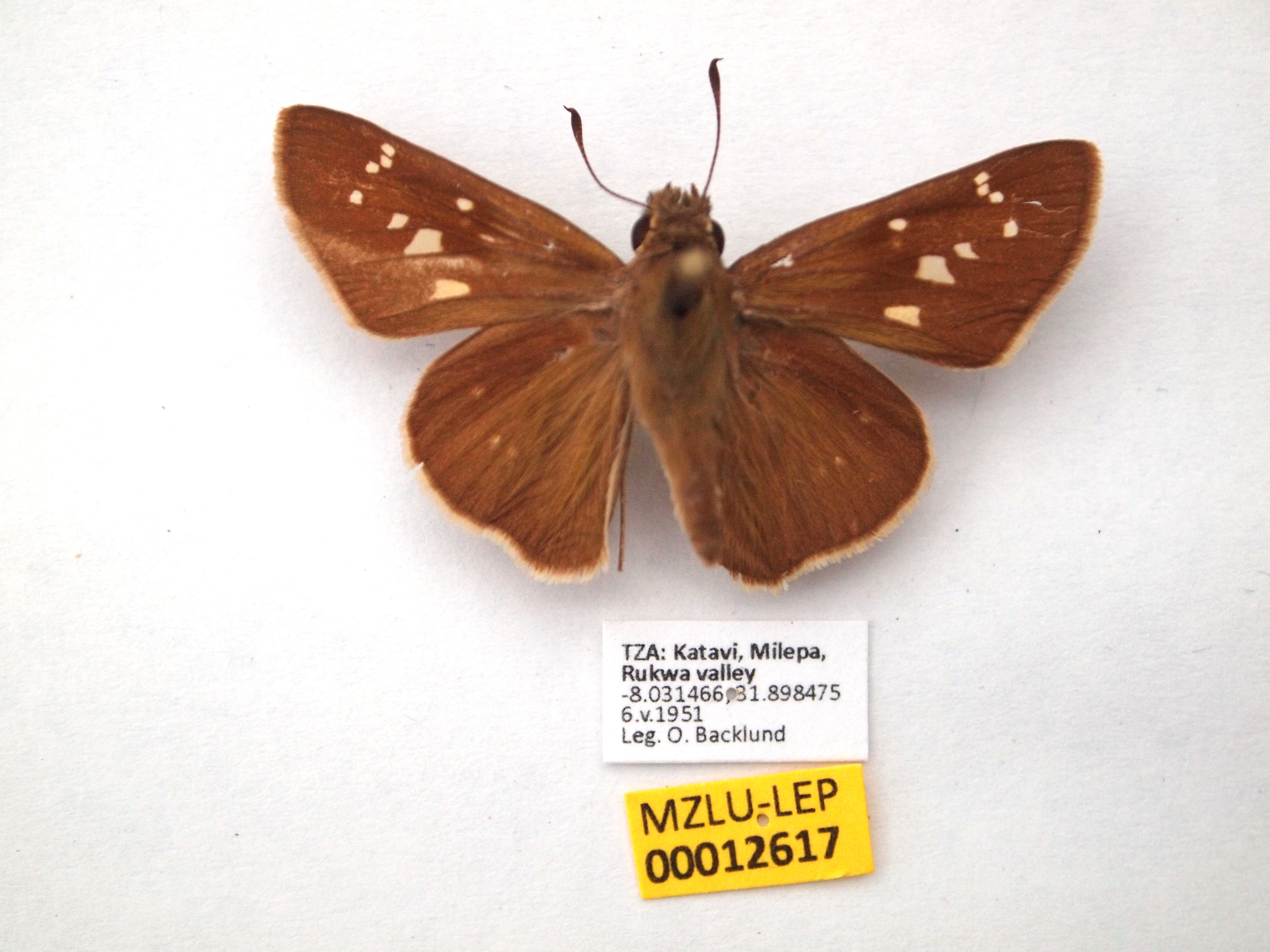

Scientific classification
- Kingdom: Animalia
- Phylum: Arthropoda
- Clade: Pancrustacea
- Class: Insecta
- Order: Lepidoptera
- Family: Hesperiidae
- Genus: Borbo
- Species: B. borbonica

Binomial name
- Borbo borbonica (Boisduval, 1833)

Synonyms
- Hesperia borbonica Boisduval, 1833; Hesperia borbonica zelleri Lederer, 1855; Pamphila borbonica-holli Oberthür, 1910; Hesperia senegalensis Klug, 1842; Hesperia zelleri Lederer, 1855; Pamphila borbonica holii Oberthür, 1910 in Oberthür, 1909-10; Parnara borbonica var. continentalis Strand, 1912; Pamphila morella de Joannis, 1893

= Borbo borbonica =

Species of butterfly

Borbo borbonica, the borbo skipper, Zeller's skipper or olive haired swift, is a butterfly of the family Hesperiidae. It is found along the southern coasts of the Mediterranean Sea including SW Spain, but mainly in Syria, Arabia, Africa, Mauritius and Réunion.

The length of the forewings is 14–15 mm.The diskal spots on the upper surface of the dull brown forewings are translucent. The spot in Cu2-A is yellowish. The underside of the forewings is brown. The hind wing underside is yellowish brown. The palpi are leather-colored. Females are similar but slightly paler. There are three small, pale but distinct postdiscal spots on their hind wing underside.[The hindwing beneath with a postmedian row of 4—5 small white spots which are placed in a diffuse blackish area ( P. zelleri Led.)] Adults are on wing from September to October.

In North Africa Leersia oryzoides and Sorghum halepense have been recorded as food plants for the larvae. In Mauritius, they feed on various grasses, such as Panicum. In South-Africa, larvae have been recorded on Ehrharta erecta, Oryza, Pennisetum and Zea mays.The habitat is dry-hot, rocky coastal canyons and sand dunes with sparse vegetation

== Subspecies ==
- Borbo borbonica borbonica (Gibraltar, North Africa, Middle East, Sub-Saharan Africa, including Mauritania, Senegal, Gambia, Burkina Faso, Guinea, Sierra Leone, Liberia, Ivory Coast, Ghana, Togo, northern Nigeria, Zambia, Mozambique, Zimbabwe, northern Botswana, northern Namibia, South Africa, Eswatini, Madagascar, Reunion, Rodrigues, Mauritius)
- Borbo borbonica morella (de Joannis, 1893) (Seychelles)
