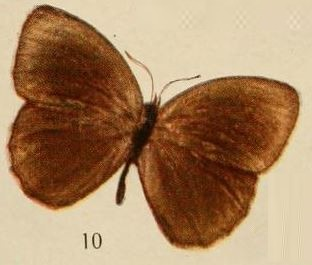

Scientific classification
- Kingdom: Animalia
- Phylum: Arthropoda
- Clade: Pancrustacea
- Class: Insecta
- Order: Lepidoptera
- Family: Nymphalidae
- Genus: Bicyclus
- Species: B. angulosa

Binomial name
- Bicyclus angulosa (Butler, 1868)

Synonyms
- Mycalesis angulosa Butler, 1868; Bicyclus angulosus; Mycalesis houyi Gaede, 1915; Mycalesis langi Holland, 1920; Mycalesis chapini Holland, 1920; Mycalesis funebris orientis Ungemach, 1932; Mycalesis selousi Trimen, 1895; Mycalesis desolata selousi f. barnsi van Son, 1955; Mycalesis selousi f. simulans Overlaet, 1955

= Bicyclus angulosa =

Startled bush brown

Species of butterfly

Bicyclus angulosa, the startled bush brown, is a butterfly in the family Nymphalidae. It is found from Senegal to Cameroon, in the Central African Republic, the Democratic Republic of the Congo, Sudan, Uganda, Ethiopia, Kenya, Angola, Tanzania, Zambia, Malawi, Mozambique and Zimbabwe. The habitat consists of dense savanna, including Brachystegia woodland.

Both sexes are attracted by fermenting fruit. Adults of the wet-season form are on wing from December to May, while adults of the dry-season form are found from May to September.

== Subspecies ==
- Bicyclus angulosa angulosa (Senegal to Cameroon, Central African Republic, northern and eastern Democratic Republic of the Congo, Sudan, Uganda, western Kenya, Ethiopia)
- Bicyclus angulosa selousi (Trimen, 1895) (Angola, southern Democratic Republic of the Congo, Tanzania, Zambia, Malawi, Mozambique, northern and north-eastern Zimbabwe)

Torben Larsen developed a species numbering system for his 2005 publication Butterflies of West Africa. The nominate subspecies is #698. The 'Larsen' numbers have since been used with permission in A Sharp Eye on Butterflies of Ghana.
