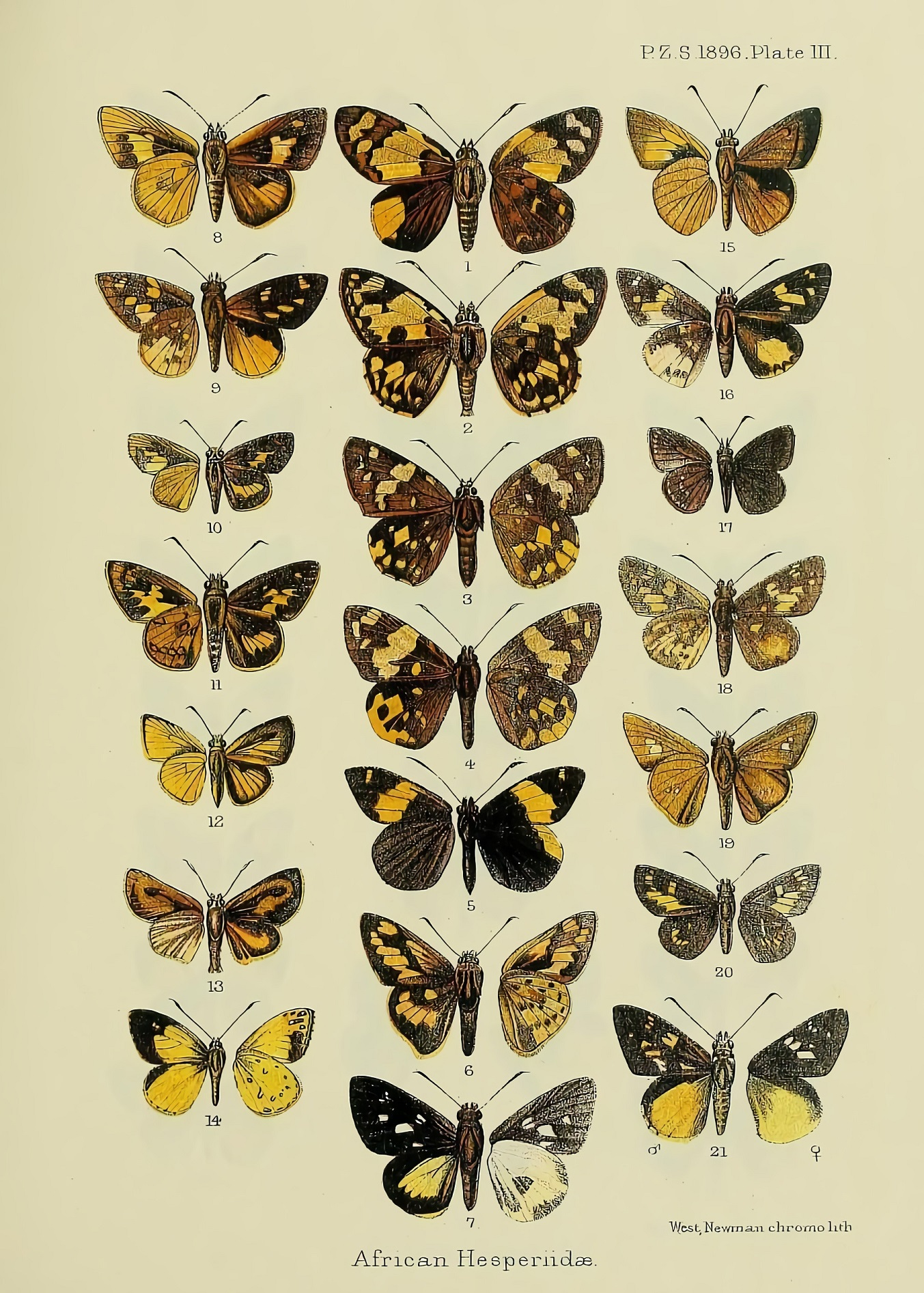
- Borbo micans figure 19

Scientific classification
- Kingdom: Animalia
- Phylum: Arthropoda
- Class: Insecta
- Order: Lepidoptera
- Family: Hesperiidae
- Genus: Borbo
- Species: B. micans

Binomial name
- Borbo micans (Holland, 1896)

Synonyms
- Parnara micans Holland, 1896

= Borbo micans =

Marsh swift

Species of butterfly

Borbo micans, the marsh swift, is a butterfly of the family Hesperiidae. It is found in tropical Africa. In South Africa it is restricted to the riverine and lowland forests of KwaZulu-Natal and swamp areas close to Manguzi Forest, the Pongola River and Kosi Bay in Maputaland. The habitat consists of swamps and marshes in open country or near streams and lakes in rainforests.

The wingspan is 32–36 mm for males and 36–40 mm for females. Adults are probably on wing year-round, but it is more common in autumn and winter in southern Africa.

The larvae probably feed on various Poaceae swamp grasses, including Hypolytrum heteromorphum.
