= Borbo fanta =

Scientific classification
- Kingdom: Animalia
- Phylum: Arthropoda
- Class: Insecta
- Order: Lepidoptera
- Family: Hesperiidae
- Genus: Borbo
- Species: B. fanta

Binomial name
- Borbo fanta (Evans, 1937)

Synonyms
- Pelopidas fanta Evans, 1937; Pelopidas fanta barnesi Evans, 1949

Species of butterfly

Borbo fanta, the Fanta swift or twin-spot swift, is a butterfly in the family Hesperiidae. It is found in the Gambia, Guinea, Sierra Leone, Ivory Coast, Ghana, Nigeria, Cameroon, Gabon, Angola, the Democratic Republic of the Congo, south-western Kenya, Tanzania, central and northern Zambia, Mozambique, eastern Zimbabwe and northern Botswana. The habitat consists of savanna and degraded forests.

The larvae feed on Bambusa vulgaris.
