= Ypthima condamini =

Scientific classification
- Domain: Eukaryota
- Kingdom: Animalia
- Phylum: Arthropoda
- Class: Insecta
- Order: Lepidoptera
- Family: Nymphalidae
- Genus: Ypthima
- Species: Y. condamini

Binomial name
- Ypthima condamini Kielland, 1982

Species of butterfly

Ypthima condamini, or Condamin's ringlet, is a butterfly of the family Nymphalidae. It is found in Ethiopia, from Sudan to South Africa and in western Africa.

The wingspan is 32–36 mm for males and 34–38 mm for females. Adults are probably on wing year round.

The larvae probably feed on Poaceae grasses.

== Subspecies ==
The species may be divided into the following subspecies:

- Ypthima condamini condamini (Eritrea, Ethiopia, Sudan, Uganda, Kenya, Tanzania, Democratic Republic of the Congo, Malawi, Zambia, Angola, Mozambique, Zimbabwe, and the Limpopo Province of South Africa)
- Ypthima condamini nigeriae Kielland, 1982 (Senegal, Gambia, Mali, Burkina Faso, Ghana, Nigeria, Niger, and Cameroon)
