= Acraea encedana =

Scientific classification
- Kingdom: Animalia
- Phylum: Arthropoda
- Clade: Pancrustacea
- Class: Insecta
- Order: Lepidoptera
- Family: Nymphalidae
- Genus: Acraea
- Species: A. encedana

Binomial name
- Acraea encedana Pierre, 1976

Synonyms
- Acraea (Actinote) encedana; Acraea encedon ab. alcippina Aurivillius, 1899; Acraea encedon ab. radiata Aurivillius, 1905; Acraea encedon f. dairalcippa Le Doux, 1923; Acraea encedon f. micropunctata Le Doux, 1931; Acraea encedon f. macropunctata Le Doux, 1931; Acraea encedon ab. radiofasciata Stoneham, 1943; Acraea encedana morph dairana Pierre, 1976

Species of butterfly

Acraea encedana, the encedana acraea or Pierre's acraea, is a butterfly in the family Nymphalidae. It is found in Senegal, Gambia, Burkina Faso, Guinea, Sierra Leone, Liberia, Ivory Coast, Ghana, Benin, Nigeria, Angola, the Democratic Republic of the Congo, Sudan, Ethiopia, Kenya, Tanzania, Malawi, Zambia and Mozambique. The habitat consists of open areas near swampy ground.

Adults feed on the flowers of Tridax species.

The larvae feed on Desmodium salicifolium.

== Mimicry ==
A. encendana is a Müllerian mimic of another butterfly which occurs in Uganda, Danaus chrysippus.

== Taxonomy ==
It is a member of the Acraea encedon species group.but see also Pierre & Bernaud, 2014

Torben Larsen developed a species numbering system for his 2005 publication Butterflies of West Africa. This species is #1154. The 'Larsen' numbers have since been used with permission in A Sharp Eye on Butterflies of Ghana.
