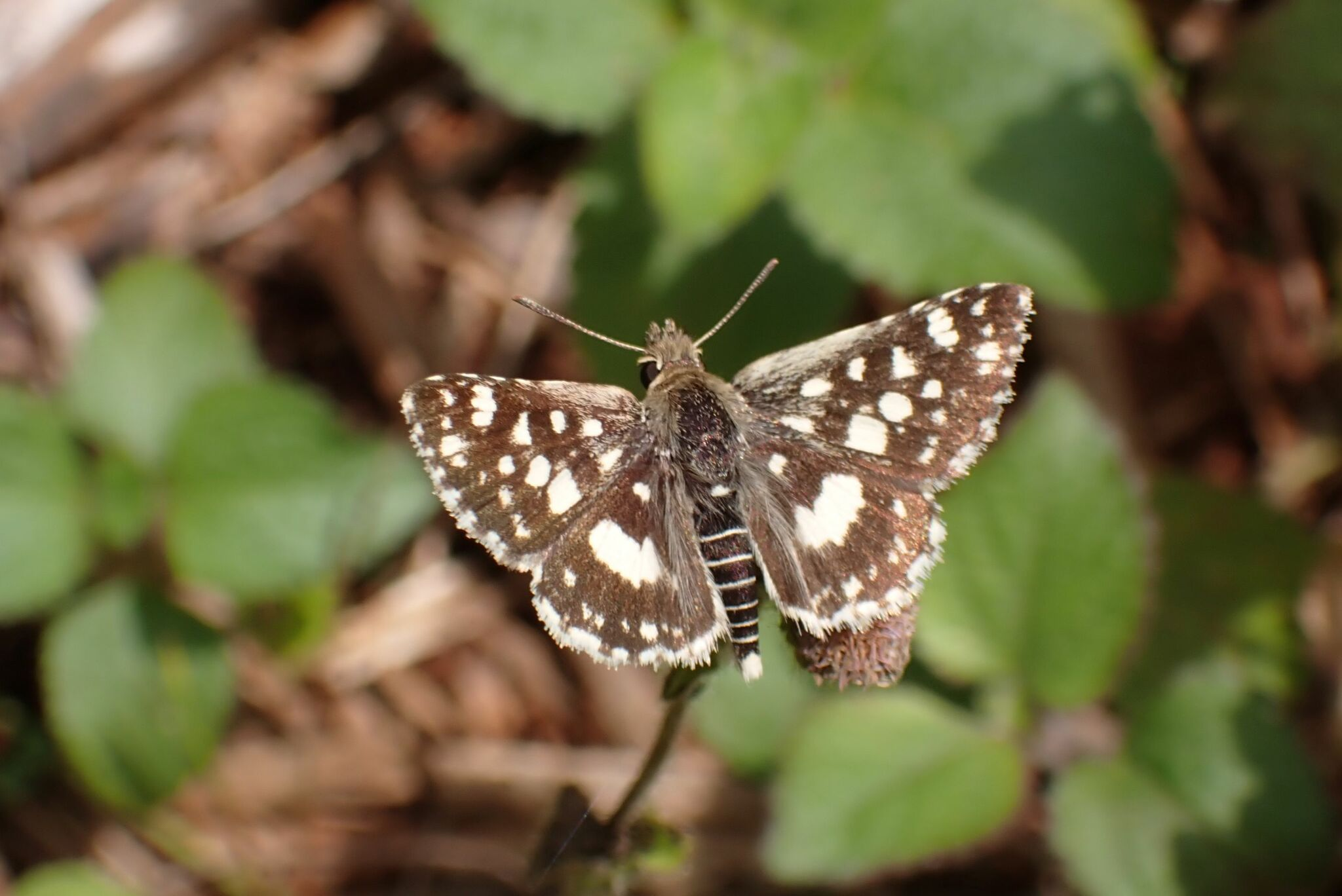

Scientific classification
- Kingdom: Animalia
- Phylum: Arthropoda
- Clade: Pancrustacea
- Class: Insecta
- Order: Lepidoptera
- Family: Hesperiidae
- Genus: Spialia
- Species: S. dromus

Binomial name
- Spialia dromus (Plötz, 1884)

Synonyms
- Pyrgus dromus Plötz, 1884; Pyrgus zaira Plötz, 1884; Syrichthus melaleuca Oberthür, 1912; Syrichthus leucomelas Oberthür, 1912; Hesperia dromus var. elongata Higgins, 1924; Hesperia dromus var. meridionalis Higgins, 1924

= Spialia dromus =

Species of butterfly

Spialia dromus, the forest sandman, dromus grizzled skipper or large grizzled skipper, is a butterfly of the family Hesperiidae. It is found in tropical Africa. In South Africa it is found along the eastern Cape coast to KwaZulu-Natal into Eswatini. It is also present in Mpumalanga and the Limpopo Province into northern Gauteng and the extreme north-west of the North West Province.

The wingspan is 23–29 mm for males and 29–32 mm for females. Adults are on wing year-round but are more common in warmer months.

The larvae feed on Triumfetta tomentosa, Triumfetta rhomboidea, Melhania and Waltheria species.

Torben Larsen developed a species numbering system for his 2005 publication Butterflies of West Africa. This species is #1267. The 'Larsen' numbers have since been used with permission in A Sharp Eye on Butterflies of Ghana.
