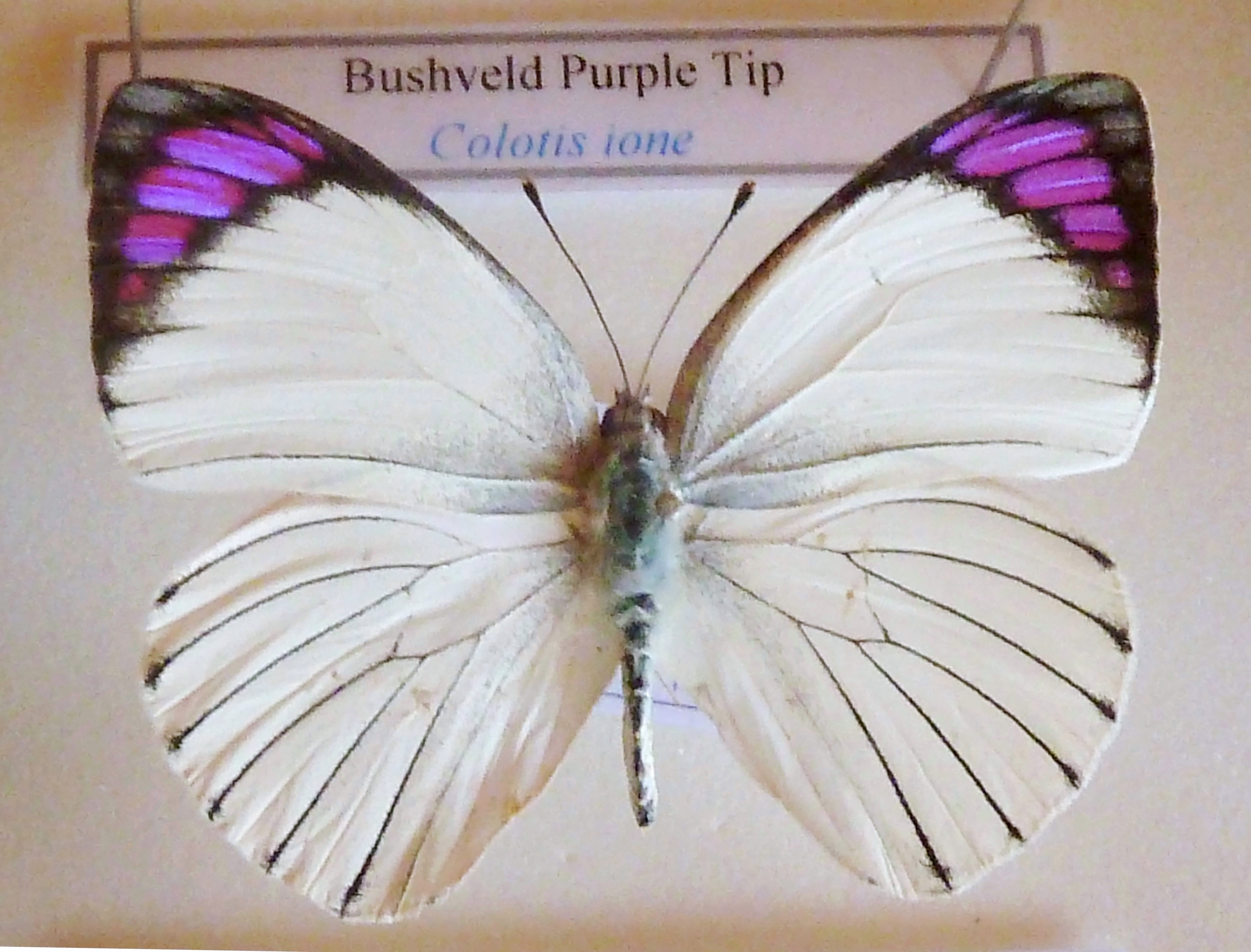

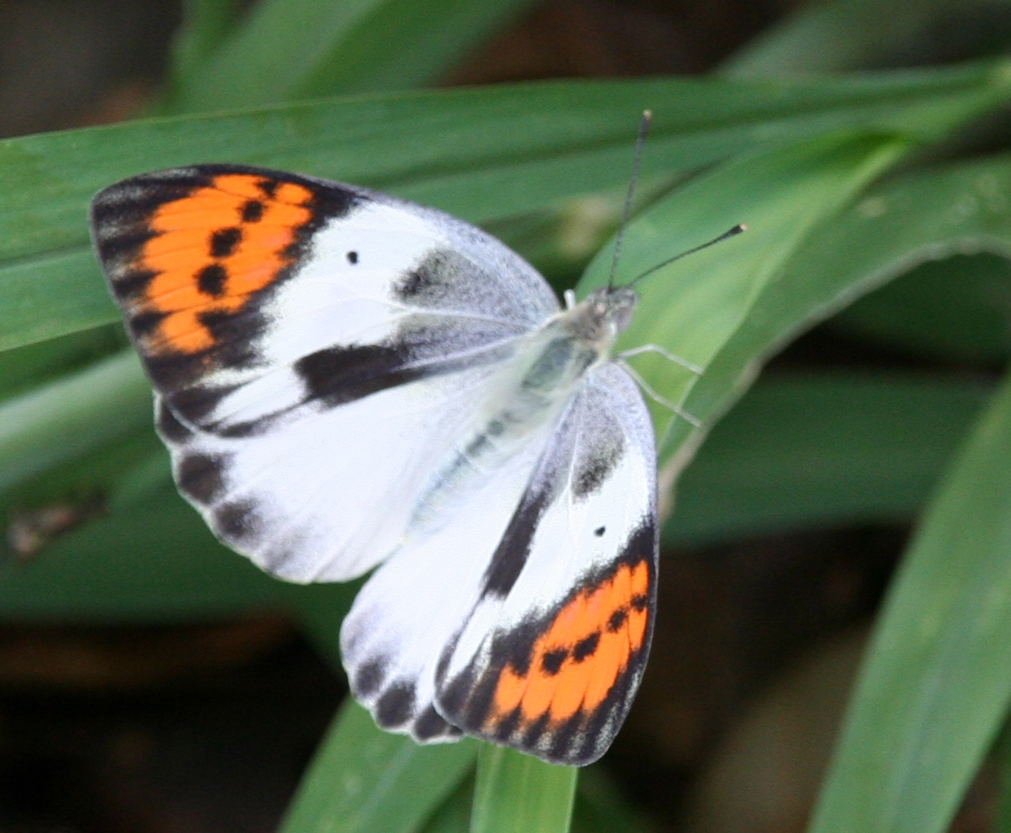
- male and female

Scientific classification
- Kingdom: Animalia
- Phylum: Arthropoda
- Clade: Pancrustacea
- Class: Insecta
- Order: Lepidoptera
- Family: Pieridae
- Genus: Colotis
- Species: C. ione

Binomial name
- Colotis ione (Godart, 1819)

Synonyms
- Pieris ione Godart, 1819; Anthocharis phlegyas Butler, 1865; Euchloe coliagenes Butler, 1867; Euchloe jalone Butler, 1869; Teracolus buxtoni Butler, 1876; Teracolus imperator Butler, 1876; Callosune jalone var. natalensis Staudinger, 1885; Teracolus bacchus Butler, 1888; Callosune mrogoroana Vuillot, 1891; Teracolus bettoni Butler, 1898; Teracolus difficilis Sharpe, 1900; Teracolus schuberti Suffert, 1904; Teracolus bacchus hydrophobus Suffert, 1904; Teracolus ione aurivillii Suffert, 1904; Teracolus bacchus f. anomalus Aurivillius, 1910; Teracolus bacchus f. rubidipuncta Joicey and Talbot, 1927; Teracolus bacchus f. obsolescens Joicey and Talbot, 1927; Colotis ione f. primularis Talbot, 1939; Colotis ione f. cardamines Talbot, 1939; Colotis ione f. leucozona Talbot, 1939; Colotis ione f. xanthozona Talbot, 1939; Colotis ione f. leda Talbot, 1939; Colotis ione f. xerophila Talbot, 1939; Colotis ione f. malindini Stoneham, 1940; Colotis ione f. sukuni Stoneham, 1940; Colotis ione f. erubescens Talbot, 1942; Colotis phlegyas ab. pierardi Dufrane, 1947; Colotis ione f. polychroma Stoneham, 1957

= Colotis ione =

Bushveld purple tip

Species of butterfly

Colotis ione, the bushveld purple tip, common purple tip, or violet tip, is a butterfly of the family Pieridae. It is found in the dry parts of Africa south of the Sahara.

The wingspan is 45–52 mm.

The larva feeds on Maerua, Boscia, Capparis, Ritchiea, and Cadaba species.

Torben Larsen developed a species numbering system for his 2005 publication Butterflies of West Africa. This species is #58. The 'Larsen' numbers have since been used with permission in A Sharp Eye on Butterflies of Ghana.
