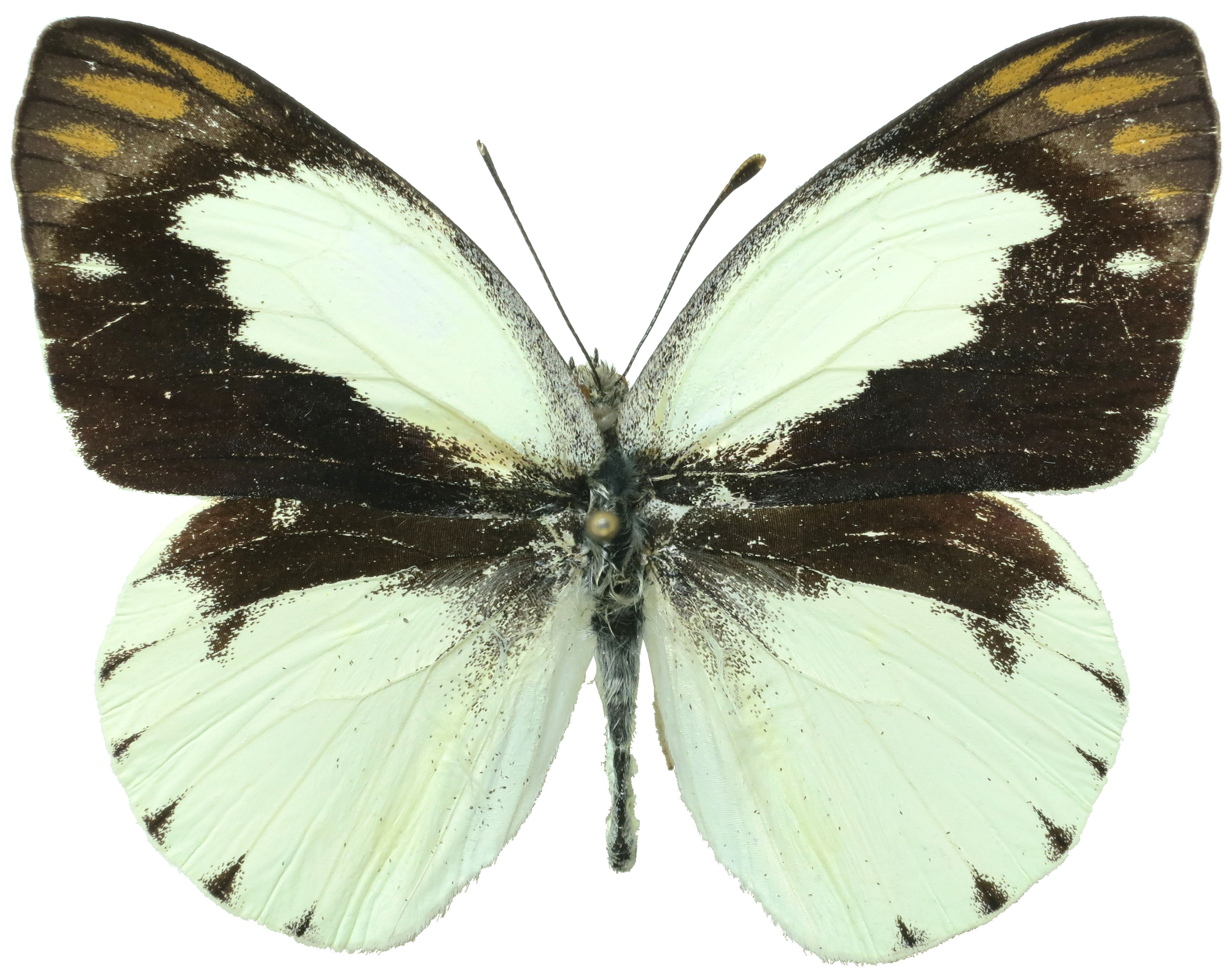
- male C. eris, Kilimanjaro Region
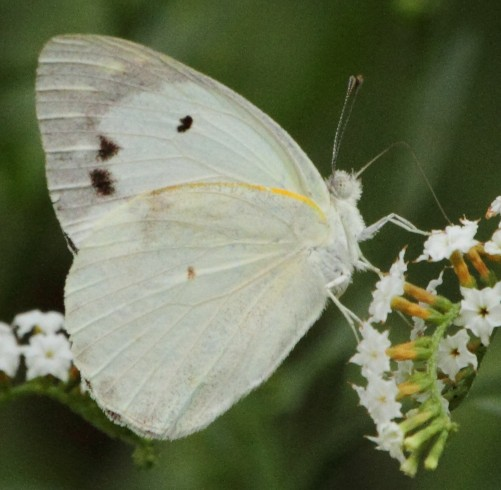
- female C. e. eris, South Africa

Scientific classification
- Kingdom: Animalia
- Phylum: Arthropoda
- Clade: Pancrustacea
- Class: Insecta
- Order: Lepidoptera
- Family: Pieridae
- Genus: Colotis
- Species: C. eris

Binomial name
- Colotis eris (Wallengren, 1857)

Synonyms
- Pieris eris Klug, 1829; Colotis (Teracolus) eris; Idmais fatma C. & R. Felder, [1865]; Teracolus abyssinicus Butler, 1876; Idmais maimuna Kirby, 1880; Teracolus opalescens Butler, 1886; Teracolus johnstoni Butler, 1886; Idmais eris var. punctigera Lanz, 1896; Teracolus teitensis Sharpe, 1898; Teracolus eris var. erioides Strand, 1912; Colotis eris eris f. chlorinos Talbot, 1939; Colotis eris damara Talbot, 1939; Colotis eris ab. continua Storace, 1948

= Colotis eris =

Banded gold tip

Species of insect

Colotis eris, the banded gold tip or black-barred gold tip, is a butterfly of the family Pieridae. It is found in the Afrotropical realm.

The wingspan is 40–45 mm. The adults have fly year-round in warm areas, peaking from March to June.

The larvae feed on Boscia albitrunca and Boscia oleoides.

== Subspecies ==
The following subspecies are recognised:

- C. e. eris — Sub-Saharan Africa, including: Mauritania, Senegal, Gambia, Mali, northern Nigeria, Sudan, Kenya, Zambia, Namibia, Zimbabwe, Botswana, Mozambique, South Africa, Eswatini
- C. e. contractus Gabriel, 1937-38 — Arabian Peninsula: Yemen, Oman
- ?C. e. johnstoni (Butler, 1886)
