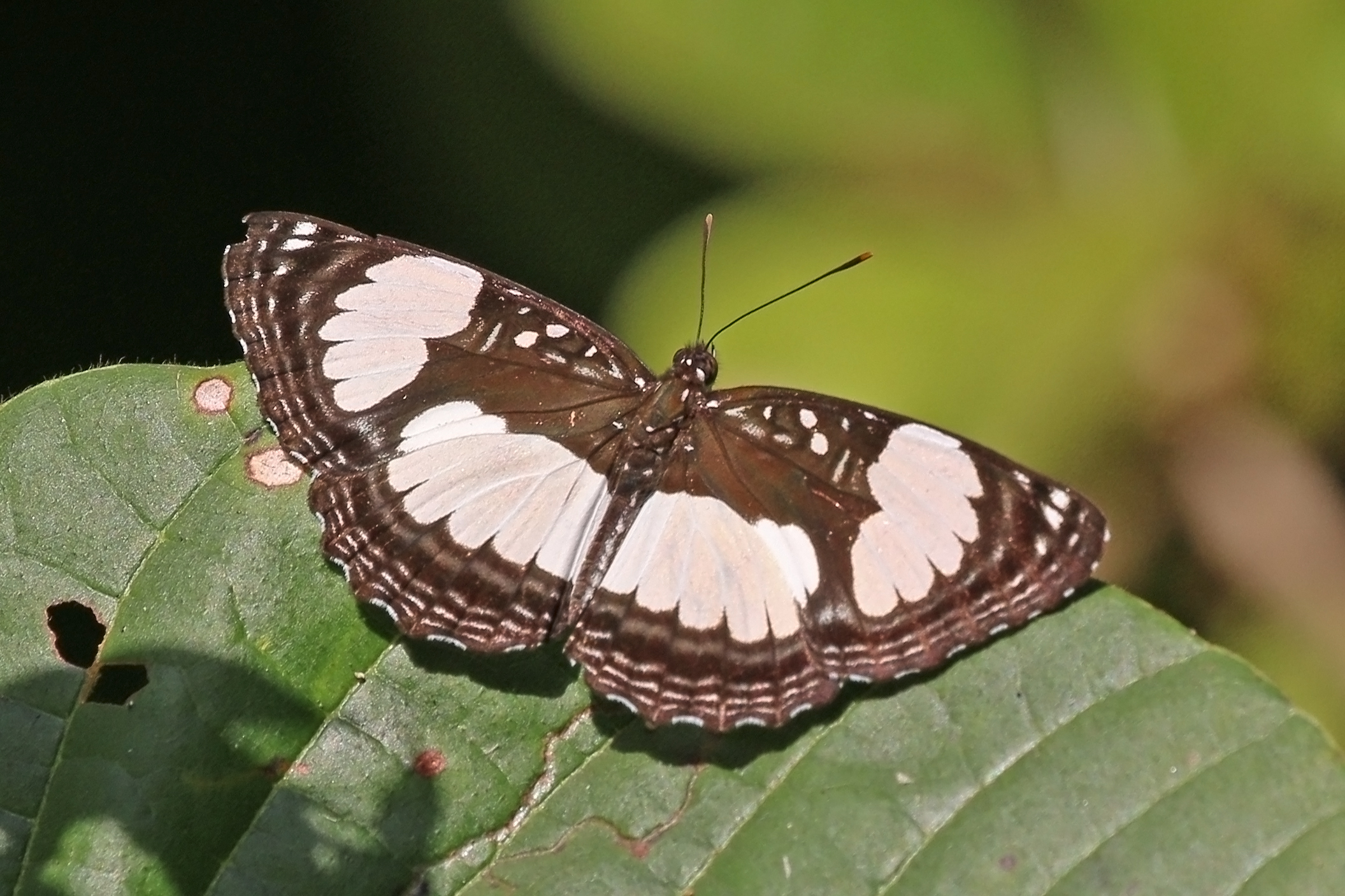
- female N. s. serena, The Gambia

Scientific classification
- Kingdom: Animalia
- Phylum: Arthropoda
- Clade: Pancrustacea
- Class: Insecta
- Order: Lepidoptera
- Family: Nymphalidae
- Genus: Neptis
- Species: N. serena

Binomial name
- Neptis serena Overlaet, 1955

Synonyms
- Neptis agatha ab. lativittata Strand, 1909; Neptis agatha ab. latvitta Strand; d'Abrera, 1980

= Neptis serena =

Species of butterfly

Neptis serena, the serene sailer or river sailer, is a butterfly in the family Nymphalidae. It is found in Senegal, Gambia, Guinea-Bissau, Guinea, Sierra Leone, Ghana, Togo, Nigeria, Cameroon, the Republic of the Congo, the Democratic Republic of the Congo, Ethiopia, Tanzania, Zambia, northern Botswana, Zimbabwe, Mozambique, South Africa and Yemen. The habitat consists of open, grassy banks of streams and rivers in forests, heavy woodland, coastal bush and savanna.

Adult males mud-puddle. Adults are on wing from April to January.

The larvae feed on Cycina species.

== Subspecies ==
- Neptis serena serena (Senegal, Gambia, Guinea-Bissau, Guinea, Sierra Leone, Ghana, Togo, Nigeria, Cameroon, Congo, Democratic Republic of the Congo, Ethiopia, Tanzania, Zambia, northern Botswana, Zimbabwe, Mozambique, South Africa: KwaZulu-Natal)
- Neptis serena annah Larsen, 1982 (Yemen)

Torben Larsen developed a species numbering system for his 2005 publication Butterflies of West Africa. The nominate subspecies is #905. The 'Larsen' numbers have since been used with permission in A Sharp Eye on Butterflies of Ghana.

== Taxonomy ==
It is a member of the Neptis agatha species group
