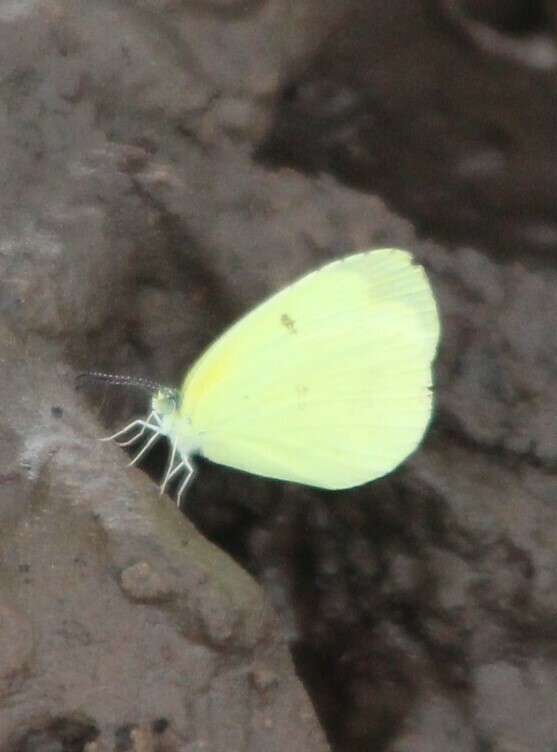

Scientific classification
- Kingdom: Animalia
- Phylum: Arthropoda
- Class: Insecta
- Order: Lepidoptera
- Family: Pieridae
- Genus: Eurema
- Species: E. hapale

Binomial name
- Eurema hapale (Mabille, 1882)

Synonyms
- Terias hapale Mabille, 1882; Eurema (Terias) hapale; Terias hapale var. hibernia Neustetter, 1916; Terias hapale f. raritas Stoneham, 1957

= Eurema hapale =

Species of butterfly

Eurema hapale, the marsh grass yellow or pale grass yellow, is a butterfly in the family Pieridae. It is found in Sub-Saharan Africa, including the Gambia, Guinea, Sierra Leone, Ivory Coast, Nigeria, Cameroon, Uganda, Kenya, Tanzania, Zambia, Mozambique, eastern Zimbabwe, northern Botswana and Madagascar. The habitat consists of marshy areas in forests and moist savanna.

Adults have a relatively weak flight and often fly in dense vegetation. They are on wing from August to September and from April to May.

The larvae feed on Albizia species.
