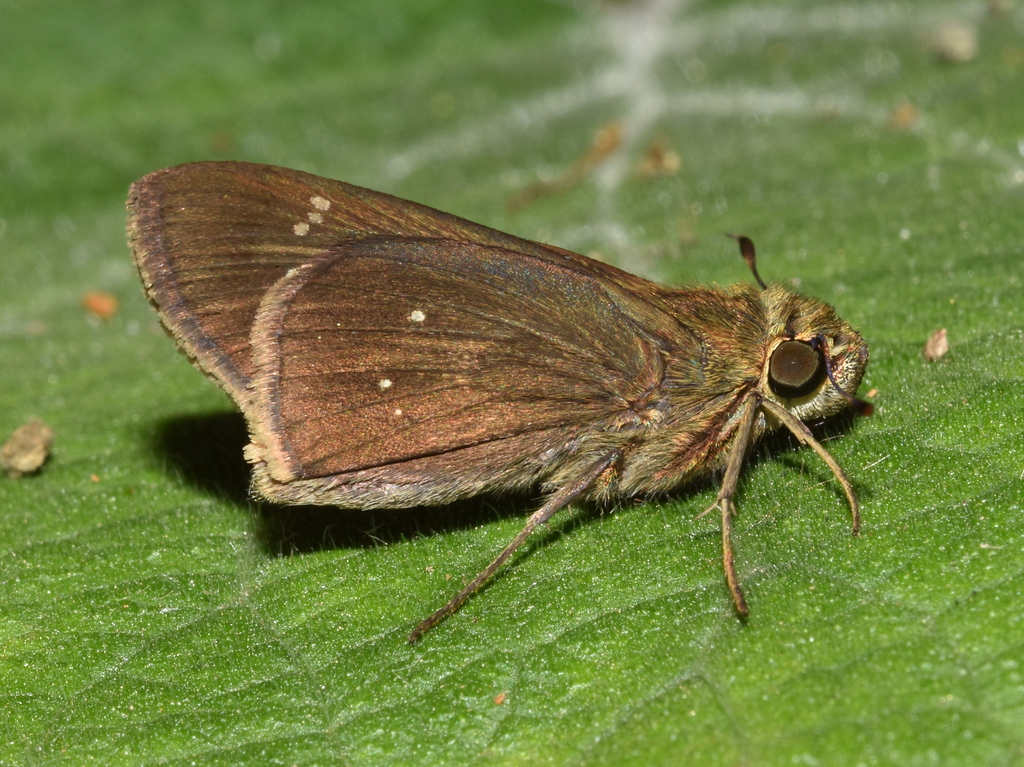

Scientific classification
- Kingdom: Animalia
- Phylum: Arthropoda
- Clade: Pancrustacea
- Class: Insecta
- Order: Lepidoptera
- Family: Hesperiidae
- Genus: Borbo
- Species: B. gemella

Binomial name
- Borbo gemella (Mabille, 1884)

Synonyms
- Pamphila gemella Mabille, 1884

= Borbo gemella =

Species of butterfly

Borbo (Torbenlarsenia) gemella, the twin swift, is a butterfly of the family Hesperiidae. It is found in several countries of Africa, including Burkina Faso (but also Madagascar island) and south-western Arabia. The habitat consists of frost-free savanna and forests.

The wingspan is about 42 mm. Adults are attracted to flowers and males mud-puddle. They are on wing year round, with a peak in March and April.

The larvae feed on Ehrharta, Triticum, Saccharum and Zea species.

Torben Larsen developed a species numbering system for his 2005 publication Butterflies of West Africa. This species is #1451. The 'Larsen' numbers have since been used with permission in A Sharp Eye on Butterflies of Ghana.
