= Ehrharta erecta =

Scientific classification
- Kingdom: Plantae
- Clade: Tracheophytes
- Clade: Angiosperms
- Clade: Monocots
- Clade: Commelinids
- Order: Poales
- Family: Poaceae
- Genus: Ehrharta
- Species: E. erecta

Binomial name
- Ehrharta erecta Lam.

Species of flowering plant

Ehrharta erecta is a species of grass commonly known as panic veldtgrass. The species is native to Southern Africa and Yemen. It is a documented invasive species in the United States, New Zealand, Australia, southern Europe and China.

The species is perennial, and normally grows to about 30 to 50 centimeters, although it may reach two meters in height. It will grow in a wide variety of habitats, even in shade.

The species has been used for birdseed, and in ecological restoration such as dune stabilization. However, it has become an invasive weed in many parts of the world. It flowers and seeds throughout the year, and its seeds germinate rapidly, forming new plants in only a few weeks.

In Ireland, E. erecta was first recorded in the 18th century, but there are earlier records from Great Britain.
