= List of butterflies of Malawi =

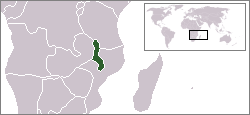
Location of Malawi

This is a list of butterflies of Malawi. About 488 species are known from Malawi, 16 of which are endemic.

== Papilionidae ==
=== Papilioninae ===
==== Papilionini ====
- Papilio nireus lyaeus Doubleday, 1845
- Papilio desmondi usambaraensis (Koçak, 1980)
- Papilio thuraui thuraui Karsch, 1900
- Papilio thuraui cyclopis Rothschild & Jordan, 1903
- Papilio thuraui heathi (Hancock, 1984)
- Papilio thuraui occidua Storace, 1951
- Papilio dardanus tibullus Kirby, 1880
- Papilio constantinus Ward, 1871
- Papilio phorcas nyikanus Rothschild & Jordan, 1903
- Papilio echerioides shirensis (Hancock, 1987)
- Papilio fuelleborni Karsch, 1900
- Papilio jacksoni nyika Cottrell, 1963
- Papilio pelodurus pelodurus Butler, 1896
- Papilio pelodurus vesper Le Cerf, 1924
- Papilio ophidicephalus mkuwadzi Gifford, 1961
- Papilio ophidicephalus niassicola Storace, 1955
- Papilio mackinnoni isokae (Hancock, 1984)

==== Leptocercini ====
- Graphium antheus (Cramer, 1779)
- Graphium policenes (Cramer, 1775)
- Graphium polistratus (Grose-Smith, 1889)
- Graphium colonna (Ward, 1873)
- Graphium porthaon (Hewitson, 1865)
- Graphium angolanus (Goeze, 1779)
- Graphium morania (Angas, 1849)
- Graphium taboranus (Oberthür, 1886)
- Graphium leonidas (Fabricius, 1793)
- Graphium philonoe (Ward, 1873)

== Pieridae ==
=== Coliadinae ===
- Eurema brigitta (Stoll, [1780])
- Eurema mandarinula (Holland, 1892)
- Eurema hecabe solifera (Butler, 1875)
- Catopsilia florella (Fabricius, 1775)
- Colias electo hecate Strecker, 1905
- Colias electo pseudohecate Berger, 1940
- Colias mukana jolyi Verhulst, 2006

=== Pierinae ===
- Colotis antevippe gavisa (Wallengren, 1857)
- Colotis aurigineus (Butler, 1883)
- Colotis celimene (Lucas, 1852)
- Colotis danae annae (Wallengren, 1857)
- Colotis dissociatus (Butler, 1897)
- Colotis euippe omphale (Godart, 1819)
- Colotis evenina casta (Gerstaecker, 1871)
- Colotis hildebrandtii (Staudinger, 1884)
- Colotis pallene (Hopffer, 1855)
- Colotis regina (Trimen, 1863)
- Colotis vesta mutans (Butler, 1877)
- Colotis subfasciatus ducissa (Dognin, 1891)
- Pinacopterix eriphia (Godart, [1819])
- Nepheronia argia mhondana (Suffert, 1904)
- Nepheronia thalassina sinalata (Suffert, 1904)

==== Pierini ====
- Appias phaola isokani (Grose-Smith, 1889)
- Appias sabina phoebe (Butler, 1901)
- Appias sylvia nyasana (Butler, 1897)
- Mylothris agathina (Cramer, 1779)
- Mylothris crawshayi Butler, 1896
- Mylothris rubricosta attenuata Talbot, 1944
- Mylothris rueppellii rhodesiana Riley, 1921
- Mylothris sagala dentatus Butler, 1896
- Mylothris similis Lathy, 1906
- Mylothris yulei Butler, 1897
- Dixeia doxo parva Talbot, 1943
- Belenois aurota (Fabricius, 1793)
- Belenois calypso crawshayi Butler, 1894
- Belenois creona severina (Stoll, 1781)
- Belenois rubrosignata kongwana Talbot, 1943
- Belenois thysa (Hopffer, 1855)
- Belenois welwitschii Rogenhofer, 1890
- Belenois zochalia agrippinides (Holland, 1896)

== Lycaenidae ==
=== Miletinae ===
==== Liphyrini ====
- Aslauga latifurca Cottrell, 1981
- Aslauga marshalli Butler, 1899

==== Miletini ====
- Spalgis lemolea Druce, 1890
- Lachnocnema bibulus (Fabricius, 1793)
- Lachnocnema pseudobibulus Libert, 1996
- Lachnocnema durbani Trimen & Bowker, 1887
- Lachnocnema brimoides Libert, 1996

=== Poritiinae ===
==== Liptenini ====
- Alaena amazoula nyasana Hawker-Smith, 1933
- Alaena lamborni Gifford, 1965
- Alaena nyassa Hewitson, 1877
- Alaena ochracea Gifford, 1965
- Alaena picata interrupta Hawker-Smith, 1933
- Alaena reticulata Butler, 1896
- Pentila carcassoni Stempffer & Bennett, 1961
- Pentila pauli nyassana Aurivillius, 1899
- Pentila tropicalis fuscipunctata Henning & Henning, 1994
- Ornipholidotos peucetia (Hewitson, 1866)
- Cooksonia aliciae Talbot, 1935
- Mimacraea costleyi Druce, 1912
- Mimacraea marshalli Trimen, 1898
- Teriomima puella Kirby, 1887
- Teriomima puellaris (Trimen, 1894)
- Baliochila neavei Stempffer & Bennett, 1953
- Baliochila hildegarda (Kirby, 1887)
- Baliochila lipara Stempffer & Bennett, 1953
- Baliochila nyasae Stempffer & Bennett, 1953
- Baliochila woodi (Riley, 1943)
- Cnodontes vansomereni Stempffer & Bennett, 1953

==== Epitolini ====
- Deloneura ochrascens littoralis Talbot, 1935
- Deloneura subfusca Hawker-Smith, 1933

=== Aphnaeinae ===
- Lipaphnaeus aderna spindasoides (Aurivillius, 1916)
- Chloroselas pseudozeritis (Trimen, 1873)
- Crudaria leroma (Wallengren, 1857)
- Cigaritis apelles (Oberthür, 1878)
- Cigaritis ella (Hewitson, 1865)
- Cigaritis homeyeri (Dewitz, 1887)
- Cigaritis natalensis (Westwood, 1851)
- Cigaritis nyassae (Butler, 1884)
- Cigaritis phanes (Trimen, 1873)
- Cigaritis trimeni (Neave, 1910)
- Cigaritis victoriae (Butler, 1884)
- Axiocerses tjoane (Wallengren, 1857)
- Axiocerses nyika Quickelberge, 1984
- Axiocerses coalescens Henning & Henning, 1996
- Axiocerses karinae Henning & Henning, 1996
- Axiocerses bamptoni Henning & Henning, 1996
- Axiocerses amanga (Westwood, 1881)
- Axiocerses punicea (Grose-Smith, 1889)
- Aloeides conradsi angoniensis Tite & Dickson, 1973
- Aloeides molomo handmani Tite & Dickson, 1973
- Aphnaeus erikssoni rex Aurivillius, 1909
- Aphnaeus flavescens Stempffer, 1954
- Aphnaeus hutchinsonii Trimen & Bowker, 1887

=== Theclinae ===
- Myrina dermaptera nyassae Talbot, 1935
- Hypolycaena auricostalis (Butler, 1897)
- Hypolycaena buxtoni Hewitson, 1874
- Hypolycaena hatita japhusa Riley, 1921
- Hypolycaena lochmophila Tite, 1967
- Hypolycaena pachalica Butler, 1888
- Leptomyrina hirundo (Wallengren, 1857)
- Leptomyrina handmani Gifford, 1965
- Iolaus alienus Trimen, 1898
- Iolaus bakeri (Riley, 1928)
- Iolaus congdoni (Kielland, 1985)
- Iolaus handmani (Gifford, 1965)
- Iolaus mimosae rhodosense (Stempffer & Bennett, 1959)
- Iolaus nasisii (Riley, 1928)
- Iolaus sidus Trimen, 1864
- Iolaus violacea (Riley, 1928)
- Iolaus trimeni Wallengren, 1875
- Iolaus lalos (Druce, 1896)
- Iolaus ndolae (Stempffer & Bennett, 1958)
- Iolaus silarus Druce, 1885
- Stugeta bowkeri nyasana Talbot, 1935
- Pilodeudorix kafuensis (Neave, 1910)
- Pilodeudorix camerona katanga (Clench, 1965)
- Pilodeudorix zeloides (Butler, 1901)
- Deudorix caliginosa Lathy, 1903
- Deudorix dariaves Hewitson, 1877
- Deudorix dinochares Grose-Smith, 1887
- Deudorix dinomenes Grose-Smith, 1887
- Deudorix diocles Hewitson, 1869
- Deudorix ecaudata Gifford, 1963
- Deudorix lorisona coffea Jackson, 1966
- Deudorix magda Gifford, 1963
- Deudorix montana (Kielland, 1985)
- Deudorix vansoni Pennington, 1948
- Capys brunneus Aurivillius, 1916
- Capys catharus Riley, 1932
- Capys connexivus Butler, 1897

=== Polyommatinae ===
==== Lycaenesthini ====
- Anthene butleri livida (Trimen, 1881)
- Anthene chirinda (Bethune-Baker, 1910)
- Anthene contrastata mashuna (Stevenson, 1937)
- Anthene crawshayi (Butler, 1899)
- Anthene kersteni (Gerstaecker, 1871)
- Anthene lasti (Grose-Smith & Kirby, 1894)
- Anthene lemnos (Hewitson, 1878)
- Anthene ligures (Hewitson, 1874)
- Anthene liodes (Hewitson, 1874)
- Anthene nigropunctata (Bethune-Baker, 1910)
- Anthene otacilia (Trimen, 1868)
- Anthene rubricinctus anadema (Druce, 1905)
- Anthene nigeriae (Aurivillius, 1905)
- Lycaena phlaeas abbottii (Holland, 1892)

==== Polyommatini ====
- Uranothauma antinorii felthami (Stevenson, 1934)
- Uranothauma confusa Kielland, 1989
- Uranothauma crawshayi Butler, 1895
- Uranothauma cuneatum Tite, 1958
- Uranothauma falkensteini (Dewitz, 1879)
- Uranothauma heritsia virgo (Butler, 1896)
- Uranothauma poggei (Dewitz, 1879)
- Uranothauma uganda Kielland, 1980
- Uranothauma vansomereni Stempffer, 1951
- Uranothauma williamsi Carcasson, 1961
- Cacyreus virilis Stempffer, 1936
- Harpendyreus hazelae Stempffer, 1973
- Harpendyreus juno (Butler, 1897)
- Tuxentius calice (Hopffer, 1855)
- Tuxentius ertli (Aurivillius, 1907)
- Tuxentius melaena (Trimen & Bowker, 1887)
- Tarucus sybaris (Hopffer, 1855)
- Zintha hintza (Trimen, 1864)
- Actizera stellata (Trimen, 1883)
- Eicochrysops messapus mahallakoaena (Wallengren, 1857)
- Euchrysops barkeri (Trimen, 1893)
- Euchrysops subpallida Bethune-Baker, 1923
- Euchrysops unigemmata (Butler, 1895)
- Thermoniphas colorata (Ungemach, 1932)
- Oboronia bueronica Karsch, 1895
- Lepidochrysops aethiopia (Bethune-Baker, [1923])
- Lepidochrysops auratus Quickelberge, 1979
- Lepidochrysops chalceus Quickelberge, 1979
- Lepidochrysops chloauges (Bethune-Baker, [1923])
- Lepidochrysops delicata (Bethune-Baker, [1923])
- Lepidochrysops desmondi Stempffer, 1951
- Lepidochrysops dollmani (Bethune-Baker, [1923])
- Lepidochrysops glauca (Trimen & Bowker, 1887)
- Lepidochrysops handmani Quickelberge, 1980
- Lepidochrysops intermedia intermedia (Bethune-Baker, [1923])
- Lepidochrysops intermedia cottrelli Stempffer, 1954
- Lepidochrysops kocak Seven, 1997
- Lepidochrysops longifalces Tite, 1961
- Lepidochrysops loveni (Aurivillius, 1922)
- Lepidochrysops neavei neavei (Bethune-Baker, [1923])
- Lepidochrysops neavei nolani Williams, 2002
- Lepidochrysops nyika Tite, 1961
- Lepidochrysops pampolis (Druce, 1905)
- Lepidochrysops patricia (Trimen & Bowker, 1887)
- Lepidochrysops peculiaris hypoleucus (Butler, 1893)
- Lepidochrysops plebeia (Butler, 1898)
- Lepidochrysops solwezii (Bethune-Baker, [1923])

== Riodinidae ==
=== Nemeobiinae ===
- Abisara delicata Lathy, 1901

== Nymphalidae ==
=== Libytheinae ===
- Libythea labdaca laius Trimen, 1879

=== Danainae ===
==== Danaini ====
- Danaus chrysippus orientis (Aurivillius, 1909)
- Tirumala petiverana (Doubleday, 1847)
- Amauris niavius dominicanus Trimen, 1879
- Amauris tartarea damoclides Staudinger, 1896
- Amauris albimaculata latifascia Talbot, 1940
- Amauris crawshayi Butler, 1897
- Amauris echeria lobengula (Sharpe, 1890)
- Amauris echeria serica Talbot, 1940
- Amauris echeria whytei Butler, 1894
- Amauris ellioti junia (Le Cerf, 1920)
- Amauris ochlea ochlea (Boisduval, 1847)
- Amauris ochlea bumilleri Lanz, 1896

=== Satyrinae ===
==== Melanitini ====
- Gnophodes betsimena diversa (Butler, 1880)
- Melanitis libya Distant, 1882
- Aphysoneura pigmentaria latilimba Le Cerf, 1919
- Aphysoneura pigmentaria obnubila Riley, 1923

==== Satyrini ====
- Bicyclus angulosa selousi (Trimen, 1895)
- Bicyclus anynana (Butler, 1879)
- Bicyclus campina (Aurivillius, 1901)
- Bicyclus cottrelli (van Son, 1952)
- Bicyclus ena (Hewitson, 1877)
- Bicyclus simulacris Kielland, 1990
- Bicyclus vansoni Condamin, 1965
- Heteropsis perspicua (Trimen, 1873)
- Heteropsis simonsii (Butler, 1877)
- Heteropsis ubenica (Thurau, 1903)
- Ypthima condamini Kielland, 1982
- Ypthima granulosa Butler, 1883
- Ypthima pupillaris obscurata Kielland, 1982
- Neocoenyra bioculata bioculata Carcasson, 1964
- Neocoenyra bioculata murphyi Collins, 1997
- Neocoenyra fulleborni Thurau, 1903
- Neocoenyra kivuensis Seydel, 1929
- Neocoenyra paralellopupillata (Karsch, 1897)
- Neocoenyra ypthimoides Butler, 1894
- Coenyropsis bera (Hewitson, 1877)
- Physcaeneura pione Godman, 1880
- Neita extensa (Butler, 1898)

=== Charaxinae ===
==== Charaxini ====
- Charaxes acuminatus acuminatus Thurau, 1903
- Charaxes acuminatus mlanji van Someren, 1963
- Charaxes acuminatus nyika van Someren, 1963
- Charaxes protoclea azota (Hewitson, 1877)
- Charaxes macclounii Butler, 1895
- Charaxes saturnus Butler, 1866
- Charaxes castor flavifasciatus Butler, 1895
- Charaxes brutus natalensis Staudinger, 1885
- Charaxes ansorgei levicki Poulton, 1933
- Charaxes pollux geminus Rothschild, 1900
- Charaxes dowsetti Henning, 1989
- Charaxes druceanus proximans Joicey & Talbot, 1922
- Charaxes bohemani Felder & Felder, 1859
- Charaxes xiphares ludovici Rousseau-Decelle, 1933
- Charaxes xiphares woodi van Someren, 1964
- Charaxes cithaeron nyasae van Someren, 1964
- Charaxes violetta melloni Fox, 1963
- Charaxes ameliae amelina Joicey & Talbot, 1925
- Charaxes pythodoris ventersi Henning, 1982
- Charaxes etesipe tavetensis Rothschild, 1894
- Charaxes penricei Rothschild, 1900
- Charaxes achaemenes Felder & Felder, 1867
- Charaxes jahlusa argynnides Westwood, 1864
- Charaxes eupale veneris White & Grant, 1989
- Charaxes dilutus dilutus Rothschild, 1898
- Charaxes dilutus kasitu White & Grant, 1989
- Charaxes baumanni whytei Butler, 1894
- Charaxes nyikensis van Someren, 1975
- Charaxes ethalion handmani Henning, 1982
- Charaxes ethalion kitungulensis Strand, 1911
- Charaxes chintechi van Someren, 1975
- Charaxes phaeus Hewitson, 1877
- Charaxes fionae Henning, 1977
- Charaxes aubyni australis van Someren & Jackson, 1957
- Charaxes martini martini van Someren, 1966
- Charaxes martini helenae Henning, 1982
- Charaxes guderiana (Dewitz, 1879)
- Charaxes zoolina (Westwood, [1850])
- Charaxes nichetes leoninus Butler, 1895

==== Euxanthini ====
- Charaxes wakefieldi (Ward, 1873)

=== Apaturinae ===
- Apaturopsis cleochares schultzei Schmidt, 1921

=== Nymphalinae ===
==== Nymphalini ====
- Antanartia schaeneia dubia Howarth, 1966
- Vanessa dimorphica (Howarth, 1966)
- Junonia artaxia Hewitson, 1864
- Junonia natalica (Felder & Felder, 1860)
- Junonia sophia infracta Butler, 1888
- Junonia terea elgiva Hewitson, 1864
- Salamis cacta eileenae Henning & Joannou, 1994
- Protogoniomorpha parhassus (Drury, 1782)
- Precis actia Distant, 1880
- Precis cuama (Hewitson, 1864)
- Precis sinuata Plötz, 1880
- Precis tugela aurorina (Butler, 1894)
- Hypolimnas deceptor (Trimen, 1873)
- Hypolimnas misippus (Linnaeus, 1764)

=== Cyrestinae ===
==== Cyrestini ====
- Cyrestis camillus sublineata Lathy, 1901

=== Biblidinae ===
==== Biblidini ====
- Neptidopsis ophione nucleata Grünberg, 1911
- Eurytela dryope angulata Aurivillius, 1899
- Eurytela hiarbas lita Rothschild & Jordan, 1903

==== Epicaliini ====
- Sevenia boisduvali (Wallengren, 1857)
- Sevenia morantii (Trimen, 1881)
- Sevenia pechueli rhodesiana (Rothschild, 1918)
- Sevenia rosa (Hewitson, 1877)

=== Limenitinae ===
==== Limenitidini ====
- Harma theobene superna (Fox, 1968)
- Cymothoe coranus dowsetti Beaurain, 1988
- Cymothoe coranus murphyi Beaurain, 1988
- Cymothoe cottrelli Rydon, 1980
- Cymothoe melanjae Bethune-Baker, 1926
- Cymothoe zombana Bethune-Baker, 1926
- Pseudacraea boisduvalii trimenii Butler, 1874
- Pseudacraea deludens deludens Neave, 1912
- Pseudacraea deludens murphyi Hecq, 1991
- Pseudacraea eurytus conradti Oberthür, 1893
- Pseudacraea lucretia expansa (Butler, 1878)
- Pseudacraea poggei (Dewitz, 1879)

==== Neptidini ====
- Neptis alta Overlaet, 1955
- Neptis aurivillii Schultze, 1913
- Neptis carcassoni Van Son, 1959
- Neptis incongrua Butler, 1896
- Neptis jordani Neave, 1910
- Neptis kiriakoffi Overlaet, 1955
- Neptis swynnertoni Trimen, 1912
- Neptis trigonophora Butler, 1878

==== Adoliadini ====
- Catuna sikorana Rogenhofer, 1889
- Euryphura achlys (Hopffer, 1855)
- Euryphura concordia (Hopffer, 1855)
- Pseudargynnis hegemone (Godart, 1819)
- Aterica galene theophane Hopffer, 1855
- Bebearia orientis malawiensis Holmes, 2001
- Euphaedra zaddachii crawshayi Butler, 1895
- Euphaedra nigrobasalis ceramica Hecq, 1991
- Euphaedra orientalis Rothschild, 1898
- Euphaedra murphyi Hecq, 1991
- Euphaedra neophron (Hopffer, 1855)
- Euptera kinugnana (Grose-Smith, 1889)

=== Heliconiinae ===
==== Acraeini ====
- Acraea acara Hewitson, 1865
- Acraea anemosa Hewitson, 1865
- Acraea boopis choloui Pierre, 1979
- Acraea cuva Grose-Smith, 1889
- Acraea insignis Distant, 1880
- Acraea machequena Grose-Smith, 1887
- Acraea neobule Doubleday, 1847
- Acraea pseudolycia astrigera Butler, 1899
- Acraea quirina rosa Eltringham, 1912
- Acraea rabbaiae perlucida Henning & Henning, 1996
- Acraea zetes (Linnaeus, 1758)
- Acraea zonata Hewitson, 1877
- Acraea acrita Hewitson, 1865
- Acraea asema Hewitson, 1877
- Acraea chaeribula Oberthür, 1893
- Acraea chambezi Neave, 1910
- Acraea egina areca Mabille, 1889
- Acraea periphanes Oberthür, 1893
- Acraea petraea Boisduval, 1847
- Acraea punctellata Eltringham, 1912
- Acraea atergatis Westwood, 1881
- Acraea axina Westwood, 1881
- Acraea caecilia pudora Aurivillius, 1910
- Acraea caldarena Hewitson, 1877
- Acraea leucopyga Aurivillius, 1904
- Acraea pudorella Aurivillius, 1899
- Acraea aganice nicega (Suffert, 1904)
- Acraea aganice nyassae (Carpenter, 1920)
- Acraea epaea melina (Thurau, 1903)
- Acraea scalivittata (Butler, 1896)
- Acraea acuta Howarth, 1969
- Acraea alicia (Sharpe, 1890)
- Acraea baxteri Sharpe, 1902
- Acraea cabira Hopffer, 1855
- Acraea encedana Pierre, 1976
- Acraea serena (Fabricius, 1775)
- Acraea esebria Hewitson, 1861
- Acraea goetzei Thurau, 1903
- Acraea johnstoni Godman, 1885
- Acraea burni Butler, 1896
- Acraea pentapolis epidica Oberthür, 1893
- Acraea pharsalus pharsaloides Holland, 1892
- Acraea sotikensis Sharpe, 1892
- Acraea ventura Hewitson, 1877
- Acraea bomba Grose-Smith, 1889
- Acraea induna Trimen, 1895
- Acraea parei orangica (Henning & Henning, 1996)
- Acraea rahira Boisduval, 1833
- Acraea igola Trimen & Bowker, 1889
- Acraea perenna thesprio Oberthür, 1893

==== Argynnini ====
- Issoria smaragdifera (Butler, 1895)

==== Vagrantini ====
- Phalanta eurytis (Doubleday, 1847)
- Phalanta phalantha aethiopica (Rothschild & Jordan, 1903)

== Hesperiidae ==
=== Coeliadinae ===
- Coeliades forestan (Stoll, [1782])
- Coeliades pisistratus (Fabricius, 1793)
- Coeliades sejuncta (Mabille & Vuillot, 1891)

=== Pyrginae ===
==== Celaenorrhinini ====
- Celaenorrhinus galenus biseriata (Butler, 1888)
- Celaenorrhinus handmani Collins & Congdon, 1998
- Celaenorrhinus zanqua Evans, 1937
- Eretis djaelaelae (Wallengren, 1857)
- Eretis melania Mabille, 1891
- Eretis umbra nox (Neave, 1910)
- Sarangesa astrigera Butler, 1894
- Sarangesa haplopa Swinhoe, 1907
- Sarangesa laelius (Mabille, 1877)
- Sarangesa lucidella (Mabille, 1891)
- Sarangesa maculata (Mabille, 1891)
- Sarangesa ruona Evans, 1937
- Sarangesa seineri Strand, 1909

==== Tagiadini ====
- Tagiades flesus (Fabricius, 1781)
- Eagris nottoana (Wallengren, 1857)
- Eagris sabadius ochreana Lathy, 1901
- Calleagris hollandi (Butler, 1897)
- Calleagris jamesoni (Sharpe, 1890)
- Caprona adelica Karsch, 1892
- Netrobalane canopus (Trimen, 1864)
- Leucochitonea levubu Wallengren, 1857
- Abantis arctomarginata Lathy, 1901
- Abantis paradisea (Butler, 1870)
- Abantis tettensis Hopffer, 1855
- Abantis venosa Trimen & Bowker, 1889
- Abantis zambesiaca (Westwood, 1874)

==== Carcharodini ====
- Spialia confusa Evans, 1937
- Spialia depauperata (Strand, 1911)
- Spialia mafa (Trimen, 1870)
- Spialia secessus (Trimen, 1891)

=== Hesperiinae ===
==== Aeromachini ====
- Astictopterus stellata mineni (Trimen, 1894)
- Ampittia capenas (Hewitson, 1868)
- Kedestes brunneostriga (Plötz, 1884)
- Kedestes lema linka Evans, 1956
- Kedestes mohozutza (Wallengren, 1857)
- Kedestes fenestratus (Butler, 1894)
- Gorgyra bibulus Riley, 1929
- Gorgyra johnstoni (Butler, 1894)
- Teniorhinus harona (Westwood, 1881)
- Teniorhinus herilus (Hopffer, 1855)
- Xanthodisca vibius (Hewitson, 1878)
- Acada biseriata (Mabille, 1893)
- Parosmodes morantii (Trimen, 1873)
- Acleros mackenii (Trimen, 1868)
- Acleros ploetzi Mabille, 1890
- Semalea arela (Mabille, 1891)
- Semalea pulvina (Plötz, 1879)
- Meza larea (Neave, 1910)
- Andronymus caesar philander (Hopffer, 1855)
- Andronymus fenestrella Bethune-Baker, 1908
- Andronymus neander (Plötz, 1884)
- Chondrolepis niveicornis (Plötz, 1883)
- Chondrolepis telisignata (Butler, 1896)
- Artitropa erinnys nyasae Riley, 1925
- Artitropa reducta Aurivillius, 1925
- Leona leonora dux Evans, 1937
- Caenides soritia (Hewitson, 1876)
- Monza punctata (Aurivillius, 1910)
- Fresna nyassae (Hewitson, 1878)
- Platylesches affinissima Strand, 1921
- Platylesches galesa (Hewitson, 1877)
- Platylesches lamba Neave, 1910
- Platylesches langa Evans, 1937
- Platylesches picanini (Holland, 1894)
- Platylesches rasta Evans, 1937
- Platylesches robustus Neave, 1910
- Platylesches tina Evans, 1937

==== Baorini ====
- Zenonia anax Evans, 1937
- Borbo fallax (Gaede, 1916)
- Borbo holtzi (Plötz, 1883)
- Borbo lugens (Hopffer, 1855)
- Borbo perobscura (Druce, 1912)

=== Heteropterinae ===
- Metisella abdeli (Krüger, 1928)
- Metisella decipiens (Butler, 1896)
- Metisella formosus (Butler, 1894)
- Metisella medea nyika Evans, 1937
- Metisella midas (Butler, 1894)
- Metisella perexcellens (Butler, 1896)
- Metisella quadrisignatus (Butler, 1894)
- Metisella willemi (Wallengren, 1857)

== See also ==
- Wildlife of Malawi
- Geography of Malawi
- List of ecoregions in Malawi
