= Pseudacraea deludens =

Scientific classification
- Domain: Eukaryota
- Kingdom: Animalia
- Phylum: Arthropoda
- Class: Insecta
- Order: Lepidoptera
- Family: Nymphalidae
- Genus: Pseudacraea
- Species: P. deludens

Binomial name
- Pseudacraea deludens Neave, 1912

Synonyms
- Pseudacraea amaurina Neustetter, 1928

Species of butterfly

Pseudacraea deludens is a butterfly in the family Nymphalidae. It is found in the Democratic Republic of the Congo, Uganda, Rwanda, Kenya, Tanzania, Malawi and Zambia. The habitat consists of montane forests.

In flight, the nominate subspecies is almost impossible to distinguish from its model, Amauris echeria. Subspecies morogoro mimics Amauris echeria serica, subspecies tanganyikae mimics Amauris echeria terrena and subspecies reducta mimics Amauris albimaculata hanningtoni

The larvae feed on Chrysophyllum gorungosanum.

== Subspecies ==
- Pseudacraea deludens deludens (Malawi)
- Pseudacraea deludens amaurina Neustetter, 1928 (southern Tanzania, Zambia)
- Pseudacraea deludens ducarmei Hecq, 1990 (north-eastern Democratic Republic of the Congo)
- Pseudacraea deludens echerioides Talbot, 1941 (Uganda: Mount Elgon, Kenya: Mount Elgon and Nandi)
- Pseudacraea deludens morogoro Kielland, 1990 (Tanzania: highlands of the north-east)
- Pseudacraea deludens murphyi Hecq, 1991 (Malawi)
- Pseudacraea deludens reducta Kielland, 1990 (north-eastern Tanzania)
- Pseudacraea deludens rwandaensis Hecq, 1991 (Rwanda)
- Pseudacraea deludens tanganyikae Kielland, 1990 (Tanzania: west to the Mpanda and Kigoma districts)
- Pseudacraea deludens terrena Jackson, 1956 (Uganda: south-west to Kigezi)
