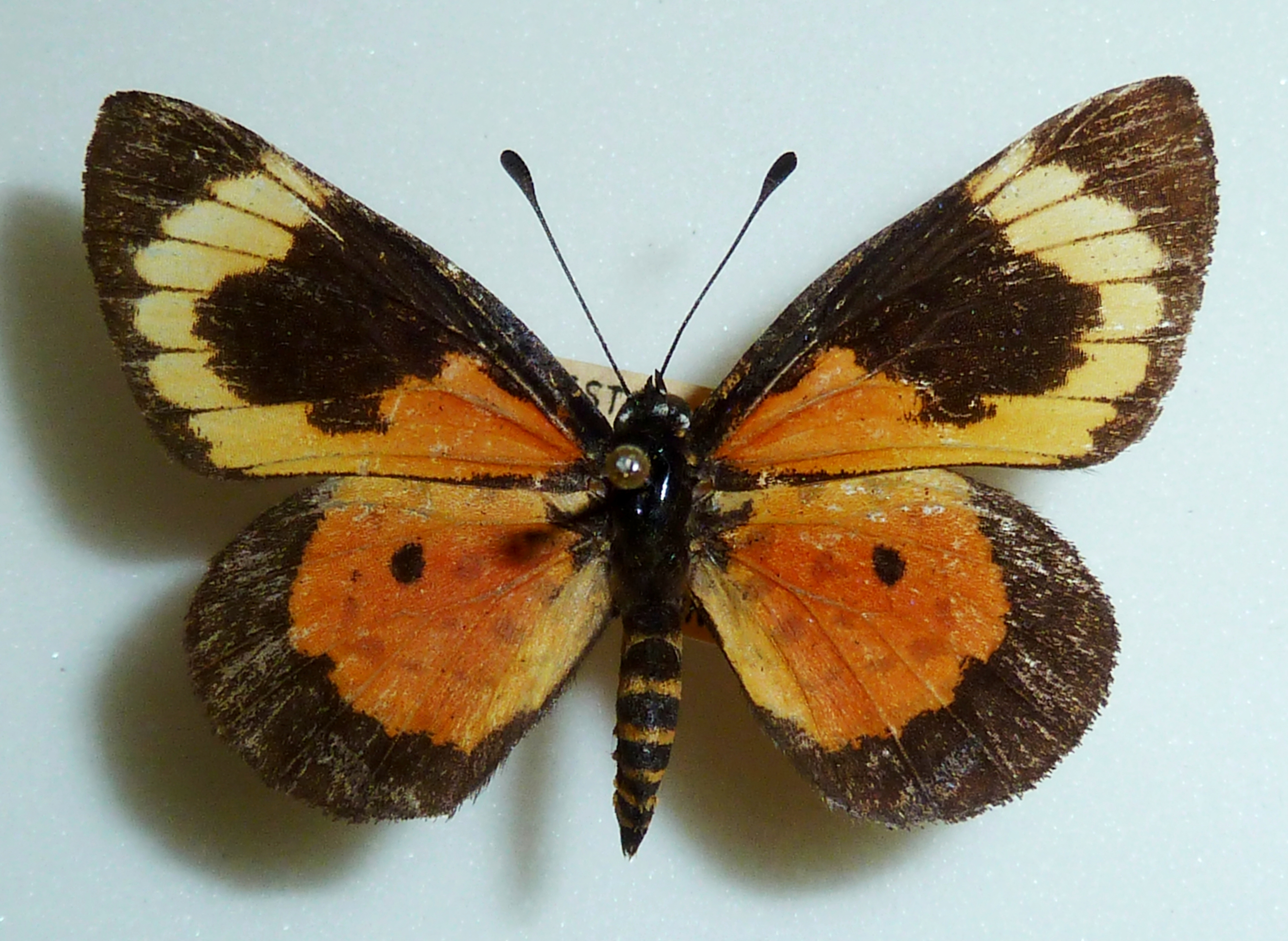
- Cooksonia neavei rhodesiae

Scientific classification
- Kingdom: Animalia
- Phylum: Arthropoda
- Class: Insecta
- Order: Lepidoptera
- Family: Lycaenidae
- Genus: Cooksonia
- Species: C. neavei

Binomial name
- Cooksonia neavei (H. H. Druce, 1912)

Synonyms
- Sheffieldia neavei H. H. Druce, 1912

= Cooksonia neavei =

Species of butterfly

Cooksonia neavei, or Neave's tiger mimic, is a butterfly in the family Lycaenidae. The species was first described by Hamilton Herbert Druce in 1912. It is found in Tanzania, Zambia and Zimbabwe. The habitat consists of Brachystegia woodland.

Adults resemble dead leaves. They are on wing from late October to mid-November.

The larvae feed on foliose lichens, probably Parmelia species that grow on tree trunks, as is the case with C. aliciae in Malawi.

== Subspecies ==
- Cooksonia neavei neavei (southern Tanzania)
- Cooksonia neavei rhodesiae Pinhey, 1962 (north-eastern Zimbabwe, Zambia)
