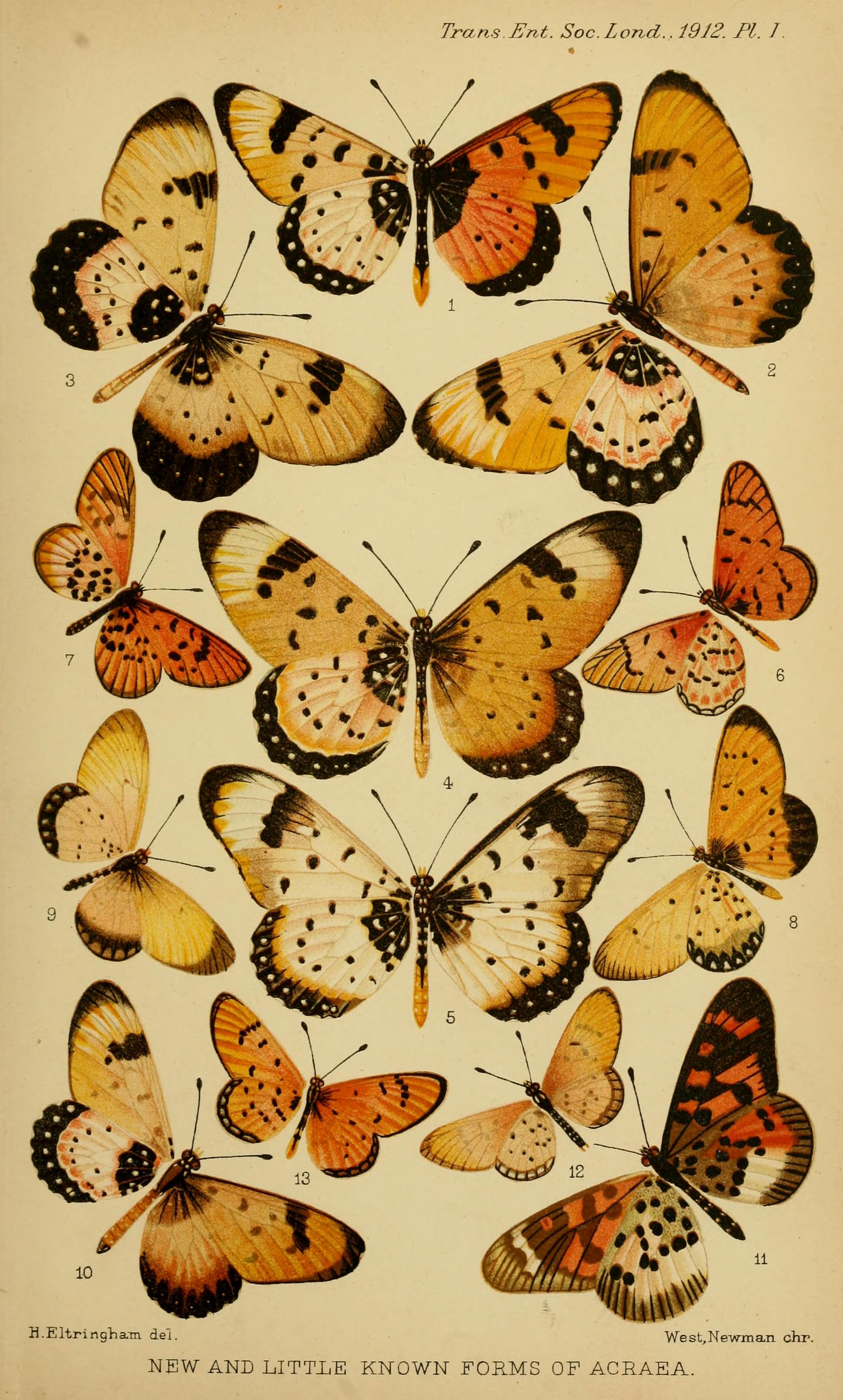
- Figure 6

Scientific classification
- Kingdom: Animalia
- Phylum: Arthropoda
- Class: Insecta
- Order: Lepidoptera
- Family: Nymphalidae
- Genus: Acraea
- Species: A. pseudatolmis

Binomial name
- Acraea pseudatolmis Eltringham, 1912

Synonyms
- Acraea nohara pseudatolmis Eltringham, 1912; Acraea (Acraea) pseudatolmis

= Acraea pseudatolmis =

Species of butterfly

Acraea pseudatolmis, the false scarlet acraea, is a butterfly in the family Nymphalidae. It is mostly found in eastern Zimbabwe.

== Description ==
Very similar to Acraea nohara qv. for differences.

== Biology ==
The habitat consists of montane grassland.

Adults are on wing year round.

The larvae feed on Basananthe sandersonii and Tricliceras longipedunculatum.

== Taxonomy ==
The species group is undetermined - but see also Pierre & Bernaud, 2014
