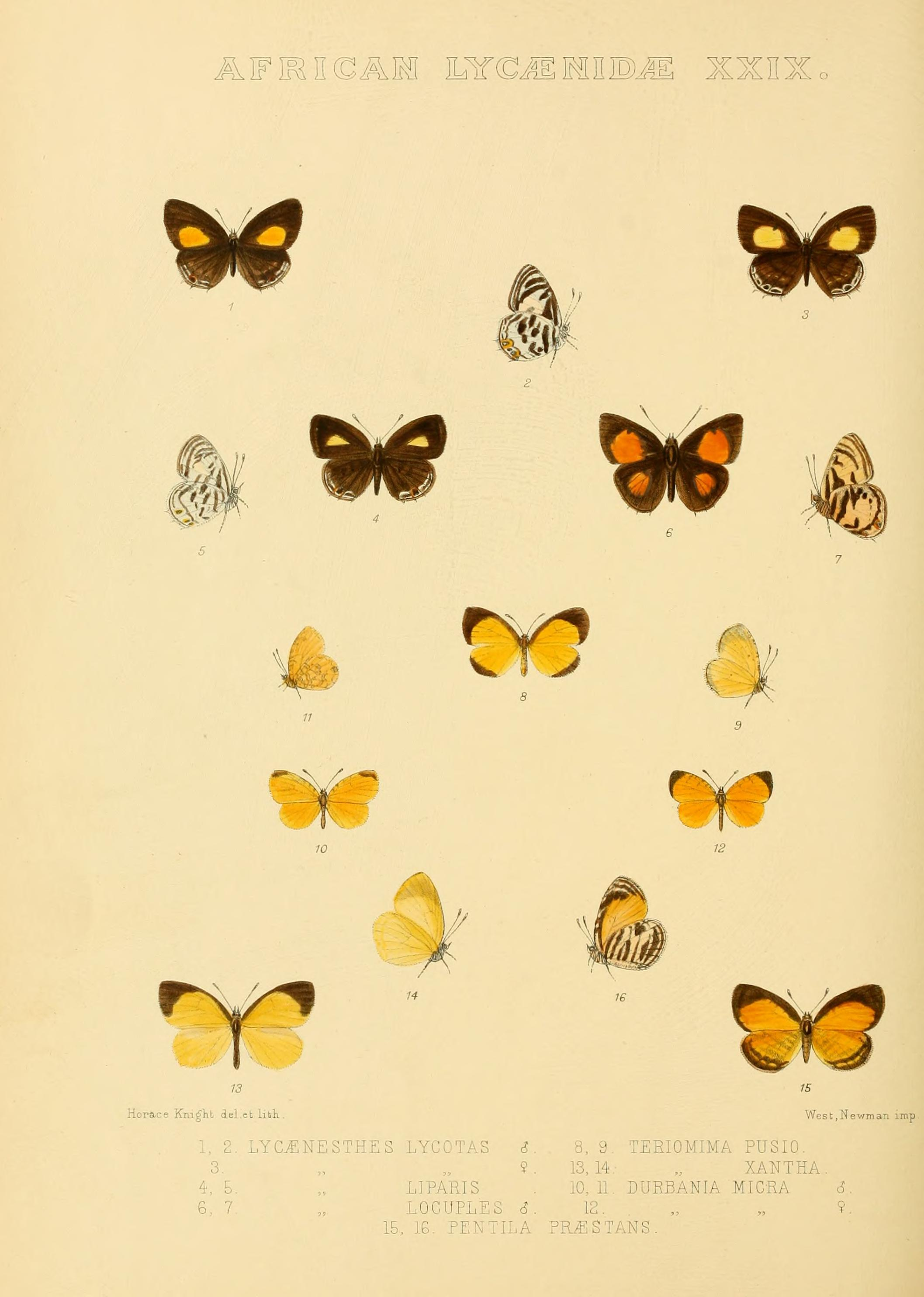
- Teriomima micra figures 10, 11 (male), 12 (female)

Scientific classification
- Domain: Eukaryota
- Kingdom: Animalia
- Phylum: Arthropoda
- Class: Insecta
- Order: Lepidoptera
- Family: Lycaenidae
- Subfamily: Poritiinae
- Genus: Teriomima; Kirby, 1887

= Teriomima =

Butterfly genus in family Lycaenidae

Teriomima is a genus of butterflies in the family Lycaenidae. Teriomima is endemic to the Afrotropics.

== Species ==
- Subgenus Teriomima
  - Teriomima puella Kirby, 1887
  - Teriomima puellaris Trimen, 1894
  - Teriomima subpunctata Kirby, 1887
  - Teriomima williami Henning & Henning, 2004
  - Teriomima zuluana van Son, 1949
- Subgenus Chrystina Henning & Henning, 2004
  - Teriomima micra (Grose-Smith, 1898)
  - Teriomima parva Hawker-Smith, 1933
