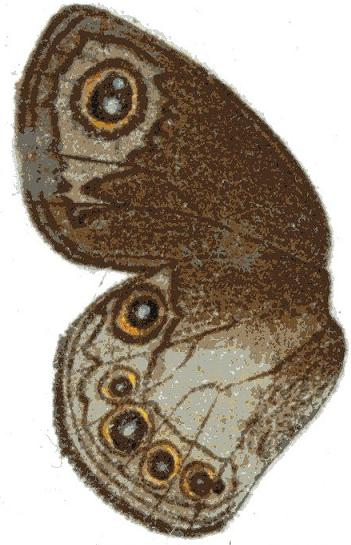
- Coenyropsis bera

Scientific classification
- Domain: Eukaryota
- Kingdom: Animalia
- Phylum: Arthropoda
- Class: Insecta
- Order: Lepidoptera
- Family: Nymphalidae
- Tribe: Satyrini
- Genus: Coenyropsis van Son, 1958

Type species
- Satyrus natalii Boisduval, 1847

Diversity
- Three species

= Coenyropsis =

Genus of butterflies

Coenyropsis is a genus of butterflies from the subfamily Satyrinae in the family Nymphalidae.

== Species ==
- Coenyropsis bera (Hewitson, 1877)
- Coenyropsis carcassoni Kielland, 1976
- Coenyropsis natalii (Boisduval, 1847)
