= Acraea dondoensis =

Scientific classification
- Kingdom: Animalia
- Phylum: Arthropoda
- Class: Insecta
- Order: Lepidoptera
- Family: Nymphalidae
- Genus: Acraea
- Species: A. dondoensis

Binomial name
- Acraea dondoensis Stevenson, 1934

Synonyms
- Acraea nohara dondoensis Stevenson, 1934; Acraea (Acraea) dondoensis; Acraea actiaca ab. junodi Oberthür, 1911; Acraea nohara junodi d’Abrera, 1980

Species of butterfly

Acraea dondoensis, the Dondo acraea, is a butterfly in the family Nymphalidae. It is found in Mozambique.

== Biology ==
Adults are on wing year round.

== Taxonomy ==
Subspecies of Acraea nohara
