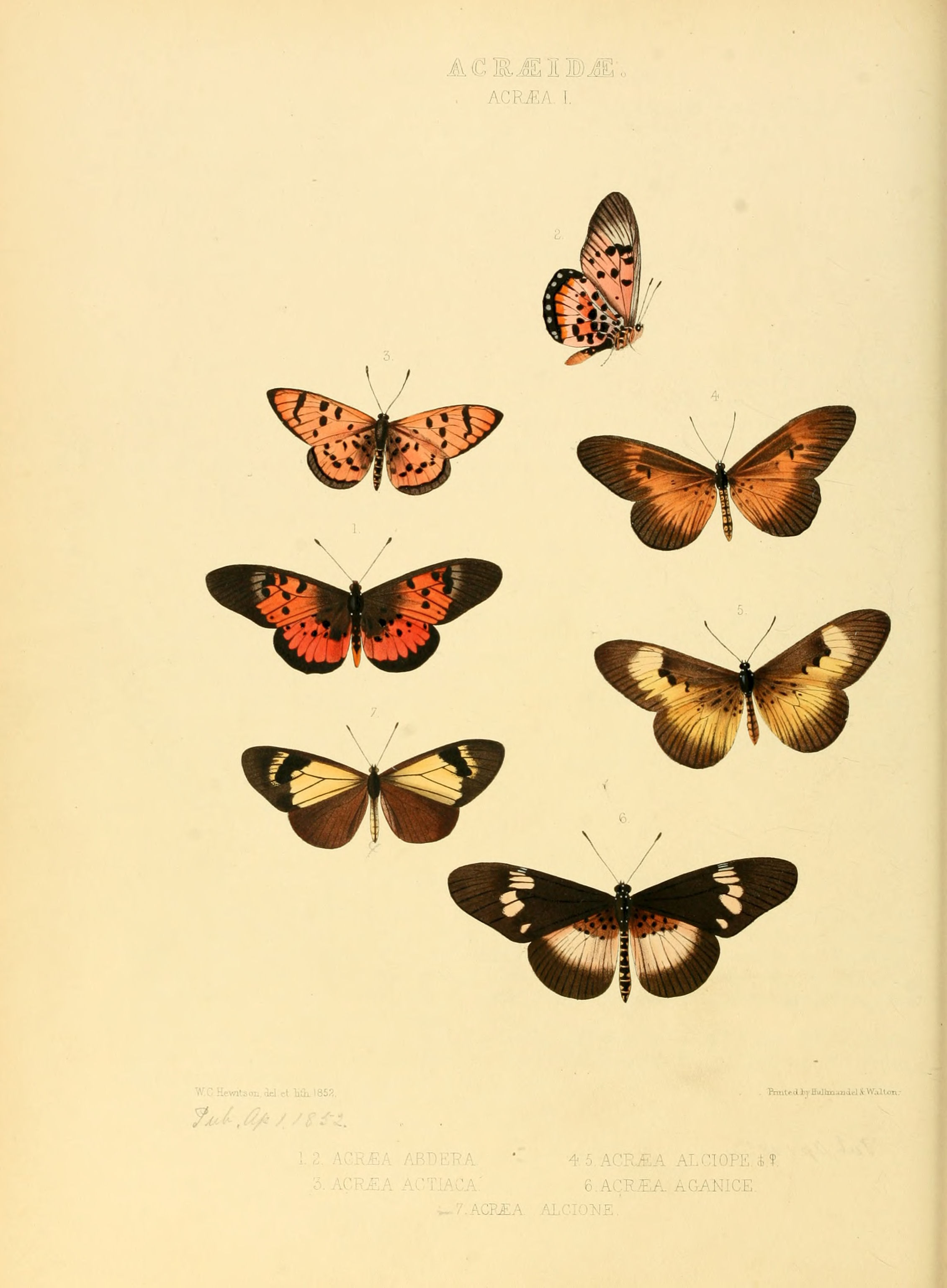
- Illustration (figure 1) in Hewitson's Illustrations of New Species of Exotic Butterflies

Scientific classification
- Kingdom: Animalia
- Phylum: Arthropoda
- Class: Insecta
- Order: Lepidoptera
- Family: Nymphalidae
- Genus: Acraea
- Species: A. nohara

Binomial name
- Acraea nohara Boisduval, 1847

Synonyms
- Acraea actiaca Hewitson, 1852; Acraea halali Marshall, 1896

= Acraea nohara =

Light red acraea

Species of butterfly

Acraea nohara, the light red acraea, is a butterfly of the family Nymphalidae. It is found from KwaZulu-Natal north through Zimbabwe to Kenya.

== Description ==
The wingspan is 40–48 mm (1.6–1.9 in) for males and 43–50 mm (1.7–2.0 in) for females. A. nohara Bdv. (55 c). Wings above light reddish with the usual black dots, which in aberratio form junodi Oberth. [ subspecies dondoensis Stevenson, 1934 ] are strongly but irregularly enlarged, and with black marginal band; marginal band of the forewing only 1 mm. in breadth, not widened at the apex, that of the hindwing. 1.5 to 2 mm. in breadth, not or indistinctly spotted; veins on the upperside of the forewing edged with black towards the distal margin; discal dots 3 to 6 or at least 4 to 6 placed in a straight line, vertically to the costal margin; fore wing with a basal dot in 1 b; of the discal dots on the hindwing those in cellules 2 and 4 are placed somewhat nearer to the base than the rest. The under surface is lighter, but otherwise scarcely differs except in the light yellow marginal spots of the hindwing. In the female the ground-colour varies from light reddish to yellowish grey. - Larva yellow with dark longitudinal lines and black spines; lives on Wormskjoldia longepedunculata. Pupa long and slender, whitish grey with black lines and yellow, black-margined spots on the abdomen. Natal, Transvaal, Zululand and Delagoa Bay halali Marsh, is smaller and has smaller discal dots, of which those in 1 b of the forewing and 3 and 5 of the hindwing are nearly always wanting; the marginal band of the fore wing is narrower than in the type-form. The female with grey-red to grey-yellow ground-colour. Mashonaland. -pseudatolmis Eltr. [now species Acraea pseudatolmis ] is as small as halali, which it closely resembles; the discal dots in cellules 3 and 5 of the hindwing and in 1 b of the forewing are, however, present and the dot in 4 of the forewing is narrow and transverse. Rhodesia. - punctellata Eltr.[now species Acraea punctellata ] differs from the type-form in its broader wings, the broader marginal band of the hindwing and in the discal dot in 4 of the forewing, which does not stand in a line with the dots in 5 and 6 but more distally. Except that the discal dot in cellule 3 of the hindwing is placed nearer to the base it agrees entirely with guillemei (55 c) and in my opinion belongs rather to this species than to nohara. Nyassaland; Angoniland; German East Africa: Kigonsera.

== Subspecies ==
- Acraea nohara nohara (Mozambique, Zimbabwe, Botswana, northern Namibia, Eswatini, South Africa: Limpopo, Mpumalanga, KwaZulu-Natal, Eastern Cape)
- Acraea nohara halali Marshall, 1896 (Zimbabwe: Mashonaland, Manicaland)
- Acraea nohara dondoensis Stevenson, 1934 (Mozambique)

== Biology ==
Adults are on wing from October to November and from January to March in southern Africa.

The larvae feed on Basananthe sandersonii and Tricicleras longipedunculatum.

== Taxonomy ==
It is a member of the Acraea cepheus species group. See also Pierre & Bernaud, 2014
