= Neocoenyra pinheyi =

Scientific classification
- Kingdom: Animalia
- Phylum: Arthropoda
- Class: Insecta
- Order: Lepidoptera
- Family: Nymphalidae
- Genus: Neocoenyra
- Species: N. pinheyi

Binomial name
- Neocoenyra pinheyi Carcasson, 1961

Species of butterfly

Neocoenyra pinheyi is a butterfly in the family Nymphalidae. It is found in northern and south-central Tanzania. The habitat consists of open thorn-bush country at altitudes between 1,200 and 1,600 meters.
