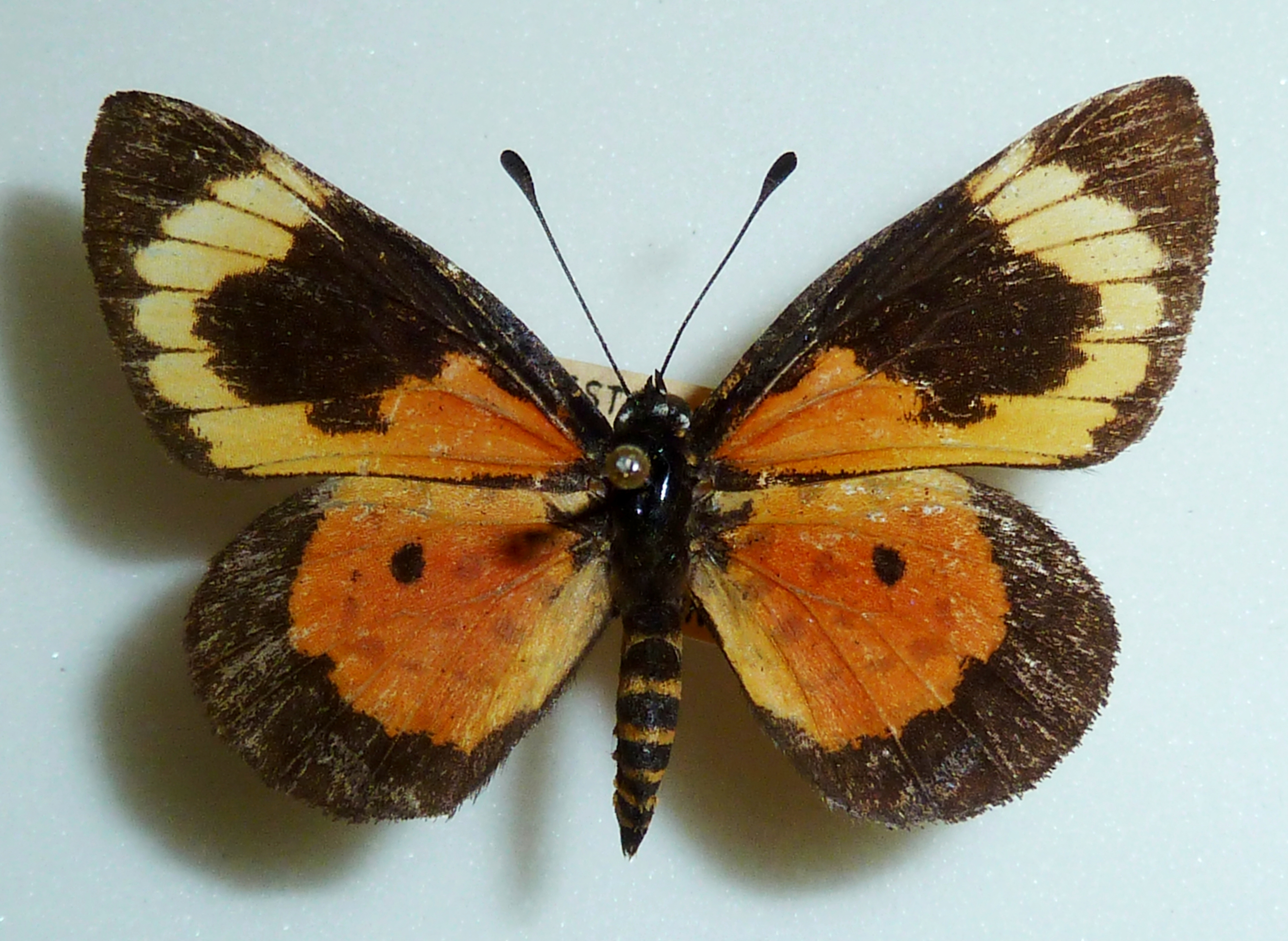
- Cooksonia neavei

Scientific classification
- Kingdom: Animalia
- Phylum: Arthropoda
- Class: Insecta
- Order: Lepidoptera
- Family: Lycaenidae
- Subfamily: Poritiinae
- Tribe: Liptenini
- Subtribe: Mimacraeina
- Genus: Cooksonia; H. H. Druce, 1905

Synonyms
- Sheffieldia H. H. Druce, 1912

= Cooksonia (butterfly) =

Butterfly genus in family Lycaenidae

Cooksonia is a genus of butterflies in the family Lycaenidae first described by Hamilton Herbert Druce in 1905. Cooksonia is endemic to the Afrotropical realm.

== Etymology ==
The genus name honours Harold Cookson (1876-1969), a farmer and amateur zoologist who lived in Muden, Natal, and later in the Vumba Mountains in what was then Rhodesia.

== Species ==
- Cooksonia abri Collins & Larsen, 2008
- Cooksonia aliciae Talbot, 1935
- Cooksonia ginettae Collins & Larsen, 2008
- Cooksonia neavei (H. H. Druce, 1912)
- Cooksonia trimeni H. H. Druce, 1905
