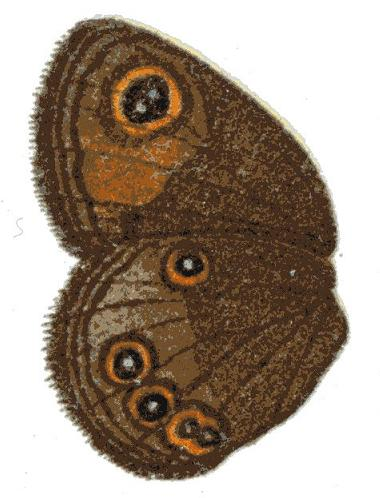
- Neocoenyra duplex

Scientific classification
- Domain: Eukaryota
- Kingdom: Animalia
- Phylum: Arthropoda
- Class: Insecta
- Order: Lepidoptera
- Family: Nymphalidae
- Tribe: Satyrini
- Genus: Neocoenyra; Butler, [1886]

Type species
- Neocoenyra duplex Butler, [1886]

Diversity
- 15 species

= Neocoenyra =

Genus of butterflies

Neocoenyra is a genus of Afrotropical butterflies from the subfamily Satyrinae in the family Nymphalidae.

== Species ==
- Neocoenyra bioculata Carcasson, 1964
- Neocoenyra cooksoni Druce, 1907
- Neocoenyra duplex Butler, [1886]
- Neocoenyra fuligo Kielland, 1990
- Neocoenyra fulleborni Thurau, 1903
- Neocoenyra gregorii Butler, 1894
- Neocoenyra heckmanni Thurau, 1903
- Neocoenyra jordani Rebel, 1906
- Neocoenyra kivuensis Seydel, 1929
- Neocoenyra masaica Carcasson, 1958
- Neocoenyra parallelopupillata (Karsch, 1897)
- Neocoenyra petersi Kielland, 1990
- Neocoenyra pinheyi Carcasson, 1961
- Neocoenyra rufilineata Butler, 1894
- Neocoenyra ypthimoides Butler, 1894
