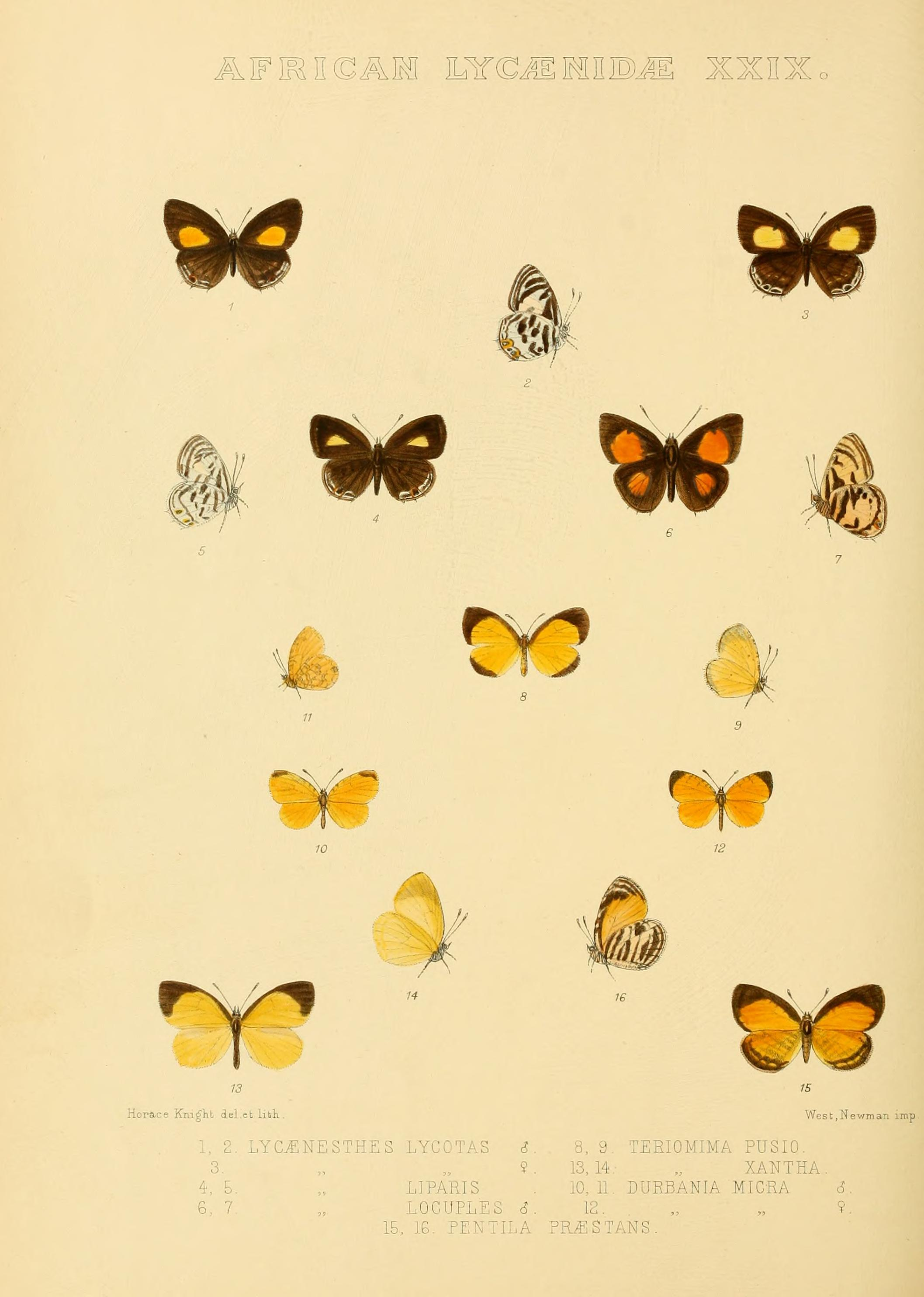
- Figures 10, 11 (male) and 12 (female)

Scientific classification
- Kingdom: Animalia
- Phylum: Arthropoda
- Class: Insecta
- Order: Lepidoptera
- Family: Lycaenidae
- Genus: Teriomima
- Species: T. micra

Binomial name
- Teriomima micra (Grose-Smith, 1898)

Synonyms
- Durbania micra Grose-Smith, 1898; Teriomima (Chrystina) micra

= Teriomima micra =

Species of butterfly

Teriomima micra, the minute buff, is a butterfly in the family Lycaenidae. It is found along the coast of Kenya and in Tanzania (from the coast to the northern part of the country). The habitat consists of coastal forests.

The larvae feed on tree lichens.
