= Cooksonia ginettae =

Scientific classification
- Kingdom: Animalia
- Phylum: Arthropoda
- Class: Insecta
- Order: Lepidoptera
- Family: Lycaenidae
- Genus: Cooksonia
- Species: C. ginettae

Binomial name
- Cooksonia ginettae Collins & Larsen, 2008

Species of butterfly

Cooksonia ginettae is a butterfly in the family Lycaenidae. It is found in the Democratic Republic of the Congo.
