= Coenyropsis carcassoni =

Scientific classification
- Kingdom: Animalia
- Phylum: Arthropoda
- Class: Insecta
- Order: Lepidoptera
- Family: Nymphalidae
- Genus: Coenyropsis
- Species: C. carcassoni

Binomial name
- Coenyropsis carcassoni Kielland, 1976

Species of butterfly

Coenyropsis carcassoni is a butterfly in the family Nymphalidae. It is found in south-eastern Kenya and eastern Tanzania. The habitat consists of Brachystegia woodland and savanna.
