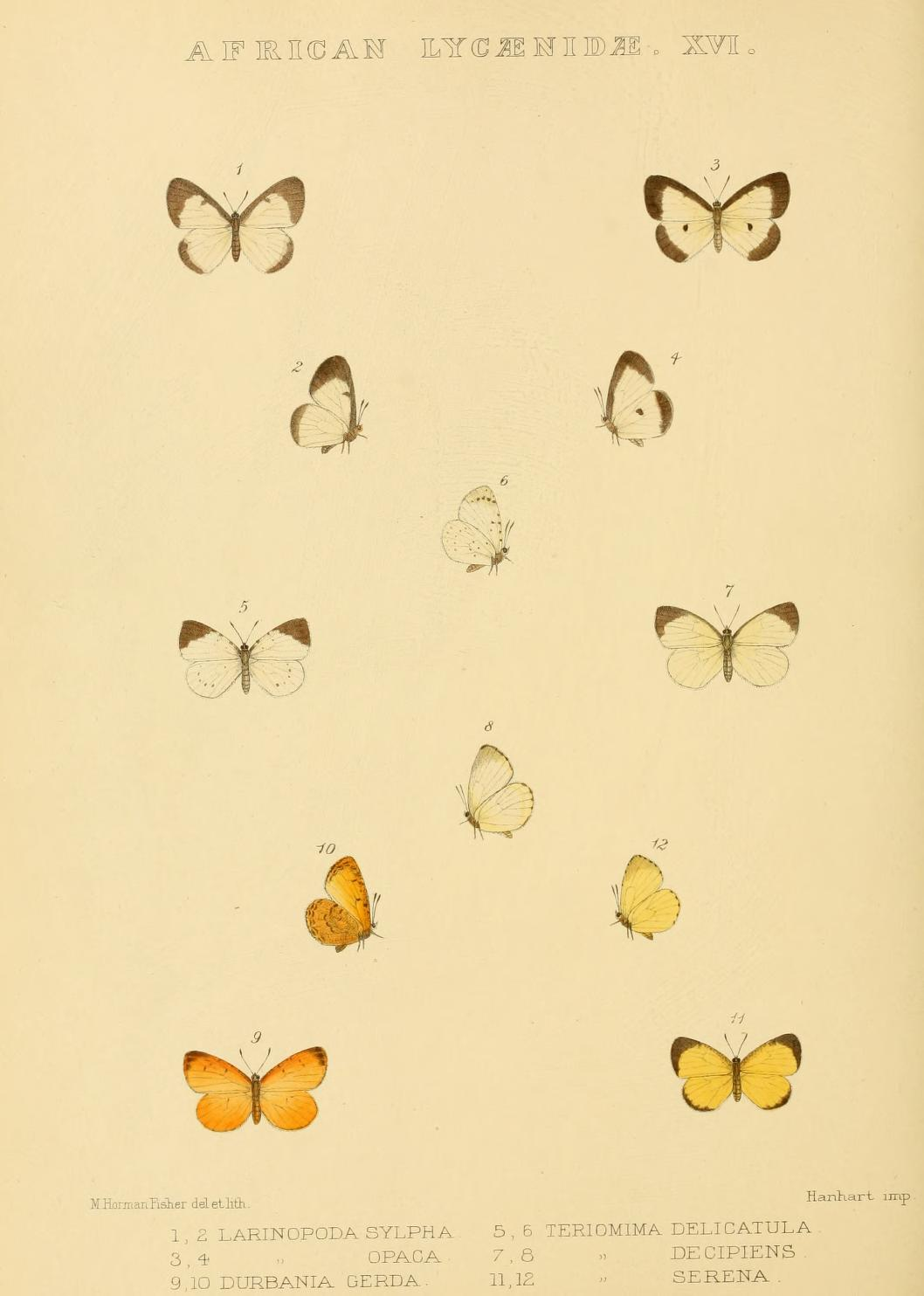

Scientific classification
- Kingdom: Animalia
- Phylum: Arthropoda
- Class: Insecta
- Order: Lepidoptera
- Family: Lycaenidae
- Genus: Teriomima
- Species: T. subpunctata

Binomial name
- Teriomima subpunctata Kirby, 1887

Synonyms
- Teriomima (Teriomima) subpunctata; Teriomima delicatula Kirby, 1890

= Teriomima subpunctata =

Species of butterfly

Teriomima subpunctata, the white buff, is a butterfly in the family Lycaenidae. It is found along the coast of Kenya and in Tanzania (from the coast inland to the Usambara and Uluguru districts). The habitat consists of coastal and lowland forests at altitudes ranging from sea level to 1,200 metres.

The larvae feed on tree lichens.
