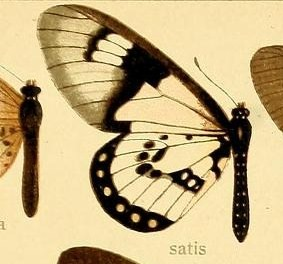
- In Adalbert Seitz's Die Gross-Schmetterlinge der Erde

Conservation status
- Least Concern (IUCN 3.1)

Scientific classification
- Kingdom: Animalia
- Phylum: Arthropoda
- Class: Insecta
- Order: Lepidoptera
- Family: Nymphalidae
- Genus: Acraea
- Species: A. satis

Binomial name
- Acraea satis Ward, 1871

Synonyms
- Acraea (Acraea) satis; Acraea corona Staudinger, 1885; Acraea satis f. donatis Woodhall, 2000

= Acraea satis =

East coast acraea

Species of butterfly

Acraea satis, the east coast acraea, is a butterfly of the family Nymphalidae. It is found in Zimbabwe, KwaZulu-Natal, Mozambique, Tanzania and Kenya.

== Description ==
A. satis Ward (54 a). Wings above in the male light red-yellow or brown-yellow, in the female white and very thinly scaled. Forewing at the costal margin narrowly black, at the distal margin broadly hyaline with some black scales; the base of cellules 4 to 6 is broadly yellow (male) or white and distally bounded by the (sometimes indistinct) discal dots of these cellules; the median spot at the end of the cell is very thick and forms with the streak-like discal dots of cellules 3 to 1 b a curved transverse band; beyond the middle of the cell a black transverse band, which is often joined to the median spot. Hindwing in cellules 1 b to 7 with strigiform, thick discal dots, which form with the outer basal dots of cellules 1 a to 1 c and the median spots an irregular transverse band enclosing light spots in cellules 1 a to 2 and 4 to 6; the black marginal band broad with large yellowish or white marginal spots. Rhodesia; Zululand; German and British East Africa. This very distinct species recalls A. rabbaiae and zonata in the markings and is grouped together with them by Eltringham The wingspan is 55–65 mm for males and 55–70 mm for females.

== Biology ==
Adults are on wing from September to April, with peaks in February and early March in southern Africa. There are several generations per year.

The larvae feed on Urera hypselodendron and Urera trinervis in eastern Africa.

== Taxonomy ==
It is a member of the Acraea satis species group- but see also Pierre & Bernaud, 2014
