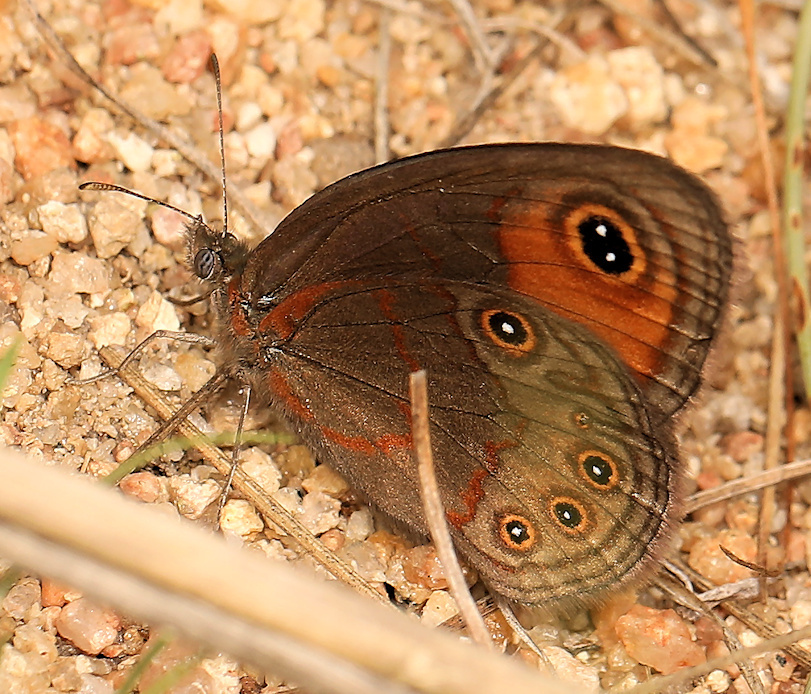

Scientific classification
- Kingdom: Animalia
- Phylum: Arthropoda
- Class: Insecta
- Order: Lepidoptera
- Family: Nymphalidae
- Genus: Coenyropsis
- Species: C. natalii

Binomial name
- Coenyropsis natalii (Boisduval, 1847)

Synonyms
- Satyrus natalii Boisduval, 1847; Pseudonympha schultzei Grünberg, 1910

= Coenyropsis natalii =

Natal brown

Species of butterfly

Coenyropsis natalii, the Natal brown, is a butterfly of the family Nymphalidae. It is found in South Africa.

The wingspan is 34–38 mm for males and 36–38 mm for females. Adults are on wing from late October to May (with a peak in mid-summer). There is a single extended generation per year.

The larvae probably feed on Poaceae grasses.

== Subspecies ==
- Coenyropsis natalii natalii (from the Kuruman hills in Northern Cape, north through North West and Gauteng to the area north of the Soutpansberg and south to the hills around Polokwane)
- Coenyropsis natalii poetulodes Vári, 1971 (Strydpoortberg and Waterberg in Limpopo)
