= Neocoenyra gregorii =

Scientific classification
- Domain: Eukaryota
- Kingdom: Animalia
- Phylum: Arthropoda
- Class: Insecta
- Order: Lepidoptera
- Family: Nymphalidae
- Genus: Neocoenyra
- Species: N. gregorii

Binomial name
- Neocoenyra gregorii Butler, 1894

Synonyms
- Ypthima chanleri Holland, 1896

Species of butterfly

Neocoenyra gregorii is a butterfly in the family Nymphalidae. It is found in Somalia, Kenya, Uganda, Tanzania, the eastern part of the Democratic Republic of the Congo and Malawi.
