= Neocoenyra fuligo =

Scientific classification
- Kingdom: Animalia
- Phylum: Arthropoda
- Class: Insecta
- Order: Lepidoptera
- Family: Nymphalidae
- Genus: Neocoenyra
- Species: N. fuligo

Binomial name
- Neocoenyra fuligo Kielland, 1990

Species of butterfly

Neocoenyra fuligo is a butterfly in the family Nymphalidae. It is found in central Tanzania. The habitat consists of montane grassland at altitudes between 2,000 and 2,100 meters.
