= Teriomima zuluana =

Scientific classification
- Kingdom: Animalia
- Phylum: Arthropoda
- Class: Insecta
- Order: Lepidoptera
- Family: Lycaenidae
- Genus: Teriomima
- Species: T. zuluana

Binomial name
- Teriomima zuluana van Son, 1949

Species of butterfly

Teriomima zuluana, the Zulu buff, is a butterfly of the family Lycaenidae. It is found in South Africa where it is rare and localised. It can be found in coastal lowland forests in northern KwaZulu-Natal from False Bay north to Kosi Bay and inland to the Makathini Flats and the Tembe Elephant Park.

The wingspan is 23–28 mm for males and 24–30 mm for females. Adults are on wing from October to November and again in late summer. There are two generations per year.

The larvae feed on tree lichens and algae (cyanobacteria).
