= Teriomima williami =

Scientific classification
- Kingdom: Animalia
- Phylum: Arthropoda
- Class: Insecta
- Order: Lepidoptera
- Family: Lycaenidae
- Genus: Teriomima
- Species: T. williami

Binomial name
- Teriomima williami Henning & Henning, 2004

Synonyms
- Teriomima (Teriomima) williami

Species of butterfly

Teriomima williami, the Dondo buff, is a butterfly in the family Lycaenidae. It is found in Mozambique. The habitat consists of coastal forests.

Adults have been recorded on wing in April, May, July, August and September
