= Neocoenyra masaica =

Scientific classification
- Domain: Eukaryota
- Kingdom: Animalia
- Phylum: Arthropoda
- Class: Insecta
- Order: Lepidoptera
- Family: Nymphalidae
- Genus: Neocoenyra
- Species: N. masaica

Binomial name
- Neocoenyra masaica Carcasson, 1958

Species of butterfly

Neocoenyra masaica is a butterfly in the family Nymphalidae. It is found in southern Kenya and northern Tanzania. The habitat consists of open thorn-bush woodland at altitudes of about 1,600 meters.
