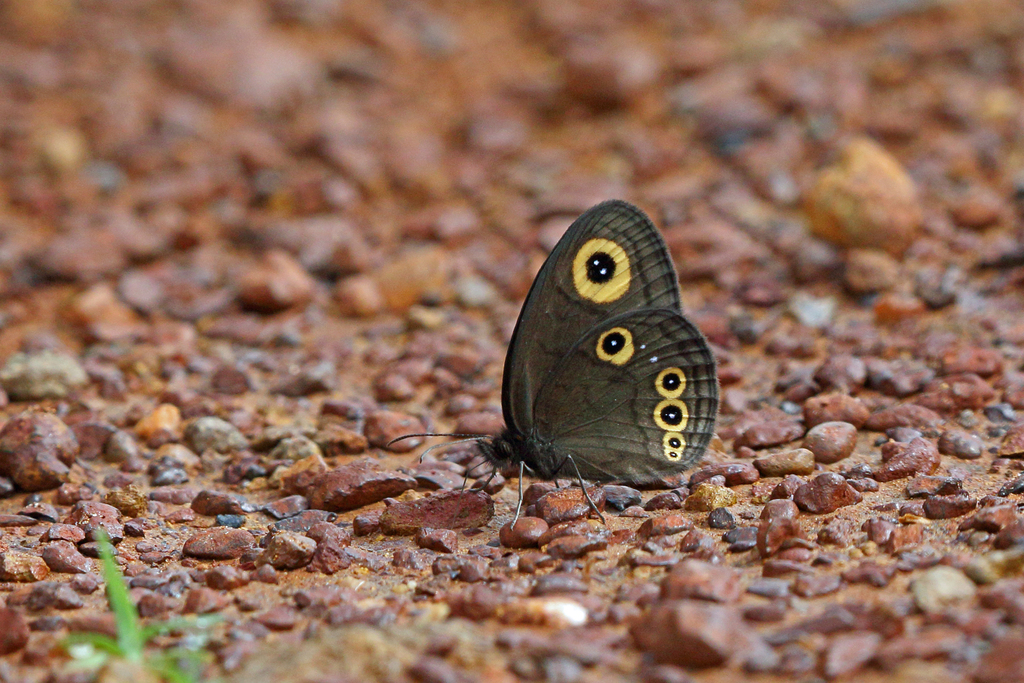

Scientific classification
- Kingdom: Animalia
- Phylum: Arthropoda
- Class: Insecta
- Order: Lepidoptera
- Family: Nymphalidae
- Genus: Neocoenyra
- Species: N. cooksoni

Binomial name
- Neocoenyra cooksoni H. Druce, 1907

= Neocoenyra cooksoni =

Species of butterfly

Neocoenyra cooksoni is a butterfly in the family Nymphalidae first described by Herbert Druce in 1907. It is found in the Democratic Republic of the Congo, northern Zambia, Angola and north-western Tanzania. The habitat consists of Brachystegia woodland.
