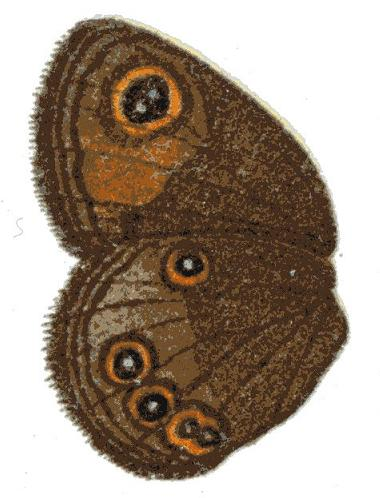

Scientific classification
- Kingdom: Animalia
- Phylum: Arthropoda
- Class: Insecta
- Order: Lepidoptera
- Family: Nymphalidae
- Genus: Neocoenyra
- Species: N. duplex

Binomial name
- Neocoenyra duplex Butler, 1886

= Neocoenyra duplex =

Species of butterfly

Neocoenyra duplex is a butterfly in the family Nymphalidae. It is found in southern Ethiopia, Somalia, Kenya, Uganda, Rwanda, the eastern part of the Democratic Republic of the Congo and northern Tanzania. The habitat consists of grassy savanna.

The larvae feed on Poaceae species.
