= Neocoenyra petersi =

Scientific classification
- Kingdom: Animalia
- Phylum: Arthropoda
- Class: Insecta
- Order: Lepidoptera
- Family: Nymphalidae
- Genus: Neocoenyra
- Species: N. petersi

Binomial name
- Neocoenyra petersi Kielland, 1990

Species of butterfly

Neocoenyra petersi is a butterfly in the family Nymphalidae. It is found in southern Tanzania. The habitat consists of montane grassland at altitudes between 2,550 and 2,800 meters.
