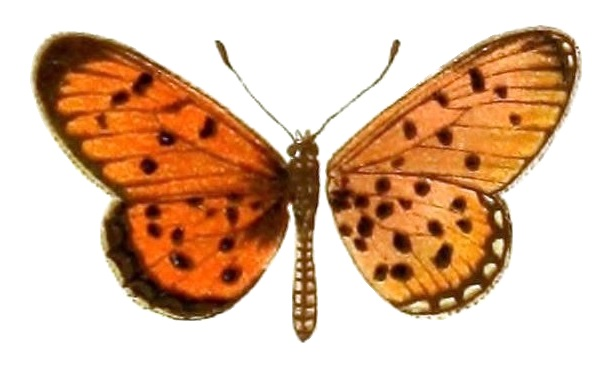
- A. guillemei in Seitz (1925)

Scientific classification
- Kingdom: Animalia
- Phylum: Arthropoda
- Class: Insecta
- Order: Lepidoptera
- Family: Nymphalidae
- Genus: Acraea
- Species: A. guillemei

Binomial name
- Acraea guillemei Oberthür, 1893

Synonyms
- Acraea (Acraea) guillemei

= Acraea guillemei =

Species of butterfly

Acraea guillemei is a butterfly in the family Nymphalidae which is native to deciduous woodlands in the southern subtropics of Africa.

== Range ==
It is found in Angola, the Democratic Republic of the Congo (Haut-Lomami, Tanganika), north-western Zambia and western Tanzania.

== Description ==
A. guillemei Oberth. (acutipennis Lathy) (55 c), as the figure shows, only differs from typical nohara in having the marginal band of the forewing somewhat widened at the apex, the marginal band of the hindwing broader, the discal dot in cellule 4 of the forewing not placed in a straight line with the dots in 5 and 6 and especially in having the discal dot in 3 of te hindwing placed midway between the marginal band and the base of the cellule. Angola and at Lake Tanganyika.

== Biology ==
The habitat consists of deciduous forests.

== Taxonomy ==
It is a member of the Acraea cepheus species group. See also Pierre & Bernaud, 2014
