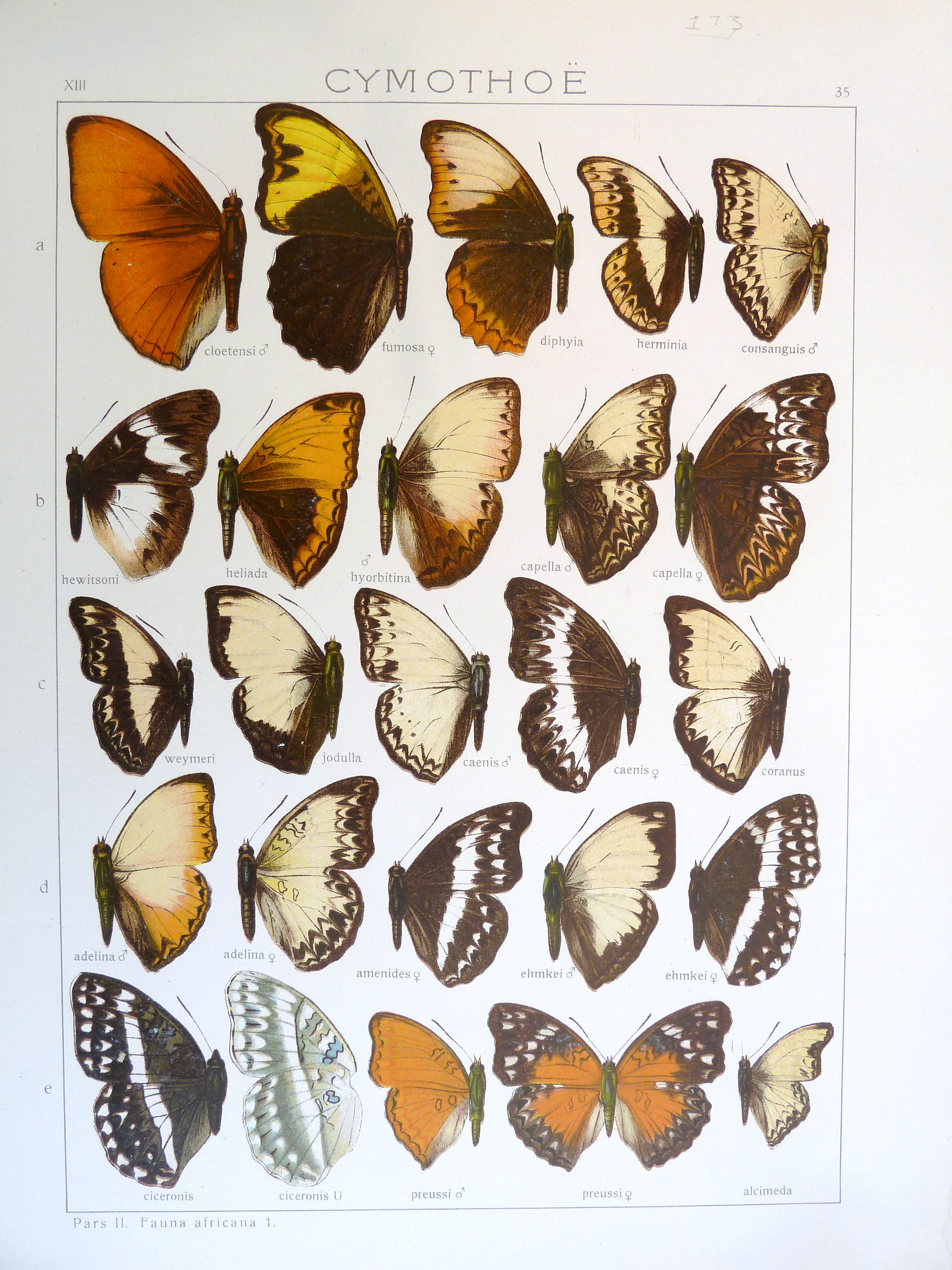
- In Adalbert Seitz's Fauna Africana

Scientific classification
- Kingdom: Animalia
- Phylum: Arthropoda
- Class: Insecta
- Order: Lepidoptera
- Family: Nymphalidae
- Genus: Cymothoe
- Species: C. coranus

Binomial name
- Cymothoe coranus (Grose-Smith, 1889)

Synonyms
- Harma coranus Grose-Smith, 1889

= Cymothoe coranus =

Species of butterfly

Cymothoe coranus, the blonde glider or coast glider, is a butterfly of the family Nymphalidae. It is found from South Africa to Zimbabwe, Kenya, Malawi and Tanzania.

The wingspan is 50–60 mm for males and 60–68 mm for females. Adults are on wing year round, but mainly from February to April. Peaks occur from October to December.

The larvae feed on Rawsonia lucida.

== Subspecies ==
- Cymothoe coranus coranus (coast of Kenya, eastern Tanzania, Mozambique, eastern Zimbabwe, Swaziland, South Africa: Mpumalanga, KwaZulu-Natal, Eastern Cape Province)
- Cymothoe coranus dowsetti Beaurain, 1988 (Malawi: west to Kasitu Rock)
- Cymothoe coranus kiellandi Beaurain, 1988 (western Tanzania)
- Cymothoe coranus murphyi Beaurain, 1988 (Malawi: Mount Mlanje)
