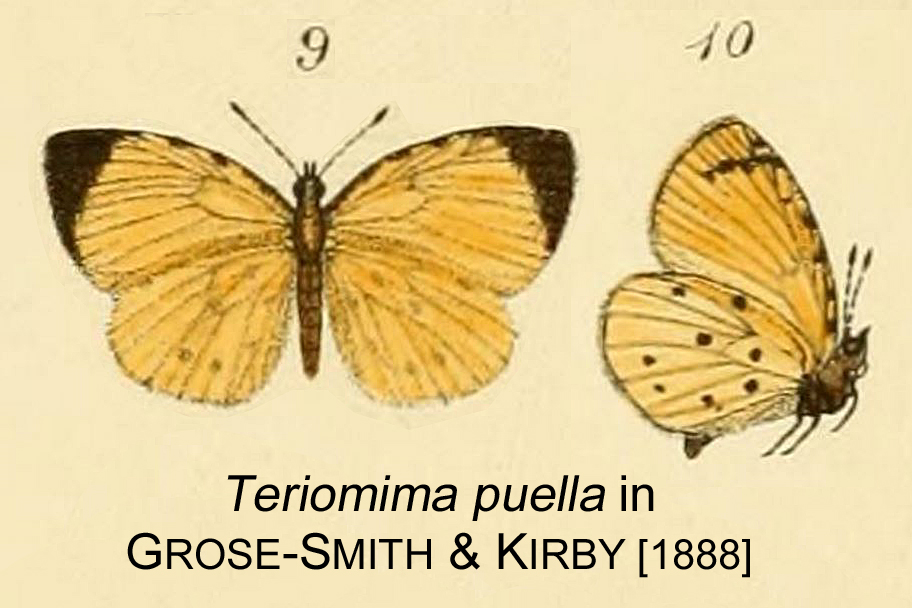

Scientific classification
- Kingdom: Animalia
- Phylum: Arthropoda
- Class: Insecta
- Order: Lepidoptera
- Family: Lycaenidae
- Genus: Teriomima
- Species: T. puella

Binomial name
- Teriomima puella Kirby, 1887

Synonyms
- Teriomima (Teriomima) puella

= Teriomima puella =

Species of butterfly

Teriomima puella, the sweetheart buff, is a butterfly in the family Lycaenidae. It is found in Tanzania (the south-east and from the north-east to Morogoro), Malawi, Zambia and Mozambique.

The larvae feed on tree algae (cyanobacteria) growing on trees.
