= Acraea acuta =

Scientific classification
- Kingdom: Animalia
- Phylum: Arthropoda
- Class: Insecta
- Order: Lepidoptera
- Family: Nymphalidae
- Genus: Acraea
- Species: A. acuta

Binomial name
- Acraea acuta Howarth, 1969

Synonyms
- Acraea ansorgei acuta Howarth, 1969; Acraea (Actinote) acuta; Acraea ansorgei acuta f. flava Howarth, 1969; Acraea ansorgei acuta f. alba Howarth, 1969; Acraea ansorgei acuta f. chrysippina Howarth, 1969; Acraea ansorgei acuta f. handmani Howarth, 1969; Acraea ansorgei acuta f. cottrelli Howarth, 1969; Acraea ansorgei acuta f. australis Howarth, 1969; Acraea ansorgei acuta f. reducta Howarth, 1969; Acraea ansorgei acuta f. radiata Howarth, 1969; Acraea ansorgei acuta f. rubrobasalis Howarth, 1969

Species of butterfly

Acraea acuta is a butterfly in the family Nymphalidae. It is found in Tanzania, Malawi and Zambia.

== Subspecies ==
- Acraea acuta acuta (Tanzania, Malawi, Zambia)
- Acraea acuta ngorongoro Kielland, 1990 (northern Tanzania)
- Acraea acuta nigromaculata Kielland, 1990 (north-eastern Tanzania)
- Acraea acuta rubrobasalis Kielland, 1990 (north-eastern Tanzania)

== Taxonomy ==
It is a member of the Acraea jodutta species group- but see also Pierre & Bernaud, 2014

== Biology ==
The habitat consists of montane forests and mountain summits with evergreen shrubs. The larvae probably feed on Urera species.
