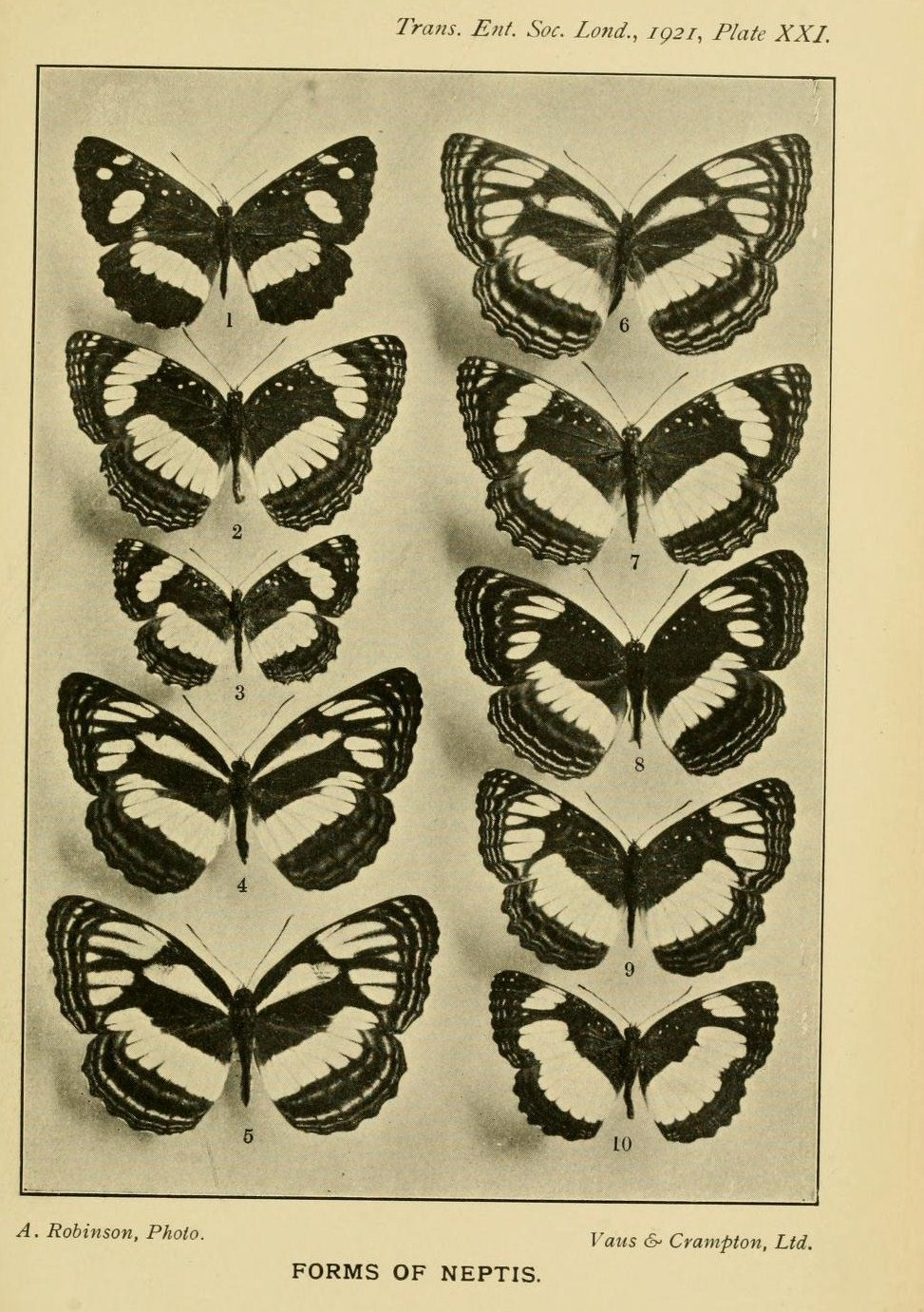
- Figure 1

Scientific classification
- Kingdom: Animalia
- Phylum: Arthropoda
- Class: Insecta
- Order: Lepidoptera
- Family: Nymphalidae
- Genus: Neptis
- Species: N. swynnertoni

Binomial name
- Neptis swynnertoni Trimen, 1912

Synonyms
- Neptis neavei Rothschild, 1918

= Neptis swynnertoni =

Species of butterfly

Neptis swynnertoni, or Swynnerton's sailer, is a butterfly in the family Nymphalidae. It is found in southern Malawi, west central Mozambique and eastern Zimbabwe. The habitat consists of montane forests.

Adults are on wing from September to May.

The larvae feed on Macaranga mellifera.
