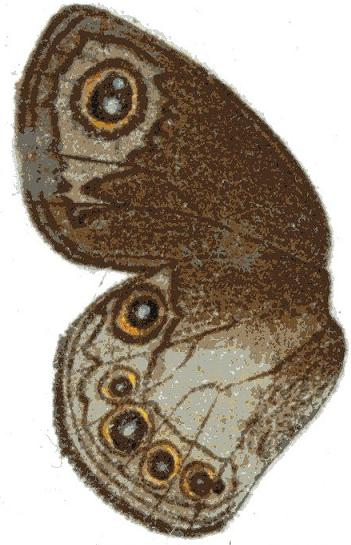

Scientific classification
- Domain: Eukaryota
- Kingdom: Animalia
- Phylum: Arthropoda
- Class: Insecta
- Order: Lepidoptera
- Family: Nymphalidae
- Genus: Coenyropsis
- Species: C. bera

Binomial name
- Coenyropsis bera (Hewitson, 1877)

Synonyms
- Ypthima bera Hewitson, 1877

= Coenyropsis bera =

Bera brown

Species of butterfly

Coenyropsis bera, the Bera brown, is a butterfly in the family Nymphalidae. It is found in southern Tanzania, Malawi, Zambia and northern Zimbabwe. The habitat consists of savanna, in areas with long grass on the lower slopes of hills.

Adults are on wing from November to December and from February to March, possibly in two generations per year.
