= Neocoenyra bioculata =

Scientific classification
- Domain: Eukaryota
- Kingdom: Animalia
- Phylum: Arthropoda
- Class: Insecta
- Order: Lepidoptera
- Family: Nymphalidae
- Genus: Neocoenyra
- Species: N. bioculata

Binomial name
- Neocoenyra bioculata Carcasson, 1964

Species of butterfly

Neocoenyra bioculata is a butterfly in the family Nymphalidae. It is found in Malawi.

== Subspecies ==
- Neocoenyra bioculata bioculata (Malawi: Tsenga Mountains)
- Neocoenyra bioculata murphyi Collins, 1997 (Malawi: Dzelanyama, Kasitu Rock)
