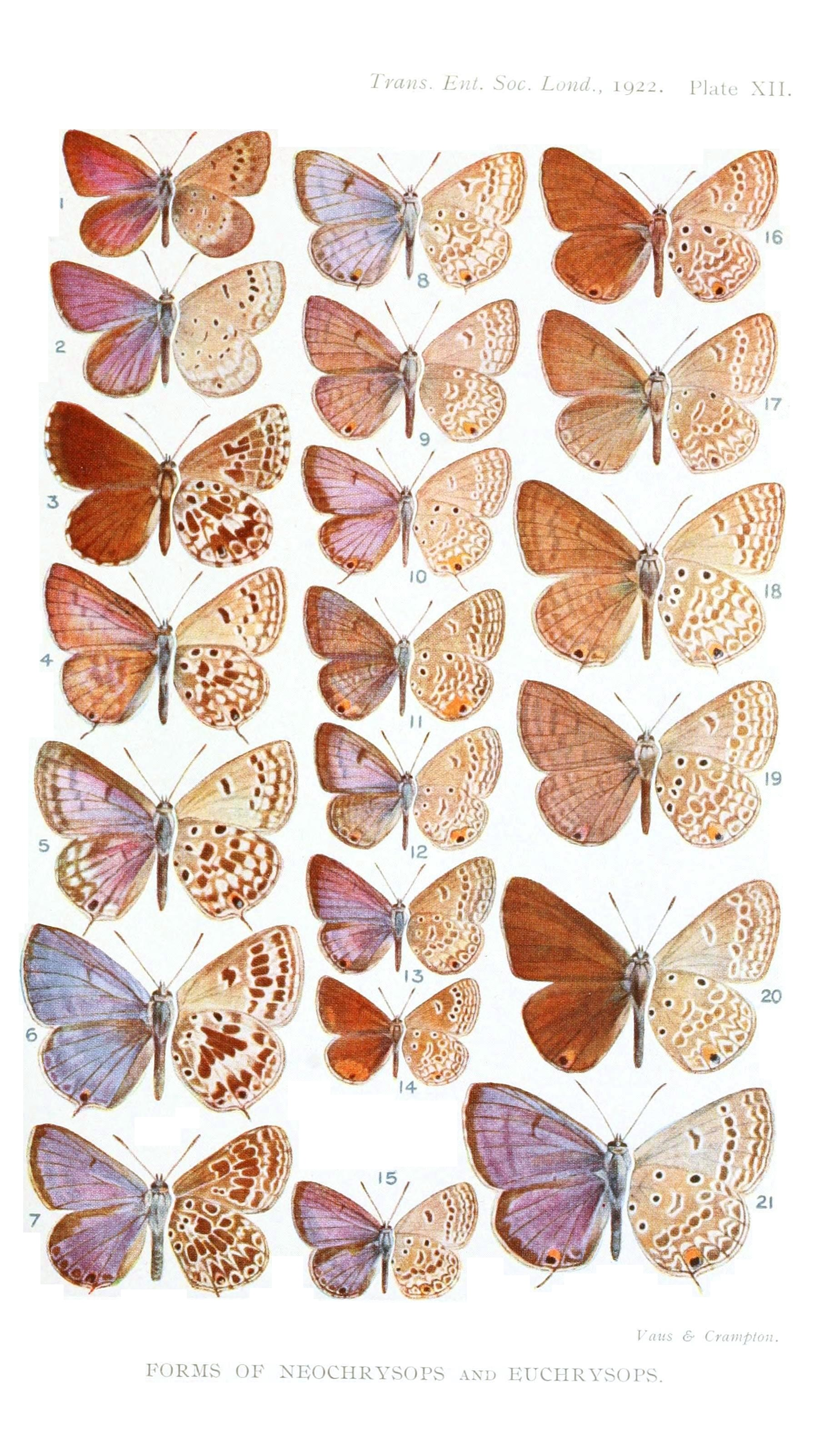
- Figures 4 (male) and 5 (female)

Scientific classification
- Kingdom: Animalia
- Phylum: Arthropoda
- Clade: Pancrustacea
- Class: Insecta
- Order: Lepidoptera
- Family: Lycaenidae
- Genus: Lepidochrysops
- Species: L. intermedia

Binomial name
- Lepidochrysops intermedia (Bethune-Baker, [1923])

Synonyms
- Neochrysops intermedia Bethune-Baker, [1923]

= Lepidochrysops intermedia =

Species of butterfly

Lepidochrysops intermedia is a butterfly in the family Lycaenidae. It is found in Tanzania, Zambia, Malawi and Mozambique. The habitat consists of Brachystegia woodland.

Adults have been recorded in November and December.

== Subspecies ==
- Lepidochrysops intermedia intermedia (Malawi, Mozambique)
- Lepidochrysops intermedia cottrelli Stempffer, 1954 (the border between Zambia and Malawi on the Nyika Plateau, Tanzania)
