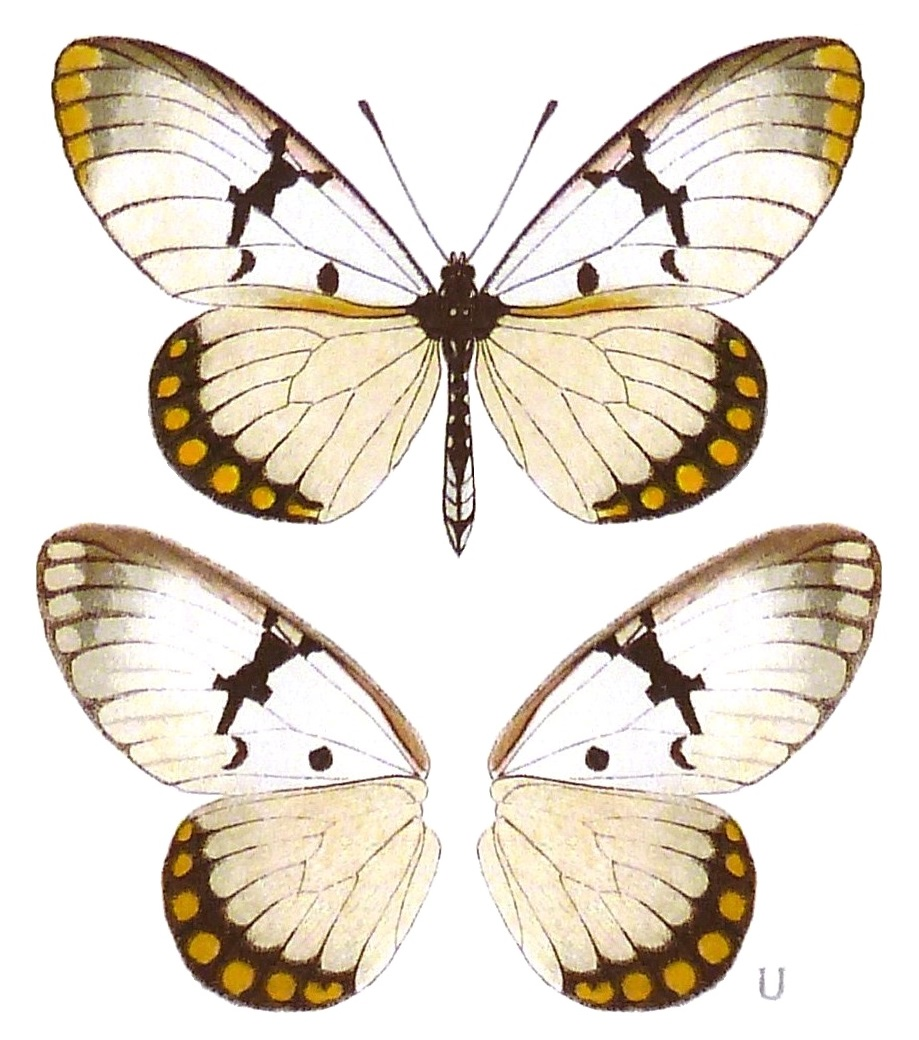
- In Seitz's Fauna Africana XIII, Taf. 53

Scientific classification
- Kingdom: Animalia
- Phylum: Arthropoda
- Class: Insecta
- Order: Lepidoptera
- Family: Nymphalidae
- Genus: Acraea
- Species: A. rabbaiae

Binomial name
- Acraea rabbaiae Ward, 1873

Synonyms
- Acraea (Acraea) rabbaiae; Acraea mombasae Grose-Smith, 1889

= Acraea rabbaiae =

Clear wing acraea

Species of butterfly

Acraea rabbaiae, the clear wing acraea, is a butterfly of the family Nymphalidae. It is found in KwaZulu-Natal, Eswatini, from Mozambique to Kenya and in Tanzania.

== Description ==
A. rabbaiae Ward (53 a). Fore wing diaphanous with a black basal dot in 1 b and with discal dots in (1 a) 1 b to 6, 10 and 11, which beneath are united with one another and with a spot in the apex of the cell, forming a black transverse band; the veins at the distal margin black and in cellules 4 to 7 bordering large but indistinct light yellowish marginal spots. Hindwing very thinly scaled, whitish, with black, light yellow- spotted marginal band 2 to 3 mm. in breadth and entirely without other markings. Delagoa Bay to British East Africa and Rhodesia. - mombasae Smith only differs in having the hindwing and partially also the forewing scaled with very light brown-yellow instead of white and the discal dots of the forewing smaller and often indistinct. German East Africa. The wingspan is 45–52 mm for males and 55–65 mm for females.

== Subspecies ==
- Acraea rabbaiae rabbaiae (coast of Kenya, coast of Tanzania, northern Mozambique)
- Acraea rabbaiae perlucida Henning & Henning, 1996 (Malawi, southern Mozambique, eastern Zimbabwe, Eswatini, South Africa: Mpumalanga, Gauteng, KwaZulu-Natal)

== Biology ==
Adults are on wing year-round, with peaks from September to June and from March to June.

The larvae feed on Tryphostemma zanzibaricum and Schlechterina mitostemmatoides.

== Taxonomy ==
It is a member of the Acraea satis species group - but see also Pierre & Bernaud, 2014
