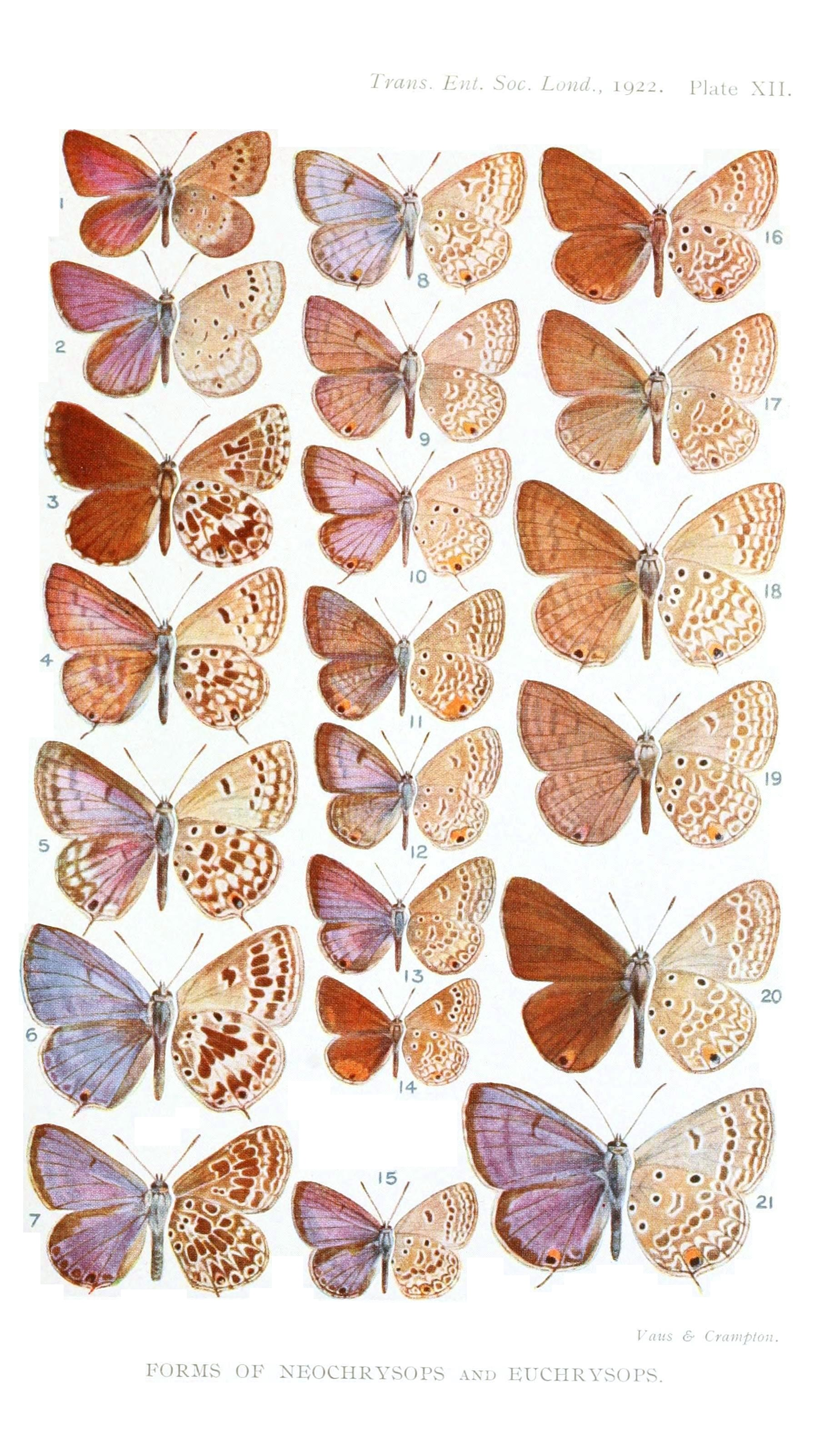
- Figure 9

Scientific classification
- Kingdom: Animalia
- Phylum: Arthropoda
- Class: Insecta
- Order: Lepidoptera
- Family: Lycaenidae
- Genus: Lepidochrysops
- Species: L. solwezii

Binomial name
- Lepidochrysops solwezii (Bethune-Baker, [1923])

Synonyms
- Neochrysops solwezii Bethune-Baker, [1923]; Neochysops nevillei Bethune-Baker, 1923

= Lepidochrysops solwezii =

Species of butterfly

Lepidochrysops solwezii, the roseate blue, is a butterfly in the family Lycaenidae. It is found in the Democratic Republic of the Congo (western Lualaba), Tanzania, Malawi, Zambia and eastern and south-western Zimbabwe. The habitat consists of Brachystegia woodland at altitudes between 900 and 1,700 meters.

Adults have been recorded on wing in November and December (in Zambia), November and December (in Tanzania) and October and November (in Zimbabwe).
