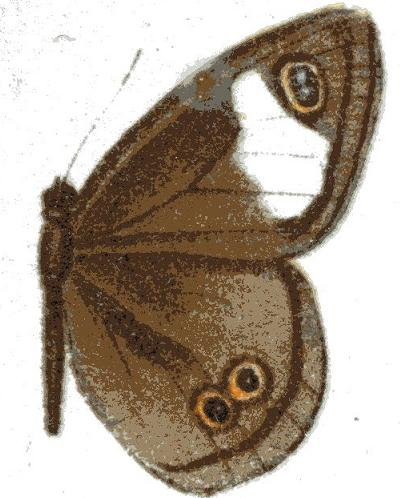

Scientific classification
- Kingdom: Animalia
- Phylum: Arthropoda
- Class: Insecta
- Order: Lepidoptera
- Family: Nymphalidae
- Genus: Neocoenyra
- Species: N. fulleborni

Binomial name
- Neocoenyra fulleborni Thurau, 1903

= Neocoenyra fulleborni =

Species of butterfly

Neocoenyra fulleborni is a butterfly in the family Nymphalidae. It is found in southern Tanzania. The habitat consists of submontane and montane grassland and shrubland at altitudes between 1,500 and 1,800 meters.

== Etymology ==
Named after Friedrich Fülleborn.
