= Neocoenyra kivuensis =

Scientific classification
- Domain: Eukaryota
- Kingdom: Animalia
- Phylum: Arthropoda
- Class: Insecta
- Order: Lepidoptera
- Family: Nymphalidae
- Genus: Neocoenyra
- Species: N. kivuensis

Binomial name
- Neocoenyra kivuensis Seydel, 1929

Species of butterfly

Neocoenyra kivuensis is a butterfly in the family Nymphalidae. It is found in the eastern part of the Democratic Republic of the Congo, Burundi, western Tanzania, Zambia and Malawi. The habitat consists of Brachystegia woodland, montane grassland on forest margins, at altitudes between 1,000 and 2,000 meters.
