= Neocoenyra ypthimoides =

Scientific classification
- Domain: Eukaryota
- Kingdom: Animalia
- Phylum: Arthropoda
- Class: Insecta
- Order: Lepidoptera
- Family: Nymphalidae
- Genus: Neocoenyra
- Species: N. ypthimoides

Binomial name
- Neocoenyra ypthimoides Butler, 1894

Synonyms
- Neocoenyra ypthimoides ab. superfluae Strand, 1911

Species of butterfly

Neocoenyra ypthimoides is a butterfly in the family Nymphalidae. It is found in the Democratic Republic of the Congo, Tanzania, Malawi and Zambia. The habitat consists of deciduous woodland and forest margins at altitudes between 500 and 1,800 meters.
