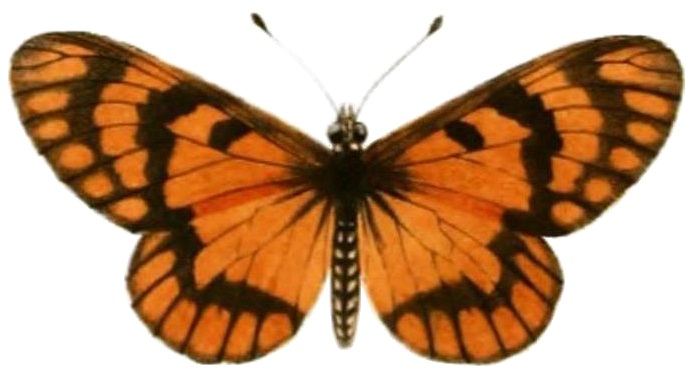

Scientific classification
- Kingdom: Animalia
- Phylum: Arthropoda
- Class: Insecta
- Order: Lepidoptera
- Family: Nymphalidae
- Genus: Acraea
- Species: A. zonata

Binomial name
- Acraea zonata Hewitson, 1877

Synonyms
- Acraea (Acraea) zonata; Acraea makupa Grose-Smith, 1889

= Acraea zonata =

Species of butterfly

Acraea zonata is a butterfly in the family Nymphalidae. It is found in Malawi, Tanzania and Kenya.

== Description ==
A. zonata Hew. (53 a). Wings brown-yellow with black veins and triangular black spots at the extremities of the veins; forewing with black costal margin, a large black spot in the celi, a discal and a submarginal curved transverse band, which are united at the hindmargin near the hinder angle; these transverse bands are continued on the hindwing by a single band which runs somewhat behind the middle. A rare species, hitherto only met with in German and British East Africa.

== Taxonomy ==
It is a member of the Acraea satis species group - but see also Pierre & Bernaud, 2014
