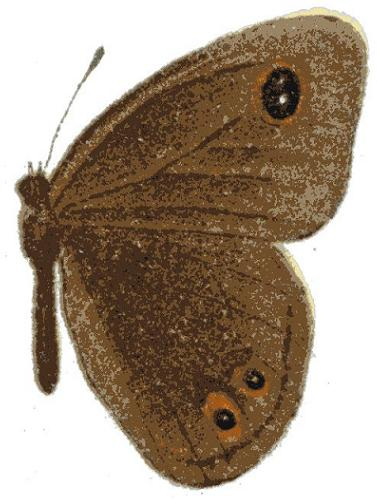

Scientific classification
- Domain: Eukaryota
- Kingdom: Animalia
- Phylum: Arthropoda
- Class: Insecta
- Order: Lepidoptera
- Family: Nymphalidae
- Genus: Neocoenyra
- Species: N. parallelopupillata

Binomial name
- Neocoenyra parallelopupillata (Karsch, 1897)

Synonyms
- Pseudonympha parallelopupillata Karsch, 1897

= Neocoenyra parallelopupillata =

Species of butterfly

Neocoenyra parallelopupillata is a butterfly in the family Nymphalidae. It is found in north-eastern Tanzania and possibly Malawi. The habitat consists of montane forests at altitudes of about 2,200 meters.

Note, some sources online have misspelling as "paralellopupillata"
