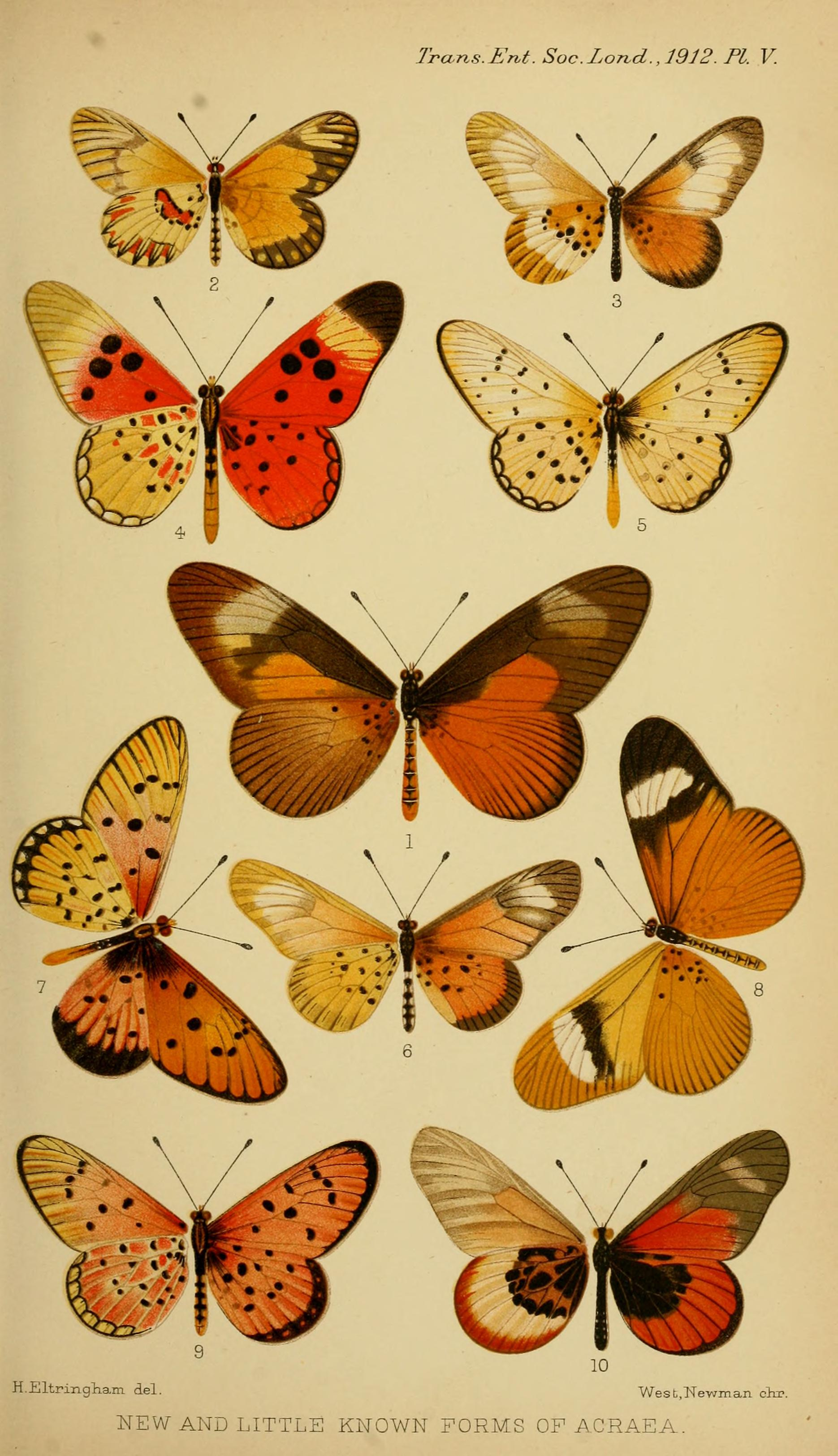
- Figure 9

Scientific classification
- Kingdom: Animalia
- Phylum: Arthropoda
- Class: Insecta
- Order: Lepidoptera
- Family: Nymphalidae
- Genus: Acraea
- Species: A. punctellata

Binomial name
- Acraea punctellata Eltringham, 1912

Synonyms
- Acraea nohara punctellata Eltringham, 1912; Acraea (Acraea) punctellata; Acraea nohara f. noharoides Le Doux, 1923

= Acraea punctellata =

Species of butterfly

Acraea punctellata is a butterfly in the family Nymphalidae. It is found in Malawi and southern Tanzania.

== Description ==
Very similar to Acraea nohara qv.

== Taxonomy ==
It is a member of the Acraea cepheus species group. See also Pierre & Bernaud, 2014.
