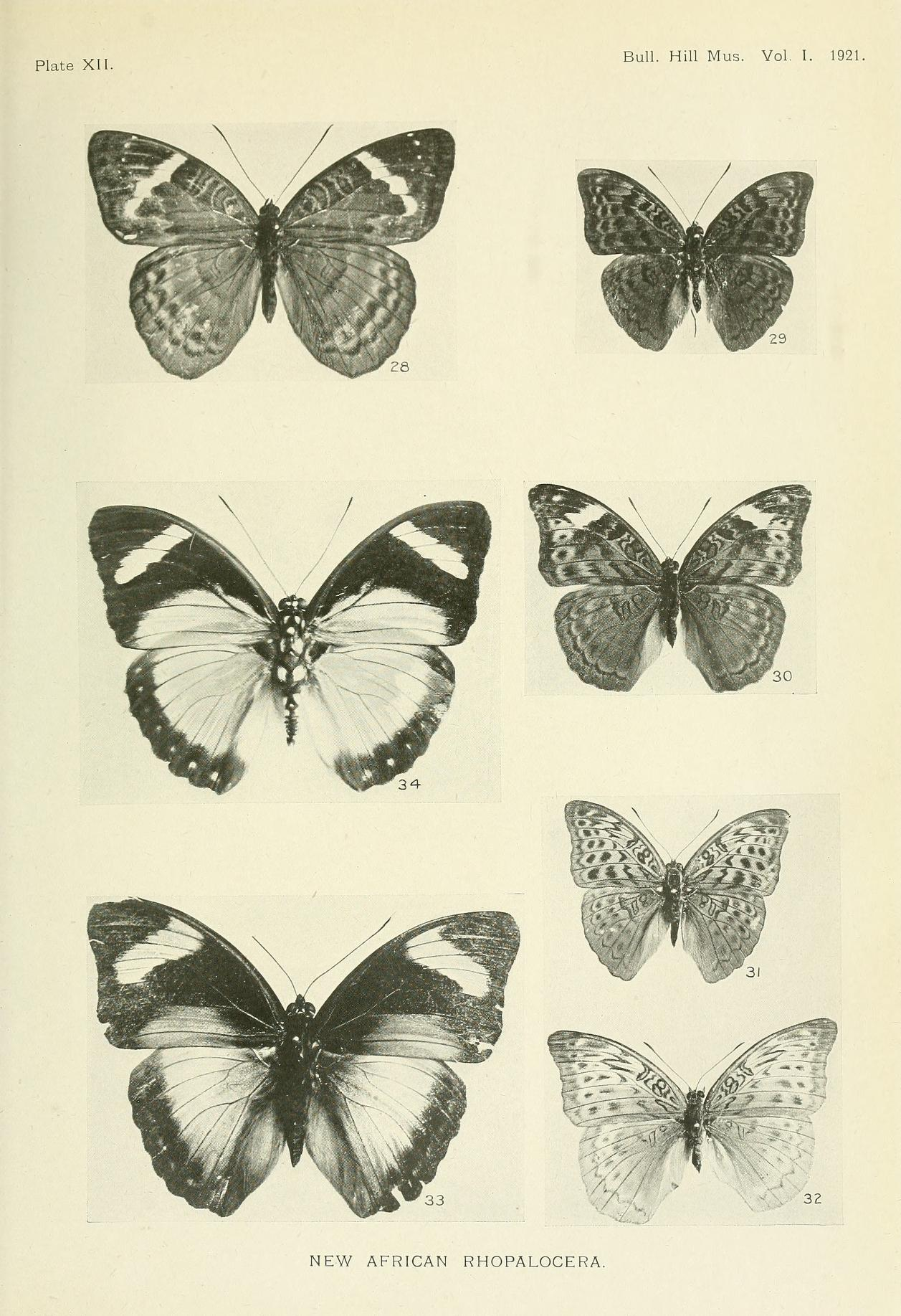
- Figure 34 (male) - plate accompanying the original description

Scientific classification
- Kingdom: Animalia
- Phylum: Arthropoda
- Class: Insecta
- Order: Lepidoptera
- Family: Nymphalidae
- Genus: Euphaedra
- Species: E. nigrobasalis

Binomial name
- Euphaedra nigrobasalis Joicey & Talbot, 1921

Synonyms
- Euphaedra eleus nigrobasalis Joicey & Talbot, 1921; Euphaedra (Euphaedrana) nigrobasalis; Euphaedra coprates upemba Overlaet, 1955

= Euphaedra nigrobasalis =

Species of butterfly

Euphaedra nigrobasalis is a butterfly in the family Nymphalidae. It is found in the Democratic Republic of the Congo, Zambia and Malawi. The habitat consists of primary forests.

== Original description ==
Euphaedra eleus nigrobasalis subsp. nov. Distinguished from eleus orientalis Roths. by the costa and upper part of cell being black to the base, leaving only a narrow stripe of red-brown along lower margin of cell, by the red-brown area only reaching origin of vein 3, by the narrow white subcostal stripe on hind wing below, and the absence of the submarginal row of spots. The distal margin of hind wing above is of more even width and not wider on the anal area; and the spots in it are blue without white tinge. Habitat.—Panda River, Lufira Valley, S.E. Congo, May 12, 1919, one male two females, T. A. Barns. Images of type-Tervuren

== Subspecies ==
- Euphaedra nigrobasalis nigrobasalis (Democratic Republic of the Congo, northern Zambia)
- Euphaedra nigrobasalis ceramica Hecq, 1991 (Malawi)
- Euphaedra nigrobasalis upemba Overlaet, 1955 (Democratic Republic of the Congo)
