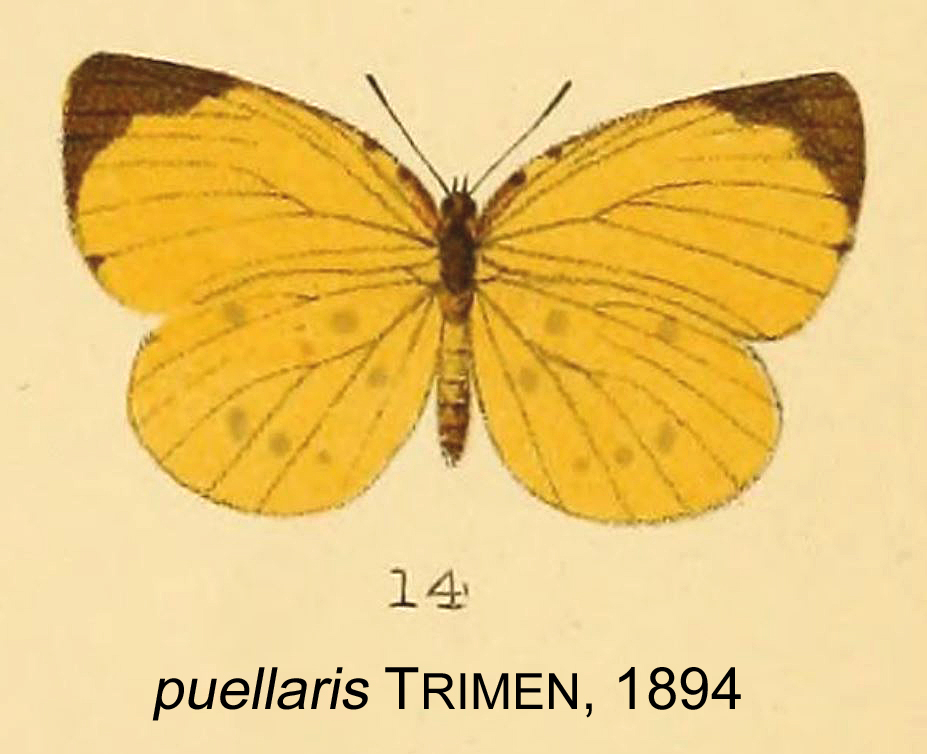
- plate figure accompanying the original description

Scientific classification
- Kingdom: Animalia
- Phylum: Arthropoda
- Class: Insecta
- Order: Lepidoptera
- Family: Lycaenidae
- Genus: Teriomima
- Species: T. puellaris

Binomial name
- Teriomima puellaris (Trimen, 1894)

Synonyms
- Durbania puellaris Trimen, 1894; Teriomima (Teriomima) puellaris

= Teriomima puellaris =

Species of butterfly

Teriomima puellaris, the two-dotted buff, is a butterfly in the family Lycaenidae. It is found in eastern Zimbabwe, western Mozambique, southern Malawi and southern Tanzania. The habitat consists of forests.

Adults are on wing from July to April.

The larvae feed on tree algae (cyanobacteria) growing on trees.
