= Lepidochrysops neavei =

Scientific classification
- Kingdom: Animalia
- Phylum: Arthropoda
- Class: Insecta
- Order: Lepidoptera
- Family: Lycaenidae
- Genus: Lepidochrysops
- Species: L. neavei

Binomial name
- Lepidochrysops neavei (Bethune-Baker, [1923])

Synonyms
- Neochrysops neavei Bethune-Baker, [1923]

Species of butterfly

Lepidochrysops neavei is a butterfly in the family Lycaenidae. It is found in Malawi and Mozambique. The habitat consists of mountainous areas and rocky ground with clumps of grass in Brachystegia woodland.

Adults have been recorded on wing in November, December and January.

== Subspecies ==
- Lepidochrysops neavei neavei (southern Malawi, Mozambique)
- Lepidochrysops neavei nolani Williams, 2002 (south-eastern Malawi)
