= Charaxes martini =

Scientific classification
- Domain: Eukaryota
- Kingdom: Animalia
- Phylum: Arthropoda
- Class: Insecta
- Order: Lepidoptera
- Family: Nymphalidae
- Genus: Charaxes
- Species: C. martini

Binomial name
- Charaxes martini van Someren, 1966

Species of butterfly

Charaxes martini is a butterfly in the family Nymphalidae. It is found in Malawi. The habitat consists of riparian forests.

The larvae feed on Diospyros natalensis natalensis.

== Taxonomy ==
Charaxes martini is a member of the large species group Charaxes etheocles.

== Subspecies ==
- Charaxes martini martini (Malawi: Mount Mlanje)
- Charaxes martini helenae Henning, 1982 (Malawi: west and north of the Zomba Plateau)
