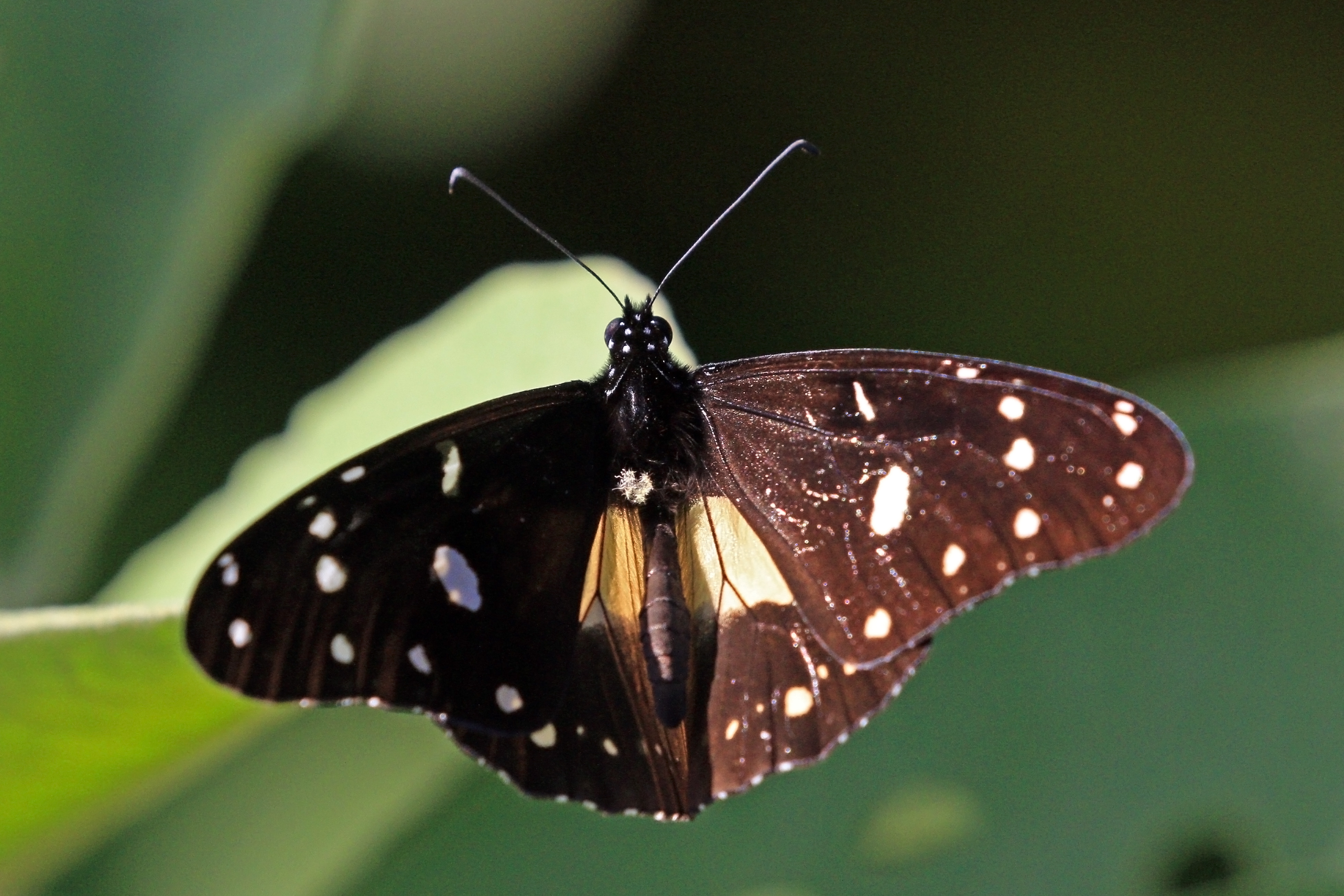

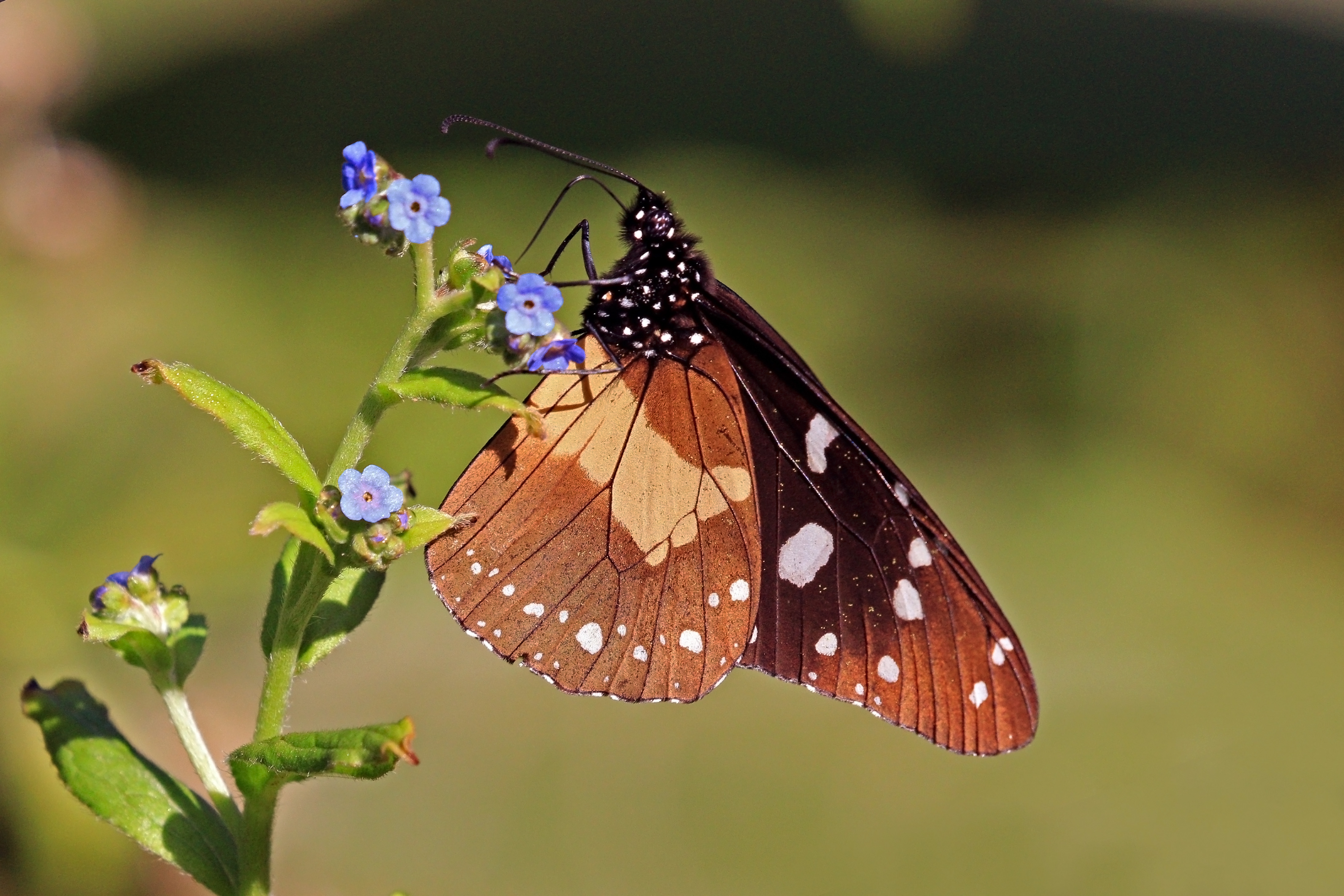
- Both in Kakamega Forest, Kenya

Scientific classification
- Kingdom: Animalia
- Phylum: Arthropoda
- Clade: Pancrustacea
- Class: Insecta
- Order: Lepidoptera
- Family: Nymphalidae
- Genus: Amauris
- Species: A. echeria

Binomial name
- Amauris echeria (Stoll, [1790])

Synonyms
- Papilio echeria Stoll, [1790]; Amauris echerioides Weistman, 1913; Amauris echeria imatongensis Talbot, 1941; Amauris echeria jacksoni f. luxuriosa Talbot, 1940; Amauris echeria vaal Talbot, 1940; Danais vaillantiana Godart, 1819; Amauris lobengula abessinica Schmidt, 1921; Amauris fernandina Schultze, 1914; Amauris jacksoni Sharpe, 1892; Amauris lobengula katangae Neave, 1910; Nebroda lobengula Sharpe, 1890; Amauris lobengula mongallensis Carpenter, 1928; Amauris lobengula septentrionis Poulton, 1924; Amauris steckeri Kheil, 1890; Amauris whytei Butler, 1894

= Amauris echeria =

Chief

Species of butterfly

Amauris echeria, the chief, is a butterfly of the family Nymphalidae. It is found in southern Africa.

The wingspan is 55–65 mm for males and 63–70 mm for females. Adults are on wing year round (with peaks in summer and autumn).

The larvae feed on Tylophora anomala, Tylophora stolzii, Cynanchum chirindense, Gymnema (including Gymnema sylvestre), Marsdenia (including Marsdenia angolensis and Marsdenia racemosa) and Secamone (including Secamone africana and Secamone parviflora).

== Subspecies ==
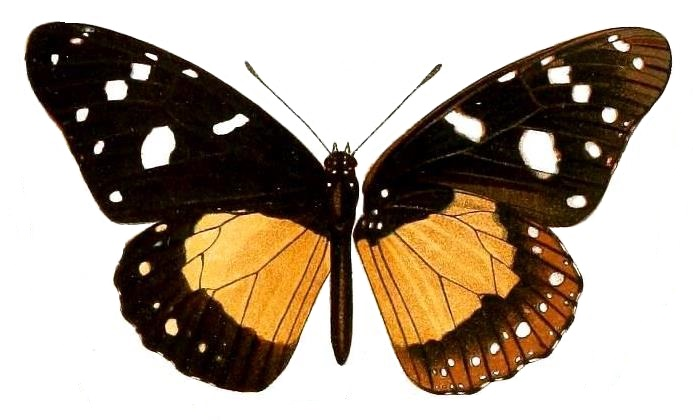
A. e. katangae Neave, 1910

- A. e. echeria – Cape to Natal, Zululand, Transvaal
- A. e. abessinica Schmidt, 1921 – Eritrea, northern Ethiopia
- A. e. chyuluensis van Someren, 1939 – south-eastern Kenya (Chyulu, Sagala, Emali, Teita)
- A. e. contracta Talbot, 1940 – western Kenya, Kitale
- A. e. fernandina Schultze, 1914 – Fernando Póo (Macías Nguema Island)
- A. e. jacksoni Sharpe, 1892 – Kenya west of the Rift Valley
- A. e. katangae Neave, 1910 – southern Zaire (southern Shaba), Zambia
- A. e. kikuyu Talbot, 1940 – eastern Kenya (Katamayu to Meru, Nyambeni)
- A. e. lobengula (Sharpe, 1890) – Rhodesia, southern Mozambique, southern Malawi (Mount Mlanje)
- A. e. meruensis Talbot, 1940 – northern Tanzania (Arusha, Moshi, Nogorongoro)
- A. e. mongallensis Carpenter, 1928 – southern Sudan, northern Uganda
- A. e. mpala Talbot, 1940 – highlands of Zaire
- A. e. occidentalis Schmidt, 1921 – Cameroon
- A. e. septentrionis Poulton, 1924 – northern Kenya (Marsabit, Nyiro, Kulal)
- A. e. serica Talbot, 1940 – southern Tanzania, northern Malawi
- A. e. steckeri Kheil, 1890 – southern Ethiopia, western Ethiopia, southern Sudan
- A. e. terrena Talbot, 1940 – western Uganda, eastern Zaire, north-western Tanzania, Rwanda, Burundi
- A. e. whytei Butler, 1894 – southern Malawi (Zomba Plateau)
