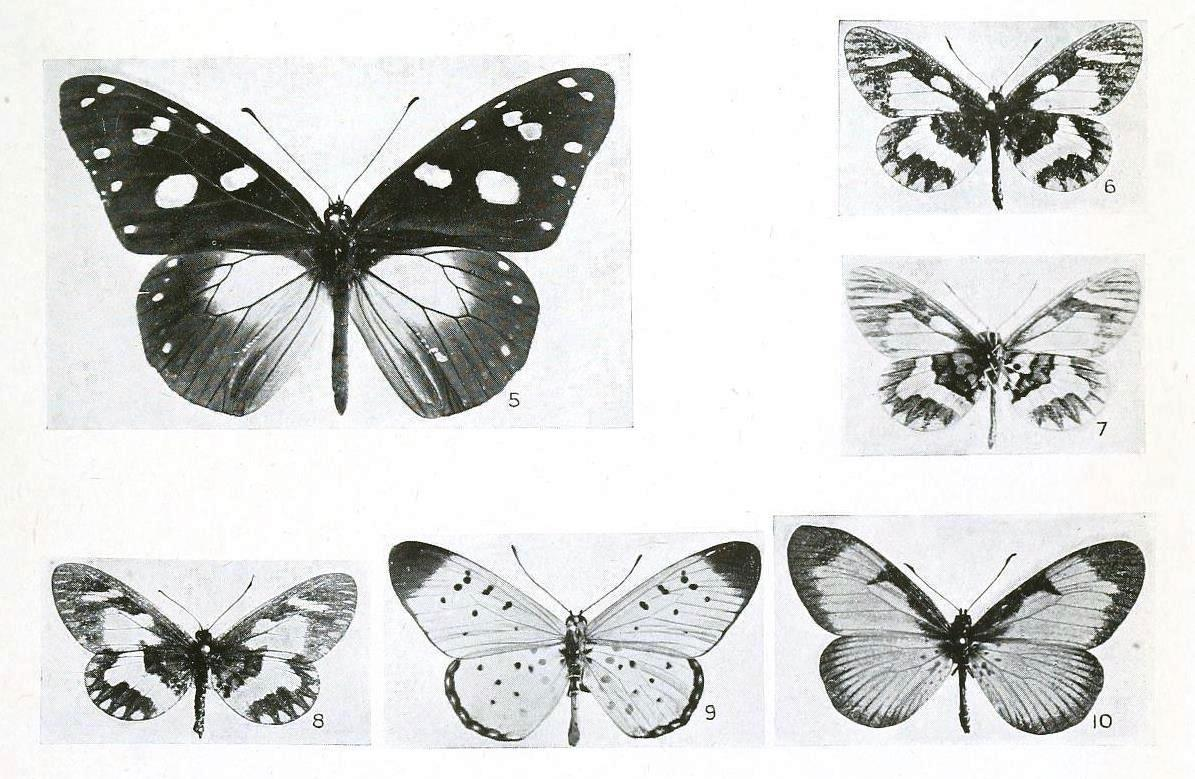
- Figure 5

Scientific classification
- Domain: Eukaryota
- Kingdom: Animalia
- Phylum: Arthropoda
- Class: Insecta
- Order: Lepidoptera
- Family: Nymphalidae
- Genus: Amauris
- Species: A. albimaculata

Binomial name
- Amauris albimaculata Butler, 1875

Synonyms
- Amauris echeria var. albimaculata Butler, 1875; Amauris egialea var. impar Aurivillius, 1922; Amauris albimaculata magnimacula f. semifascia Talbot, 1941; Amauris egialea similis Joicey & Talbot, 1921; Hirsutis virginalis Köhler, 1923; Amauris hanningtoni Butler, 1888; Amauris intermedians Hulstaert, 1926; Amauris albimaculata f. magnimacula Rebel, 1914

= Amauris albimaculata =

Layman

Species of butterfly

Amauris albimaculata, the layman, is a butterfly of the family Nymphalidae. It is found in southern Africa.

The wingspan is 50–60 mm for males and 62–68 for females. Adults are on the wing year-round (with peaks in summer and autumn).

The larvae feed on Tylophora anomala, T. stolzii, Cynanchum chirindense, C. vincetoxicum, Gymnema, Marsdenia (including M. angolensis and M. racemosa) and Secamone.

== Subspecies ==
- Amauris albimaculata albimaculata (South Africa, southern Mozambique)
- Amauris albimaculata chirindana Talbot, 1941 (western Mozambique, eastern Zimbabwe)
- Amauris albimaculata hanningtoni Butler, 1888 (southern Somalia, eastern Kenya, eastern Tanzania)
- Amauris albimaculata intermedians Hulstaert, 1926 (Cameroon)
- Amauris albimaculata interposita Talbot, 1940 (western Kenya, northern Tanzania)
- Amauris albimaculata latifascia Talbot, 1940 (Tanzania, Malawi, northern Zambia)
- Amauris albimaculata magnimacula Rebel, 1914 (Uganda, eastern Zaire, north-western Tanzania, Rwanda, Burundi)
- Amauris albimaculata sudanica Talbot, 1940 (Sudan, Ethiopia)
