= Cooksonia aliciae =

Scientific classification
- Kingdom: Animalia
- Phylum: Arthropoda
- Class: Insecta
- Order: Lepidoptera
- Family: Lycaenidae
- Genus: Cooksonia
- Species: C. aliciae

Binomial name
- Cooksonia aliciae Talbot, 1935

Species of butterfly

Cooksonia aliciae is a butterfly in the family Lycaenidae. It is found in Malawi.
