= List of butterflies of Eswatini =

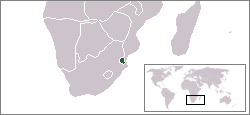
Location of Eswatini

This is a list of butterflies of Eswatini. About 312 species are known from Eswatini (formerly Swaziland), none of which are endemic.

== Papilionidae ==
=== Papilioninae ===
==== Papilionini ====
- Papilio nireus lyaeus Doubleday, 1845
- Papilio dardanus cenea Stoll, 1790
- Papilio constantinus Ward, 1871
- Papilio demodocus Esper, [1798]
- Papilio echerioides Trimen, 1868
- Papilio euphranor Trimen, 1868
- Papilio ophidicephalus ayresi van Son, 1939

==== Leptocercini ====
- Graphium antheus (Cramer, 1779)
- Graphium policenes (Cramer, 1775)
- Graphium colonna (Ward, 1873)
- Graphium porthaon (Hewitson, 1865)
- Graphium angolanus (Goeze, 1779)
- Graphium morania (Angas, 1849)
- Graphium leonidas (Fabricius, 1793)

== Pieridae ==
=== Coliadinae ===
- Eurema brigitta (Stoll, [1780])
- Eurema desjardinsii marshalli (Butler, 1898)
- Eurema hecabe solifera (Butler, 1875)
- Catopsilia florella (Fabricius, 1775)
- Colias electo (Linnaeus, 1763)

=== Pierinae ===
- Colotis amata calais (Cramer, 1775)
- Colotis antevippe gavisa (Wallengren, 1857)
- Colotis auxo (Lucas, 1852)
- Colotis celimene amina (Hewitson, 1866)
- Colotis danae annae (Wallengren, 1857)
- Colotis euippe omphale (Godart, 1819)
- Colotis evagore antigone (Boisduval, 1836)
- Colotis evenina (Wallengren, 1857)
- Colotis ione (Godart, 1819)
- Colotis pallene (Hopffer, 1855)
- Colotis regina (Trimen, 1863)
- Colotis vesta argillaceus (Butler, 1877)
- Colotis eris (Klug, 1829)
- Colotis subfasciatus (Swainson, 1833)
- Eronia cleodora Hübner, 1823
- Eronia leda (Boisduval, 1847)
- Pinacopterix eriphia (Godart, [1819])
- Nepheronia argia variegata Henning, 1994
- Nepheronia buquetii (Boisduval, 1836)
- Nepheronia thalassina sinalata (Suffert, 1904)
- Leptosia alcesta inalcesta Bernardi, 1959

==== Pierini ====
- Appias epaphia contracta (Butler, 1888)
- Appias sabina phoebe (Butler, 1901)
- Pontia helice (Linnaeus, 1764)
- Mylothris agathina (Cramer, 1779)
- Mylothris rueppellii haemus (Trimen, 1879)
- Dixeia charina (Boisduval, 1836)
- Dixeia pigea (Boisduval, 1836)
- Dixeia spilleri (Spiller, 1884)
- Belenois aurota (Fabricius, 1793)
- Belenois creona severina (Stoll, 1781)
- Belenois gidica abyssinica (Lucas, 1852)
- Belenois thysa (Hopffer, 1855)
- Belenois zochalia (Boisduval, 1836)

== Lycaenidae ==
=== Miletinae ===
==== Miletini ====
- Lachnocnema bibulus (Fabricius, 1793)
- Lachnocnema durbani Trimen & Bowker, 1887
- Thestor basutus (Wallengren, 1857)

=== Poritiinae ===
==== Liptenini ====
- Alaena amazoula amazoula (Boisduval, 1847)
- Alaena amazoula ochroma Vári, 1976
- Pentila tropicalis (Boisduval, 1847)
- Baliochila aslanga (Trimen, 1873)
- Cnodontes pallida (Trimen, 1898)
- Cnodontes penningtoni Bennett, 1954

==== Epitolini ====
- Durbania amakosa ayresi van Son, 1941
- Deloneura millari Trimen, 1906

=== Aphnaeinae ===
- Chloroselas mazoensis (Trimen, 1898)
- Chloroselas pseudozeritis (Trimen, 1873)
- Crudaria leroma (Wallengren, 1857)
- Chrysoritis aethon (Trimen & Bowker, 1887)
- Cigaritis ella (Hewitson, 1865)
- Cigaritis mozambica (Bertoloni, 1850)
- Cigaritis natalensis (Westwood, 1851)
- Cigaritis phanes (Trimen, 1873)
- Axiocerses tjoane (Wallengren, 1857)
- Axiocerses amanga (Westwood, 1881)
- Aloeides aranda (Wallengren, 1857)
- Aloeides henningi Tite & Dickson, 1973
- Aloeides swanepoeli Tite & Dickson, 1973
- Aloeides damarensis mashona Tite & Dickson, 1973
- Aloeides molomo (Trimen, 1870)
- Aloeides taikosama (Wallengren, 1857)
- Aloeides dryas Tite & Dickson, 1968
- Aphnaeus hutchinsonii Trimen & Bowker, 1887

=== Theclinae ===
- Myrina dermaptera (Wallengren, 1857)
- Myrina silenus ficedula Trimen, 1879
- Hypolycaena philippus (Fabricius, 1793)
- Hemiolaus caeculus (Hopffer, 1855)
- Leptomyrina hirundo (Wallengren, 1857)
- Leptomyrina gorgias (Stoll, 1790)
- Leptomyrina henningi Dickson, 1976
- Iolaus alienus Trimen, 1898
- Iolaus mimosae rhodosense (Stempffer & Bennett, 1959)
- Iolaus sidus Trimen, 1864
- Iolaus pallene (Wallengren, 1857)
- Iolaus trimeni Wallengren, 1875
- Iolaus silarus Druce, 1885
- Stugeta bowkeri tearei Dickson, 1980
- Deudorix antalus (Hopffer, 1855)
- Deudorix dinochares Grose-Smith, 1887
- Deudorix diocles Hewitson, 1869
- Deudorix penningtoni van Son, 1949
- Deudorix vansoni Pennington, 1948
- Capys alphaeus extentus Quickelberge, 1979
- Capys disjunctus Trimen, 1895

=== Polyommatinae ===
==== Lycaenesthini ====
- Anthene amarah (Guérin-Méneville, 1849)
- Anthene butleri livida (Trimen, 1881)
- Anthene definita (Butler, 1899)
- Anthene kersteni (Gerstaecker, 1871)
- Anthene liodes (Hewitson, 1874)
- Anthene millari (Trimen, 1893)
- Anthene minima (Trimen, 1893)
- Anthene otacilia (Trimen, 1868)
- Anthene princeps (Butler, 1876)
- Anthene talboti Stempffer, 1936

==== Polyommatini ====
- Cupidopsis cissus (Godart, [1824])
- Cupidopsis jobates (Hopffer, 1855)
- Pseudonacaduba sichela (Wallengren, 1857)
- Lampides boeticus (Linnaeus, 1767)
- Uranothauma nubifer (Trimen, 1895)
- Cacyreus lingeus (Stoll, 1782)
- Cacyreus marshalli Butler, 1898
- Cacyreus tespis (Herbst, 1804)
- Cacyreus virilis Stempffer, 1936
- Harpendyreus noquasa (Trimen & Bowker, 1887)
- Leptotes brevidentatus (Tite, 1958)
- Leptotes jeanneli (Stempffer, 1935)
- Leptotes pirithous (Linnaeus, 1767)
- Leptotes pulchra (Murray, 1874)
- Tuxentius melaena (Trimen & Bowker, 1887)
- Tarucus bowkeri transvaalensis Quickelberge, 1972
- Tarucus sybaris (Hopffer, 1855)
- Zintha hintza (Trimen, 1864)
- Zizeeria knysna (Trimen, 1862)
- Zizina antanossa (Mabille, 1877)
- Actizera lucida (Trimen, 1883)
- Zizula hylax (Fabricius, 1775)
- Oraidium barberae (Trimen, 1868)
- Azanus jesous (Guérin-Méneville, 1849)
- Azanus mirza (Plötz, 1880)
- Azanus moriqua (Wallengren, 1857)
- Azanus natalensis (Trimen & Bowker, 1887)
- Azanus ubaldus (Stoll, 1782)
- Eicochrysops hippocrates (Fabricius, 1793)
- Eicochrysops messapus mahallakoaena (Wallengren, 1857)
- Euchrysops barkeri (Trimen, 1893)
- Euchrysops dolorosa (Trimen & Bowker, 1887)
- Euchrysops malathana (Boisduval, 1833)
- Euchrysops osiris (Hopffer, 1855)
- Euchrysops subpallida Bethune-Baker, 1923
- Orachrysops lacrimosa (Bethune-Baker, 1923)
- Freyeria trochylus (Freyer, [1843])
- Lepidochrysops glauca (Trimen & Bowker, 1887)
- Lepidochrysops ignota (Trimen & Bowker, 1887)
- Lepidochrysops irvingi (Swanepoel, 1948)
- Lepidochrysops patricia (Trimen & Bowker, 1887)
- Lepidochrysops plebeia (Butler, 1898)
- Lepidochrysops variabilis Cottrell, 1965

== Nymphalidae ==
=== Libytheinae ===
- Libythea labdaca laius Trimen, 1879

=== Danainae ===
==== Danaini ====
- Danaus chrysippus orientis (Aurivillius, 1909)
- Amauris niavius dominicanus Trimen, 1879
- Amauris albimaculata Butler, 1875
- Amauris echeria (Stoll, 1790)
- Amauris ochlea (Boisduval, 1847)

=== Satyrinae ===
==== Melanitini ====
- Aeropetes tulbaghia (Linnaeus, 1764)
- Paralethe dendrophilus junodi (van Son, 1935)
- Melanitis leda (Linnaeus, 1758)

==== Satyrini ====
- Bicyclus anynana (Butler, 1879)
- Bicyclus ena (Hewitson, 1877)
- Bicyclus safitza (Westwood, 1850)
- Heteropsis perspicua (Trimen, 1873)
- Ypthima asterope (Klug, 1832)
- Ypthima impura paupera Ungemach, 1932
- Coenyra hebe (Trimen, 1862)
- Physcaeneura panda (Boisduval, 1847)
- Neita neita (Wallengren, 1875)
- Cassionympha cassius (Godart, 1824)
- Pseudonympha poetula Trimen, 1891
- Stygionympha wichgrafi van Son, 1955
- Dingana angusta Henning & Henning, 1996

=== Charaxinae ===
==== Charaxini ====
- Charaxes varanes (Cramer, 1777)
- Charaxes candiope (Godart, 1824)
- Charaxes jasius saturnus Butler, 1866
- Charaxes castor flavifasciatus Butler, 1895
- Charaxes brutus natalensis Staudinger, 1885
- Charaxes druceanus moerens Jordan, 1936
- Charaxes bohemani Felder & Felder, 1859
- Charaxes xiphares draconis Jordan, 1936
- Charaxes cithaeron Felder & Felder, 1859
- Charaxes etesipe tavetensis Rothschild, 1894
- Charaxes achaemenes Felder & Felder, 1867
- Charaxes jahlusa argynnides Westwood, 1864
- Charaxes ethalion (Boisduval, 1847)
- Charaxes phaeus Hewitson, 1877
- Charaxes vansoni van Someren, 1975
- Charaxes zoolina (Westwood, [1850])

==== Euxanthini ====
- Charaxes wakefieldi (Ward, 1873)

=== Nymphalinae ===
==== Nymphalini ====
- Vanessa hippomene (Hübner, [1823])
- Vanessa cardui (Linnaeus, 1758)
- Junonia hierta cebrene Trimen, 1870
- Junonia natalica (Felder & Felder, 1860)
- Junonia oenone (Linnaeus, 1758)
- Junonia orithya madagascariensis Guenée, 1865
- Junonia terea elgiva Hewitson, 1864
- Protogoniomorpha anacardii nebulosa (Trimen, 1881)
- Protogoniomorpha parhassus (Drury, 1782)
- Precis antilope (Feisthamel, 1850)
- Precis archesia (Cramer, 1779)
- Precis ceryne (Boisduval, 1847)
- Precis octavia sesamus Trimen, 1883
- Precis tugela Trimen, 1879
- Hypolimnas anthedon wahlbergi (Wallengren, 1857)
- Hypolimnas misippus (Linnaeus, 1764)
- Catacroptera cloanthe (Stoll, 1781)

=== Biblidinae ===
==== Biblidini ====
- Byblia anvatara acheloia (Wallengren, 1857)
- Byblia ilithyia (Drury, 1773)
- Eurytela dryope angulata Aurivillius, 1899
- Eurytela hiarbas angustata Aurivillius, 1894

==== Epicaliini ====
- Sevenia boisduvali (Wallengren, 1857)
- Sevenia morantii (Trimen, 1881)
- Sevenia natalensis (Boisduval, 1847)

=== Limenitinae ===
==== Limenitidini ====
- Cymothoe alcimeda marieps Rydon, 1994
- Cymothoe coranus Grose-Smith, 1889
- Pseudacraea boisduvalii trimenii Butler, 1874
- Pseudacraea lucretia tarquinea (Trimen, 1868)

==== Neptidini ====
- Neptis laeta Overlaet, 1955
- Neptis saclava marpessa Hopffer, 1855

==== Adoliadini ====
- Hamanumida daedalus (Fabricius, 1775)

=== Heliconiinae ===
==== Acraeini ====
- Acraea cerasa Hewitson, 1861
- Acraea acara Hewitson, 1865
- Acraea anemosa Hewitson, 1865
- Acraea boopis Wichgraf, 1914
- Acraea horta (Linnaeus, 1764)
- Acraea neobule Doubleday, 1847
- Acraea rabbaiae perlucida Henning & Henning, 1996
- Acraea satis Ward, 1871
- Acraea nohara Boisduval, 1847
- Acraea violarum Boisduval, 1847
- Acraea aglaonice Westwood, 1881
- Acraea axina Westwood, 1881
- Acraea caldarena Hewitson, 1877
- Acraea natalica Boisduval, 1847
- Acraea oncaea Hopffer, 1855
- Acraea aganice Hewitson, 1852
- Acraea cabira Hopffer, 1855
- Acraea encedon (Linnaeus, 1758)
- Acraea serena (Fabricius, 1775)
- Acraea esebria Hewitson, 1861
- Acraea burni Butler, 1896
- Acraea anacreon Trimen, 1868
- Pardopsis punctatissima (Boisduval, 1833)

==== Vagrantini ====
- Lachnoptera ayresii Trimen, 1879
- Phalanta eurytis (Doubleday, 1847)
- Phalanta phalantha aethiopica (Rothschild & Jordan, 1903)

== Hesperiidae ==
=== Coeliadinae ===
- Coeliades forestan (Stoll, [1782])
- Coeliades libeon (Druce, 1875)
- Coeliades lorenzo Evans, 1947
- Coeliades pisistratus (Fabricius, 1793)

=== Pyrginae ===
==== Celaenorrhinini ====
- Celaenorrhinus mokeezi separata (Strand, 1911)
- Eretis djaelaelae (Wallengren, 1857)
- Eretis umbra (Trimen, 1862)
- Sarangesa motozi (Wallengren, 1857)
- Sarangesa phidyle (Walker, 1870)
- Sarangesa seineri durbana Evans, 1937

==== Tagiadini ====
- Tagiades flesus (Fabricius, 1781)
- Eagris nottoana (Wallengren, 1857)
- Caprona pillaana Wallengren, 1857
- Netrobalane canopus (Trimen, 1864)
- Leucochitonea levubu Wallengren, 1857
- Abantis paradisea (Butler, 1870)
- Abantis tettensis Hopffer, 1855
- Abantis venosa Trimen & Bowker, 1889

==== Carcharodini ====
- Spialia asterodia (Trimen, 1864)
- Spialia colotes transvaaliae (Trimen & Bowker, 1889)
- Spialia confusa Evans, 1937
- Spialia delagoae (Trimen, 1898)
- Spialia depauperata australis de Jong, 1978
- Spialia diomus ferax (Wallengren, 1863)
- Spialia dromus (Plötz, 1884)
- Spialia mafa (Trimen, 1870)
- Spialia secessus (Trimen, 1891)
- Spialia spio (Linnaeus, 1764)
- Gomalia elma (Trimen, 1862)

=== Hesperiinae ===
==== Aeromachini ====
- Kedestes barberae (Trimen, 1873)
- Kedestes callicles (Hewitson, 1868)
- Kedestes macomo (Trimen, 1862)
- Kedestes mohozutza (Wallengren, 1857)
- Kedestes wallengrenii (Trimen, 1883)
- Parosmodes morantii (Trimen, 1873)
- Acleros mackenii (Trimen, 1868)
- Andronymus neander (Plötz, 1884)
- Zophopetes dysmephila (Trimen, 1868)
- Artitropa erinnys (Trimen, 1862)
- Fresna nyassae (Hewitson, 1878)
- Platylesches ayresii (Trimen & Bowker, 1889)
- Platylesches moritili (Wallengren, 1857)
- Platylesches neba (Hewitson, 1877)
- Platylesches robustus Neave, 1910

==== Baorini ====
- Zenonia zeno (Trimen, 1864)
- Pelopidas mathias (Fabricius, 1798)
- Pelopidas thrax (Hübner, 1821)
- Borbo borbonica (Boisduval, 1833)
- Borbo detecta (Trimen, 1893)
- Borbo fallax (Gaede, 1916)
- Borbo fatuellus (Hopffer, 1855)
- Borbo gemella (Mabille, 1884)
- Borbo holtzi (Plötz, 1883)
- Parnara monasi (Trimen & Bowker, 1889)
- Gegenes hottentota (Latreille, 1824)
- Gegenes niso (Linnaeus, 1764)
- Gegenes pumilio gambica (Mabille, 1878)

=== Heteropterinae ===
- Metisella abdeli (Krüger, 1928)
- Metisella metis paris Evans, 1937
- Tsitana tsita (Trimen, 1870)

== See also ==
- List of moths of Eswatini
- Wildlife of Eswatini
