= Lepidochrysops victori =

Conservation status
- Vulnerable (IUCN 3.1)

Scientific classification
- Kingdom: Animalia
- Phylum: Arthropoda
- Class: Insecta
- Order: Lepidoptera
- Family: Lycaenidae
- Genus: Lepidochrysops
- Species: L. victori

Binomial name
- Lepidochrysops victori Pringle, 1984

Species of butterfly

Lepidochrysops victori, the Victor's blue, is a species of butterfly in the family Lycaenidae. It is endemic to South Africa, where it is only known from four small areas on the Groot Winterberg in the Eastern Cape.

The wingspan is 31–35 mm for males and 32–36 mm for females. Adults are on wing from mid-February to the end of March. There is one generation per year.

The larvae feed on Selago corymbosa.
