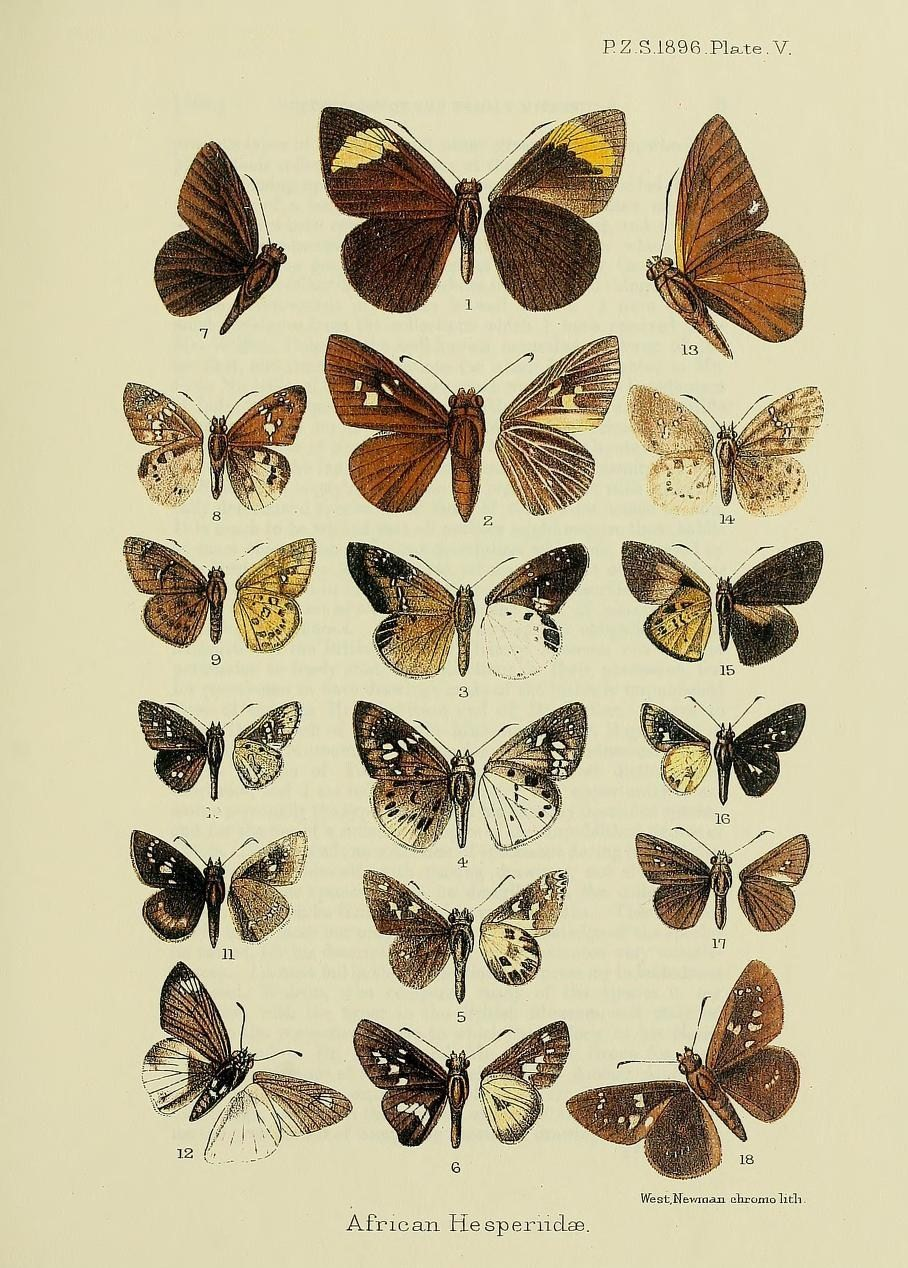
- Eagris tetrastigma figure 15

Scientific classification
- Kingdom: Animalia
- Phylum: Arthropoda
- Clade: Pancrustacea
- Class: Insecta
- Order: Lepidoptera
- Family: Hesperiidae
- Genus: Eagris
- Species: E. tetrastigma

Binomial name
- Eagris tetrastigma (Mabille, 1891)

Synonyms
- List: Ceratrichia tetrastigma Mabille, 1891; Trichosemeia tristifica Aurivillius, 1925; Tricosemeia subolivescens Holland, 1892

= Eagris tetrastigma =

Species of butterfly

Eagris tetrastigma, commonly known as the black flat, is a species of butterfly in the family Hesperiidae. It is found in Guinea, Sierra Leone, Liberia, Ivory Coast, Ghana, Togo, Nigeria, Cameroon, the Republic of the Congo, the Central African Republic, the Democratic Republic of the Congo and Uganda. The habitat consists of primary and secondary forests.

== Subspecies ==
- Eagris tetrastigma tetrastigma - eastern Nigeria, Cameroon, Democratic Republic of Congo, Congo, Central African Republic, western Uganda
- Eagris tetrastigma subolivescens (Holland, 1892) - Guinea, Sierra Leone, Liberia, Ivory Coast, Ghana, Togo, western Nigeria

Torben Larsen developed a species numbering system for his 2005 publication Butterflies of West Africa. The subspecies subolivescens is #1238. The 'Larsen' numbers have since been used with permission in A Sharp Eye on Butterflies of Ghana.
