= Lepidochrysops variabilis =

Scientific classification
- Kingdom: Animalia
- Phylum: Arthropoda
- Class: Insecta
- Order: Lepidoptera
- Family: Lycaenidae
- Genus: Lepidochrysops
- Species: L. variabilis

Binomial name
- Lepidochrysops variabilis Cottrell, 1965

Species of butterfly

Lepidochrysops variabilis, the variable blue, is a butterfly of the family Lycaenidae. It is found in South Africa, from the Cape Peninsula, inland along the western mountains to southern Namaqualand, along the eastern Drakensberg to the Eastern Cape, KwaZulu-Natal, the Free State, Lesotho, Mpumalanga, the southern Limpopo, then west to the central Limpopo, North West and the hills of Gauteng. It is also found in eastern Zimbabwe.

The wingspan is 28–35 mm for males and 34–37 mm for females. Adults are on wing from September to February (with peaks in October and January). There are two generations per year, but only one at high altitudes with adults on wing from December to January.

The larvae feed on Selago species (including Selago corymbosa), Ocimum and Salvia species. Third and later instar larvae feed on the brood of Camponotus niveosetus ants.
