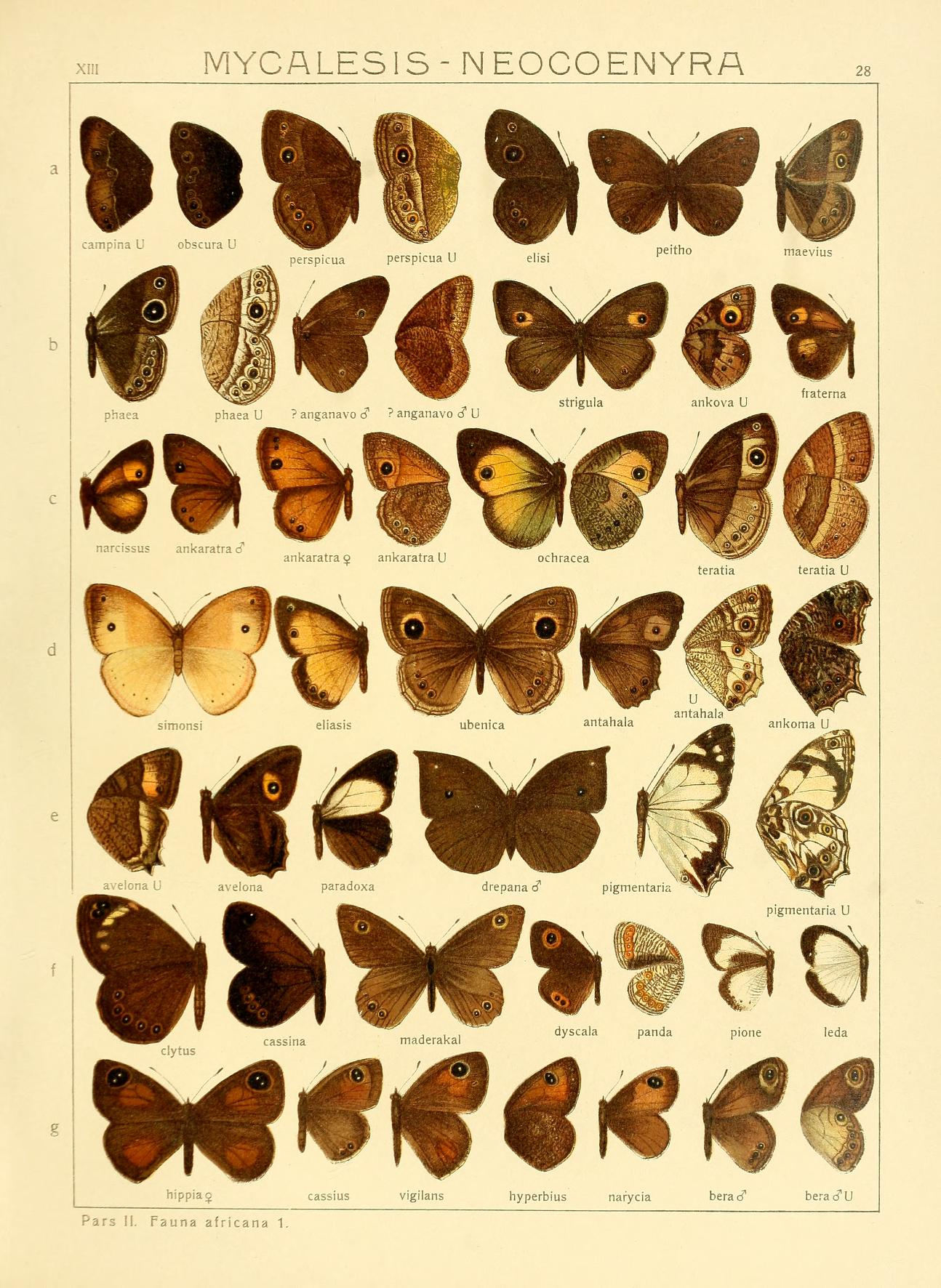

Scientific classification
- Domain: Eukaryota
- Kingdom: Animalia
- Phylum: Arthropoda
- Class: Insecta
- Order: Lepidoptera
- Family: Nymphalidae
- Subtribe: Satyrina
- Genus: Physcaeneura; Wallengren, 1857

Type species
- Satyrus panda Boisduval, 1847

Diversity
- 5 species

Synonyms
- Periplysia Gerstaecker, 1871; Physcoeneura (missp.); Physconeura (missp.)

= Physcaeneura =

Genus of butterflies

Physcaeneura is a butterfly genus from the subfamily Satyrinae in the family Nymphalidae.

== Species ==
- Physcaeneura jacksoni Carcasson, 1961
- Physcaeneura leda (Gerstaecker, 1871)
- Physcaeneura panda (Boisduval, 1847)
- Physcaeneura pione Godman, 1880
- Physcaeneura robertsi Kielland, 1990
