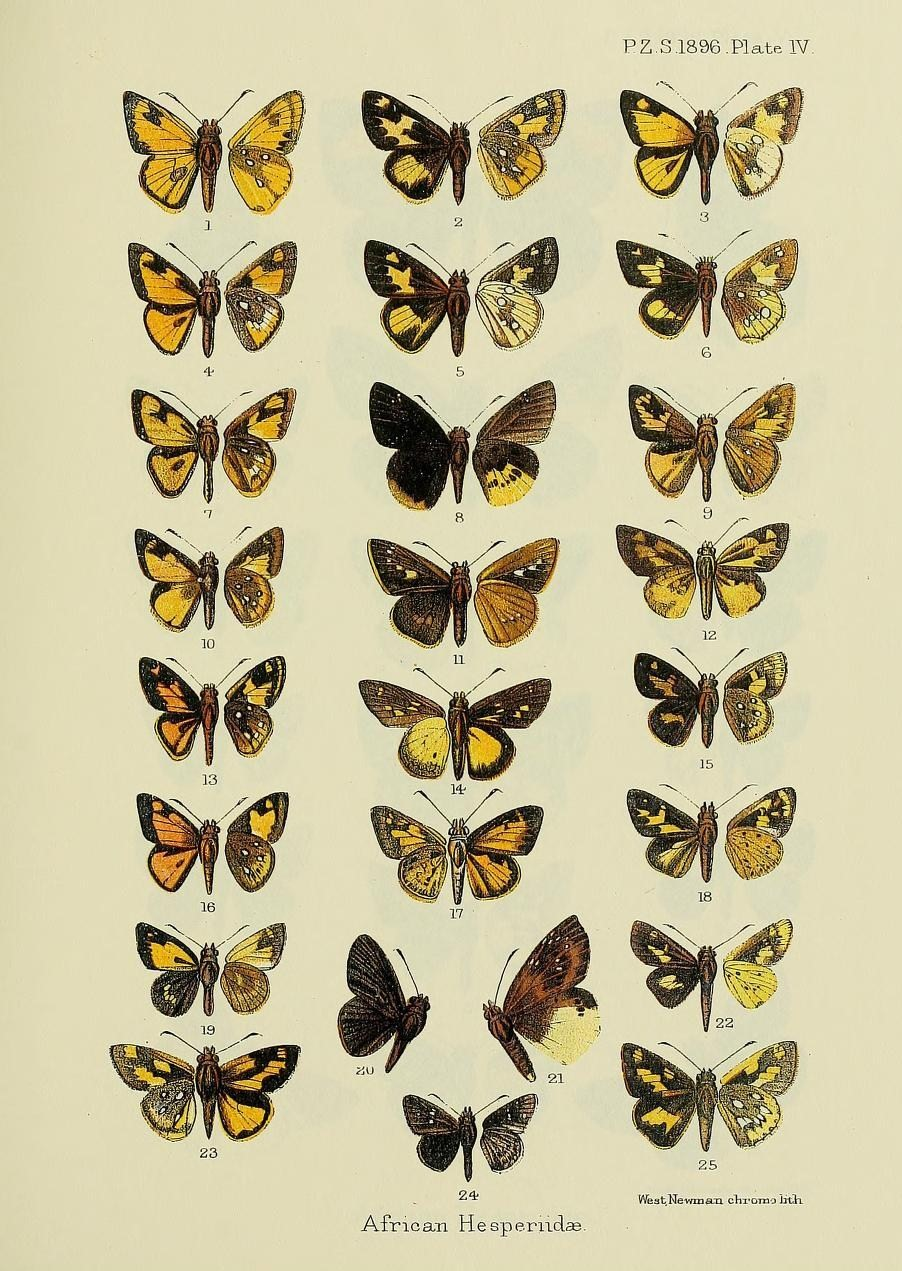
- Figure 21

Scientific classification
- Domain: Eukaryota
- Kingdom: Animalia
- Phylum: Arthropoda
- Class: Insecta
- Order: Lepidoptera
- Family: Hesperiidae
- Genus: Eagris
- Species: E. hereus

Binomial name
- Eagris hereus (H. Druce, 1875)

Synonyms
- Tagiades hereus H. Druce, 1875; Trichosemeia birgitta Strand, 1913; Ceratrichia quaterna Mabille, 1890

= Eagris hereus =

Species of butterfly

Eagris hereus, commonly known as the beautiful orange flat, is a species of butterfly in the family Hesperiidae. It is found in Guinea, Sierra Leone, Ivory Coast, Ghana, Togo, Nigeria, Cameroon, Gabon, Angola and the Central African Republic. The habitat consists of forests.

Adults are attracted to flowers.

== Subspecies ==
- Eagris hereus hereus - Cameroon, Gabon, Angola, Central African Republic
- Eagris hereus quaterna (Mabille, 1890) - Guinea, Sierra Leone, Ivory Coast, Ghana, Togo, Nigeria, western Cameroon
