= Cassionympha detecta =

Cape brown

Scientific classification
- Domain: Eukaryota
- Kingdom: Animalia
- Phylum: Arthropoda
- Class: Insecta
- Order: Lepidoptera
- Family: Nymphalidae
- Genus: Cassionympha
- Species: C. detecta

Binomial name
- Cassionympha detecta (Trimen, 1914)

Synonyms
- Pseudonympha detecta Trimen, 1914

Species of butterfly

Cassionympha detecta, the Cape brown, is a butterfly of the family Nymphalidae. It is found in South Africa, in the mountains of the Western Cape from Cederberg to Swartberg down to the coast, then along the south-east coast and hills to the Eastern Cape and into Great Karoo.

The wingspan is 33–37 mm for males and 34–38 mm for females. Adults are on wing from September to April (with a peak from October to March).

The larvae feed on various sedges and restios, including Ficinia ramosissima, Ficinia elongata, possibly Ficinia acuminate, Restio species, including Restio tenuissimus.
