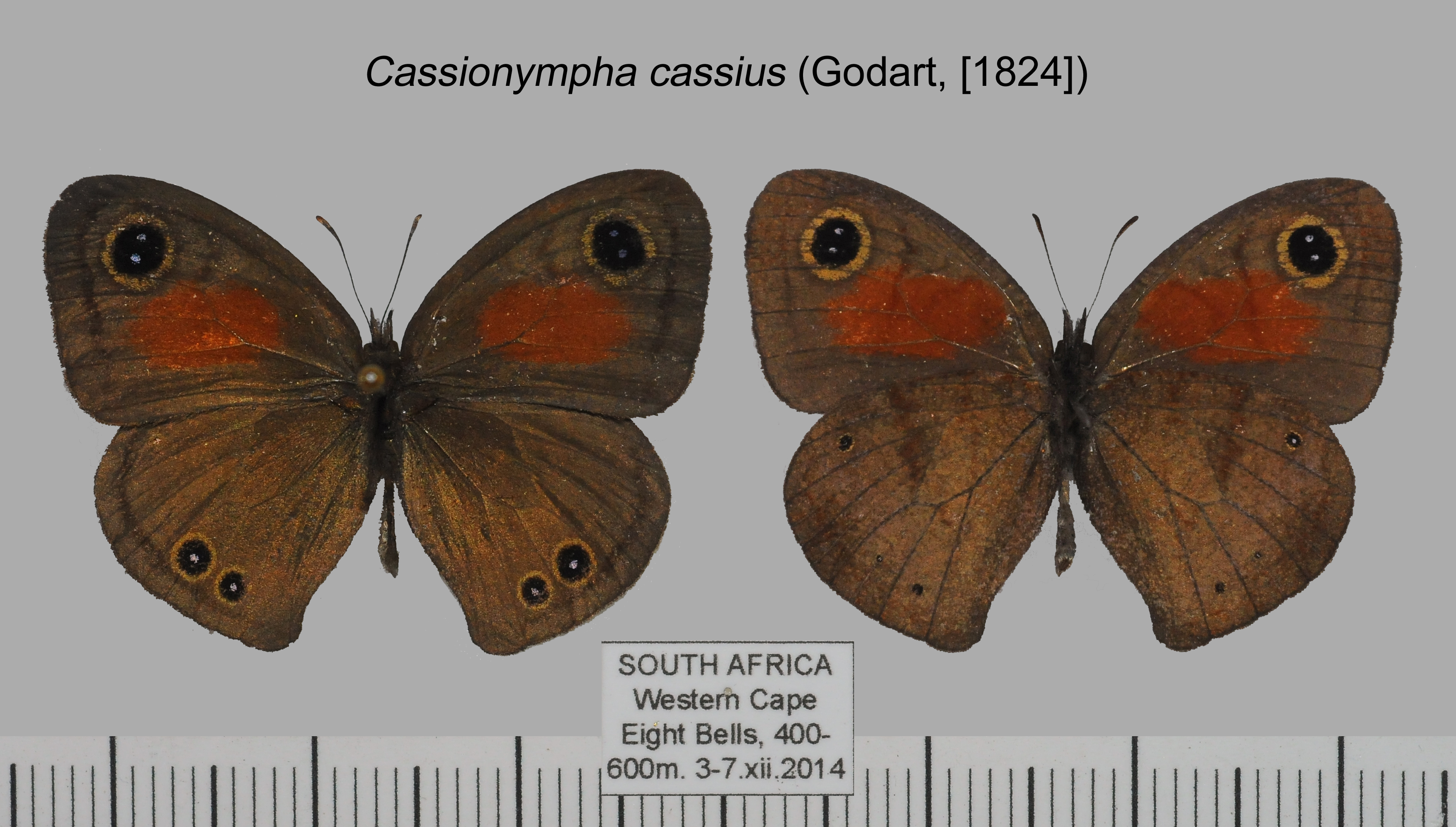

Scientific classification
- Domain: Eukaryota
- Kingdom: Animalia
- Phylum: Arthropoda
- Class: Insecta
- Order: Lepidoptera
- Family: Nymphalidae
- Tribe: Satyrini
- Genus: Cassionympha van Son, 1955

Type species
- Satyrus cassius Godart, [1824]

Diversity
- Three species

= Cassionympha =

Genus of insects

Cassionympha is a genus of butterflies from the subfamily Satyrinae in the family Nymphalidae.

== Species ==
- Cassionympha camdeboo (Dickson, 1981)
- Cassionympha cassius (Godart, [1824])
- Cassionympha detecta (Trimen, 1914)
