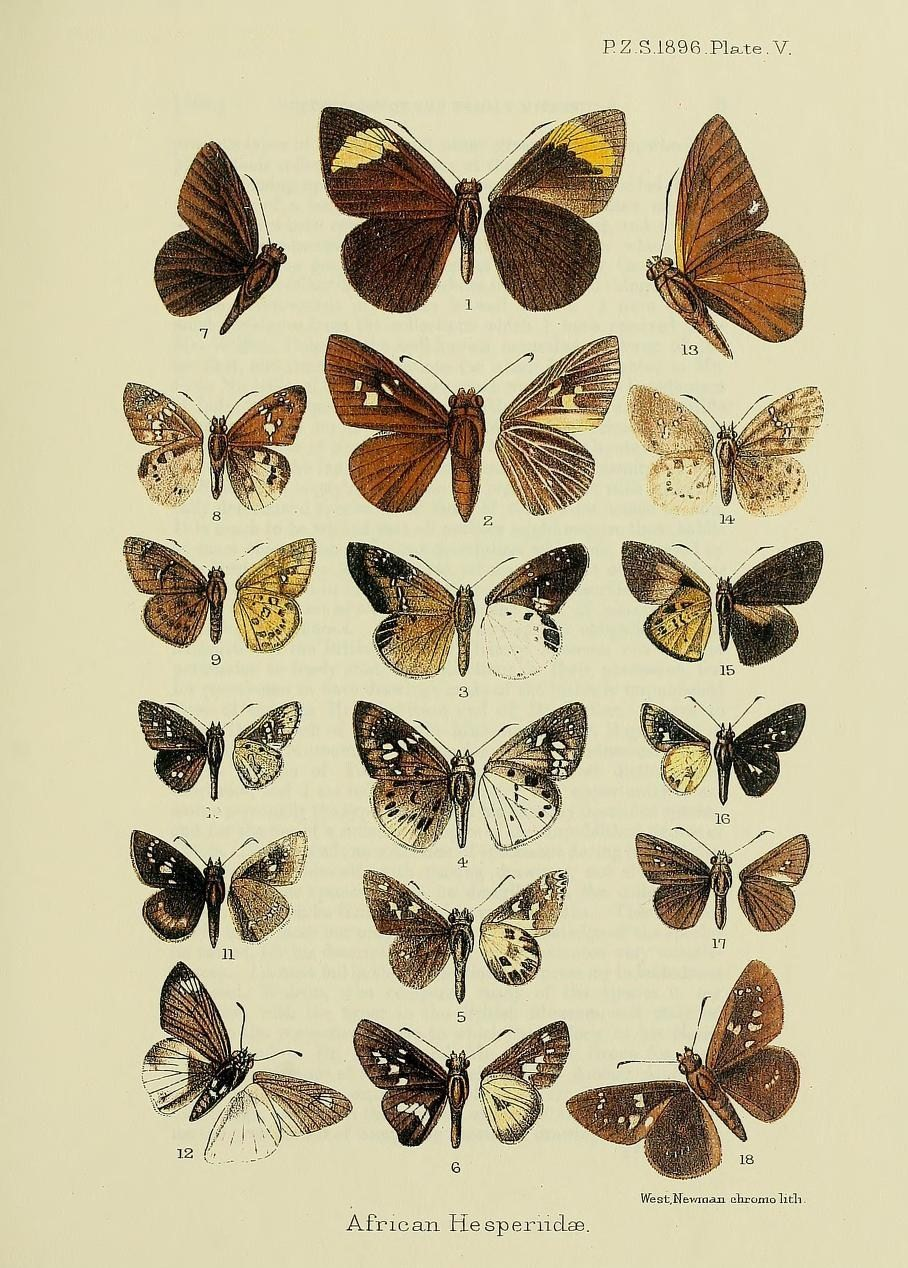
- Eagris subalbida figure 3

Scientific classification
- Kingdom: Animalia
- Phylum: Arthropoda
- Clade: Pancrustacea
- Class: Insecta
- Order: Lepidoptera
- Family: Hesperiidae
- Genus: Eagris
- Species: E. subalbida

Binomial name
- Eagris subalbida (Holland, 1893)

Synonyms
- List: Sarangesa subalbida Holland, 1893; Trichosemeia terastigma var. albiventer Strand, 1913; Sarangesa thecla var. obscura Aurivillius, 1925; Sarangesa aurivillii Neustetter, 1927; Sarangesa theclides Holland, 1896

= Eagris subalbida =

Species of butterfly

Eagris subalbida, commonly known as the chocolate flat, is a species of butterfly in the family Hesperiidae. It is found in Guinea, Ivory Coast, Ghana, Nigeria, Cameroon, Gabon, the Republic of the Congo, the Central African Republic, Uganda and Rwanda. The habitat consists of forests.

Adult males are known to feed from flowers and bird droppings.

== Subspecies ==
- Eagris subalbida subalbida - Guinea, Ivory Coast, Ghana, eastern Nigeria, Cameroon
- Eagris subalbida aurivillii (Neustetter, 1927) - Gabon, Congo, Central African Republic, Uganda, Rwanda

Torben Larsen developed a species numbering system for his 2005 publication Butterflies of West Africa. The nominate subspecies is #1236. The 'Larsen' numbers have since been used with permission in A Sharp Eye on Butterflies of Ghana.
