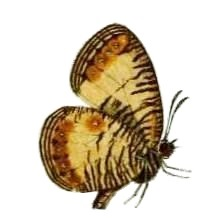

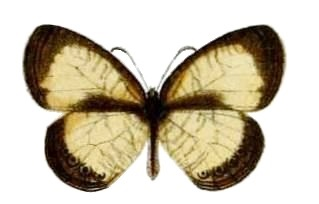

Scientific classification
- Domain: Eukaryota
- Kingdom: Animalia
- Phylum: Arthropoda
- Class: Insecta
- Order: Lepidoptera
- Family: Nymphalidae
- Genus: Physcaeneura
- Species: P. pione

Binomial name
- Physcaeneura pione Godman, 1880

Synonyms
- Periplysia johnstoni Butler, 1894; Physcaeneura pione var. lucida Butler, 1897

= Physcaeneura pione =

Species of butterfly

Physcaeneura pione, the light webbed ringlet, is a butterfly in the family Nymphalidae. It is found in north-eastern and western Tanzania, the Democratic Republic of the Congo, northern Zambia, Malawi, western Mozambique and eastern Zimbabwe. The habitat consists of moist savanna.

Adults are on wing from December to May.

The larvae feed on Siphonochilus species.
