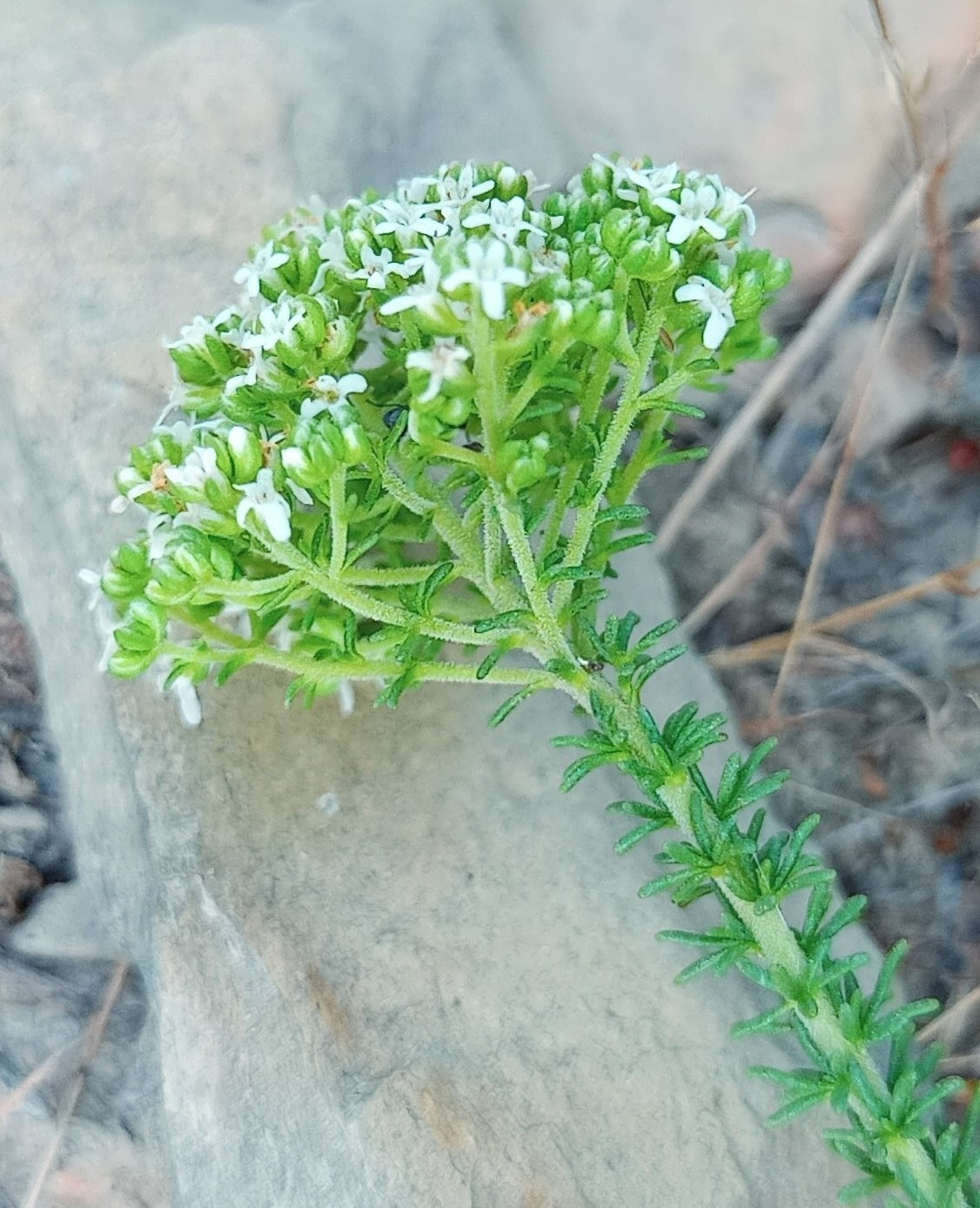

Scientific classification
- Kingdom: Plantae
- Clade: Tracheophytes
- Clade: Angiosperms
- Clade: Eudicots
- Clade: Asterids
- Order: Lamiales
- Family: Scrophulariaceae
- Genus: Selago
- Species: S. dolosa

Binomial name
- Selago dolosa Hilliard

= Selago dolosa =

Species of flowering plant

Selago dolosa is a species of plant in the family Scrophulariaceae. It is endemic to South Africa.

== Description ==
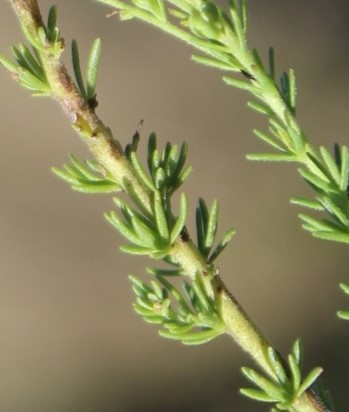
The fascicled leaves of Selago dolosa, Eastern Cape, South Africa

A perennial, woody, loosely-branching shrublet. One of a group of southern African Selago species (including Selago corymbosa, Selago punctata, and Selago variicalyx) that have fascicled leaves, pubescent stems, and an inflorescence that is a corymbose panicle.

Selago dolosa is frequently confused with the related species Selago corymbosa, but can be distinguished by the following characters:

- The leaves of S. dolosa are broader (length:width ratio 2.5-7 : 1 rather than 10-24 : 1), shorter (2-7mm rather than 5-12mm), and less hairy (usually only glandular-punctate over most of their surface). The S. dolosa leaves also lack a raised midrib blow, and margins that recurve when dry.
- The bracts of S. dolosa are also broader (0.7-1.25mm rather than 0.4-0.7mm).

== Distribution ==
Selago dolosa is mainly confined to the southern Cape regions of South Africa, where it occurs from near Caledon in the west, to the East London and Butterworth regions in the east.
