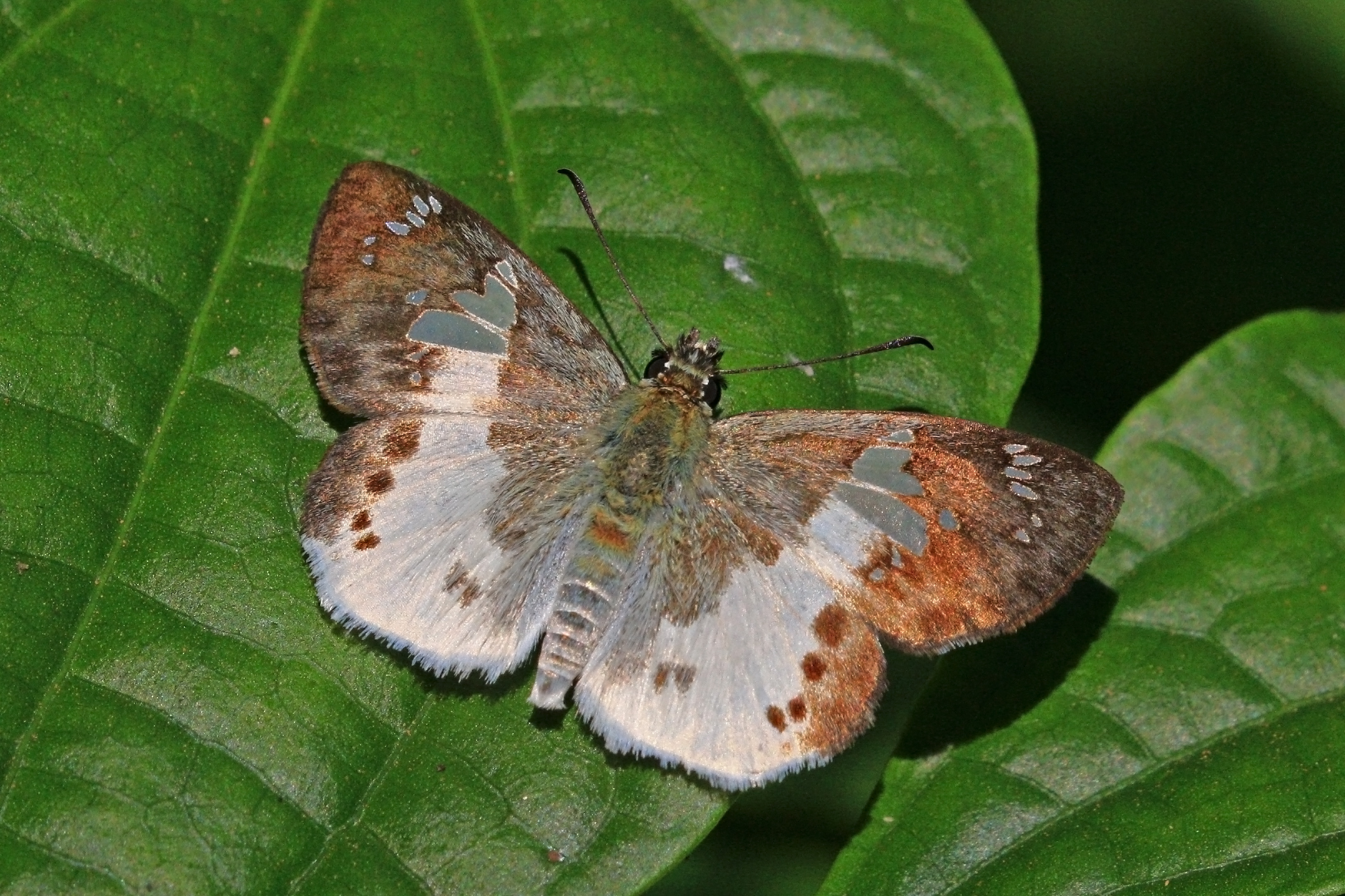
- Kakamega Forest, Kenya

Scientific classification
- Domain: Eukaryota
- Kingdom: Animalia
- Phylum: Arthropoda
- Class: Insecta
- Order: Lepidoptera
- Family: Hesperiidae
- Genus: Eagris
- Species: E. lucetia

Binomial name
- Eagris lucetia (Hewitson, 1875)

Synonyms
- Leucochitonea lucetia Hewitson, 1875

= Eagris lucetia =

Species of butterfly

Eagris lucetia is a species of butterfly in the family Hesperiidae. It is found in Cameroon, the Republic of Congo, the Democratic Republic of Congo, southern Sudan, Uganda, western Kenya, western Tanzania, Angola and northern Zambia. The habitat consists of forests and forest margins.

The larvae feed on Rhus vulgaris, Rhus villosa and Allophylus subcoriaceus.
