= Physcaeneura jacksoni =

Scientific classification
- Kingdom: Animalia
- Phylum: Arthropoda
- Class: Insecta
- Order: Lepidoptera
- Family: Nymphalidae
- Genus: Physcaeneura
- Species: P. jacksoni

Binomial name
- Physcaeneura jacksoni Carcasson, 1961

Species of butterfly

Physcaeneura jacksoni is a butterfly in the family Nymphalidae. It is found in north-eastern Tanzania.
