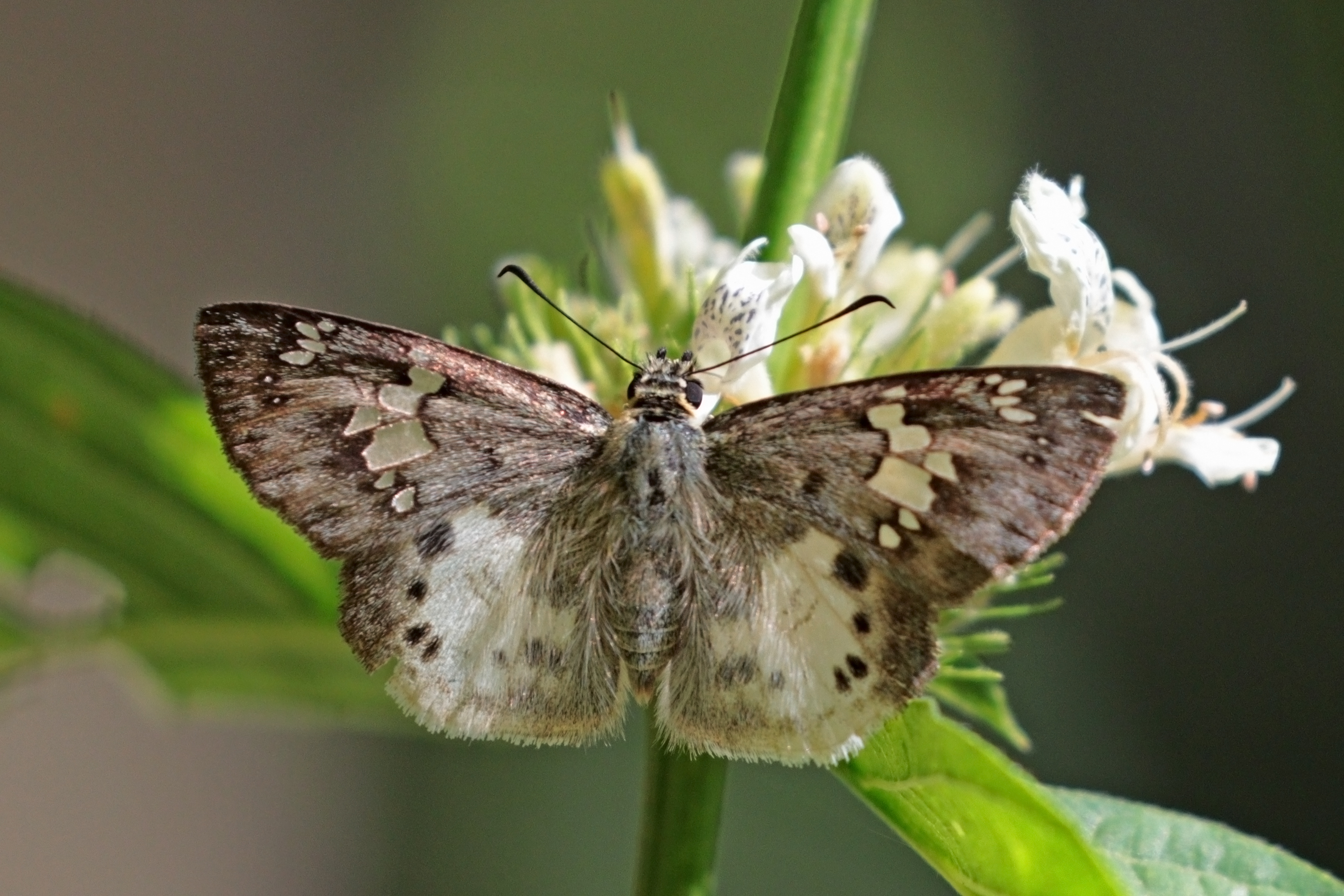
- Eagris denuba

Scientific classification
- Kingdom: Animalia
- Phylum: Arthropoda
- Class: Insecta
- Order: Lepidoptera
- Family: Hesperiidae
- Tribe: Tagiadini
- Genus: Eagris; Guenée, 1862

Synonyms
- Trichosemeia Holland, 1892

= Eagris =

Genus of butterflies

Eagris is a genus of skippers in the family Hesperiidae.

== Species ==
- Eagris decastigma Mabille, 1891
- Eagris denuba (Plötz, 1879)
- Eagris hereus (Druce, 1875)
- Eagris lucetia (Hewitson, 1875)
- Eagris nottoana (Wallengren, 1857)
- Eagris sabadius (Gray, 1832)
- Eagris subalbida (Holland, 1893)
- Eagris tetrastigma (Mabille, 1891)
- Eagris tigris Evans, 1937
