= Cnodontes vansomereni =

Scientific classification
- Domain: Eukaryota
- Kingdom: Animalia
- Phylum: Arthropoda
- Class: Insecta
- Order: Lepidoptera
- Family: Lycaenidae
- Genus: Cnodontes
- Species: C. vansomereni

Binomial name
- Cnodontes vansomereni Stempffer & Bennett, 1953

Species of butterfly

Cnodontes vansomereni, the Van Someren's buff, is a butterfly in the family Lycaenidae. It is found in south-western Kenya, Tanzania, Malawi, Zambia (from Lusaka northwards), the Democratic Republic of the Congo (Lualaba and Haut-Shaba) and Angola. The habitat consists of deciduous woodland, thorn-bush and Brachystegia woodland.
