= Cassionympha camdeboo =

Camdeboo brown

Scientific classification
- Kingdom: Animalia
- Phylum: Arthropoda
- Class: Insecta
- Order: Lepidoptera
- Family: Nymphalidae
- Genus: Cassionympha
- Species: C. camdeboo

Binomial name
- Cassionympha camdeboo (Dickson, 1981)

Synonyms
- Pseudonympha camdeboo Dickson 1981

Species of butterfly

Cassionympha camdeboo, the Camdeboo brown, is a butterfly of the family Nymphalidae. It is found in South Africa, it is only known from the dry Nama Karoo of the Camdeboo Mountains near Aberdeen in the Eastern Cape.

The wingspan is 33–37 mm for males and 34–38 mm for females. Adults are on wing from November to December. There is one generation per year.

The larvae probably feed on Poaceae, including grasses, sedges and restios.
