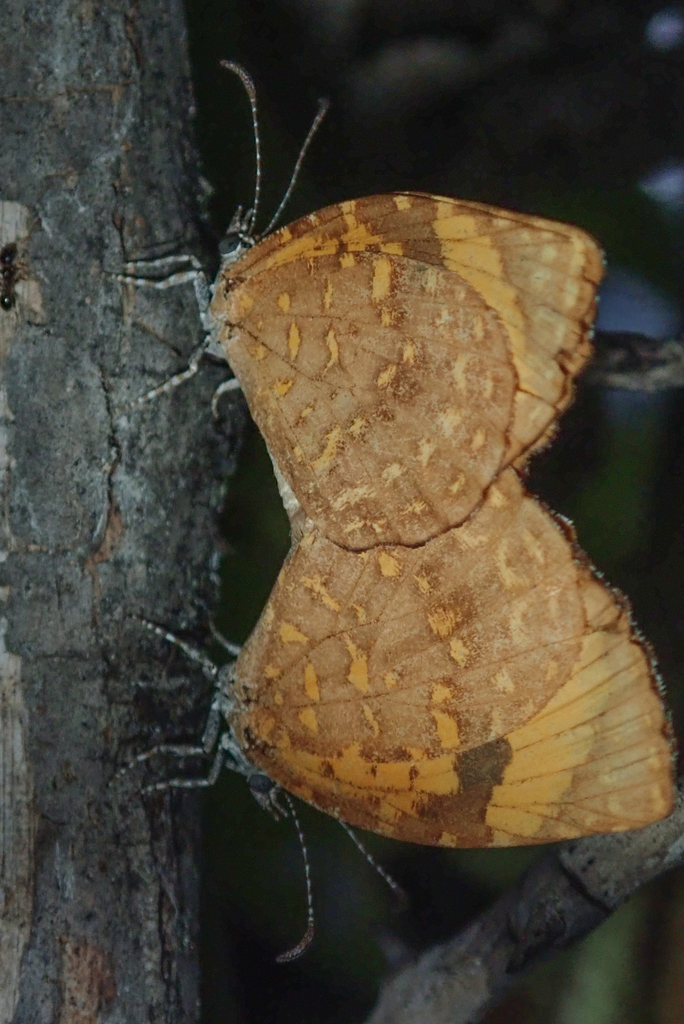
- Cnodontes pallida butterfly

Scientific classification
- Kingdom: Animalia
- Phylum: Arthropoda
- Clade: Pancrustacea
- Class: Insecta
- Order: Lepidoptera
- Family: Lycaenidae
- Subfamily: Poritiinae
- Genus: Cnodontes; Stempffer & Bennett, 1953

= Cnodontes =

Butterfly genus in family Lycaenidae

Cnodontes is a genus of butterflies in the family Lycaenidae. The species of this genus are endemic to the Afrotropical realm.

== Species ==
- Cnodontes bouyeri Kielland, 1994
- Cnodontes pallida (Trimen, 1898)
- Cnodontes penningtoni Bennett, 1954
- Cnodontes vansomereni Stempffer & Bennett, 1953
