= Physcaeneura robertsi =

Scientific classification
- Kingdom: Animalia
- Phylum: Arthropoda
- Class: Insecta
- Order: Lepidoptera
- Family: Nymphalidae
- Genus: Physcaeneura
- Species: P. robertsi

Binomial name
- Physcaeneura robertsi Kielland, 1990

Species of butterfly

Physcaeneura robertsi is a butterfly in the family Nymphalidae. It is found in central Tanzania.
