= Cnodontes bouyeri =

Scientific classification
- Kingdom: Animalia
- Phylum: Arthropoda
- Class: Insecta
- Order: Lepidoptera
- Family: Lycaenidae
- Genus: Cnodontes
- Species: C. bouyeri

Binomial name
- Cnodontes bouyeri Kielland, 1994

Species of butterfly

Cnodontes bouyeri is a butterfly in the family Lycaenidae. It is found in the Democratic Republic of the Congo (Shaba). Its habitat consists of woodland.
