= Eagris tigris =

Scientific classification
- Domain: Eukaryota
- Kingdom: Animalia
- Phylum: Arthropoda
- Class: Insecta
- Order: Lepidoptera
- Family: Hesperiidae
- Genus: Eagris
- Species: E. tigris

Binomial name
- Eagris tigris Evans, 1937

Species of butterfly

Eagris tigris, commonly known as the western tiger flat, is a species of butterfly in the family Hesperiidae. It is found in Ivory Coast, Ghana, Nigeria, Cameroon, the Central African Republic, Angola, Sudan, the Democratic Republic of the Congo and Uganda. The habitat consists of forests.

== Subspecies ==
- Eagris tigris tigris - eastern Democratic Republic of the Congo, Uganda
- Eagris tigris kayonza Evans, 1956 - Uganda: south-west to the Kigezi district
- Eagris tigris liberti Collins & Larsen, 2005 - Ivory Coast, Ghana, Nigeria, Cameroon, Central African Republic, Angola, southern Sudan
