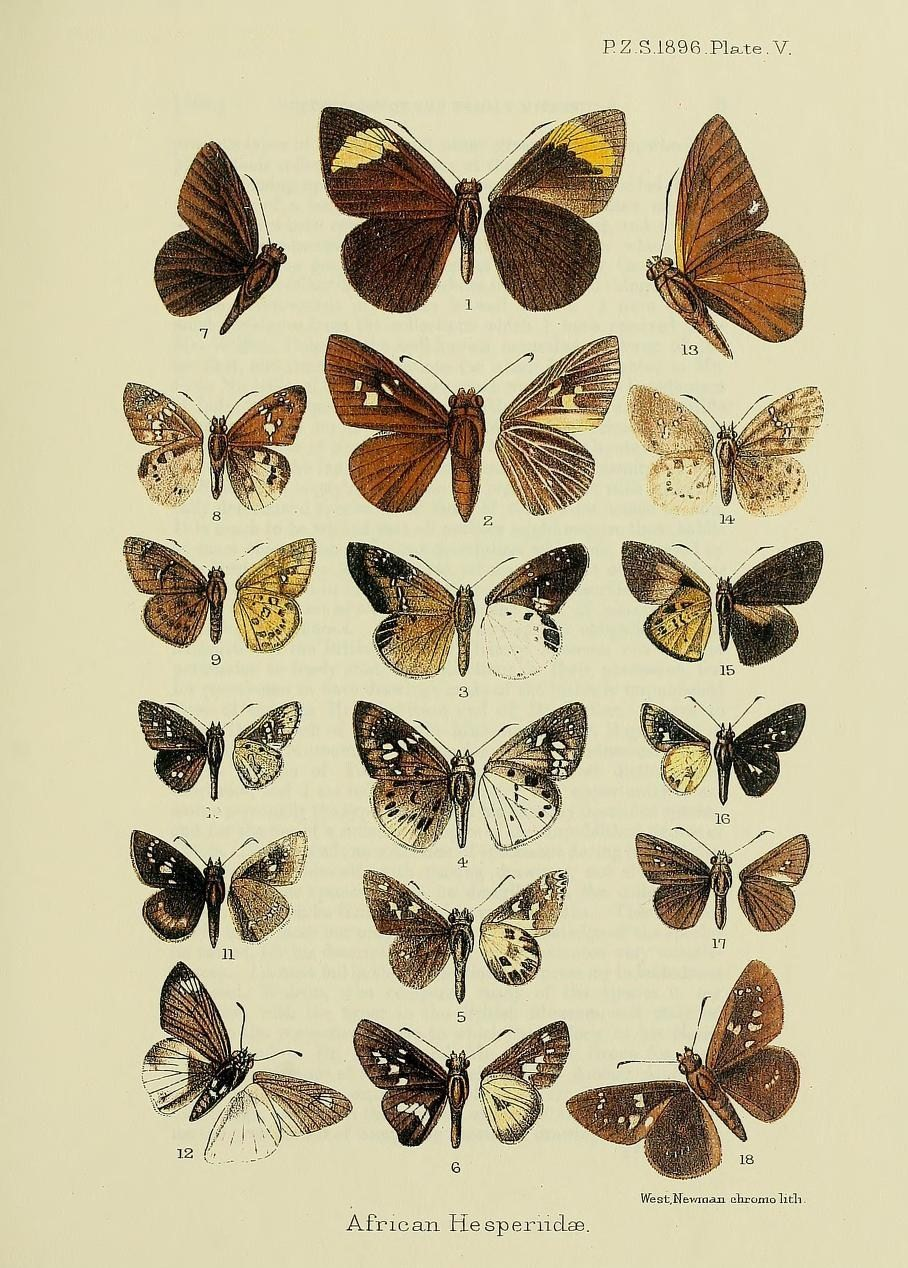
- Eagris decastigma fuscosa figure 4

Scientific classification
- Domain: Eukaryota
- Kingdom: Animalia
- Phylum: Arthropoda
- Class: Insecta
- Order: Lepidoptera
- Family: Hesperiidae
- Genus: Eagris
- Species: E. decastigma

Binomial name
- Eagris decastigma Mabille, 1891

Synonyms
- Aegris fuscosa Holland, 1893

= Eagris decastigma =

Species of butterfly

Eagris decastigma, commonly known as the purple flat, is a species of butterfly in the family Hesperiidae. It is found in Guinea, Sierra Leone, Ivory Coast, Ghana, Nigeria, Cameroon, the Republic of the Congo, Gabon, the Democratic Republic of the Congo, Sudan, Uganda, Kenya, Tanzania and Zambia. The habitat consists of paths and clearings in dense forests.

Adult males visit urine patches.

== Subspecies ==
- Eagris decastigma decastigma - Guinea, Sierra Leone, Ivory Coast, Ghana, Nigeria, Cameroon
- Eagris decastigma fuscosa (Holland, 1893) - Nigeria, Cameroon, Gabon, Congo
- Eagris decastigma purpura Evans, 1937 - southern Sudan, Uganda, western Kenya, western Tanzania, Zambia, Democratic Republic of Congo: north-east to Ituri
