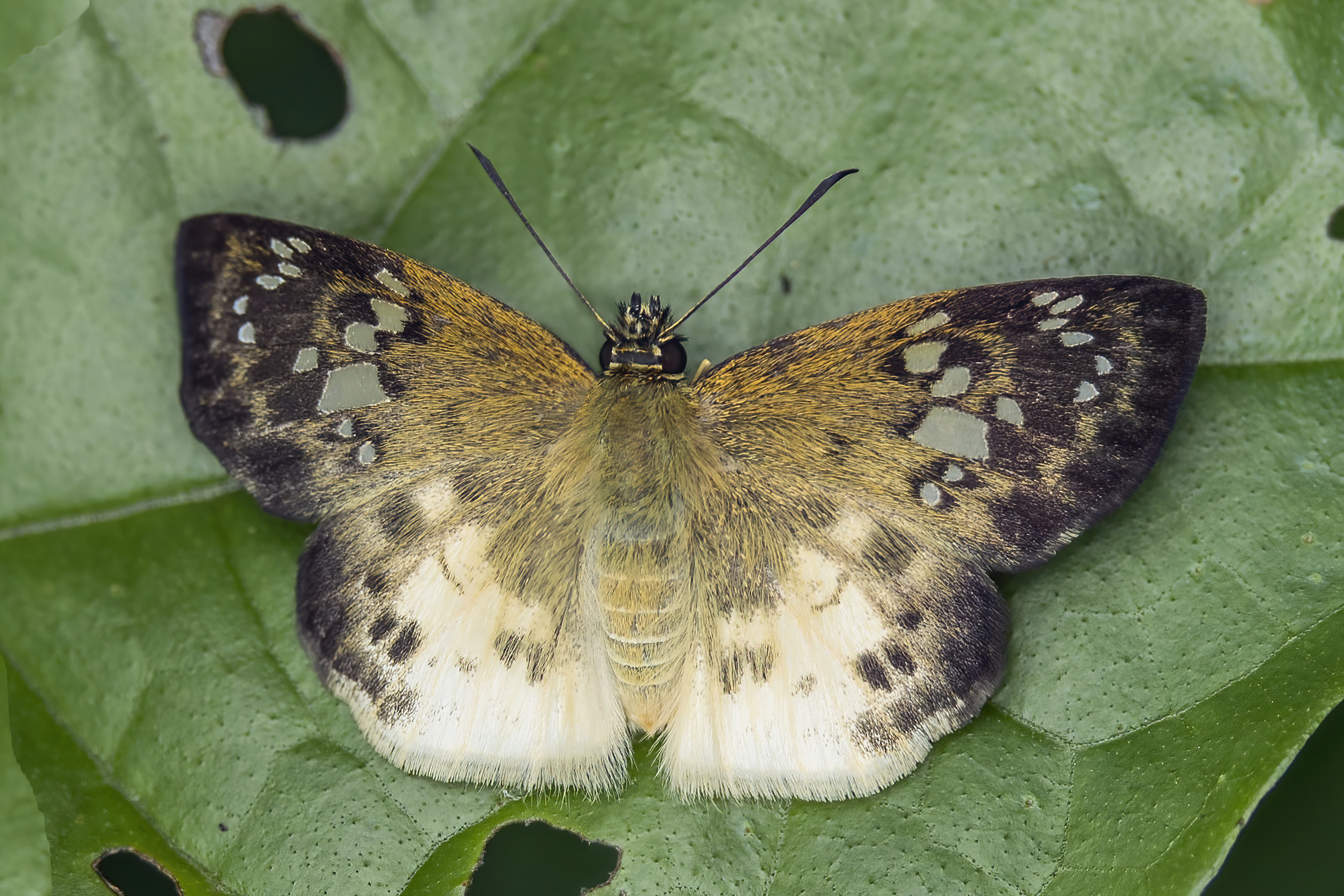
- male E. d. denuba, Ghana
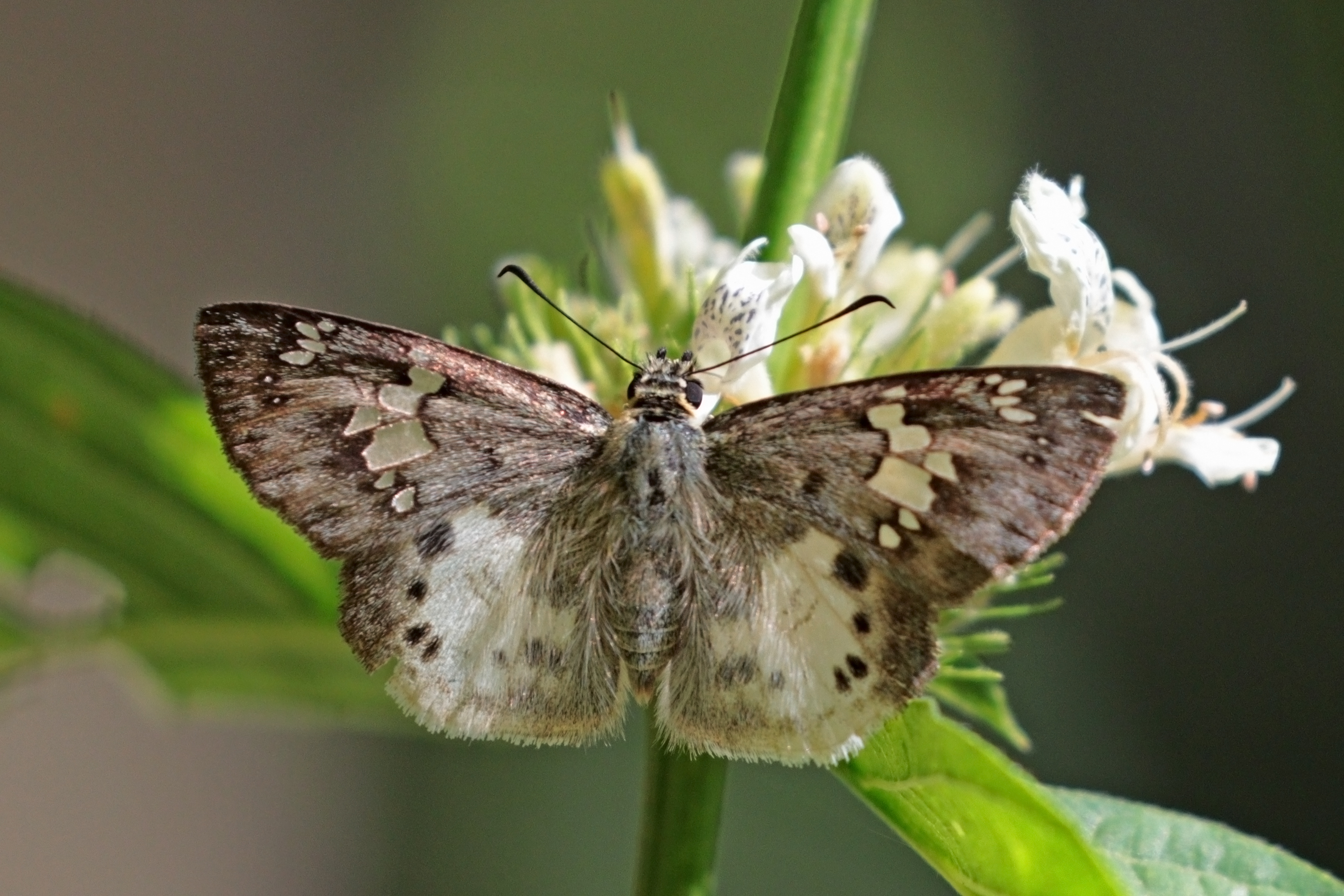
- E. d. obliterata, Ethiopia

Scientific classification
- Kingdom: Animalia
- Phylum: Arthropoda
- Clade: Pancrustacea
- Class: Insecta
- Order: Lepidoptera
- Family: Hesperiidae
- Genus: Eagris
- Species: E. denuba

Binomial name
- Eagris denuba (Plötz, 1879)

Synonyms
- Antigonus denuba Plötz, 1879; Eagris decolor Mabille, 1890; Eagris lucetia obliterata Carpenter, 1928

= Eagris denuba =

Species of butterfly

Eagris denuba, the cream flat, is a species of butterfly in the family Hesperiidae. It is found in Senegal, Guinea, Sierra Leone, Liberia, Ivory Coast, Ghana, Togo, Nigeria, Cameroon, Sudan and Ethiopia. The habitat consists of forests.

Adults of both sexes are attracted to flowers and males feed from bird droppings and occasionally mud-puddle.

== Subspecies ==
- Eagris denuba denuba - Senegal, Guinea, Sierra Leone, Liberia, Ivory Coast, Ghana, Togo, Nigeria, western Cameroon
- Eagris denuba obliterata Carpenter, 1928 - southern Sudan, Ethiopia

Torben Larsen developed a species numbering system for his 2005 publication Butterflies of West Africa. The nominate subspecies is #1233. The 'Larsen' numbers have since been used with permission in A Sharp Eye on Butterflies of Ghana.
