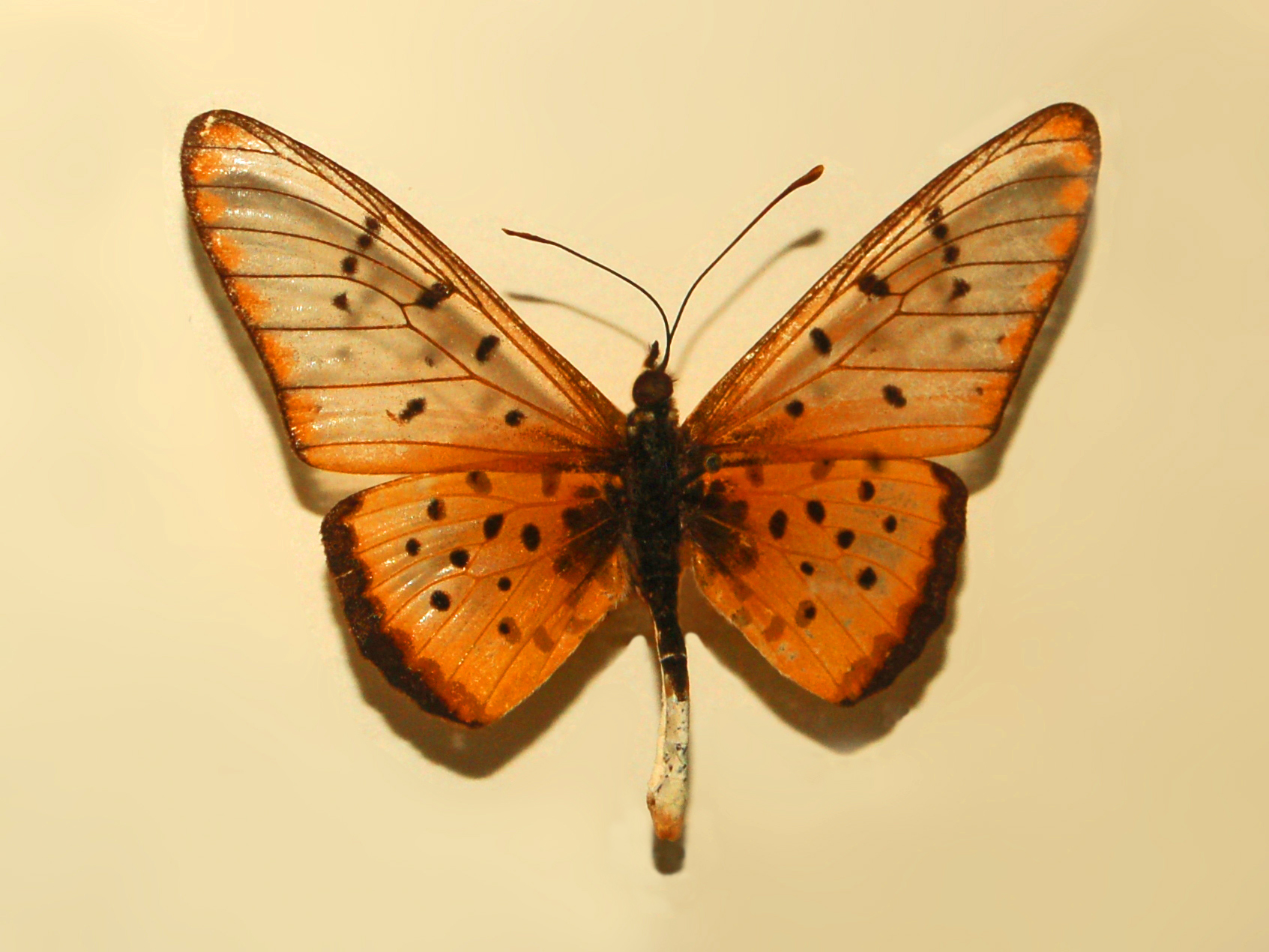

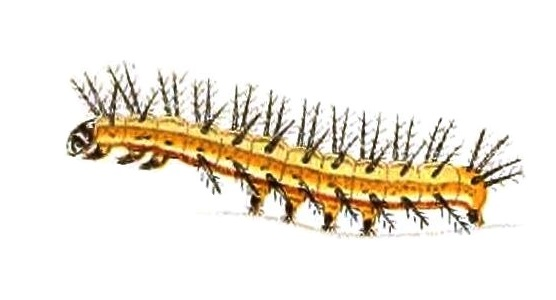
- Mounted specimen of an imago from Somalia, and a late instar larva from Lagos, Nigeria, in Eltringham (1912)

Scientific classification
- Kingdom: Animalia
- Phylum: Arthropoda
- Clade: Pancrustacea
- Class: Insecta
- Order: Lepidoptera
- Family: Nymphalidae
- Genus: Acraea
- Species: A. pseudegina

Binomial name
- Acraea pseudegina Westwood, 1852

Synonyms
- Acraea abadima Ribbe, 1889; Acraea clarei Neave, 1904; Acraea natalica pseudegina f. stephanophora Le Cerf, 1927; Acraea natalica abadima f. inexpectata Le Doux, 1931

= Acraea pseudegina =

Species of butterfly

Acraea pseudegina is a butterfly of the family Nymphalidae, which is native to the African tropics and subtropics.

== Description ==
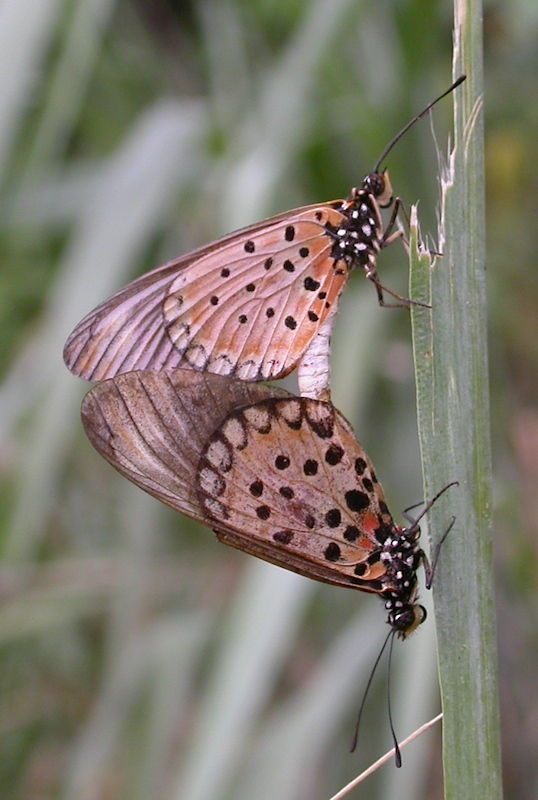
A pair mating, Benin

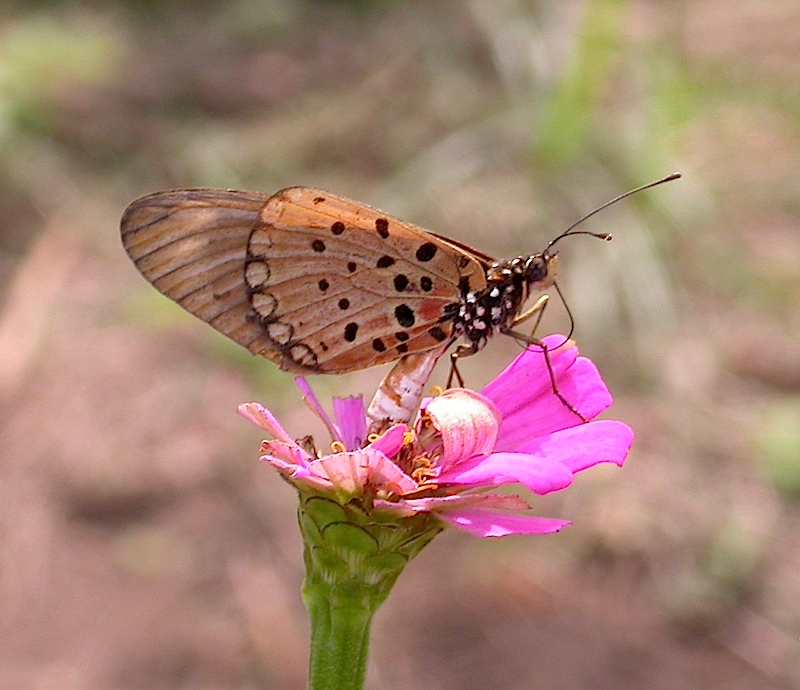
Imago, feeding in Benin

Acraea pseudegina has a wingspan reaching about 45–55 millimetres (1.8–2.2 in). In this quite variable species the uppersides of the forewings are usually smoky black, with some black spots. Fringes are black except on the inner margins of both wings where they are yellowish. The uppersides of the hindwings have brick-red colour. An irregular row of nine spots shown by transparency from the underside crosses the discal area of the wings. The underside is similar to the upperside, but there is a series of black marking on the edge of the hindwings. It is very similar to Acraea natalica qv.

Torben Larsen developed a species numbering system for his 2005 publication Butterflies of West Africa. This species is #1178. The 'Larsen' numbers have since been used with permission in A Sharp Eye on Butterflies of Ghana.

== Distribution ==
This species can be found in Senegal, Democratic Republic of the Congo, Nigeria, western Kenya, southern Ethiopia, Somalia and Angola.

== Biology ==
The larvae feed on Passiflora and Cephalomma species.

== Taxonomy ==
It is a member of the Acraea caecilia species group. See also Pierre & Bernaud, 2014
