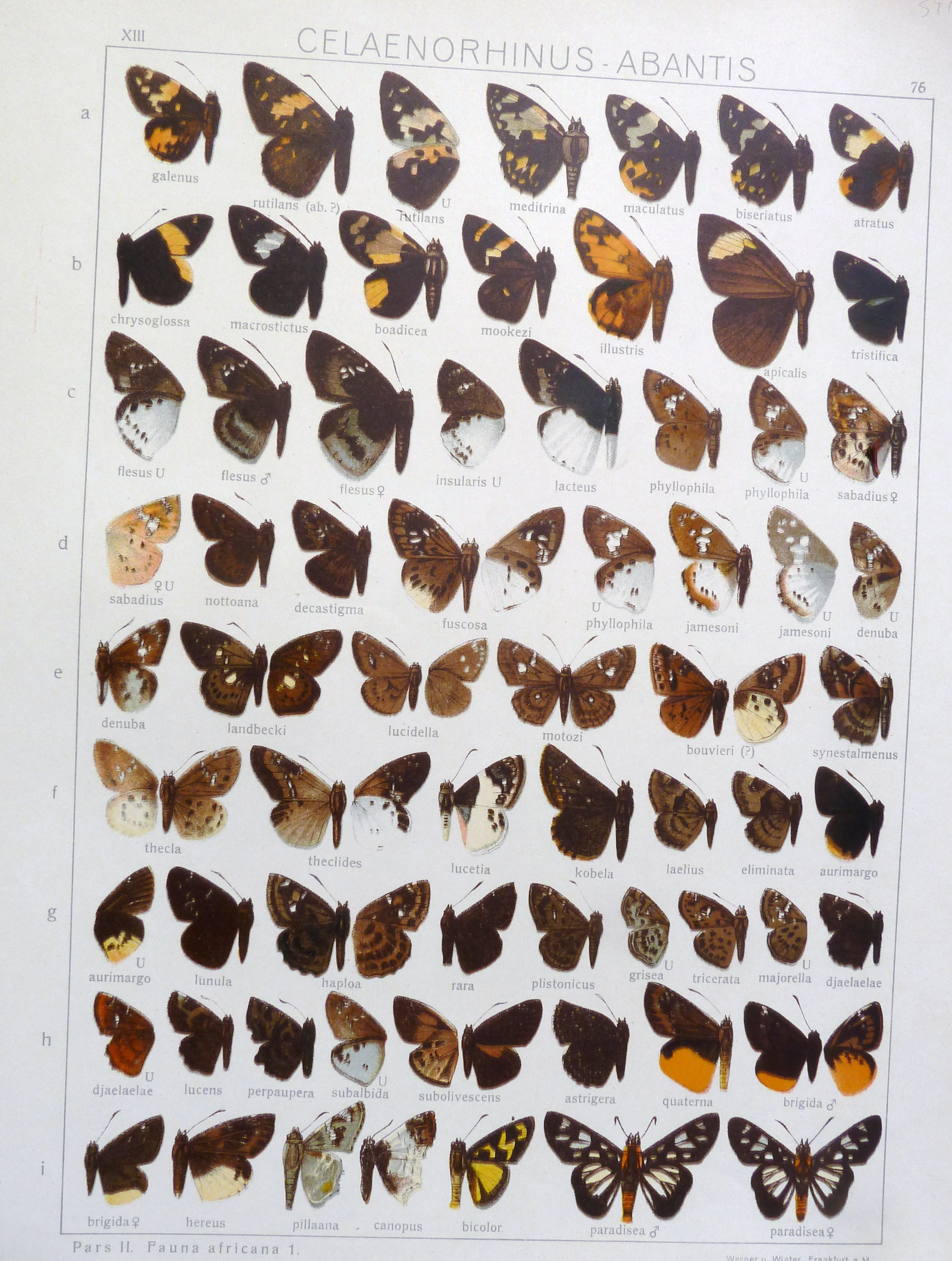
- As phyllophila Trimen, 1883 in Seitz c and nottoana d

Conservation status
- Least Concern (IUCN 3.1)

Scientific classification
- Kingdom: Animalia
- Phylum: Arthropoda
- Class: Insecta
- Order: Lepidoptera
- Family: Hesperiidae
- Genus: Eagris
- Species: E. nottoana

Binomial name
- Eagris nottoana (Wallengren, 1857)

Synonyms
- List: Pterygospidea nottoana Wallengren, 1857; Eagris melancholica Mabille, 1889; Nisoniades flavipalpis Plötz, 1884; Nisoniades phyllophyla Trimen, 1883

= Eagris nottoana =

Species of butterfly

Eagris nottoana, also known as the rufous-winged flat or rufous-winged elfin, is a species of butterfly in the family Hesperiidae. It is found from South Africa to Uganda, Kenya and Ethiopia, and on Madagascar.

The wingspan is 35–42 mm (1.4–1.7 in) for males and 39–43 mm (1.5–1.7 in) for females. Adults are on wing year-round in warmer areas with peaks in summer and autumn.

The larvae feed on Grewia occidentalis, Dombeya cymosa, Scutia commersoni, Scutia myrtina and Rinorea arborea.

== Subspecies ==
- Eagris nottoana nottoana - Ethiopia, Uganda, Kenya, Tanzania, Malawi, Zambia, Mozambique, Zimbabwe, Eswatini, South Africa: Limpopo Province, Mpumalanga, KwaZulu-Natal and the Eastern Cape Province
- Eagris nottoana knysna Evans, 1946 - from the western to the eastern Cape in coastal Afromontane forests
- Eagris nottoana smithii (Mabille, [1887]) - south-western Madagascar
