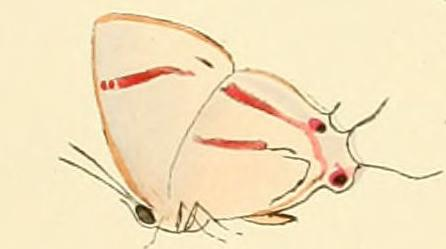

Conservation status
- Least Concern (IUCN 3.1)

Scientific classification
- Kingdom: Animalia
- Phylum: Arthropoda
- Class: Insecta
- Order: Lepidoptera
- Family: Lycaenidae
- Genus: Iolaus
- Species: I. sidus

Binomial name
- Iolaus sidus Trimen, 1864

Synonyms
- Epamera sidus (Trimen, 1864)

= Iolaus sidus =

Species of butterfly

Iolaus sidus, the red-line sapphire or red-line sapphire blue, is a butterfly of the family Lycaenidae. It is found from South Africa to Mozambique, Zambia, Zimbabwe and then to Kenya and Uganda. In South Africa it is found from the coastal woodland in the Eastern Cape to Tongaland and Bedford, the thorn belt of KwaZulu-Natal and then to Eswatini and Mpumalanga.

The wingspan is 28–31 mm for males and 29–32.5 mm for females. Adults are on wing year round with peaks in summer.

The larvae feed on Moquiniella rubra, Tieghemia quinquenervia, Tapinanthus oleifolius, Tapinanthus kraussianus, Tapinanthus brunneus and Tapinanthus subulatus.
