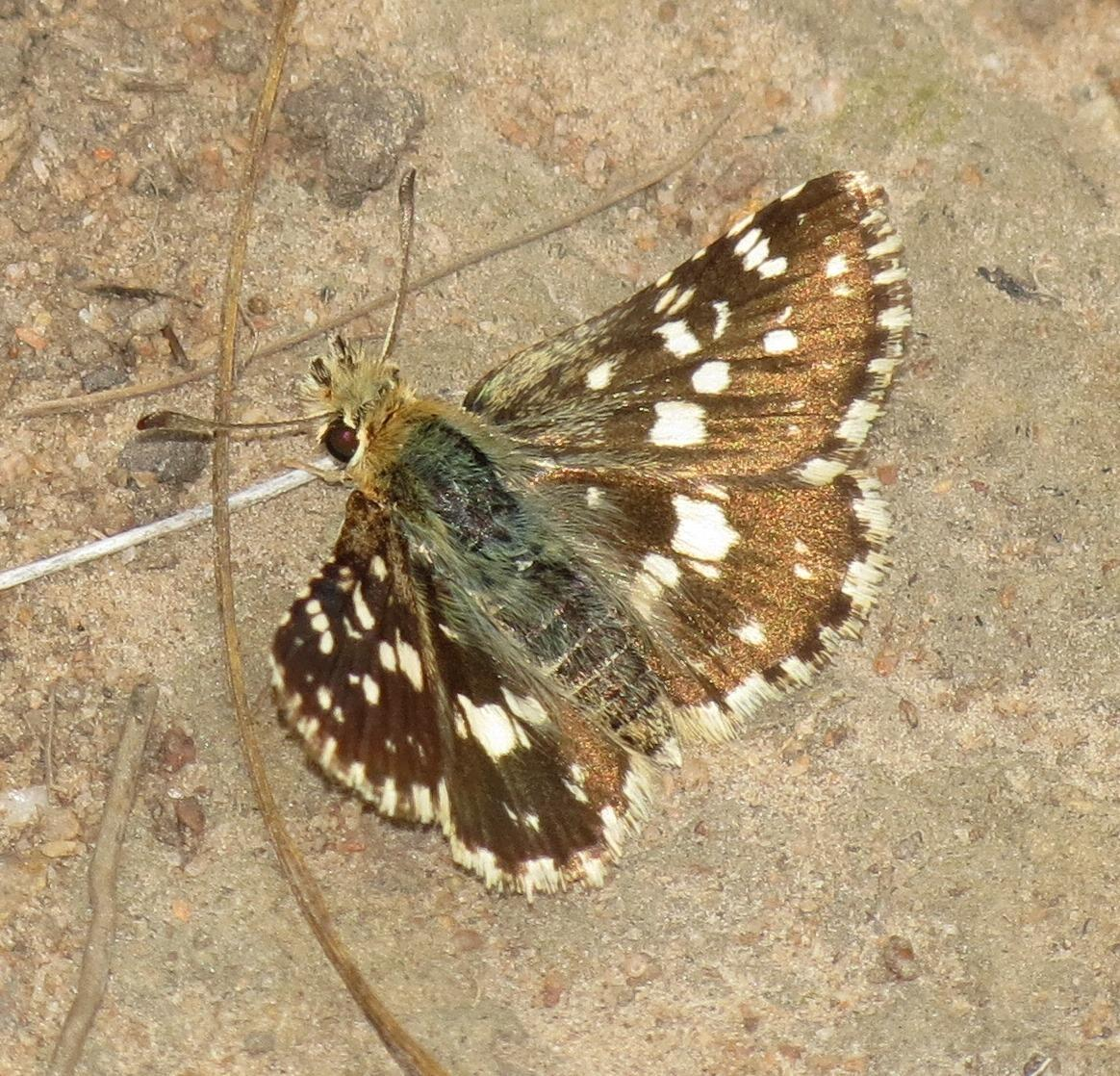
- Found in South Africa

Scientific classification
- Kingdom: Animalia
- Phylum: Arthropoda
- Class: Insecta
- Order: Lepidoptera
- Family: Hesperiidae
- Genus: Spialia
- Species: S. asterodia

Binomial name
- Spialia asterodia (Trimen, 1864)

Synonyms
- Pyrgus asterodia Trimen, 1864; Syrichtus asterodia

= Spialia asterodia =

Species of butterfly

Spialia asterodia, the star sandman or Asterodia sandman, is a butterfly of the family Hesperiidae. It is found in South Africa from the western Cape to the southern part of the north Cape and across the east Cape to Lesotho, the Free State, Eswatini, western KwaZulu-Natal, Mpumalanga, the Limpopo Province, the eastern North West Province and Gauteng. It is also present in southern Mozambique and Zimbabwe. The habitat consists of grassland and grassy areas in fynbos, Karoo and Bushveld.

The wingspan is 21–26 mm for males and 26–29 mm for females. Adults are on wing from August to March with peaks in midsummer. There are several generations per year.

The larvae feed on Hermannia diffusa, Hermannia incana, Pavonia burchelli and Hebiscus species.
