= Spialia confusa =

Confusing sandman

Scientific classification
- Domain: Eukaryota
- Kingdom: Animalia
- Phylum: Arthropoda
- Class: Insecta
- Order: Lepidoptera
- Family: Hesperiidae
- Genus: Spialia
- Species: S. confusa

Binomial name
- Spialia confusa (Higgins, 1925)

Synonyms
- Hesperia transvaaliae var. confusa Higgins, 1925; Hesperia transvaaliae var. fasciata Higgins, 1924; Hesperia transvaaliae var. obscura Higgins, 1924

Species of butterfly

Spialia confusa, the confusing sandman, is a butterfly of the family Hesperiidae. It is found in south-eastern Africa, from Zululand, Zimbabwe and Mozambique to Kenya.

The wingspan is 19–25 mm. Adults are on wing year-round with peaks from October to March.

The larvae feed on Melhania and Triumfetta species.

== Subspecies ==
- Spialia confusa confusa (central Tanzania, Malawi, northern Zambia, Mozambique, Zimbabwe, Eswatini, South Africa: Limpopo Province, Mpumalanga, KwaZulu-Natal)
- Spialia confusa obscura Evans, 1937 (eastern and central Kenya, north-eastern Tanzania)
