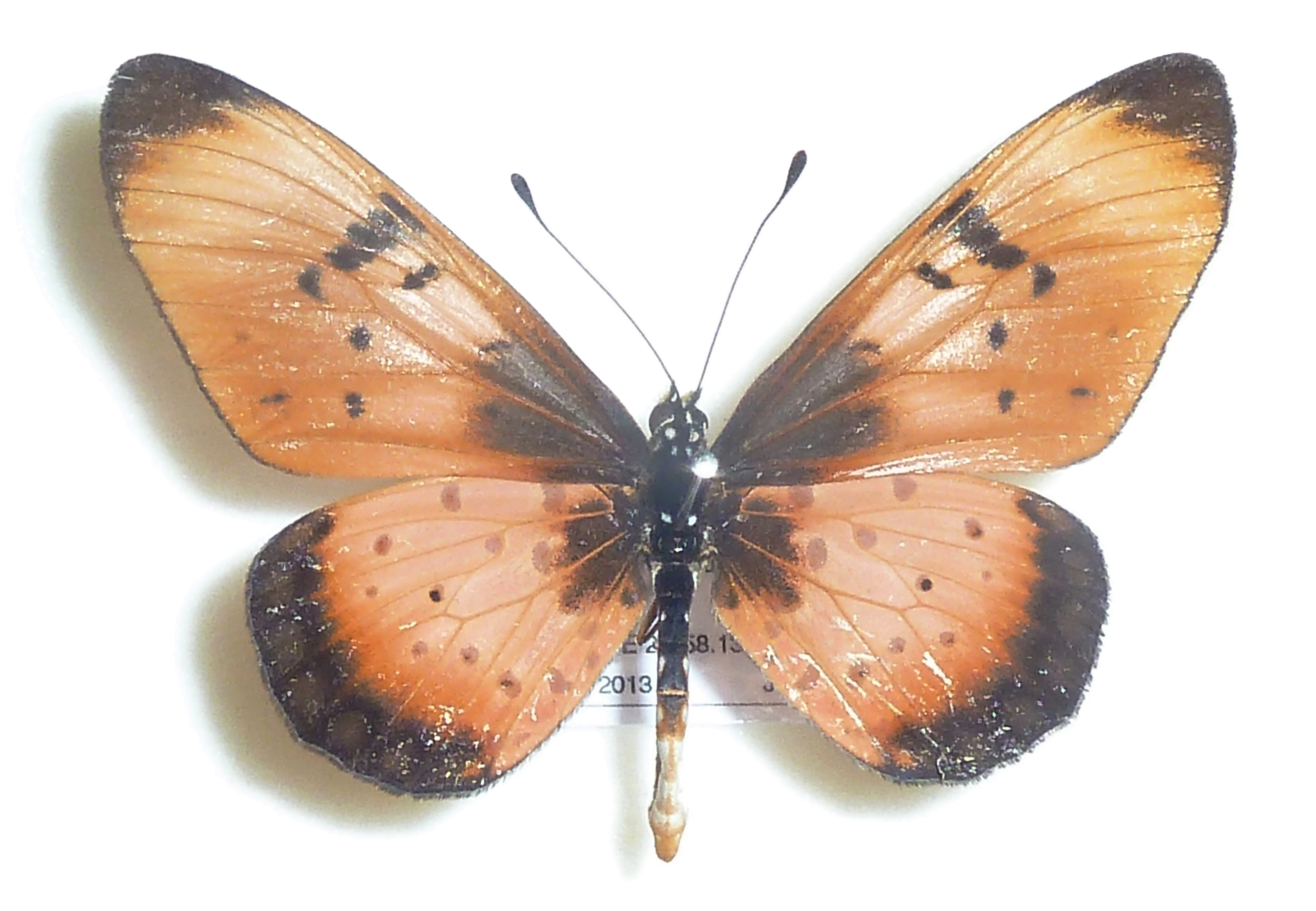
- Female imago – mounted specimen

Conservation status
- Least Concern (IUCN 3.1)

Scientific classification
- Kingdom: Animalia
- Phylum: Arthropoda
- Class: Insecta
- Order: Lepidoptera
- Family: Nymphalidae
- Genus: Acraea
- Species: A. natalica

Binomial name
- Acraea natalica Boisduval, 1847

Synonyms
- Acraea (Acraea) natalica; Acraea bellua Wallengren, 1857; Acraea natalica umbrata Suffert, 1904; Acraea natalica ab. albida Aurivillius, 1913; Acraea natalica f. mesoleuca Wichgraf, 1914; Acraea natalica pseudagina ab. dispar Schouteden, 1919; Acraea natalica natalica f. albiventris Le Doux, 1923; Acraea natalica natalica f. albata Le Doux, 1923; Acraea natalica var. oatesi van Son, 1936

= Acraea natalica =

Natal acraea

Species of butterfly

Acraea natalica, the Natal acraea, is a butterfly of the family Nymphalidae, which is native to East and southern Africa.

== Range ==
It is found from KwaZulu-Natal to Zimbabwe and in Mozambique, Malawi, Zambia, southern DRC (Katanga), Tanzania and eastern Kenya.

== Description ==
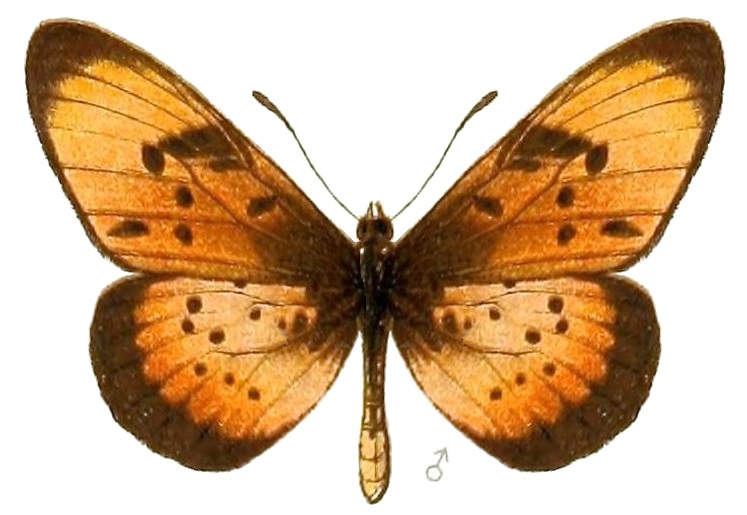
Male imago in Seitz (1925)

The wingspan is 55–65 mm. Adults are on wing year round, with a strong peak in late summer in southern Africa.
A. natalica Bdv. (55 f) varies greatly in size, but is on an average larger than the following species [in its subgroup], having an expanse of 46 to 80 mm. The ground-colour of the wings above is reddish to orange-yellow or brown- yellow and occasionally in the females on the hindwing much darkened, dark red-brown; both wings at the base blackish to about vein 2; the forewing with apical spot 4 to 5 mm. in breadth and black fringes, sometimes also with the veins narrowly black; a basal dot in the cell and in 1b at the outer edge of the black basal spot; discal dots 4 to 6, 9 and 10 united into a transverse streak placed almost vertically to the costal margin; submarginal dots in 1b to 3; hindwing with unspotted or indistinctly spotted black marginal band 4 to 5 mm. in breadth, which in the male is sharply defined, but in the female sometimes shades into the darkened ground-colour without sharp delimitation. Wings beneath lighter, not darkened at the base; forewing without dark apical spot; hind wing with bright red spots between the basal dots and between the discal dots and the marginal band at least in 1b to 3; the marginal band with large yellow marginal spots and always sharply defined proximally. South and East Africa to Angola, southern Congo and British East Africa.
Larva light yellow with white lateral line, white, black-edged dorsal line and a black streak on each side. Pupa yellowish white with black markings.

- umbrata Suff. differs in having on the fore wing immediately behind discal spots 4 to 6 a broad dark grey, somewhat transparent transverse band, extending from the costal margin to vein 3 and distally dentate at the veins; between this band and the dark apical spot four submarginal spots of the ground-colour are thus separated off in cellules 3 to 6. The marginal band of the hindwing above is narrower than in the type-form and irregularly defined proximally. Mozambique to British East Africa.
- female ab. albida ab. nov. approximates to the form umbrata, but has the ground-colour of the upper surface white and the marginal band on the upperside of the hindwing much widened, reaching the discal dots; wings beneath whitish yellow. Island of Pemba.
- abadima Ribbe (= clarei Neave) forms a transition between umbrata and pseudegina [now species including abadima Ribbe and clarei Neave]. Both wings above with bright orange-yellow ground-colour; it differs from umbrata in having the marginal band on the upperside of the hindwing a mere line or only indicated by some black scales and the marginal spots on the hindwing beneath very large and only separated by the veins; the grey subapical band of the fore wing is lighter, more transparent and more indistinctly defined. The female is darker and the ground-colour forms three whitish spots before the apex of the forewing. Angola to the Cameroons, Uganda and Abyssinia.
- pseudegina Westw. (55 f) [now species Acraea pseudegina ] is the north-western race and is distinguished from abadima by having the fore wing above entirely or for the most part blackish or black-grey. Senegal to Nigeria. Larva lighter than that of the type-form.

== Biology ==
The larvae feed on Adenia gummifera, Passiflora species (including P. coerulea) and Tricliceras longipedunculatum.

== Taxonomy ==
It is a member of the Acraea caecilia species group. See also Pierre & Bernaud, 2014

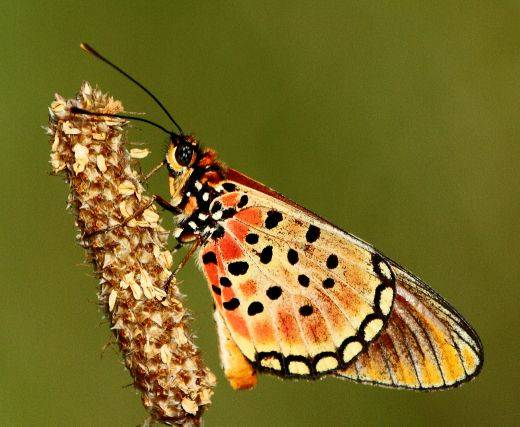
Underside of wings

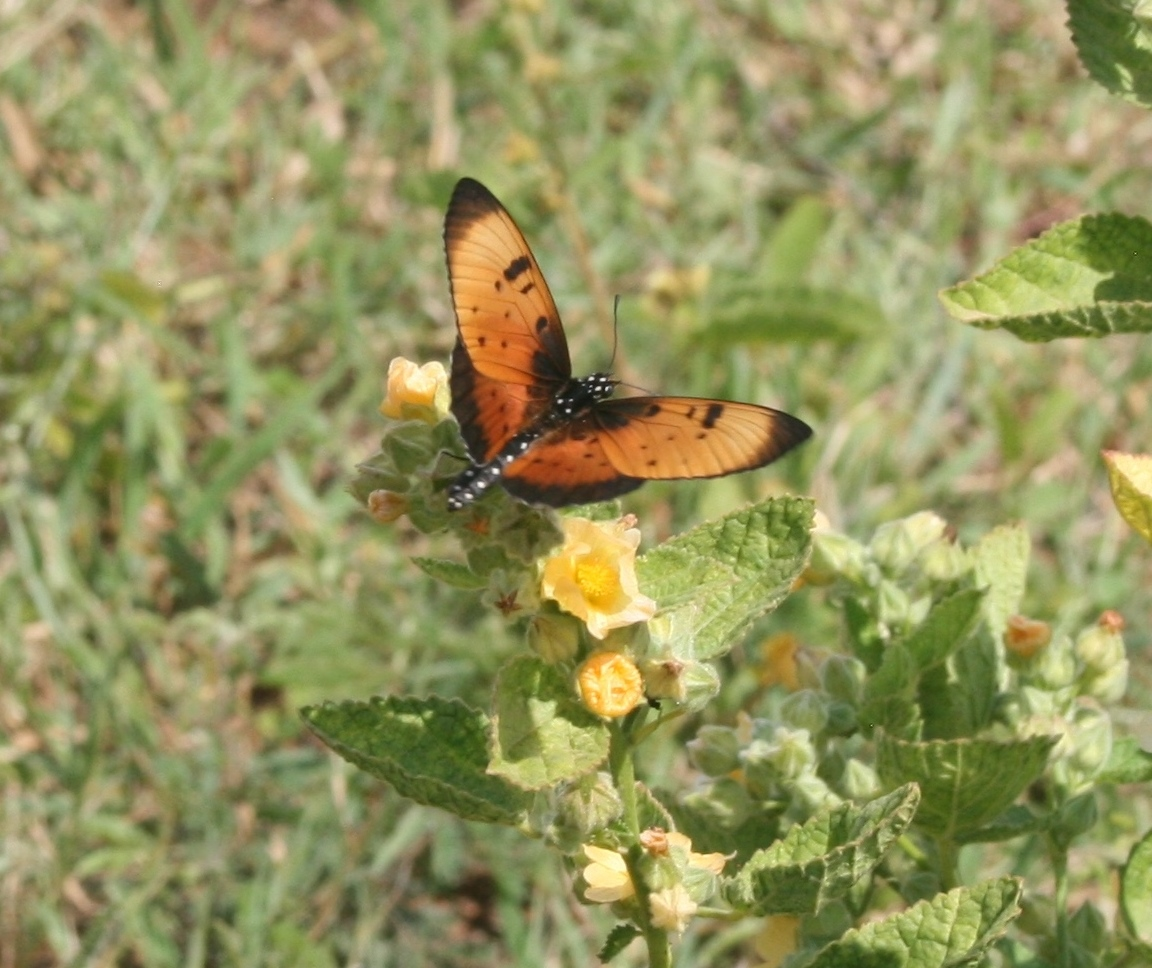
Female feeding on Sida nectar

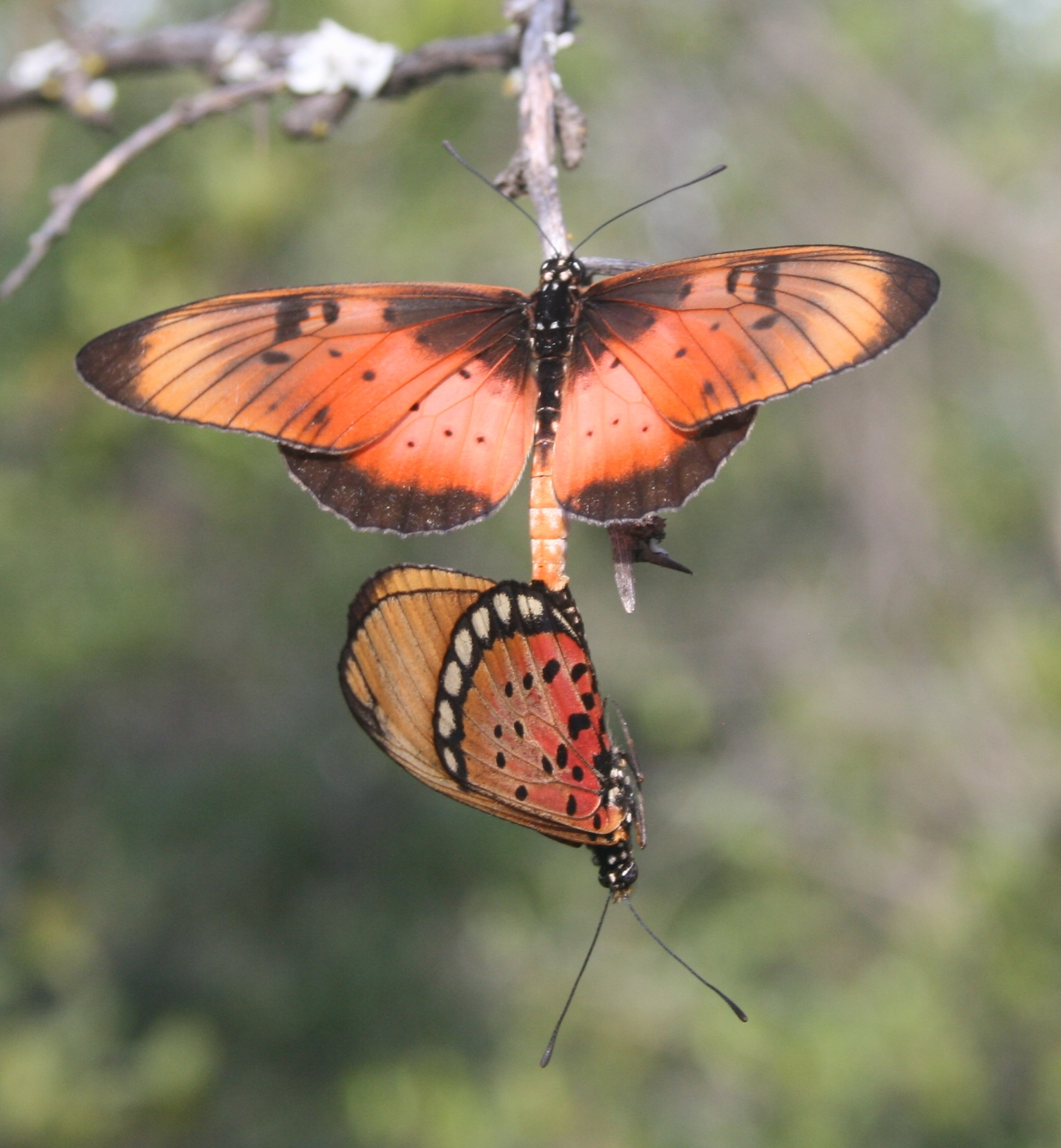
Mating pair in South Africa

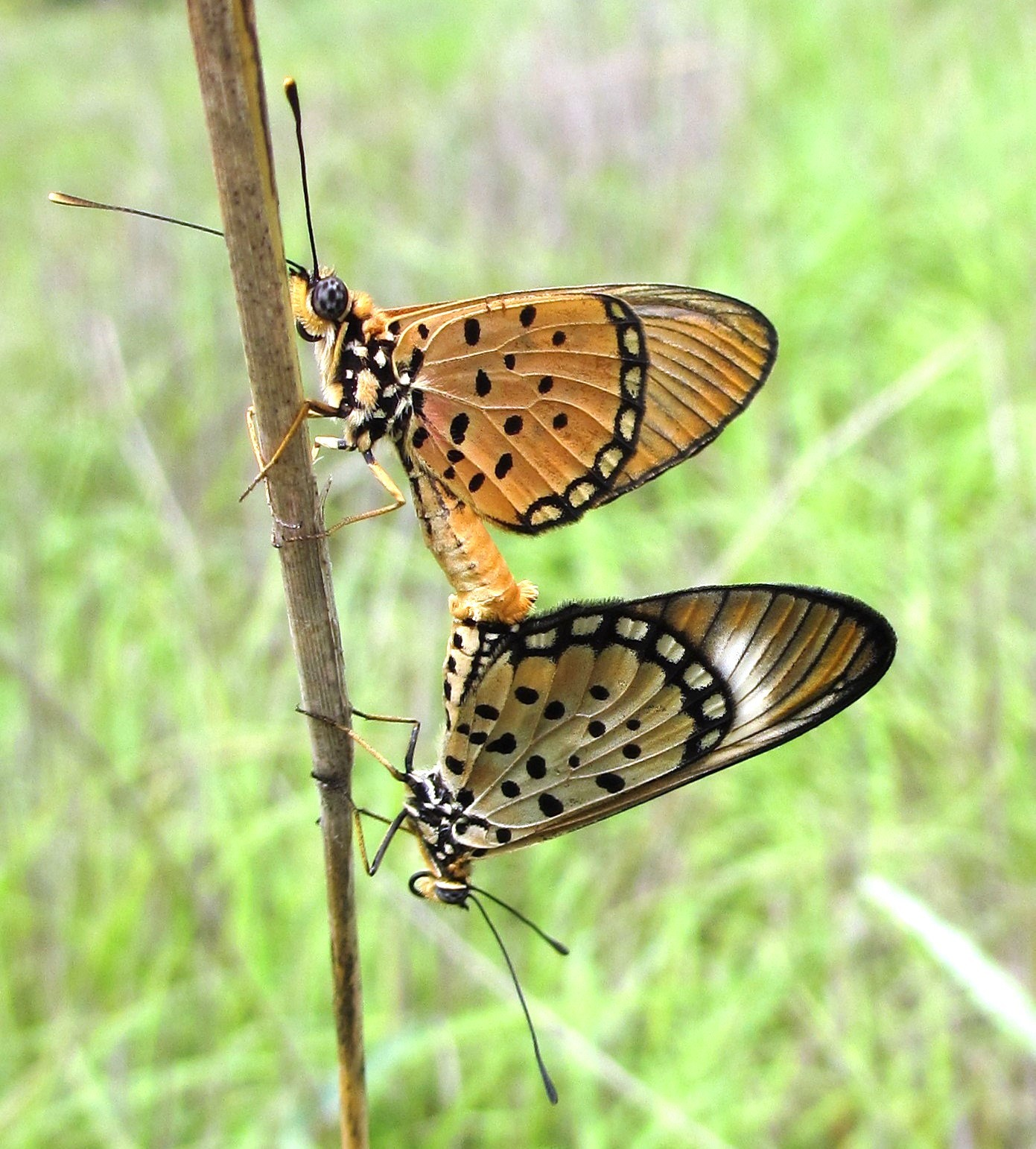
Mating pair in Mozambique
