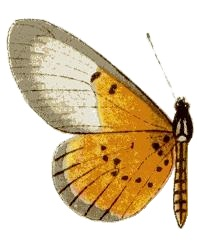

Scientific classification
- Kingdom: Animalia
- Phylum: Arthropoda
- Class: Insecta
- Order: Lepidoptera
- Family: Nymphalidae
- Genus: Acraea
- Species: A. cerasa

Binomial name
- Acraea cerasa Hewitson, 1861

Synonyms
- Hyalites cerasa (Hewitson, 1861); Acraea cerasa kigezia Howarth, 1959; Acraea unimaculata Grose-Smith, 1898

= Acraea cerasa =

Species of butterfly

Acraea cerasa, the tree top acraea, is a butterfly of the family Nymphalidae. It is found in most of south-eastern Africa.

== Description ==
A. cerasa Hew. (53 b). The red-yellow scaling of the forewing reaches the apex of the cell, is there bounded by a transverse streak and encloses a black dot in the cell and usually also, especially in the female, discal dots, at least in 1 b and 2. Hindwing red-yellow above with transparent marginal band, much narrowed in cellules lc and 2, fully developed discal dots and, especially in the usually also with submarginal dots at least in 1 c and 2. In the female the red-yellow colour is lighter red to light yellow. - Larva above reddish with greenish dorsal line and white dots on the dorsal line and at the lateral edge of the red colour, on the sides olive-green, beneath light green; head black; dorsal spines dark grey; on segments 3 to 6 longer, other spines yellowish to greenish white. Pupa light orange-yellow with black dots and lines. Natal to British East Africa. -A. cerita E. Sharpe (60 e). Of this species only one specimen is known [then]; it is very closely allied to cerasa and it need only be added to what has been given in the synopsis that the discal dots of the hindwing are small and in cellules 4 to 6 entirely absent. Uganda. -A. unimaculata Smith differs in having the black dots entirely absent on both wings except for 1 or 2 in the cell of the hindwing beneath. The forewing to vein 2 or 3, the hindwing to the marginal band, scaled with orange-yellow; apex of the cell of the forewing hyaline. British East Africa.

The wingspan is 32–38 mm for males and 37–45 mm for females.

== Subspecies ==
- Acraea cerasa cerasa – KwaZulu-Natal to Kenya east of Rift Valley
- Acraea cerasa cerita Sharpe, 1906 – Uganda and possibly north-western Tanzania and eastern DRC
- Acraea cerasa kiellandi Carcasson, 1964 – the highlands west of Lake Tanganyika
- Acraea cerasa unimaculata Grose-Smith, 1898 – the highlands west of the Rift Valley in Kenya

== Biology ==
Adults are on wing year round, with a peak from October to April. It is very scarce in dry months. The larvae feed on Rawsonia lucida and Drypetes gerrardii.

== Taxonomy ==
See Pierre & Bernaud, 2014
