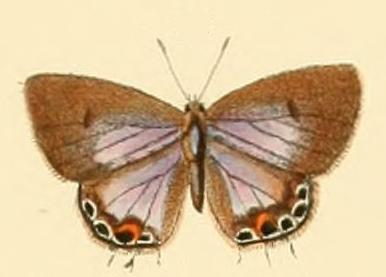

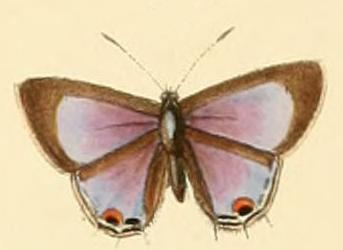

Conservation status
- Least Concern (IUCN 3.1)

Scientific classification
- Kingdom: Animalia
- Phylum: Arthropoda
- Class: Insecta
- Order: Lepidoptera
- Family: Lycaenidae
- Genus: Anthene
- Species: A. otacilia

Binomial name
- Anthene otacilia (Trimen, 1868)

Synonyms
- Lycaena otacilia Trimen, 1868; Lycaenesthes otacilia; Azanus tongidensis Bethune-Baker, 1926; Anthene otacilia benadirensis Stempffer, 1947

= Anthene otacilia =

Otacilia hairtail

Species of butterfly

Anthene otacilia, the Otacilia hairtail or Trimen's ciliate blue, is a butterfly of the family Lycaenidae, found in Africa.

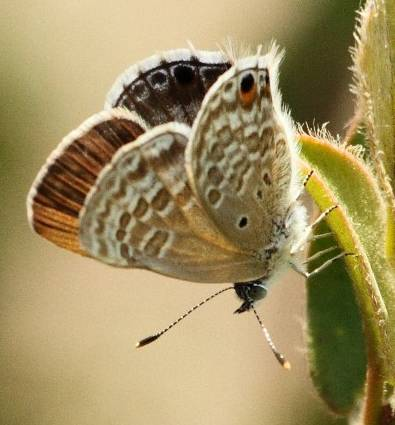
Near Qudeni, KwaZulu-Natal

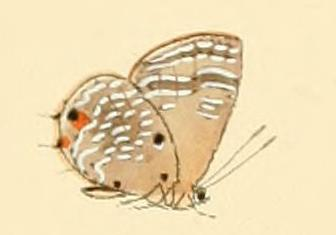

The wingspan is about 22–23 mm in males and 23–24 mm in females.

The flight period is from September to May peaking in November and March.

The larvae feed on Acacia species.

== Subspecies ==
- Anthene otacilia otacilia (Democratic Republic of the Congo: North Kivu, Tanzania, Malawi, eastern Zambia, Mozambique, Zimbabwe, northern Namibia, Eswatini, South Africa: Limpopo Province, Mpumalanga, North West Province, Gauteng, KwaZulu-Natal, Eastern Cape Province and Western Cape Province)
- Anthene otacilia dulcis (Pagenstecher, 1902) (Ethiopia, Somalia, coast of Kenya)
