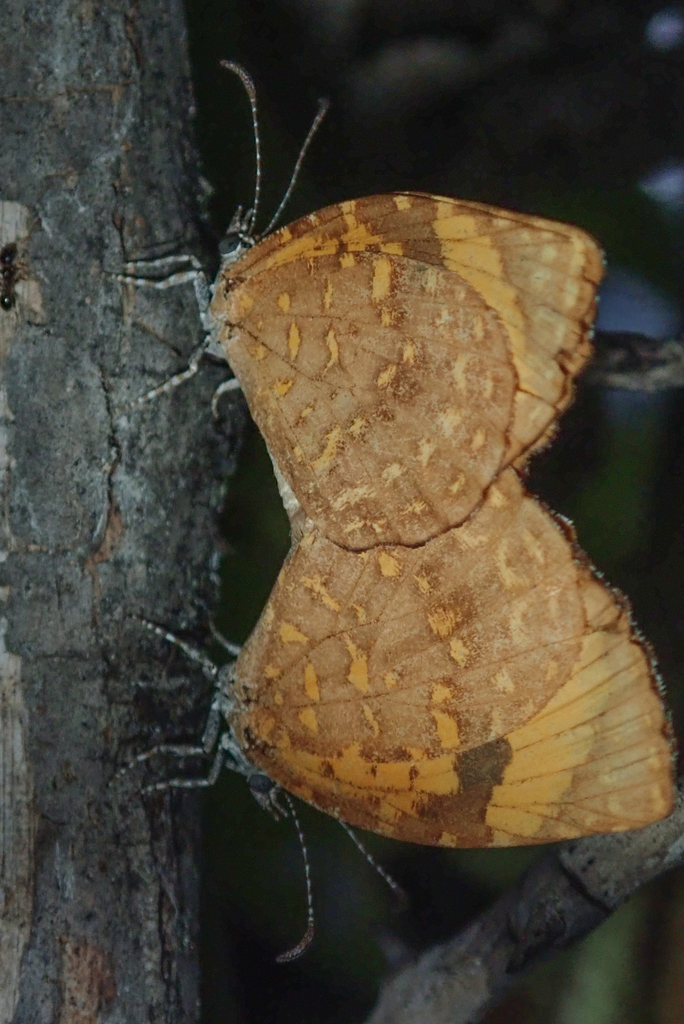

Scientific classification
- Kingdom: Animalia
- Phylum: Arthropoda
- Class: Insecta
- Order: Lepidoptera
- Family: Lycaenidae
- Genus: Cnodontes
- Species: C. pallida

Binomial name
- Cnodontes pallida (Trimen, 1898)

Synonyms
- Durbania pallida Trimen, 1898

= Cnodontes pallida =

Species of insect

Cnodontes pallida, the pale buff, is a butterfly in the family Lycaenidae. It is found in Zimbabwe, Zambia (the Zambezi and Luangwa valleys), Botswana, northern Namibia, Mozambique, Eswatini and possibly South Africa (Limpopo). Its habitat consists of open savanna.

Adults are on wing from July to September and in December, March and April.
