= Anthene kersteni =

Conservation status
- Least Concern (IUCN 3.1)

Scientific classification
- Kingdom: Animalia
- Phylum: Arthropoda
- Class: Insecta
- Order: Lepidoptera
- Family: Lycaenidae
- Genus: Anthene
- Species: A. kersteni

Binomial name
- Anthene kersteni (Gerstaecker, 1871)

Synonyms
- Lycaena kersteni Gerstaecker, 1871

Species of butterfly

Anthene kersteni, the Kersten's hairtail or Kersten's ciliate blue, is a butterfly of the family Lycaenidae. It is found from South Africa to Kenya, Uganda, and Ethiopia. In South Africa it is found in coastal lowland forest in KwaZulu-Natal, from the coast to Kosi Bay, inland across the Makathini Flats.

The wingspan is 26–28 mm for males and 23–29 mm for females. Adults are on wing year-round, with a peak in summer.

The larvae feed on Acacia species, including and Acacia kraussiana and Albizia adianthifolia.
