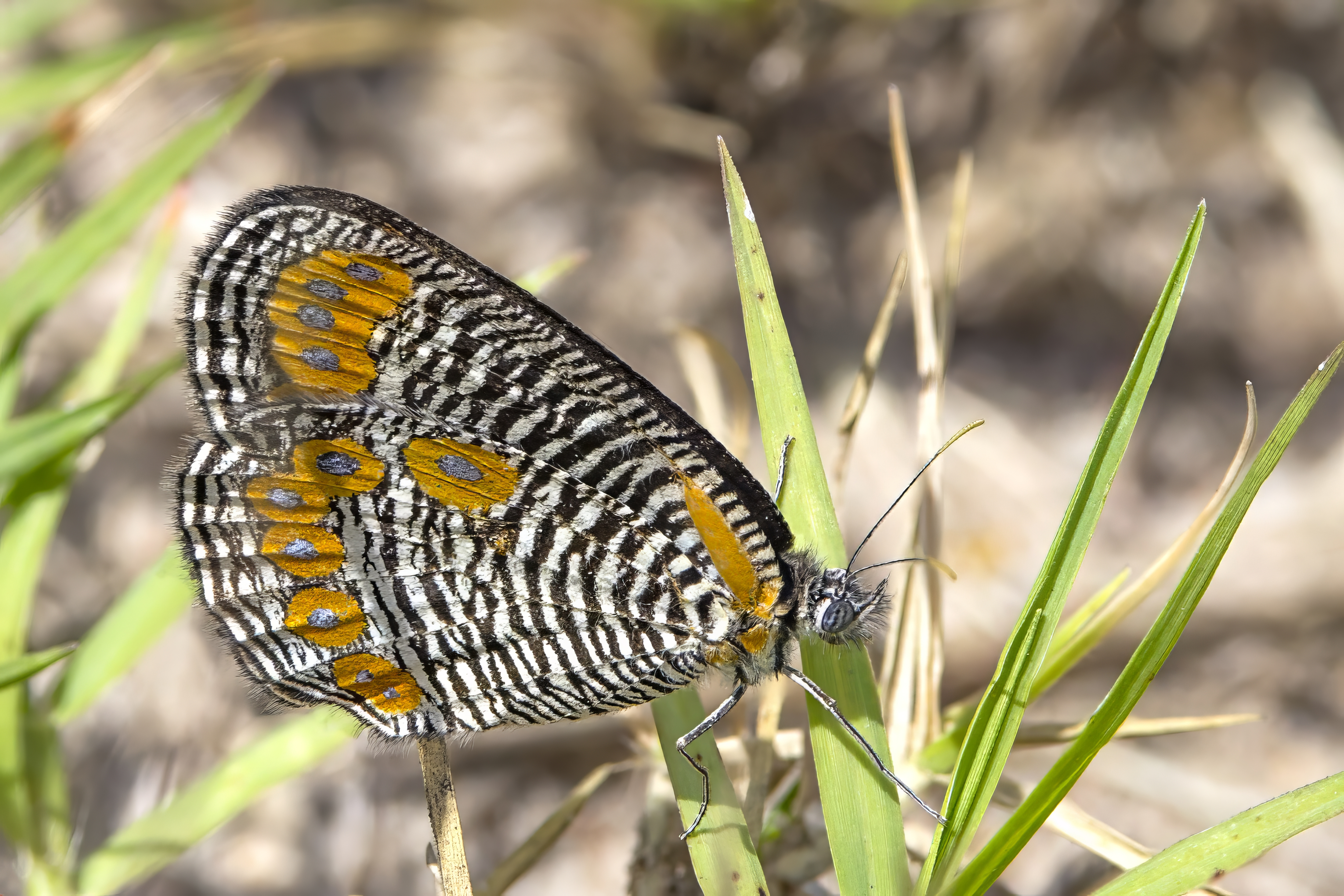
- Kruger National Park, South Africa

Scientific classification
- Domain: Eukaryota
- Kingdom: Animalia
- Phylum: Arthropoda
- Class: Insecta
- Order: Lepidoptera
- Family: Nymphalidae
- Genus: Physcaeneura
- Species: P. panda

Binomial name
- Physcaeneura panda (Boisduval, 1847)

Synonyms
- Satyrys panda Boisduval, 1847

= Physcaeneura panda =

Species of butterfly

Physcaeneura panda, the dark-webbed ringlet, is a butterfly of the family Nymphalidae. It is found in South Africa, it is common and widespread in the hot dry savanna of KwaZulu-Natal, Eswatini, Mpumalanga, Gauteng, Limpopo and North West.

The wingspan is 34–38 mm for males and 35–39 mm for females. Adults are on wing from September to May (with a peak in late summer).

The larvae probably feed on Poaceae species. Larvae have been reared on Ehrharta erecta and Pennisetum clandestinum.
