= Cnodontes penningtoni =

Scientific classification
- Domain: Eukaryota
- Kingdom: Animalia
- Phylum: Arthropoda
- Class: Insecta
- Order: Lepidoptera
- Family: Lycaenidae
- Genus: Cnodontes
- Species: C. penningtoni

Binomial name
- Cnodontes penningtoni Bennett, 1954

Synonyms
- Cnodontes vansoni Stempffer and Bennett, 1956

Species of butterfly

Cnodontes penningtoni, the Pennington's buff, is a butterfly of the family Lycaenidae. It is found in Eswatini, Transvaal, Botswana, south-west Africa and Mozambique.

The wingspan is 23–27 mm for males and 24–29 mm for females. Adults are on wing from August to October and from February to April. There are two generations per year.

The larvae possibly feed on cyanobacteria species.
