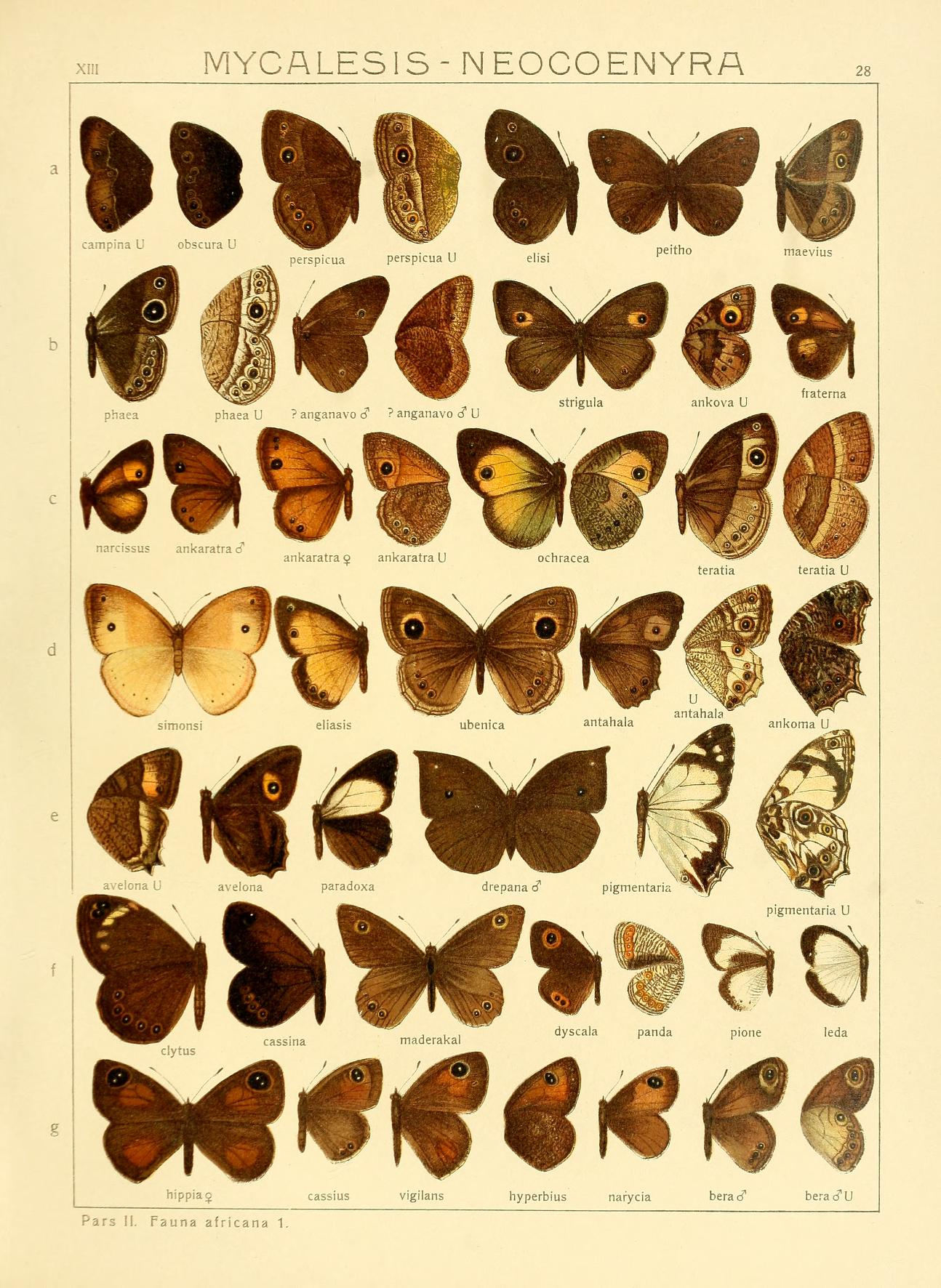
- In Adalbert Seitz's Fauna Africana

Scientific classification
- Domain: Eukaryota
- Kingdom: Animalia
- Phylum: Arthropoda
- Class: Insecta
- Order: Lepidoptera
- Family: Nymphalidae
- Genus: Cassionympha
- Species: C. cassius

Binomial name
- Cassionympha cassius (Godart, [1824])

Synonyms
- Satyrus cassius Godart, [1824]; Pseudonympha hyperbioides Wallengren, 1857

= Cassionympha cassius =

Rainforest brown

Species of butterfly

Cassionympha cassius, the rainforest brown, is a butterfly of the family Nymphalidae. It is found in South Africa, it is common in cool and moist forests, coastal and riverine bush and kloofs (gorges in the Western Cape along the western coast through the Eastern Cape to KwaZulu-Natal, the eastern slopes of the escarpment through Eswatini and Mpumalanga to the Soutpansberg in Limpopo.

The wingspan is 34–38 mm for males and 36–42 mm for females. Adults are on wing from September to May.

The larvae feed on Poaceae species, including Pentaschistis capensis and Juncus capensis.
