= Lepidochrysops ignota =

Conservation status
- Least Concern (IUCN 3.1)

Scientific classification
- Kingdom: Animalia
- Phylum: Arthropoda
- Class: Insecta
- Order: Lepidoptera
- Family: Lycaenidae
- Genus: Lepidochrysops
- Species: L. ignota

Binomial name
- Lepidochrysops ignota (Trimen, 1887)

Synonyms
- Lycaena ignota Trimen, 1887; Cupido ignotus; Catochrysops ignota; Neochrysops ignota; Lepidochrysops ignota f. fortuna Woodhall, 2000

Species of butterfly

Lepidochrysops ignota, the Zulu blue, is a butterfly of the family Lycaenidae. It is found in South Africa, from the KwaZulu-Natal midlands to Eswatini, Mpumalanga, Limpopo and Gauteng.

The wingspan is 27–29 mm for males and 27–30 mm for females. Adults are on wing from October to November. There is one generation per year.

The larvae feed on Ocimum species. Third and later instar larvae feed on the brood of Camponotus niveosetus ants.
