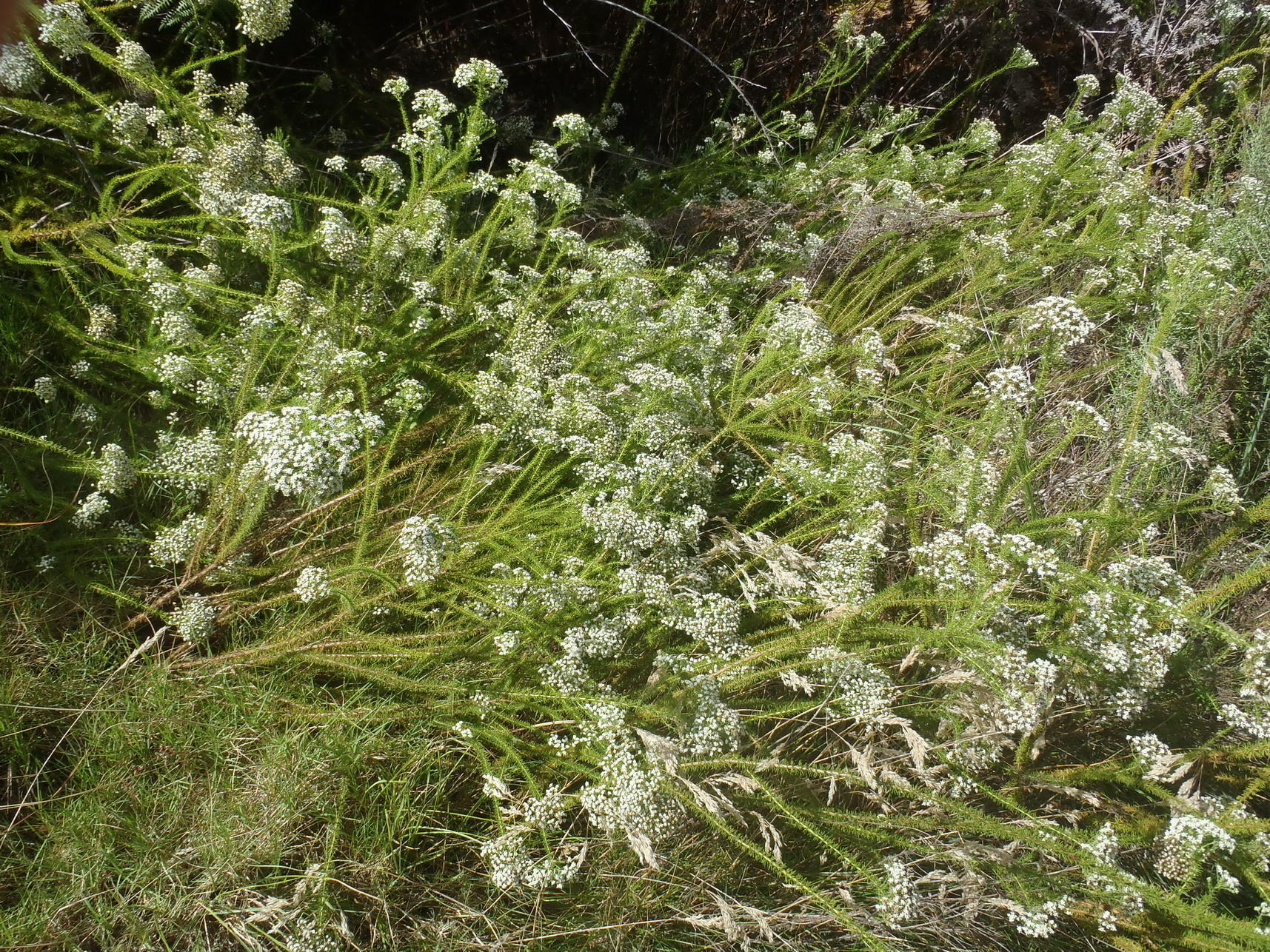

Scientific classification
- Kingdom: Plantae
- Clade: Embryophytes
- Clade: Tracheophytes
- Clade: Angiosperms
- Clade: Eudicots
- Clade: Asterids
- Order: Lamiales
- Family: Scrophulariaceae
- Genus: Selago
- Species: S. corymbosa

Binomial name
- Selago corymbosa L.

= Selago corymbosa =

Species of flowering plant

Selago corymbosa is a species of plant in the family Scrophulariaceae. It is endemic to South Africa.

== Description ==
A perennial, woody, loosely-branching shrublet. One of a group of southern African Selago species (including Selago dolosa, Selago punctata, and Selago variicalyx) that have fascicled leaves, pubescent stems, and an inflorescence that is a corymbose panicle.

Selago corymbosa is frequently confused with the related species Selago dolosa, but can be distinguished by the following characters:

- The leaves of S. corymbosa are narrower (length:width ratio 10-24 : 1 rather than 2.5-7 : 1), longer (5-12mm rather than 2-7mm), and more glandular-hairy. The S. corymbosa leaves also have a raised midrib blow and margins that recurve when dry.
- The bracts of S. corymbosa are also narrower (0.4-0.7mm rather than 0.7-1.25mm).

== Distribution ==
Selago corymbosa is mainly confined to the southern Cape regions of South Africa, where it favours grassy scrub vegetation mainly around the coastal lowlands, but also spreads in disturbed areas.

In the west it is common around the Cape Peninsula, Somerset West, Stellenbosch and Paarl, northwards to the area around Ceres. Its eastern populations occur approximately between Knysna and Humansdorp.

In the area between these two populations, i.e., between Somerset West in the west, and George/Knysna in the east, an intermediate form of Selago dolosa occurs, that shows some morphological influence of Selago corymbosa.
