= 2026 Parliamentary Investigation into the Chikangawa plane crash =

2026 Malawian investigation into the 2024 Chikangawa plane crash

The 2026 Parliamentary Investigation into the Chikangawa plane crash is a Malawian government-mandated review ordered in February 2026 to revisit the circumstances of the 10 June 2024 military aircraft accident that killed former Vice-president Saulos Chilima and eight others. The decision followed a review by the Minister of Justice and Constitutional Affairs Charles Mhango, who reported to Parliament that earlier inquiries, including the 2024 commission of inquiry and the two assessments conducted by German aviation experts, had left key questions unanswered. Parliament was directed to appoint an ad hoc committee, supported by international aviation experts, to carry out the new investigation.

== Background ==
On 10 June 2024, a Malawian Defence Force Dornier 228 aircraft carrying Vice-president Saulos Chilima, former First Lady Patricia Shanil Muluzi, and seven others crashed in Nthungwa, Chikangawa Forest Reserve in Nkhata Bay District while en route from Lilongwe to Mzuzu to attend a funeral, killing all nine occupants. The accident was Malawi's deadliest aviation incident and drew national shock and public concern over aviation safety and the loss of the vice-president.

Initial investigations from the German Federal Bureau of Aircraft Accident Investigation found that the crew continued flying at low altitude in marginal weather conditions, leading to loss of situational awareness and controlled flight into terrain. The report also highlighted systemic issues such as inadequate weather briefing procedures, expired emergency locator transmitter batteries, and lack of flight data and cockpit voice recorders. A separate Commission of Inquiry established by the government concluded in December 2024 that there was no evidence of foul play, attributing the accident to human and environmental factors including adverse weather.

Despite these official findings, sections of the public, religious leaders, political parties, and civil society questioned whether the full circumstances had been brought to light. Calls for further investigation were driven by concerns that earlier reports had left unanswered questions about aviation safety standards, maintenance lapses, and the circumstances surrounding the crash, leading to sustained pressure on successive governments to revisit the matter.

== Establishment ==
On 19 March, Speaker of the National Assembly Sameer Suleman announced the formation of a 13-member ad hoc parliamentary committee to conduct the investigation. The committee was to be composed proportionally from political parties represented in Parliament, including four members from the Democratic Progressive Party, three from the Malawi Congress Party, three independent members, and one member each from the United Transformation Movement, United Democratic Front, and People's Party. The Speaker requested party whips to submit nominations for the committee's membership.

== Members ==
On 26 March, Speaker of the National Assembly announced the initial list of twelve members selected to serve on the ad hoc parliamentary committee investigating the 2024 Chikangawa plane crash. The members were drawn from several political parties and independent legislators represented in Parliament. One proposed member from the Malawi Congress Party, Monica Chang'anamuno was not included because she had served as Minister of Defence in the previous administration, and the Speaker requested the party to nominate a replacement.

Following the announcement, Malawi Congress Party expressed concerns over the balance of the committee, arguing that most members were aligned with the governing side. Leader of opposition Simplex Chithyola Banda subsequently announced that the party would withdraw from participating in the inquiry. The Speaker later reconstituted the panel to address the concerns, after which the MCP reversed its decision and agreed to participate in the inquiry when the revised committee membership was announced.

On 30 March, the Speaker announced that Walter Nyamilandu had been selected as chairperson of the committee, with James Mpunga appointed as his deputy.

Members of the Committee
Position	Name	Party
Chairperson	Walter Nyamilandu	Independent
Deputy Chairperson	James Mpunga	Democratic Progressive Party
Member	Gilbert Khonyongwa	Democratic Progressive Party
Member	Chipalamoto Nkhwazi	Democratic Progressive Party
Member	Dumisani Lindani	Democratic Progressive Party
Member	Joshua Malango	Malawi Congress Party
Member	Jiverson Kadzipatike	Malawi Congress Party
Member	Mphatso Boti	Malawi Congress Party
Member	Savwell Kafwafwa	Independent
Member	Dailes Moses Bengo	Independent
Member	Felix Njawala	United Transformation Movement
Member	Ishmael Rizziq Mkumba	United Democratic Front
Member	Beatrice Mwale	People's Party

== Reactions ==
Following the announcement of the new parliamentary investigation, several individuals and groups publicly reacted to the decision. Mary Chilima, the widow of former vice-president Saulos Chilima, welcomed the move and thanked President Peter Mutharika for ordering a fresh inquiry into the crash. In a post published on her social media page, on 24 February 2026, she expressed appreciation for the government's decision to revisit the circumstances surrounding the accident.

On 15 April, civil rights activist Sylvester Namiwa called for greater transparency in the investigation, urging that it be conducted publicly and that witnesses, including former president Lazarus Chakwera, testify in open hearings. He stated that previous inquiries had left significant gaps.
