= Commission of Inquiry into the 2024 Chikangawa (Nthungwa) aircraft accident =

Malawian public inquiry

- Date: 25 October – 14 December 2024
- Location: Lilongwe, Malawi
- Participants: Justice Jabbar Alide (chairperson)

The Commission of Inquiry into the 2024 Chikangawa (Nthungwa) aircraft accident was a government-appointed body established by President Lazarus Chakwera in October 2024. Its purpose was to investigate the military aircraft crash of 10 June 2024 in Nthungwa, Chikangawa Forest in Nkhata Bay, which killed Malawi's Vice-President Saulos Chilima, former First Lady Patricia Shanil Muluzi, and seven others.

== Establishment and mandate ==
The commission was constituted under Malawi's Commissions of Inquiry Act and sworn in at Kamuzu Palace in Lilongwe on 25 October 2024. It was chaired by Justice Jabbar Alide. Its mandate was to examine the circumstances of the crash involving Malawi Defence Force aircraft MAF-T03, determine causal and contributory factors, and recommend measures to prevent similar incidents in the future.

== Public pressure before establishment of Inquiry ==
From soon after the crash, there was significant public pressure for a formal investigation. Former Attorney General Chikosa Silungwe called for a state-led inquiry during the state funeral for Saulos Chilima on 16 June 2024. The widow of Chilima, Mary Nkhamanyachi Chilima, also publicly urged for a commission of inquiry. On 29 September 2024, she made a post on her social media page asking Malawians to help her in calling for a special investigation into the crash, especially for clarity about what happened between 10 and 11 June.

Civil society organisations and NGOs supported these calls. For instance, the Human Rights Defenders Coalition (HRDC), Centre for Democracy and Economic Development Initiatives (CDEDI), and others backed Mary Chilima's request for an independent probe. Some parties threatened demonstrations. CDEDI gave an ultimatum to the government in October 2024 to establish a commission of inquiry.

Despite those calls, the government did not formally establish the Commission of Inquiry until late October 2024.

== Membership and resignations ==
The Commission initially had 19 members drawn from various professional and civic backgrounds. Soon after its establishment, activist Sylvester Namiwa withdrew, citing concerns over transparency and the decision to conduct some proceedings in camera. Pastor Tony Nyirenda also resigned later for personal reasons, reducing the number of members to 17.

== Findings ==
The Commission completed its work in December 2024 and submitted its report to the President. The summary released to the public stated that there was no evidence of foul play in the crash. Instead, it identified a combination of human and environmental factors, including poor weather conditions and decision-making under pressure, as key contributors. The report recommended improvements in military aviation procedures, safety protocols, and disaster response mechanisms.

== Requests for fresh inquiry ==
In December 2024, shortly after the public summary of the commission's findings was released, Archbishop Thomas Luke Msusa publicly expressed dissatisfaction with the report, stating during his Christmas Eve Mass that “the truth on the Chilima plane crash has not been told” and that he was not satisfied with the official findings. Around the same period, civil society actors such as CDEDI and human rights defenders also criticised the limited transparency in the commission's release, demanding that the full report be made publicly accessible.

After the 2025 general election and the change in government, political entities renewed and amplified calls for a fresh and independent inquiry. For instance, the People's Voice Party (PVP) publicly urged the newly elected administration to initiate a new investigation into the crash, arguing that the earlier inquiry left many questions unanswered and that Malawians deserved a transparent, credible probe. In November 2025, Patricia Kaliati, Leader of Parliament for the United Transformation Movement, publicly urged the government to launch a new investigation into the aircraft accident. Kaliati noted that despite the earlier commission’s work, “Malawians remain unsatisfied” and called for accountability and clarity over the loss of key figures. On 6 November, Eisenhower Mkaka, a senior member and former Secretary-General of the Malawi Congress Party, publicly backed calls for a fresh investigation into the accident. He said Malawians deserved the truth about what happened and supported demands for a new inquiry to provide clarity.

In November 2025, Minister of Justice and Constitutional Affairs, Charles Mhango, confirmed that the new administration was reviewing not only the 2024 commission of inquiry report into the 10 June aircraft accident, but also the two assessments conducted by German aviation experts. He stated that the government would determine the way forward, whether there was more that needed to be done. In February 2026, he told Parliament that President Peter Mutharika had ordered a fresh investigation into the accident. Unlike the previous inquiry, the new probe was to be conducted by a parliamentary committee with support from international aviation experts, following gaps identified in earlier reports including those by German investigators and the 2024 commission.

Following sustained pressure from political parties, civil society organisations, and sections of the public, the government proceeded with a fresh investigation into the 10 June 2024 aircraft accident. In February 2026, a new inquiry was formally initiated through an ad hoc parliamentary committee composed of members from multiple political parties, marking a departure from the earlier commission-based process.

== See also ==
- 2024 Chikangawa Dornier 228 crash
- 2026 Parliamentary Investigation into the Chikangawa plane crash
