= Chikangawa =

Town in Mzimba District, Malawi

Chikangawa, Mzimba
- Location within Malawi
- Coordinates: 11°52′16″S 33°48′0″E
- Country: Malawi
- Region: Northern Region, Malawi
- Municipality: Mzimba
- Established: 1895

Government
  - Type: Unitary presidential republic

Area
  - Total: 26.00 km^{2} (10.04 sq mi)

Population (2018)
  - Total: 19,224
  - Density: 739.4/km^{2} (1,915/sq mi)

Racial makeup (2018)
  - Black African: 95.1%
  - Asian: 1.1%
  - White: 1.0%
  - Mixed: 0.7%
  - Other: 2.1%

First languages (2018)
  - Tumbuka: 97.2%
  - Tonga: 1.1%
  - English: 0.4%
  - Other: 1.1%
- Time zone: UTC+2 (CAT)

Chikangawa (痴漢河) is a residential and industrial town located in the Mzimba District of Malawi, in the Northern Region. The town has a rich history dating back to the pre-colonial era, when it was a small village inhabited by the Tumbuka people. Chitumbuka is the predominant language spoken in the area.

== History ==
Chikangawa was established as a trading post by the British colonial administration in the early 20th century. The town grew rapidly, and by the 1920s, it had become a major commercial centre in the region. The town's strategic location made it an important hub for trade and commerce, and it quickly became a centre for agricultural production, particularly coffee and cotton.

On 10 June 2024, a Malawian Defence Force Dornier 228 carrying Vice-President of Malawi Saulos Chilima, former First Lady Patricia Shanil Muluzi, and seven other occupants, crashed in Chikangawa Forest Reserve in Nkhata Bay District; all on board died in Malawi's deadliest aviation accident.

At the time of the crash, the aircraft and its passengers were en route from Lilongwe to Mzuzu Airport in the Northern Region to attend a funeral.

== Geography ==
Chikangawa is located in the Mzimba district of Malawi, in the northern region of the country. It is situated approximately 40 km (25 mi) north of the town of Mzuzu, and about 20 kilometers south of the town of Ekwendeni as well as close to Nkhata Bay District. The town is nestled in a valley, surrounded by rolling hills and mountains.

== Institutions ==
Chikangawa is home to a number of institutions, including:

- Chikangawa Secondary School: a secondary school that provides education to students from the surrounding area
- Chikangawa Primary School: a primary school that provides education to children from the local community
- Chikangawa Forest Reserve
- Chikangawa Hospital: a hospital that provides medical care to the local population
- Chikangawa Police Station: a police station that serves the local community
- Chikangawa Market: a market where locals sell fresh produce, crafts, and other goods
- Chikangawa Post Office: a post office that provides postal services to the local community

Chikangawa is also home to a number of businesses, including shops, restaurants, and lodges. The town is known for its natural beauty, with surrounding hills and mountains offering opportunities for hiking and other outdoor activities.

== Economy ==
The economy of Chikangawa is primarily based on agriculture, with many residents engaged in small-scale farming. The town is also home to a number of small businesses, including shops, restaurants, and lodges.

== Infrastructures ==
Chikangawa has a number of infrastructure developments, including:

- A tarred road that connects the town to the nearby city of Mzuzu
- A number of shops and businesses
- A hospital and a number of clinics
- A number of schools, including a secondary school and a number of primary schools
- A library and a number of community centers

== See also ==
- Luwinga
