= Queen Gondwe =

Queen Caroline Gondwe
- Born: 1942 (age 83–84); Rumphi District
- Education: in Zambia
- Occupations: teacher and politician
- Known for: cabinet minister

Queen Caroline Gondwe (born 1942) is a Malawian politician, cabinet minister and writer.

== Life ==
Gondwe was born in Rumphi District. Her parents were Rodger Muleza Chikontha Chirambo and Florence Khanyiwe Ngwira-Chirambo. She lived in Malawi until she was six. Following a health scare her father returned from Zambia to pick her up from Chiguliro Village. She completed all of her early education in Zambia.

Gondwe was appointed to a position in the Malawi Congress Party by Hastings Banda. Gondwe became the Member of Parliament for Rumphi and she became the cabinet minister for Women, Children Affairs and Community Development. During the Banda era she was the Northern Region chairperson of Chitukuko cha Amayi m'Malawi (CCAM), the women's development organisation run by Cecilia Kadzamira.

In August 2012 she joined the new People's Party that was led by Joyce Banda.

In her later years she took to writing. When she was 78 she wrote How to Raise a Spiritual Child and two years later she completed The Life Story of Queen Caroline Gondwe. In the same year Gertrude Chirambo invited her to talk to the united local government group Refela.

== Personal life ==
Her son, Hannington Gondwe was a UK delegate at a People's Party convention in 2012.
