= Viphya Mountains =

Mountain range

Coordinates: 13°3′53″S 34°11′28″E

The Viphya Mountains, also known as the Viphya Plateau or Viphya Highlands, are a mountain range in located in Chikangawa in Malawi's Northern Region.

The word viphya means "New (things)" in the Tumbuka language.

== Geography ==
The range runs north-northeast along the west shore of Lake Malawi. The range extends approximately 210 km from north to south, with Mount Champhila (1768 m) at the southern end of the range, and Mount Uzumara (1920m) at the northern end. The Mzimba Plain lies to the west. Mt. Chimaliro (2050 m.) is in the northern part of the range, about 40 km north of Mzuzu. The South Rukuru River drains the Mzimba Plain and the western slopes of the mountains. The South Rukuru drains northeastwards into Lake Malawi, and the river's lower valley defines northern end of the range, separating the Viphya Mountains from the Nyika Plateau north of the river. The eastern slopes are drained by the Luweya River and other streams which empty into Lake Malawi.

The northern and southern portions of the range are separated by a lower saddle of hills. The town of Mzuzu is located on the saddle's western slope, and Malawi's M5 Highway crosses the saddle to connect Mzuzu to Nkhata Bay on Lake Malawi.

Malawi's north-south M1 Highway crosses the southernmost end of the range.

== Ecology ==
Plant communities in the mountains vary with elevation. Miombo woodland predominates below 1600 meters elevation, with areas of lowland forest and grassland. Above 1600 meters elevation, Afromontane grasslands, shrublands, forests, and woodlands are main native plant communities, with many distinct species from the adjacent lowlands.

About 4500 hectares of montane rainforest remain in the southern part of the range, mostly in the South Viphya Forest Reserve. Ficalhoa laurifolia and Cryptocarya liebertiana are the main emergent trees in the rainforest.

Mts. Uzumara and Chimaliro support patches of montane rainforest, with Ficalhoa laurifolia and Ocotea sp. as the dominant trees, and a dense understory of Acanthaceae shrubs. Mt. Uzumara is the southern end of the range for species of butterfly, Papilio bromius, P. jacksoni and Charaxes nyikensis.

The Mtangatanga and Perekezi forest reserves, on the western slope of the mountains, protect distinctive high-altitude closed-canopy miombo forests. Brachystegia taxifolia is the dominant tree, with evergreen shrubs and mosses in the humid understory. The trees support many epiphytic orchids and lichens.

The South Viphya forests are home to Malawi's largest population of red forest duiker (Cephalophus natalensis), along with yellow baboon (Papio cynocephalus), vervet monkey (Chlorocebus pygerythrus), bushbuck (Tragelaphus sylvaticus), bushpig (Potamochoerus larvatus), and leopard (Panthera pardus).

Birds found in the range include the scaly spurfowl (Pternistis squamatus), olive woodpecker (Dendropicos griseocephalus), and the red-faced crimson-wing (Cryptospiza reichenovii). The Viphya mountains are the southernmost range for several Afromontane species of the East African mountains – the trees and shrubs Entandrophragma excelsum, Ficalhoa laurifolia, and Ocotea usambarensis; the birds Onychognathus tenuirostris and Laniarius fuelleborni; and the butterflies Precis sinuata, Henotesia ubenica, Uranothauma cuneatum, and Uranothauma heritsia.

== Forest Reserves ==
South Viphya Forest Reserve, established in 1948, has an area of 1147.8 km², covering much of the southern range. The reserve is home to the vast Viphya Plantation, also known as the Chikangawa Forest, which is mostly composed of exotic pine trees. The South Viphya Forest Reserve also includes three enclaves of native evergreen montane forest at Nthungwa (11°40’S 33°49’E, 108 ha at 1,600–1,800 m), Chamambo (11°50’S 33°50’E, 260 ha at 1,600–1,800 m) and Kawandama (12°01’S 33°52’E, 75 ha at 1,750–1,850 m.

Other forest reserves include Chimaliro and Dwambazi at the south end of the range, Mtangatanga and Perekezi on the western slope of the southern range, Ruvuo, Chisahira, and Nkhwazi on the eastern slope, Lunyangwa and Kaning'ina near Mzuzu, and Uzumara on Mt. Uzumara in the northern range.

== Viphya Plantation ==
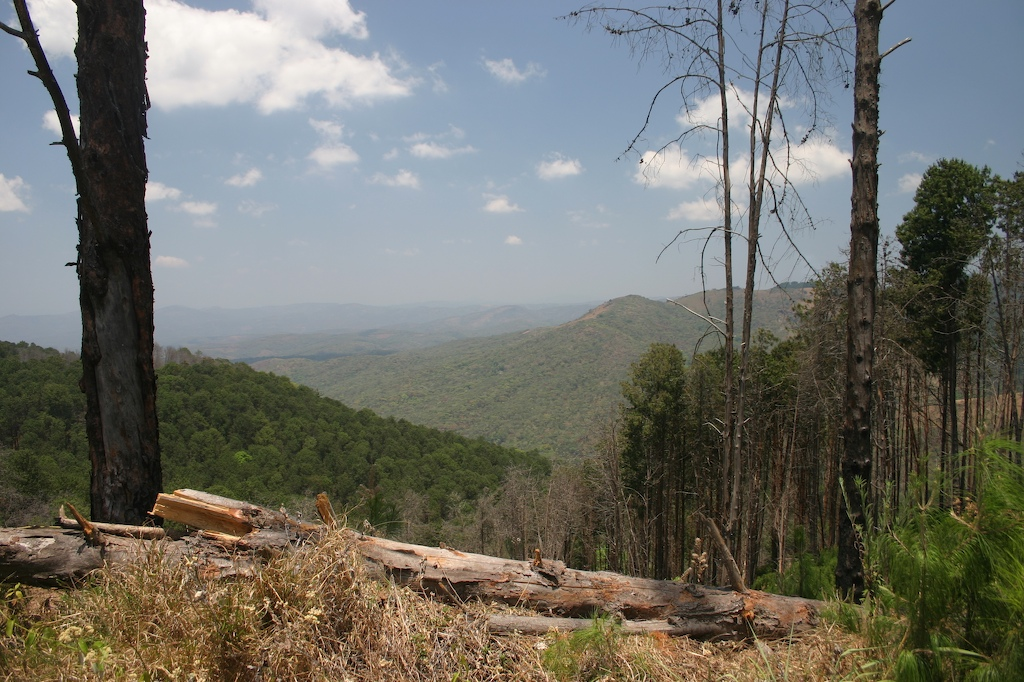
Pine trees in the Viphya Plantation

Starting in 1964, a 53,000-hectare plantation of exotic pines was planted in the South Viphya Forest Reserve. The plantation was managed by the state-owned Viphya Plywood and Allied Industries (VIPLY) corporation, and was part of a plan by Malawian president Hastings Banda to create an export-oriented pulp and paper industry in Malawi. The plantation was either the largest or the second-largest man-made forest in Africa. The pines, mostly Pinus patula, were planted on former montane grassland on the reserve's high central plateau. Enclaves of native montane forest were preserved.

Plans for pulp mill to create wood pulp for export were abandoned in the 1980s, a consequence of reduced export demand and economic recession. VIPLY was privatized in the 1990s, and in 1998 the government gave Raiply Malawi Ltd. a 15-year concession to manage 20,000 hectares of the plantation. Raiply runs a factory which makes plywood, lumber, and wood furniture in the town of Chikangawa, west of the plantation. The remaining 33,000 hectares was reserved for Malawian loggers for sustainable harvesting. The concessionaires did little replanting, and illegal logging was rampant. By 2013, only 10% of the plantation was still covered with trees. The Malawian government promised to start replanting, and recorded replanting 1600 hectares in 2012.
