= 2024 Chikangawa Dornier 228 crash =

Aviation accident in Malawi

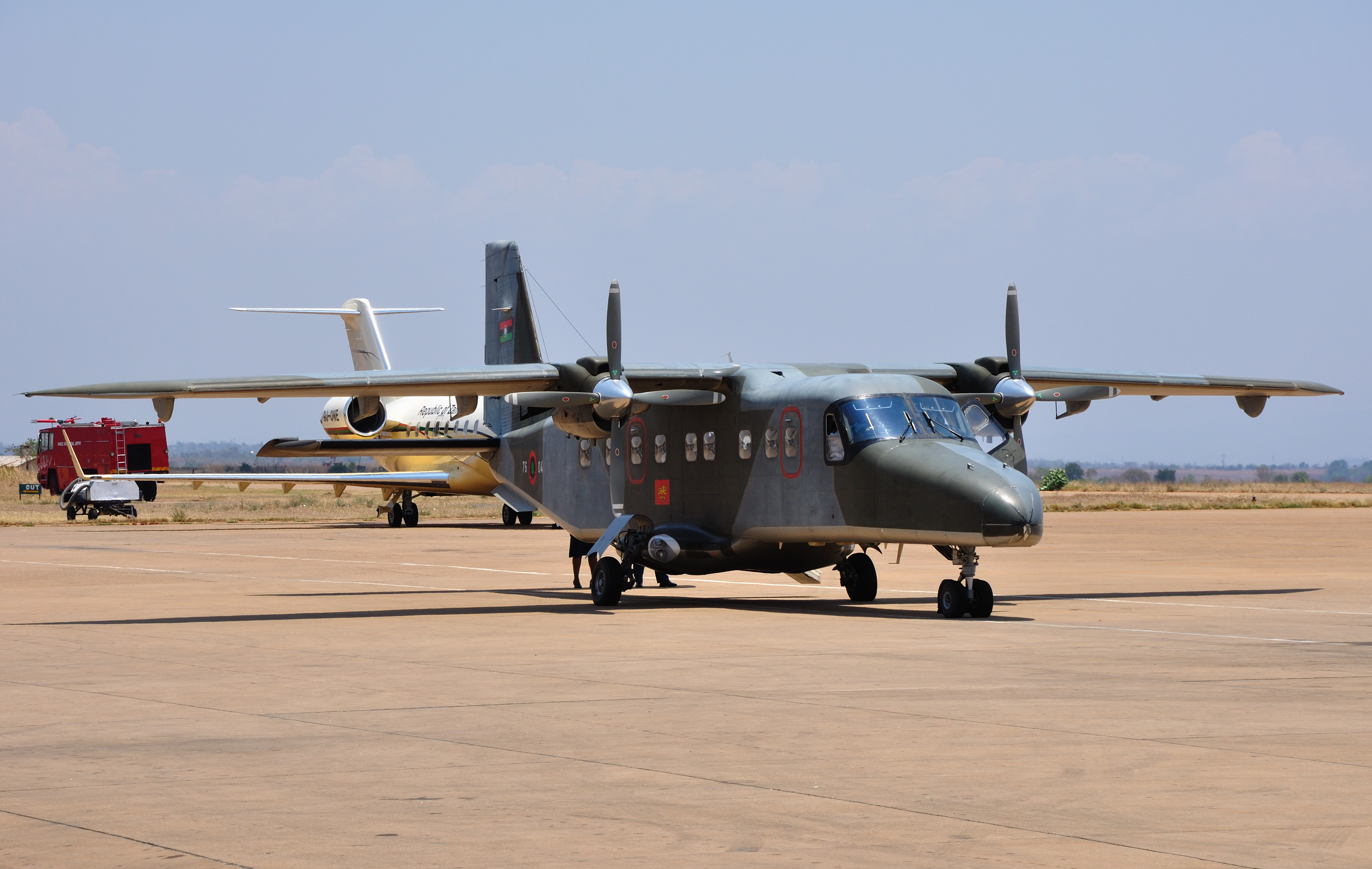
- A Malawi Air Force Dornier 228, sister to the aircraft involved in the accident

Accident
- Date: 10 June 2024
- Summary: Crashed during landing due to Pilot error
- Site: Chikangawa Forest Reserve, Nkhata Bay District, Northern Region, Malawi

Aircraft
- Aircraft type: Dornier 228
- Operator: Malawi Defence Force
- Registration: MAF-T03
- Flight origin: Kamuzu International Airport, Lilongwe, Malawi
- Destination: Mzuzu Airport, Mzuzu, Malawi
- Occupants: 9
- Passengers: 6
- Crew: 3
- Fatalities: 9
- Survivors: 0

On 10 June 2024, a Malawian Defence Force Dornier 228 carrying Vice-President of Malawi Saulos Chilima, former First Lady Patricia Shanil Muluzi, and seven other occupants, crashed in Chikangawa Forest Reserve in Nkhata Bay District; all on board died in Malawi's deadliest aviation accident.

At the time of the crash, the aircraft and its passengers were en route from Lilongwe to Mzuzu Airport in the Northern Region to attend a funeral.

== Background ==
The aircraft involved, manufactured in 1987, was a Dornier 228-228(K) which belonged to the Malawi Air Force. The aircraft had accumulated 3,492 flight hours. It had previously been used to transport President Lazarus Chakwera several times and had conducted its previous flight hours before the crash.

On 10 June 2024, the aircraft, carrying Vice-President Saulos Chilima, former First Lady Patricia Shanil Muluzi, and seven other occupants, including members of Chilima's staff and security detail and three military crew, left Kamuzu International Airport in the capital Lilongwe at 9:17 a.m. CAT, and was scheduled to arrive at Mzuzu Airport in the Northern Region at 10:02 a.m. The passengers were on their way to attend the funeral for former government minister Ralph Kasambara, and were to return to Lilongwe afterward.

== Accident ==
The aircraft disappeared from radar shortly after taking off from Lilongwe, with aviation officials unable to contact the aircraft. The disappearance prompted a search and rescue operation to locate the aircraft.

Poor weather conditions prevailed along the intended flight path, and eyewitnesses reported an aircraft crash in the Chikangawa Forest area. Chilima's phone was reported by local news sources to have been last detected at around 10:30 a.m. Authorities said that the aircraft had turned back from Mzuzu due to poor visibility.

The wreckage of the aircraft was found by Malawi Defence Force soldiers in Chikangawa Forest on 11 June. No survivors were found. Authorities described the aircraft as "completely destroyed", with its occupants believed to have died on impact.

== Recovery efforts ==
President Lazarus Chakwera cancelled a visit to the Bahamas after learning about the disappearance from Malawi Defence Force chief General Paul Valentino Phiri, and ordered a search and rescue operation. He also called for prayers for the missing and their families. The United States, the United Kingdom, Norway and Israel offered assistance and provided "specialized technologies", with the US embassy offering the use of a C-12 aircraft from the Department of Defense. The Malawian government also asked for assistance from neighbouring Zambia and Tanzania.

== Aftermath ==
The remains of the victims were transported to Lilongwe aboard a Zambian Air Force helicopter on 11 June. President Chakwera subsequently declared 21 days of national mourning beginning on 11 June and said that Chilima would be accorded a state funeral.

A service was held for Chilima at the Bingu National Stadium in Lilongwe on 16 June, during which at least 41,000 people attended. Chakwera and other government officials were booed by some mourners, forcing Catholic priests officiating the ceremony to intervene and restore order. Clashes erupted between police and mourners as Chilima's remains were being transported to Ntcheu on the evening of 16 June, and a vehicle in his convoy ran over several pedestrians as it was passing through Dedza, killing four people and injuring 12 others. Chilima was buried on 17 June in his home village of Nsipe, in a ceremony that was also attended by Chakwera and his three living predecessors as president, Bakili Muluzi, Joyce Banda and Peter Mutharika.

On 21 June, Michael Usi, the deputy leader of Chilima's political party, the United Transformation Movement (UTM), was appointed as the new vice president.

== Investigation ==
Chakwera called for an independent investigation into the crash, saying that the Malawi Defence Force cannot conduct an investigation "that can be credible on its own". Government spokesperson Moses Kunkuyu announced that the German Federal Bureau of Aircraft Accident Investigation (BFU) would investigate the accident with a representative of General Atomics also joining the investigation.

=== Interim report ===
On 30 August, the BFU released their interim report, finding that adverse weather conditions were a significant factor that led to the accident, with the aircraft descending into a hillside due to the pilots suffering spatial disorientation in deteriorating weather conditions. The report noted that the aircraft was equipped with neither a cockpit voice recorder (CVR) nor a flight data recorder (FDR). Additionally, the BFU found that the aircraft's emergency locator transmitter (ELT) was non functioning because its battery had been expired since 2004. According to the Malawi Air Force, there were no spare parts to replace the battery and no budget to replace the older ELT with a newer version. Radar coverage was also found to have been insufficient with radio communications between the flight crew and air traffic controls (ATC) at Lilongwe Airport and Mzuzu Airport not having been recorded.

=== Final Report ===
According to the final report released on 6 October 2025 by the BFU, the cause of the accident is attributable to pilot error. The pilots, according to the final report, continued to fly under instrument meteorological conditions despite the conditions requiring visual flight rules. Three other factors contributed to the accident, related to human error and the pilots' mental state. Some recommendations are also made.

== Immediate reactions ==
President Chakwera said he was "deeply saddened and sorry" over the disaster and praised Chilima, describing him as a "formidable VP". FIFA president Gianni Infantino, who was in Malawi for a scheduled visit and had been due to meet with Chilima, expressed his condolences to his widow, Mary Nkhamanyachi Chilima.

The UTM accused authorities of a slow response to the disaster and said that the aircraft did not carry a transponder.

== 2024 Commission of Inquiry ==
A separate investigation by a Malawi government-appointed commission of inquiry also did not find evidence of foul play in the crash.

== 2026 Commission of Inquiry ==
The 2026 Parliamentary Investigation into the Chikangawa plane crash is a Malawian government-mandated review ordered in February 2026 to revisit the circumstances of the 10 June 2024 military aircraft accident that killed former Vice-president Saulos Chilima and eight others. The decision followed a review by the Minister of Justice and Constitutional Affairs Charles Mhango, who reported to Parliament that earlier inquiries, including the 2024 commission of inquiry and the two assessments conducted by German aviation experts, had left key questions unanswered. Parliament was directed to appoint an ad hoc committee, supported by international aviation experts, to carry out the new investigation.

== See also ==
- Commission of Inquiry into the 2024 Chikangawa (Nthungwa) aircraft accident
- 2024 Lake Ranco helicopter crash
- 2024 Varzaqan helicopter crash
