= Atupele Muluzi =

Malawian politician

Honourable Atupele Muluzi MP
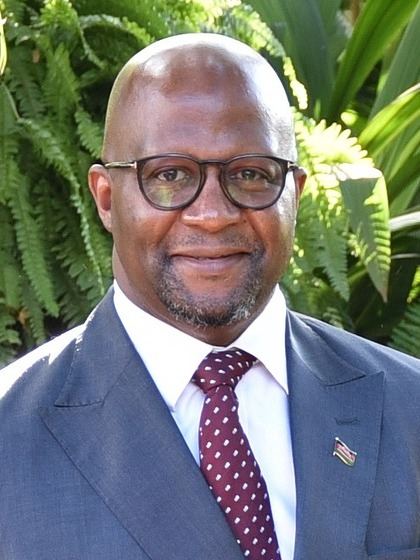
- Muluzi in 2025

Minister of Health
- In office 23 June 2016 – 2019
- President: Peter Mutharika

Member of Parliament for Machinga North East
- In office 2004–2019

Personal details
- Born: 6 August 1978 (age 48) Lilongwe, Malawi
- Party: United Democratic Front
- Spouse: Angela Zachepa (m. 2013)
- Children: 2
- Parent(s): Bakili Muluzi (father); Annie Chidzira Muluzi (mother)
- Education: University of Leicester (BA); University of Law
- Profession: Politician

Atupele Austin Muluzi (born 6 August 1978) is a Malawian politician, businessman and was a Member of Parliament for Machinga North East constituency from 2004 until May 27, 2019. He is also the President of the United Democratic Front and was a presidential candidate during the 2019 election. He was a running mate in the 2020 presidential elections, on a coalition ticket with incumbent President Peter Mutharika of the Democratic Progressive Party. Muluzi was Minister of Natural Resources, Energy and Mining from 2014 to 2015 and the only opposition member to serve in the Mutharika administration. Subsequently, he served as Minister of Home Affairs and Internal Security in 2015, and then Minister of Lands, Housing and Urban Development in 2015. He is the son of the former president Bakili Muluzi.

== Early life ==
Muluzi was born in 1978 at Kamuzu Central Hospital in Lilongwe to Bakili Muluzi and Annie Chidzira Muluzi. He attended Eastridge (in Harare, Zimbabwe), Saint Andrews International High School in Blantyre and Bentham Grammar School in Yorkshire, England, where he became its head boy. He studied Economics and Law at the University of Leicester, and at the University of Law in London, United Kingdom.

== Political career ==
He was first elected to parliament in 2004 and continued to represent the Machinga North East constituency until May 27, 2019, when he lost elections as MP and presidential candidate. He campaigned on a new beginning.

A fierce critic of President Bingu wa Mutharika, he was arrested on 20 February 2012 on his way to a political rally where he was expected to address supporters. He was stopped by the police at a road block, where he was questioned and told that he did not have proper permits to hold a public meeting. However permission had been granted prior to the meeting. Muluzi was later arrested for inciting violence and charged for disobeying notification of a district commissioner. The police attacked the crowds, throwing teargas at them to disperse the rally. This incited the crowd to protest against the police and burn down a police station and surrounding police cars. Less than two weeks after Muluzi's release, President Mutharika died.

President Joyce Banda took over the reins of power and appointed Muluzi as Minister of Economic Planning and Development in her administration. He resigned after some senior members of the ruling party verbally attacked him at a political rally due to his position as the leader of an opposition party. After resigning, he began to focus on his career as the leader of his party.

In June 2014, Muluzi was appointed by President Peter Mutharika as Minister of Natural Resources, Energy, and Mining. He was moved to the post of Minister of Home Affairs and Internal Security on 10 April 2015. He was again moved, this time to the post of Minister of Lands, Housing and Urban Development, in August 2015.

Muluzi, as Minister of Health, persuaded parliament to de-criminalise the transmission of HIV. He was supported by Sarai Chisala Tempelhoff's Women's Lawyers Association and the Female Sex Workers Association. The existing law they argued was based on fear and not on logic as they argued that the current law increased violence against women.

After a court decision overturned the 2019 presidential election in Malawi, Muluzi formed a coalition with President Mutharika to be his running mate in the 2020 presidential elections.

== Personal life ==
He is the son of Bakili Muluzi, Malawi's second President, and Annie Chidzira Muluzi, Malawi's former first lady. In November 2013, he married Angela Zachepa and they have two children. He is a Muslim.
