= Annie Chidzira Muluzi =

First lady of Malawi (1952–2021)

Annie Muluzi
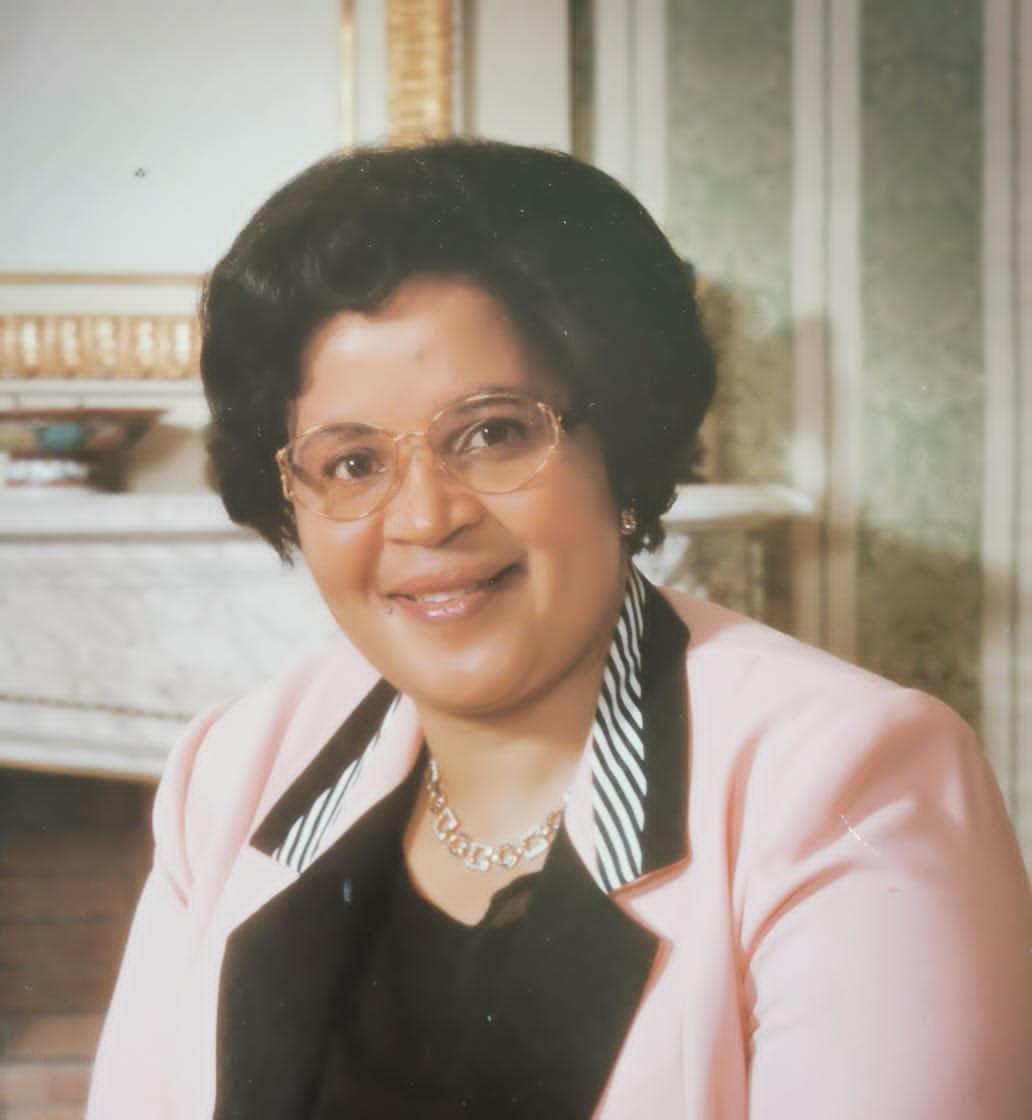

First Lady of Malawi
- In role 24 May 1994 – 1999
- President: Bakili Muluzi
- Preceded by: Cecilia Kadzamira
- Succeeded by: Patricia Shanil Muluzi

Personal details
- Born: Annie Chidzira Muluzi; 18 March 1952 Nyasaland
- Died: 28 December 2021 (aged 69) Nairobi, Kenya
- Party: United Democratic Front (Malawi)
- Spouse: Bakili Muluzi (?–1999; divorced)
- Children: Atupele Muluzi; Esme Atweni Muluzi Malisita (deceased)

Annie Chidzira Muluzi (18 March 1952 – 28 December 2021) was First Lady of Malawi and then-wife of Bakili Muluzi. As first lady she was the founder of the Freedom Foundation Trust. She died on 28 December 2021 in Nairobi Kenya.

== Personal life and death ==
Muluzi had two children from her marriage with Bakili Muluzi, namely Austin Atupele Muluzi and Esmie Atweni Muluzi Malisita. The couple lived in a polygamous marriage arrangement as practiced by Islamic custom and Muluzi was also married to Patricia Shanil Muluzi from 1989. On 15 March 1999, Muluzi announced officially the separation from her after 30 years of marriage. He then remarried Patricia Shanil Muluzi in a formal ceremony to mark her new position as the official first lady. Up until their separation in March 1999, Muluzi lived with Anne in the State House in Blantyre. Muluzi's second wife, Patricia Muluzi, resided at another of Muluzi's official residences in the former colonial capital of Zomba.

Her first born daughter, Esme Atweni Muluzi Malisita, died after lightning struck her on December 12, 2016. She was pronounced dead at Mwaiwathu Private Hospital. Annie Muluzi died from cancer on 28 December 2021.
