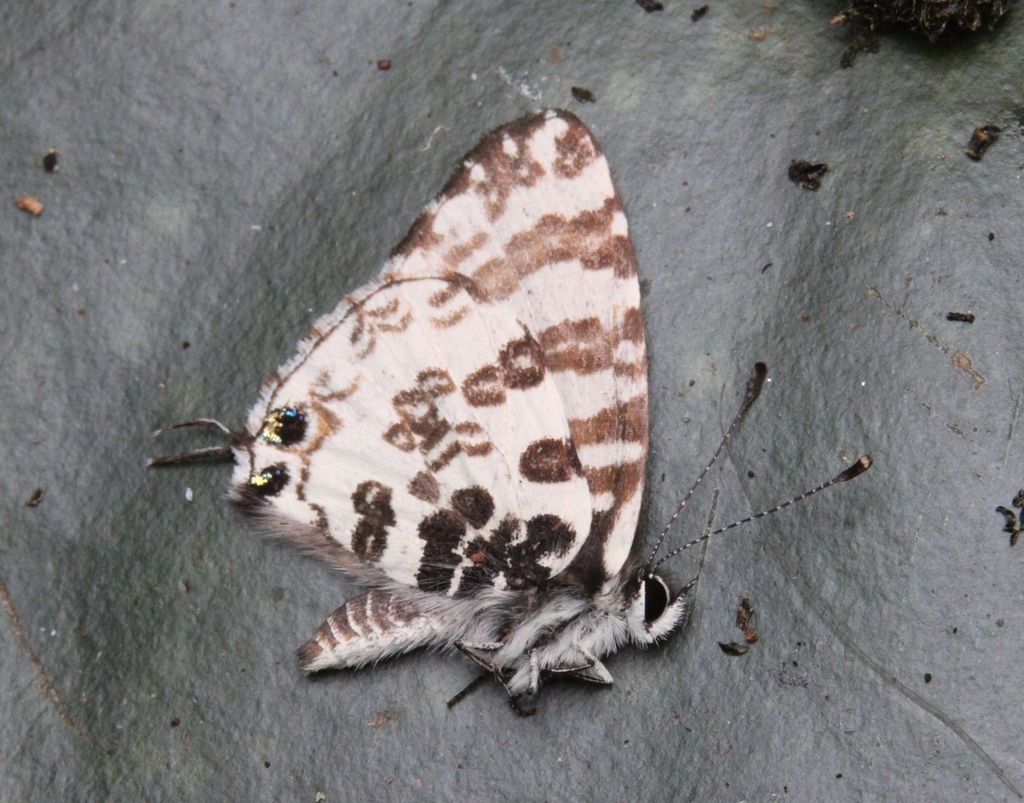

Scientific classification
- Kingdom: Animalia
- Phylum: Arthropoda
- Class: Insecta
- Order: Lepidoptera
- Family: Lycaenidae
- Genus: Uranothauma
- Species: U. antinorii

Binomial name
- Uranothauma antinorii (Oberthür, 1883)

Synonyms
- Lycaena antinorii Oberthür, 1883; Cupido felthami Stevenson, 1934; Uranothauma antinorii f. albicans Talbot, 1935; Uranothauma antinorii f. splendens Stoneham, 1937; Uranothauma antinorii f. magnificans Stoneham, 1937

= Uranothauma antinorii =

Species of butterfly

Uranothauma antinorii, the blue heart or Antinori's branded blue, is a butterfly in the family Lycaenidae. It is found in Nigeria, Cameroon, the Democratic Republic of the Congo, Ethiopia, Uganda, Rwanda, Burundi, Kenya, Tanzania, Zambia, Malawi, Mozambique and Zimbabwe. The habitat consists of edges of submontane forests.

It has (recto) dark violet forewings bordered with blackish, and bluish-grey hindwings darker at the margin and base.

== Subspecies ==
- Uranothauma antinorii antinorii (highlands Ethiopia)
- Uranothauma antinorii bamendanus Libert, 1993 (Nigeria, highlands Cameroon)
- Uranothauma antinorii felthami (Stevenson, 1934) (Kenya: west and the central highlands, Uganda, Tanzania, Democratic Republic of the Congo: Lualaba and Shaba, northern Zambia, Malawi, Mozambique, eastern Zimbabwe)
