= Chitukuko cha Amayi m'Malawi =

Chitukuko cha Amayi m'Malawi (CCAM; also spelled Chitukuko cha Amai m'Malawi) was a women's development organisation in Malawi during the one-party rule of Hastings Banda. The name translates as "women's development in Malawi". It was run by Cecilia Kadzamira, Banda's official hostess, and did not survive the change to multiparty politics in 1994.

== History ==
Kayuni writes that CCAM was established as a charity in 1985 and began as a sub-organisation of the Malawi Congress Party's League of Malawi Women. The EastAfrican gives the founding year as 1984, and reported that Kadzamira set up CCAM although the party's Women League already existed, and Banda was first reluctant to allow it. By 1987 CCAM had been made a government department in the Office of the President and Cabinet, with Kadzamira as its national advisor. CCAM had regional structures, and Queen Gondwe who became a cabinet minister under Banda, was its regional chairperson for the Northern Region.

== Activities ==
CCAM concentrated on women's development, giving small business loans and vocational training to help women earn an income. Offices were set up in different parts of the country, Janet Karim wrote that Kadzamira introduced CCAM at a launch event in Blantyre, held at the Blantyre Christian Centre. During the launch Kadzamira said there would be no membership fees, but all women in Malawi were expected to be members and to take part.

In 1992 the group published Malawi's traditional and modern cooking. Karim described the group as a way for women to contribute to the country's development agenda. Karim called it a creation of the Malawi Congress Party that ended with the start of democratic government in 1994.

== Legacy ==
The 1992 cookery book was revised in 2008 and re-published. In 2015 the book was reviewed in the Sunday Times.

A 2026 Maravi Post article described CCAM as laying the groundwork that later first ladies used to raise resources and reach rural communities through their charities. Indiana University holds Paula Rae Brody's research files on CCAM including brochures, project records and workshop materials, as part of its H.K. Banda Archive.

== See also ==
- Women in Malawi
