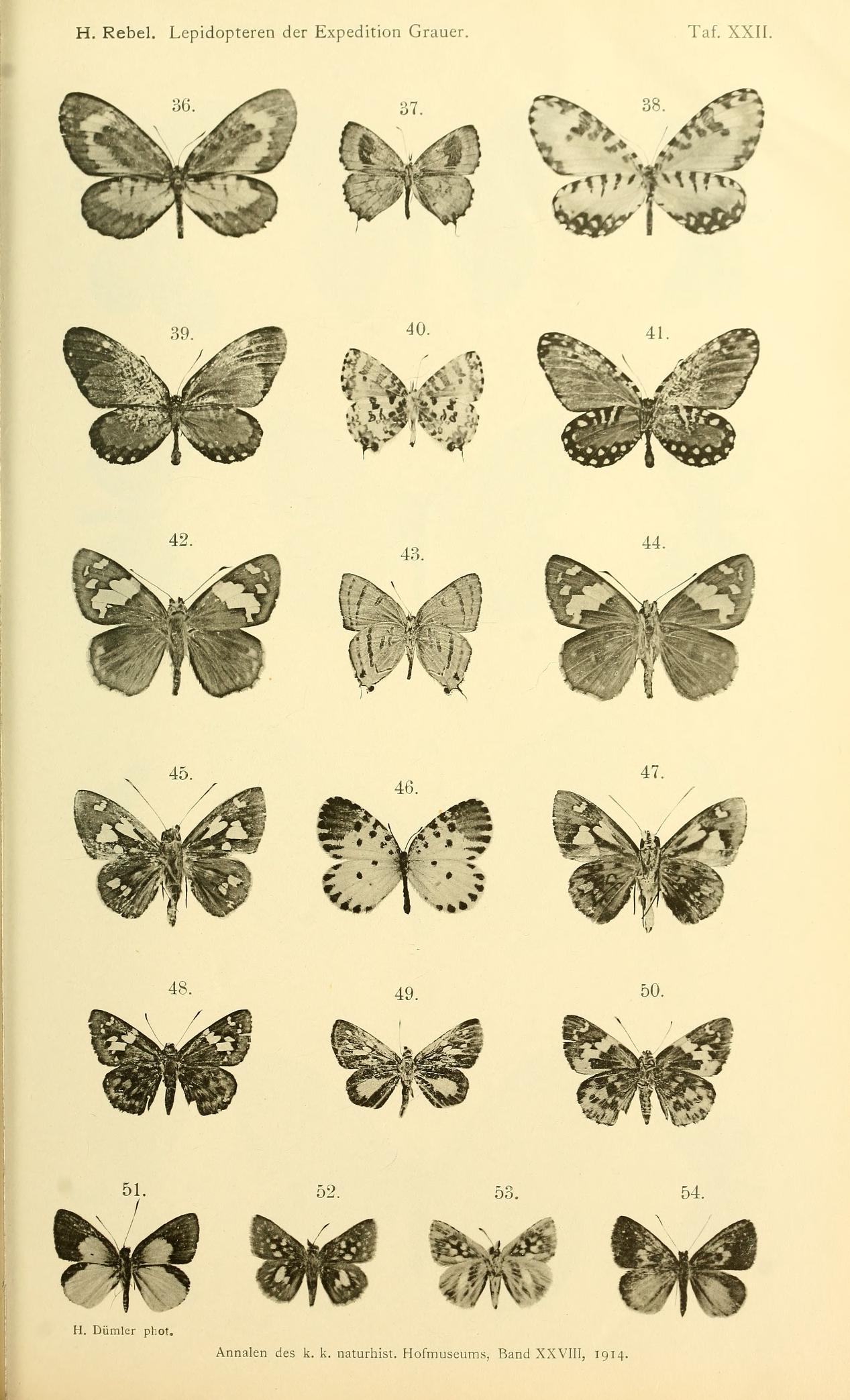
- Figure 37

Scientific classification
- Domain: Eukaryota
- Kingdom: Animalia
- Phylum: Arthropoda
- Class: Insecta
- Order: Lepidoptera
- Family: Lycaenidae
- Genus: Uranothauma
- Species: U. lunifer

Binomial name
- Uranothauma lunifer (Rebel, 1914)

Synonyms
- Cupido lunifer Rebel, 1914

= Uranothauma lunifer =

Species of butterfly

Uranothauma lunifer is a butterfly in the family Lycaenidae. It is found in south-western Uganda, the Democratic Republic of the Congo (from the eastern part of the country to Kivu), Rwanda and western Tanzania.
