= Charles Mhango =

Malawian politician

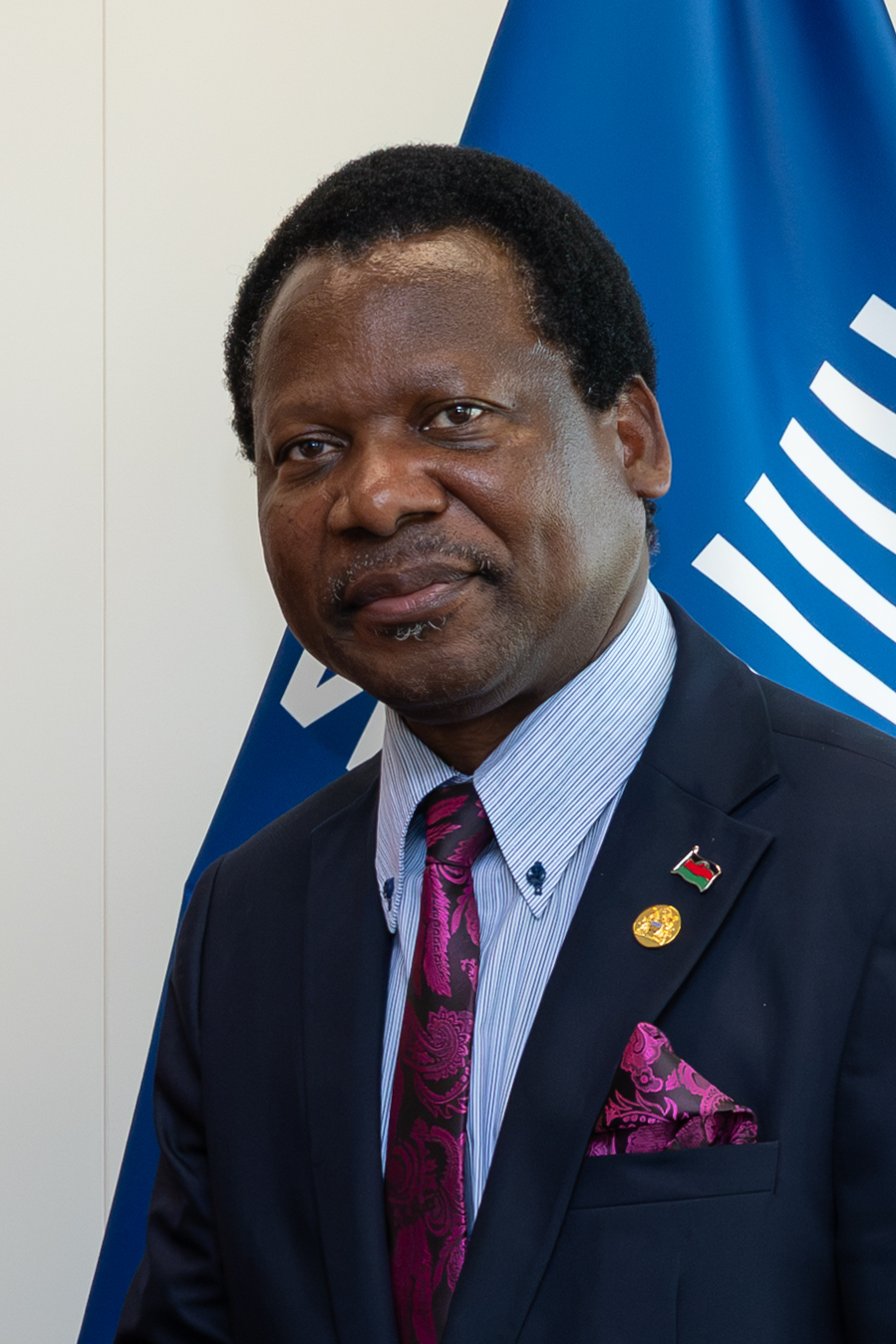
- in 2026

Minister of Justice and Constitutional Affairs
- Incumbent
- Assumed office October 30, 2025
- President: Peter Mutharika
- Preceded by: Titus Mvalo

Personal details
- Party: Democratic Progressive Party
- Education: University of Malawi
- Occupation: Lawyer, politician

Charles Mhango is a Malawian politician who currently (2026) serves as minister of Justice and Constitutional Affairs. He was appointed to the position by President Peter Mutharika on 30 October 2025.

== Career ==
In November 2025, Mhango announced that he had initiated a review of the 2024 Commission of Inquiry report into the 10 June aircraft accident that killed the former vice-president Saulos Chilima and eight others, along with the two assessments conducted by German aviation experts. He stated that the review would determine whether there was more that needed to be done. In the same month, he also informed Parliament that the ruling Democratic Progressive Party was introducing a stricter vetting process for politicians from other parties seeking to join the party, a measure he said was intended to curb “political tourism” and ensure alignment with the party’s values and commitment.

In February 2026, Mhango told Parliament that President Mutharika had ordered a fresh inquiry into the Chikangawa plane crash that killed former vice president Saulos Chilima and eight others, noting that the new investigation would be conducted by a parliamentary committee of lawmakers from different parties with support from technical experts, unlike the previous inquiry.
