= Uranothauma uganda =

Scientific classification
- Domain: Eukaryota
- Kingdom: Animalia
- Phylum: Arthropoda
- Class: Insecta
- Order: Lepidoptera
- Family: Lycaenidae
- Genus: Uranothauma
- Species: U. uganda

Binomial name
- Uranothauma uganda Kielland, 1980

Species of butterfly

Uranothauma uganda is a butterfly in the family Lycaenidae. It is found in Tanzania (Mount Bondwa in the Uluguru Mountains) and Malawi (Mount Mlanje). Despite the name, the species is not found in Uganda.
