= Gertrude Maseko =

Malawian politician, First Lady from (2014–2020; since 2025)

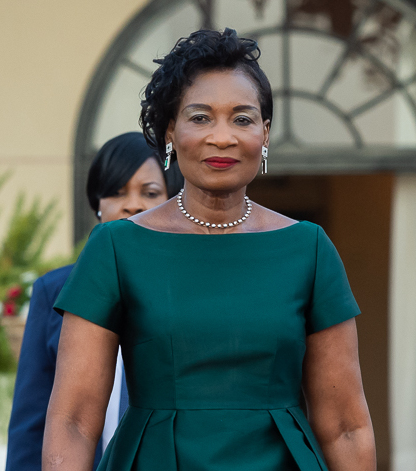
- Maseko in 2018

First Lady of Malawi
- Incumbent
- Assumed role 4 October 2025
- President: Peter Mutharika
- Preceded by: Monica Chakwera
- In role 21 June 2014 – 28 June 2020
- President: Peter Mutharika
- Preceded by: Richard Banda
- Succeeded by: Monica Chakwera

Member of Parliament for Balaka North constituency
- In office 2009–2014
- Succeeded by: Lucius Banda

Personal details
- Born: c. 1961 (age 64–65)
- Party: Democratic Progressive Party
- Spouse: Peter Mutharika (m. 2014)
- Children: Tadikira Mafubza (from first marriage)
- Profession: Nurse

Gertrude Hendrina Maseko (born c. 1961) is a former member of the national assembly and the current First Lady of Malawi.

Maseko originates from the village of Kapasule in Balaka District. She was educated at St Mary's Secondary School in Zomba. She was a member of the National Assembly for the DPP between 2009 and 2014, having been elected in the 2009 general elections. She married President Peter Mutharika on 21 June 2014.

== Notable works ==
Gertrude started a movement called Beautify Malawi Trust, which is aimed at keeping the cities around Malawi clean and litter free. This also created employment for several people.

In 2018 Jean Kalilani who was the Minister for gender, disability and social welfare organised celebrations for International Women's Day involving the first lady and concentrating on women in the countryside.
