= Uranothauma nguru =

Scientific classification
- Kingdom: Animalia
- Phylum: Arthropoda
- Class: Insecta
- Order: Lepidoptera
- Family: Lycaenidae
- Genus: Uranothauma
- Species: U. nguru

Binomial name
- Uranothauma nguru Kielland, 1985

Species of butterfly

Uranothauma nguru is a butterfly in the family Lycaenidae. It is found in Tanzania from the eastern part of the country to the Nguru Mountains.
