= Monica Chakwera =

First Lady of Malawi from 2020 to 2025

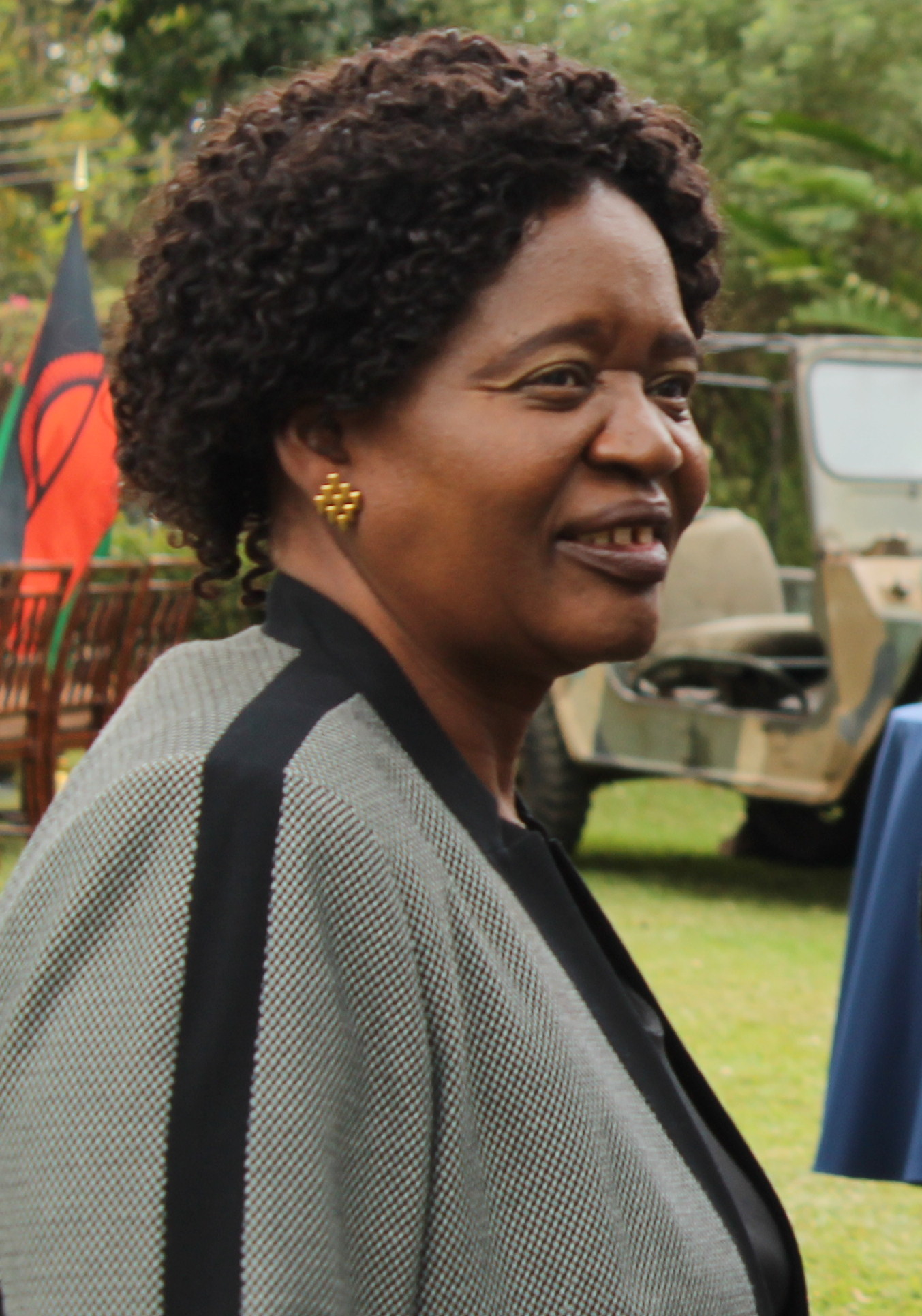
- Chakwera in 2018

First Lady of Malawi
- In role 28 June 2020 – 4 October 2025
- President: Lazarus Chakwera
- Preceded by: Gertrude Maseko
- Succeeded by: Gertrude Maseko

Personal details
- Born: Monica Gondwé; 30 September 1958 (age 67) Mwazisi village, T/A Chikulamayembe, Rumphi District, Malawi
- Spouse: Lazarus Chakwera (m. 1977)
- Children: 4
- Parents: Robert Gondwé; Vailet Luhanga
- Website: https://www.soff.org.mw/

Monica Chakwera (née Gondwé; born 30 September 1958) ia a Malawian accountant who served as the First Lady of Malawi from 2020 to 2025, as the wife of Lazarus Chakwera, the sixth president of Malawi.

== Early life and education ==
Monica Gondwé was born on 30 September 1958 in Mwazisi village, T/A Chikulamayembe, Rumphi District, in the northern part of Malawi to Robert Gondwé and Vailet Luhanga Gondwé (née Luhanga). She was educated for high school at Likuni Girls' Secondary School She is an accountant and a qualified social worker with a Bachelor of Arts degree in social work from the University of the North, in South Africa.

== Marriage to Lazarus Chakwera ==
Chakwera married Lazarus on 8 October 1977. They have four children and grandchildren.

== Charity ==
Chakwera founded the Shaping Our Future Foundation, an organization that is concerned with the development of the village girl. The initiative was launched at the palace. It was not funded by the government but by large companies.
