= Uranothauma usambarae =

Scientific classification
- Kingdom: Animalia
- Phylum: Arthropoda
- Class: Insecta
- Order: Lepidoptera
- Family: Lycaenidae
- Genus: Uranothauma
- Species: U. usambarae

Binomial name
- Uranothauma usambarae Kielland, 1980

Species of butterfly

Uranothauma usambarae is a butterfly in the family Lycaenidae. It is found in Tanzania in the western Usambara Mountains.

It belongs to the insecta class.
