= Uranothauma kilimensis =

Scientific classification
- Kingdom: Animalia
- Phylum: Arthropoda
- Class: Insecta
- Order: Lepidoptera
- Family: Lycaenidae
- Genus: Uranothauma
- Species: U. kilimensis

Binomial name
- Uranothauma kilimensis Kielland, 1985

Species of butterfly

Uranothauma kilimensis is a butterfly in the family Lycaenidae. It is found in Tanzania (Kilimanjaro).
