= Uranothauma vansomereni =

Scientific classification
- Domain: Eukaryota
- Kingdom: Animalia
- Phylum: Arthropoda
- Class: Insecta
- Order: Lepidoptera
- Family: Lycaenidae
- Genus: Uranothauma
- Species: U. vansomereni

Binomial name
- Uranothauma vansomereni Stempffer, 1951

Species of butterfly

Uranothauma vansomereni, the pale heart, is a butterfly in the family Lycaenidae. It is found in Kenya, Tanzania (Madibira and Ilenga), the Democratic Republic of the Congo (from the south-eastern part of the country to Shaba), Malawi, Zambia, Mozambique and eastern Zimbabwe. The habitat consists of savanna.

Both sexes mud-puddle. There seem to be two generations per year, with adults on wing in spring and autumn.

The larvae feed on Albizia species.
