= Uranothauma belcastroi =

Scientific classification
- Domain: Eukaryota
- Kingdom: Animalia
- Phylum: Arthropoda
- Class: Insecta
- Order: Lepidoptera
- Family: Lycaenidae
- Genus: Uranothauma
- Species: U. belcastroi

Binomial name
- Uranothauma belcastroi Larsen, 1997

Species of butterfly

Uranothauma belcastroi the Belcastro's branded blue, is a butterfly in the family Lycaenidae. It is found in Guinea, Sierra Leone and Ivory Coast. The habitat consists of upland forests.

Adult males mud-puddle. Adults are on wing in October.
