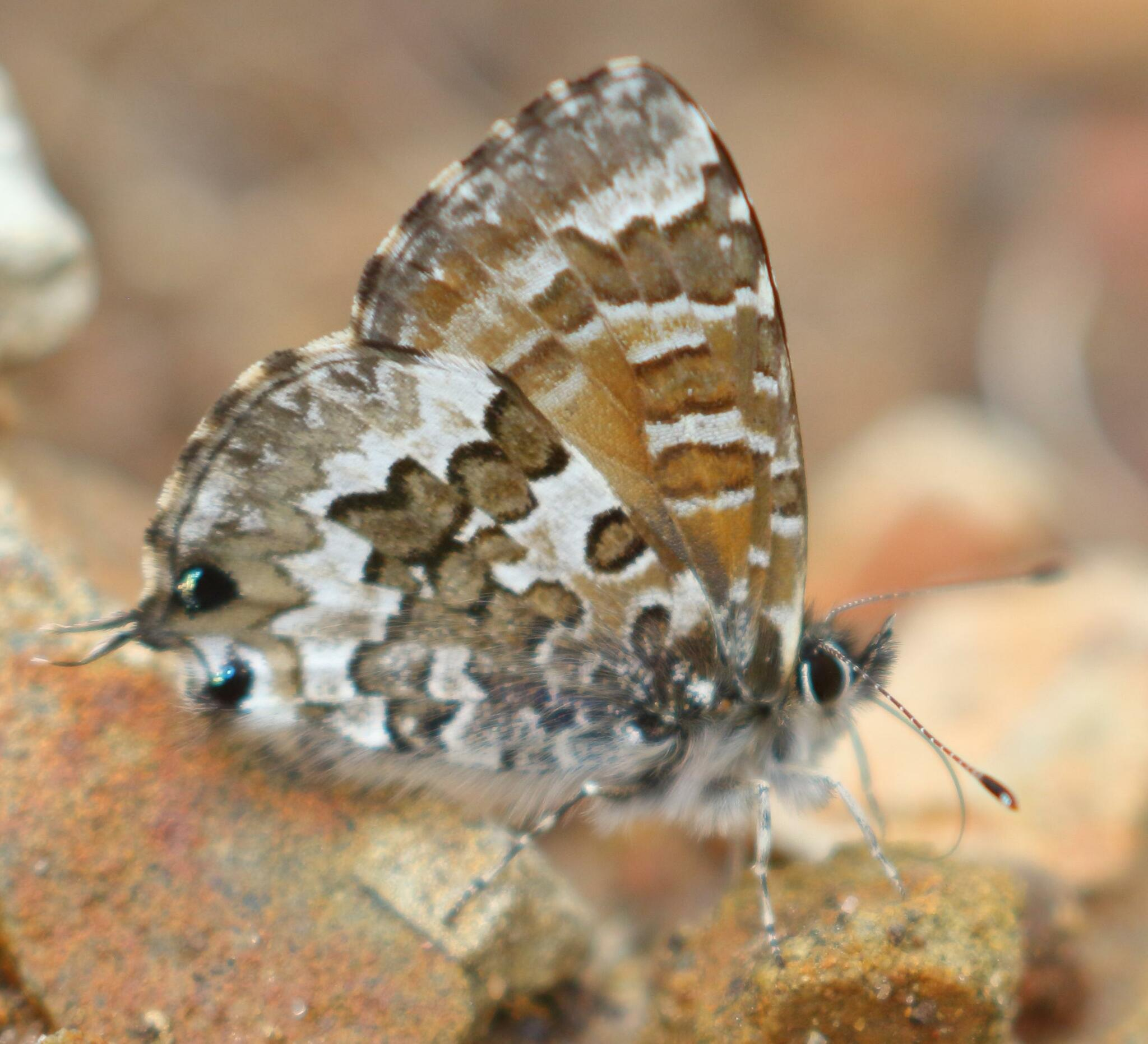

Scientific classification
- Kingdom: Animalia
- Phylum: Arthropoda
- Class: Insecta
- Order: Lepidoptera
- Family: Lycaenidae
- Genus: Uranothauma
- Species: U. nubifer

Binomial name
- Uranothauma nubifer (Trimen, 1895)

Synonyms
- Lycaena nubifer Trimen, 1895; Lampides pelotus Karsch, 1895; Cupido nubifer var. distinctesignatus Strand, 1911; Uranothauma nubifer abyssinica Libert, 1993

= Uranothauma nubifer =

Species of butterfly

Uranothauma nubifer, the black heart or black-heart branded blue, is a butterfly of the family Lycaenidae. It is found from Ethiopia to South Africa. It is also found in eastern Democratic Republic of the Congo.

The wingspan is 22–26 mm for males and 24–28 mm for females. Adults are on wing year-round, with a peak from November to February.

The larvae feed on Acacia species, including A. karroo.

== Subspecies ==
- Uranothauma nubifer nubifer (Nigeria, Cameroon, Kenya: west, central and the Teita Hills, Burundi, eastern Democratic Republic of the Congo, Tanzania, northern Zambia, Mozambique, Zimbabwe, Eswatini, South Africa: Limpopo Province, Mpumalanga, North West Province, Gauteng, KwaZulu-Natal)
- Uranothauma nubifer distinctesignatus (Strand, 1911) (Ethiopia)
