= Uranothauma williamsi =

Scientific classification
- Domain: Eukaryota
- Kingdom: Animalia
- Phylum: Arthropoda
- Class: Insecta
- Order: Lepidoptera
- Family: Lycaenidae
- Genus: Uranothauma
- Species: U. williamsi

Binomial name
- Uranothauma williamsi Carcasson, 1961

Species of butterfly

Uranothauma williamsi is a butterfly in the family Lycaenidae. It is found in Tanzania (the Usambara Mountains and the Southern Highlands), Malawi and Zambia. The habitat consists of montane forests.
