= Uranothauma cordatus =

- Line "i", last image

Scientific classification
- Kingdom: Animalia
- Phylum: Arthropoda
- Clade: Pancrustacea
- Class: Insecta
- Order: Lepidoptera
- Family: Lycaenidae
- Genus: Uranothauma
- Species: U. cordatus

Binomial name
- Uranothauma cordatus (Sharpe, 1892)

Synonyms
- Hyreus cordatus Sharpe, 1892

Species of butterfly

Uranothauma cordatus is a butterfly in the family Lycaenidae. It is found in Uganda, the Democratic Republic of the Congo (the north-eastern part of the country to Kivu), Kenya and northern Tanzania. The habitat consists of montane areas at altitudes above 1,500 meters.

Adult males mud-puddle and have also been recorded on excrement.
