= Angela Zachepa =

Malawian accountant and politician

Angela Zachepa-Muluzi

Member of Parliament for Blantyre North East
- In office 2004–2009
- Succeeded by: Cecelia Chanzama

Personal details
- Born: c. 1983
- Spouse: Austin Muluzi
- Education: University of Malawi, Polytechnic (BAcc)
- Profession: Accountant

Angela Zachepa-Muluzi is a Malawian accountant and politician who served as a Member of Parliament. She is known for being the youngest person ever elected to be elected to the Malawian Parliament, earning the informal title “Baby of the House.”

== Education and early career ==
Zachepa-Muluzi earned a bachelor's degree in Accounting from the University of Malawi, Polytechnic. After graduating, she began her career as a professional accountant.

== Political career ==
At the age of 21, Angela Zachepa-Muluzi was elected as a Member of Parliament for the Blantyre North East constituency in the 2004 general election. This victory made her the youngest Member of Parliament in Malawi's history. She served one term and lost her re-election bid in 2009 to Cecelia Chanzama, a result she publicly contested.

== Personal life ==
Angela Zachepa-Muluzi is married to Austin Muluzi, the son of former Malawian President Bakili Muluzi.
