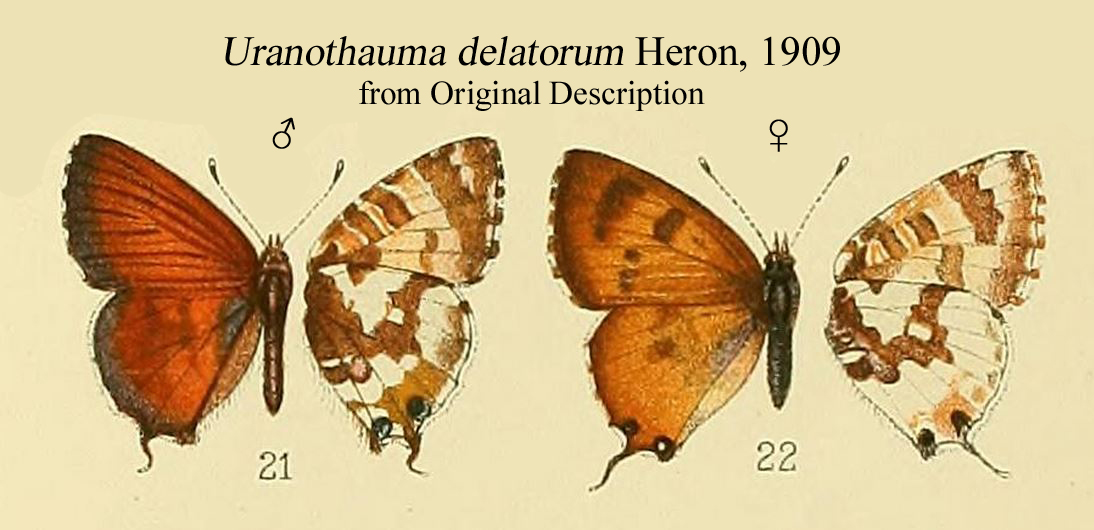
- Uranothaums delatorum, male, female, Uganda, from original description.

Scientific classification
- Kingdom: Animalia
- Phylum: Arthropoda
- Clade: Pancrustacea
- Class: Insecta
- Order: Lepidoptera
- Family: Lycaenidae
- Genus: Uranothauma
- Species: U. delatorum

Binomial name
- Uranothauma delatorum Heron, 1909

= Uranothauma delatorum =

Species of butterfly

Uranothauma delatorum is a butterfly in the family Lycaenidae. It is found in southern Sudan, Ethiopia, Uganda, Kenya (the western part of the country and the central highlands), the Democratic Republic of the Congo (from the eastern part of the country to Ituri and Kivu), Burundi and western and northern Tanzania. The habitat consists of forests.

Adult males mud-puddle and are attracted to cow and horse manure.

The larvae feed on Albizia gummifera and Acacia species.
