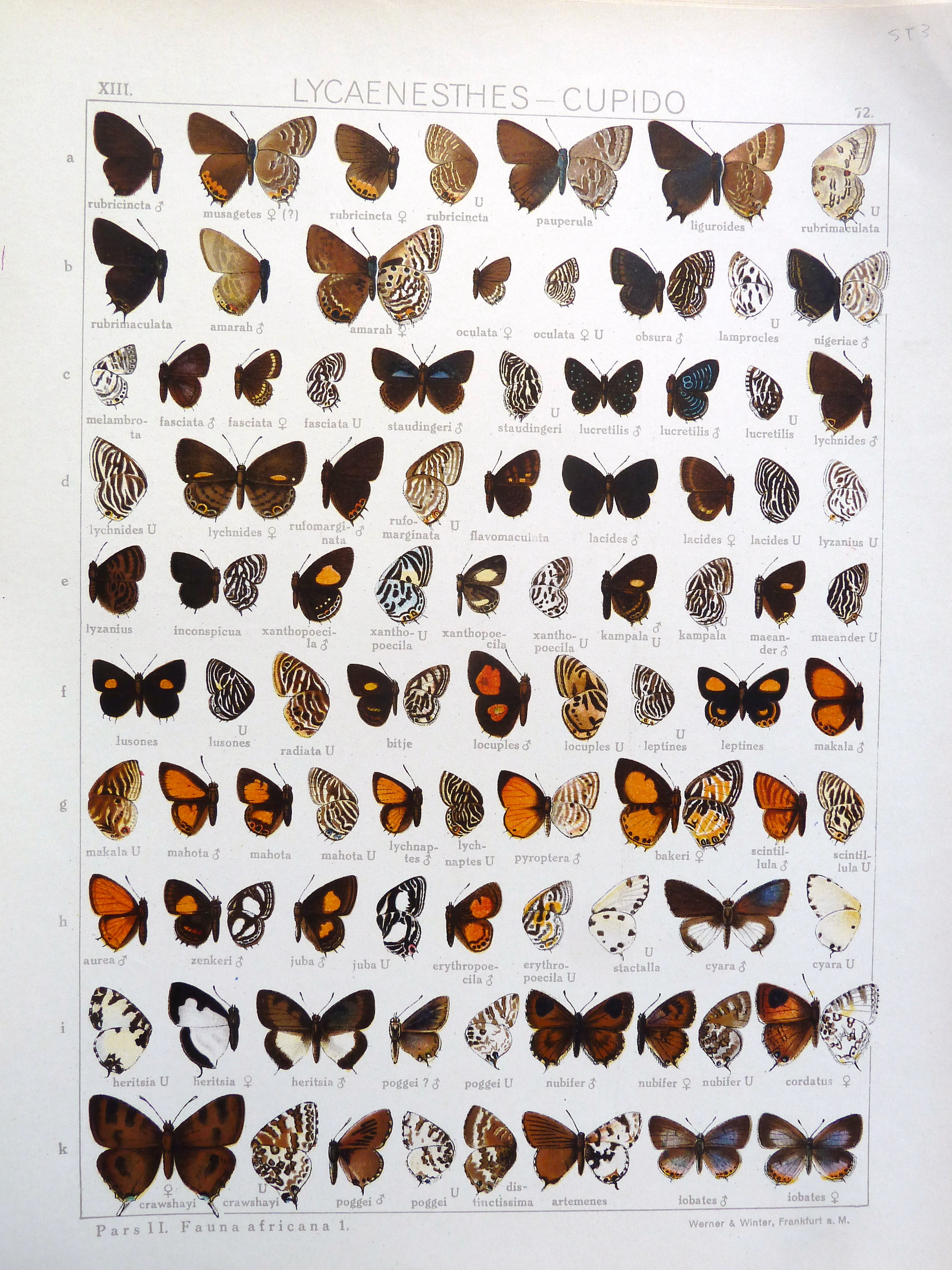
- k

Scientific classification
- Kingdom: Animalia
- Phylum: Arthropoda
- Clade: Pancrustacea
- Class: Insecta
- Order: Lepidoptera
- Family: Lycaenidae
- Genus: Uranothauma
- Species: U. artemenes

Binomial name
- Uranothauma artemenes (Mabille, 1880)

Synonyms
- Lycaena artemenes Mabille, 1880

= Uranothauma artemenes =

Species of butterfly

Uranothauma artemenes is a butterfly in the family Lycaenidae. It is found on Madagascar. The habitat consists of forests.
