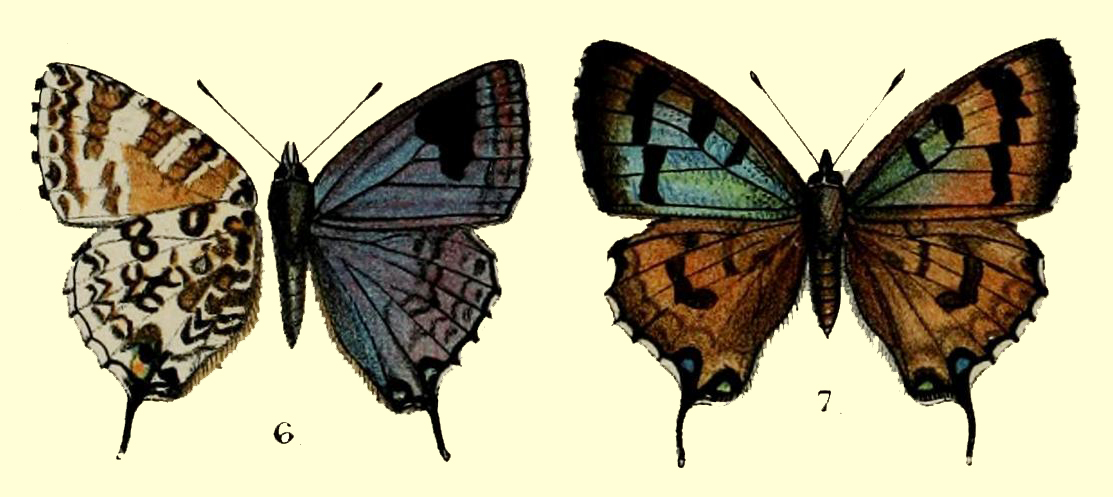
- Uranothauma crawshayi

Scientific classification
- Domain: Eukaryota
- Kingdom: Animalia
- Phylum: Arthropoda
- Class: Insecta
- Order: Lepidoptera
- Family: Lycaenidae
- Subfamily: Polyommatinae
- Tribe: Polyommatini
- Genus: Uranothauma; Butler, 1895

= Uranothauma =

Butterfly genus in family Lycaenidae

Uranothauma is a genus of butterflies in the family Lycaenidae. Its species are found in the Afrotropical realm.

Small to medium-sized (wingspan 27-40 millimetres) blues. The hindwings have a thin tail at the hind corner. The uppersides of the males are bluish, the females brown with darker spots. The undersides are brownish-white with brownish-orange transverse stripes and dark brown rings. Most of the species live in high-altitude (montane) forests. The larvae live mostly on the genera Acacia and Albizia (mimosa family), but can also occur on plants in the family Euphorbiaceae.

== Species ==
- Uranothauma antinorii (Oberthür, 1883)
- Uranothauma artemenes (Mabille, 1880)
- Uranothauma belcastroi Larsen, 1997
- Uranothauma confusa Kielland, 1989
- Uranothauma cordatus (Sharpe, 1892)
- Uranothauma crawshayi Butler, 1895
- Uranothauma cuneatum Tite, 1958
- Uranothauma delatorum Heron, 1909
- Uranothauma falkensteini (Dewitz, 1879)
- Uranothauma frederikkae Libert, 1993
- Uranothauma heritsia (Hewitson, 1876)
- Uranothauma kilimensis Kielland, 1985
- Uranothauma lukwangule Kielland, 1987
- Uranothauma lunifer (Rebel, 1914)
- Uranothauma nguru Kielland, 1985
- Uranothauma nubifer (Trimen, 1895)
- Uranothauma poggei (Dewitz, 1879)
- Uranothauma uganda Kielland, 1980
- Uranothauma usambarae Kielland, 1980
- Uranothauma vansomereni Stempffer, 1951
- Uranothauma williamsi Carcasson, 1961

Content in this edit is translated from the existing Norwegian Wikipedia article at no:Uranothauma; see its history for attribution.
