= Uranothauma confusa =

Scientific classification
- Kingdom: Animalia
- Phylum: Arthropoda
- Class: Insecta
- Order: Lepidoptera
- Family: Lycaenidae
- Genus: Uranothauma
- Species: U. confusa

Binomial name
- Uranothauma confusa Kielland, 1989

Species of butterfly

Uranothauma confusa is a butterfly in the family Lycaenidae. It is found in the Livingstone Mountains of Tanzania and in Malawi (the mountains in the south of the country, except Mount Mlanje).
