= Uranothauma poggei =

Scientific classification
- Kingdom: Animalia
- Phylum: Arthropoda
- Clade: Pancrustacea
- Class: Insecta
- Order: Lepidoptera
- Family: Lycaenidae
- Genus: Uranothauma
- Species: U. poggei

Binomial name
- Uranothauma poggei (Dewitz, 1879)

Synonyms
- Plebeius (Lampides) poggei Dewitz, 1879

Species of butterfly

Uranothauma poggei, the striped heart, is a butterfly in the family Lycaenidae. It is found in Uganda, western Kenya, the Democratic Republic of the Congo (Kivu, Lualaba and Shaba), western Tanzania, Malawi, northern Zambia, Angola, Mozambique and eastern Zimbabwe. The habitat consists of Brachystegia woodland and the edges of forests.

Adults are on wing from August to October and from February to May in two generations per year.

The larvae feed on Albizia gummifera.
