= Uranothauma lukwangule =

Scientific classification
- Kingdom: Animalia
- Phylum: Arthropoda
- Class: Insecta
- Order: Lepidoptera
- Family: Lycaenidae
- Genus: Uranothauma
- Species: U. lukwangule

Binomial name
- Uranothauma lukwangule Kielland, 1987

Species of butterfly

Uranothauma lukwangule is a butterfly in the family Lycaenidae. It is found in the southern Uluguru Mountains of Tanzania.
