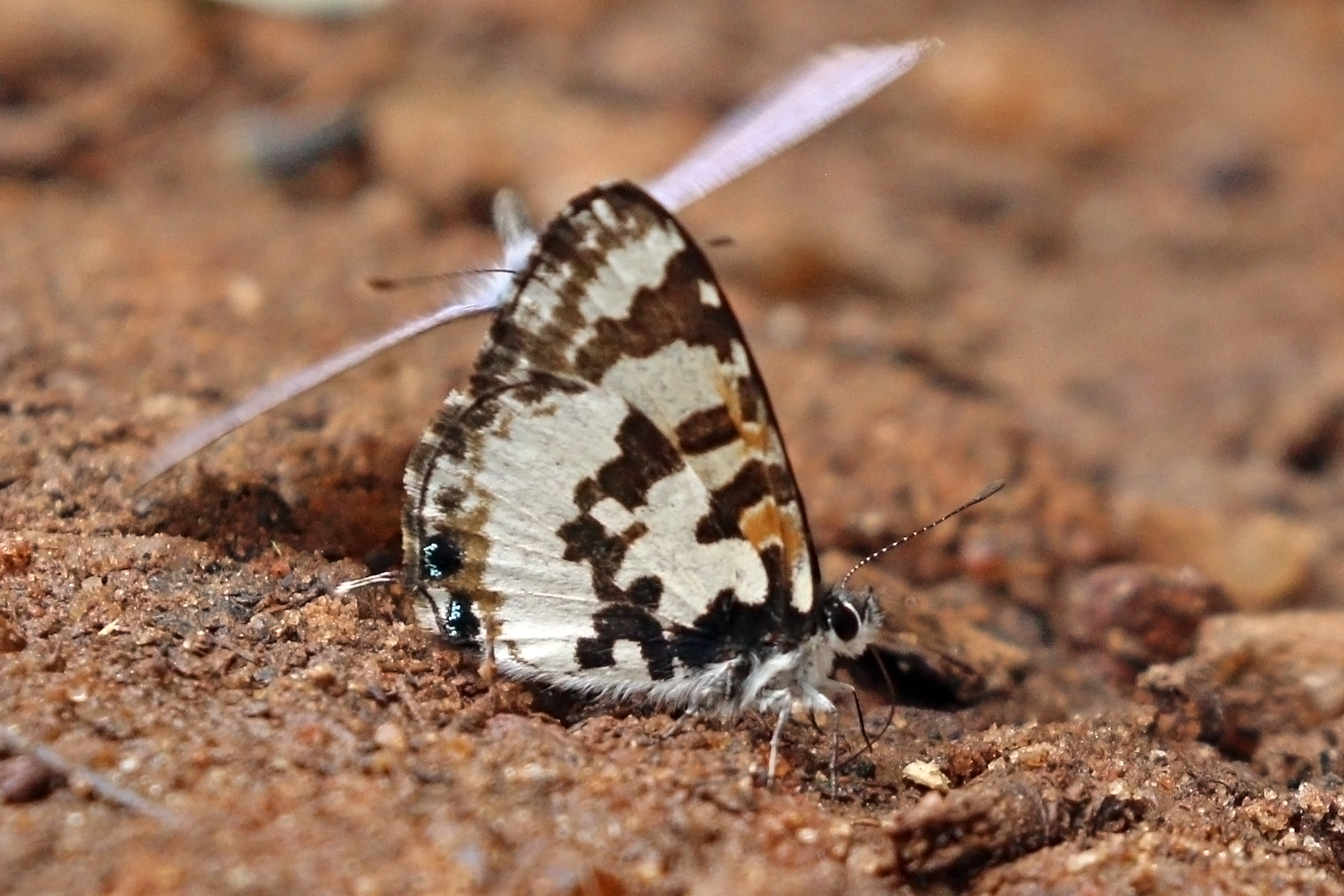
- Bobiri Forest in Ghana

Scientific classification
- Kingdom: Animalia
- Phylum: Arthropoda
- Clade: Pancrustacea
- Class: Insecta
- Order: Lepidoptera
- Family: Lycaenidae
- Genus: Uranothauma
- Species: U. falkensteini

Binomial name
- Uranothauma falkensteini (Dewitz, 1879)

Synonyms
- Plebeius (Lampides) falkensteini Dewitz, 1879; Uranothauma falkensteini f. umbra Talbot, 1935; Uranothauma falkensteini f. albescens Stoneham, 1937

= Uranothauma falkensteini =

Lowland branded blue

Species of butterfly

Uranothauma falkensteini, the lowland branded blue, is a butterfly in the family Lycaenidae.

== Range and habitat ==
It is found in Guinea, Sierra Leone, Liberia, Ivory Coast, Ghana, Togo, Nigeria (south and the Cross River loop), Cameroon, the Republic of the Congo, the Central African Republic, Angola, the DRC, Uganda, Kenya, Tanzania, Malawi, Zambia, Mozambique and Zimbabwe. The habitat consists of forests.

Torben Larsen developed a species numbering system for his 2005 publication Butterflies of West Africa. This species is #568. The 'Larsen' numbers have since been used with permission in A Sharp Eye on Butterflies of Ghana.
