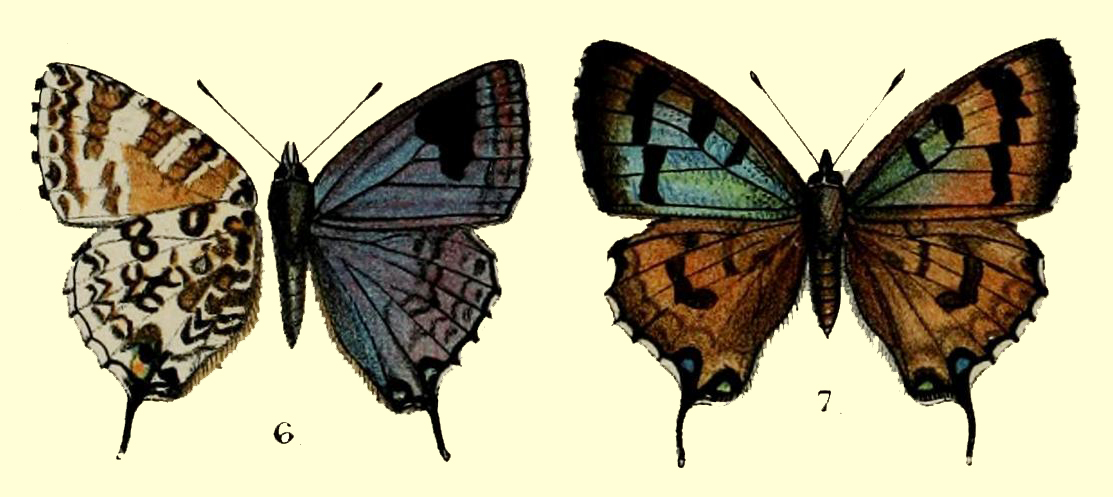

Scientific classification
- Domain: Eukaryota
- Kingdom: Animalia
- Phylum: Arthropoda
- Class: Insecta
- Order: Lepidoptera
- Family: Lycaenidae
- Genus: Uranothauma
- Species: U. crawshayi

Binomial name
- Uranothauma crawshayi Butler, 1895

Synonyms
- Uranothauma pseudocrawshayi Kielland, 1980

= Uranothauma crawshayi =

Species of butterfly

Uranothauma crawshayi is a butterfly in the family Lycaenidae. It is found in southern Tanzania, Malawi and eastern Zambia. The habitat consists of montane areas.

The larvae feed on Choristylis rhamnoides.
