= Walter Nyamilandu =

Malawian sports official and athlete (born 1971)

Walter Nyamilandu Manda
Personal information
- Full name: Walter MacMillan Nyamilandu Manda
- Date of birth: 11 November 1971 (age 54)
- Place of birth: Malawi
- Height: 1.88 m (6 ft 2 in)
- Position: Defender

Senior career*
Years	Team	Apps	(Gls)
- Mighty Wanderers FC

International career
1993–1997	Malawi	15	(0)
President of the Football Association of Malawi
In office 2004–2023
Preceded by	John Zingale
Succeeded by	Fleetwood Haiya
- * Club domestic league appearances and goals

Walter Nyamilandu Manda
- Education: Masters of Business Administration from the University of Reading Berkshire (United Kingdom)
- Occupations: Executive Committee Member, CAF & COSAFA.
- Employer(s): Confederation of African Football, COSAFA, Football Association of Malawi (2004-2023), FIFA (2018-2021), Illovo Sugar Plc (1999-2020).
- Spouse: Gillian Nyamilandu Manda

Walter Nyamilandu Manda is a Malawian Politician and international sports administrator, currently serving as a Member of Parliament and Executive Committee Member of the Confederation of African Football (CAF). He previously served as the President of the Football Association of Malawi as well as an Executive Member of FIFA's General Council.

Nyamilandu represented the Malawi national team, earning 15 caps and participating in the 1998 FIFA World Cup qualifiers. He was president of the Football Association of Malawi for a world record 17 years. Nyamilandu claimed victory in the 2004, 2007, 2011, 2015 and 2019 FAM general elections. He assured Malawi's return to the African Cup of Nations continental tournament twice during his tenure as president. Before taking up his role, Malawi had struggled to qualify for over 20 years.

Nyamilandu became the first Malawian in history and one of a few Africans to be elected onto the prestigious world football governing body, FIFA as an Executive Council member. Nyamilandu beat the president of the South African Football Association in a series of voting rounds to attain the council seat. He repeated history when he was voted into the continental sports governing body, CAF, in 2023. At the Football Association of Malawi elective general conference held at Mzuzu on 16 December 2023 he lost the Presidency of the Association to former Super League of Malawi President Fleetwood Haiya marking the end of a 19-year era.
