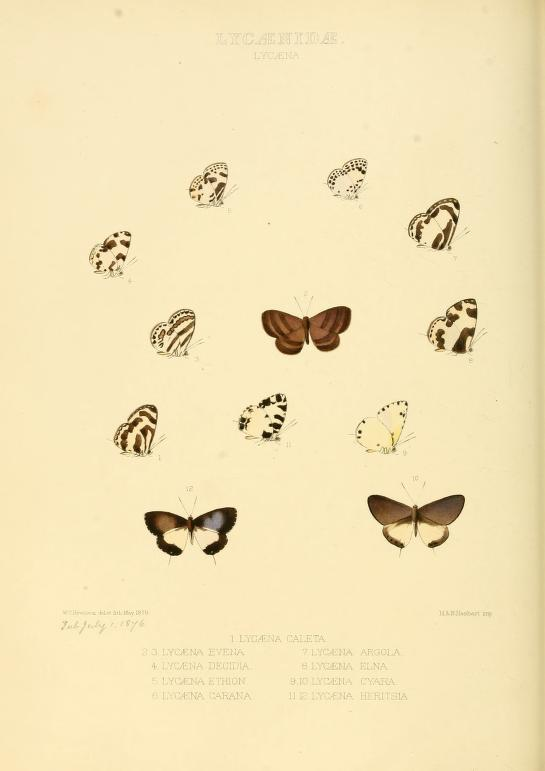

Scientific classification
- Domain: Eukaryota
- Kingdom: Animalia
- Phylum: Arthropoda
- Class: Insecta
- Order: Lepidoptera
- Family: Lycaenidae
- Genus: Uranothauma
- Species: U. heritsia

Binomial name
- Uranothauma heritsia (Hewitson, 1876)

Synonyms
- Lycaena heritsia Hewitson, 1876; Cupido chibonotana Aurivillius, 1910; Phlyaria heritsia intermedia Tite, 1958; Hyreus virgo Butler, 1896

= Uranothauma heritsia =

Species of butterfly

Uranothauma heritsia, the light branded blue, is a butterfly in the family Lycaenidae. It is found in south-eastern Nigeria, Cameroon, the Republic of the Congo, Angola, the Democratic Republic of the Congo, Sudan, Uganda, Kenya, Tanzania, Malawi and Zambia. The habitat consists of submontane forests and wooded habitats.

Adult males mud-puddle.

The larvae feed on the young leaves of Bridelia micrantha.

== Subspecies ==
- U. h. heritsia (south-eastern Nigeria, Cameroon, Congo, northern Angola, western and central Democratic Republic of the Congo)
- U. h. chibonotana (Aurivillius, 1910) (northern Tanzania)
- U. h. intermedia (Tite, 1958) (eastern Democratic Republic of the Congo, southern Sudan, Uganda, Kenya: west and the central highlands, western Tanzania)
- U. h. virgo (Butler, 1896) (southern and eastern Tanzania, Democratic Republic of the Congo: south to Shaba, Malawi, northern Zambia)
