= Gertrude Chirambo =

Malawian politician

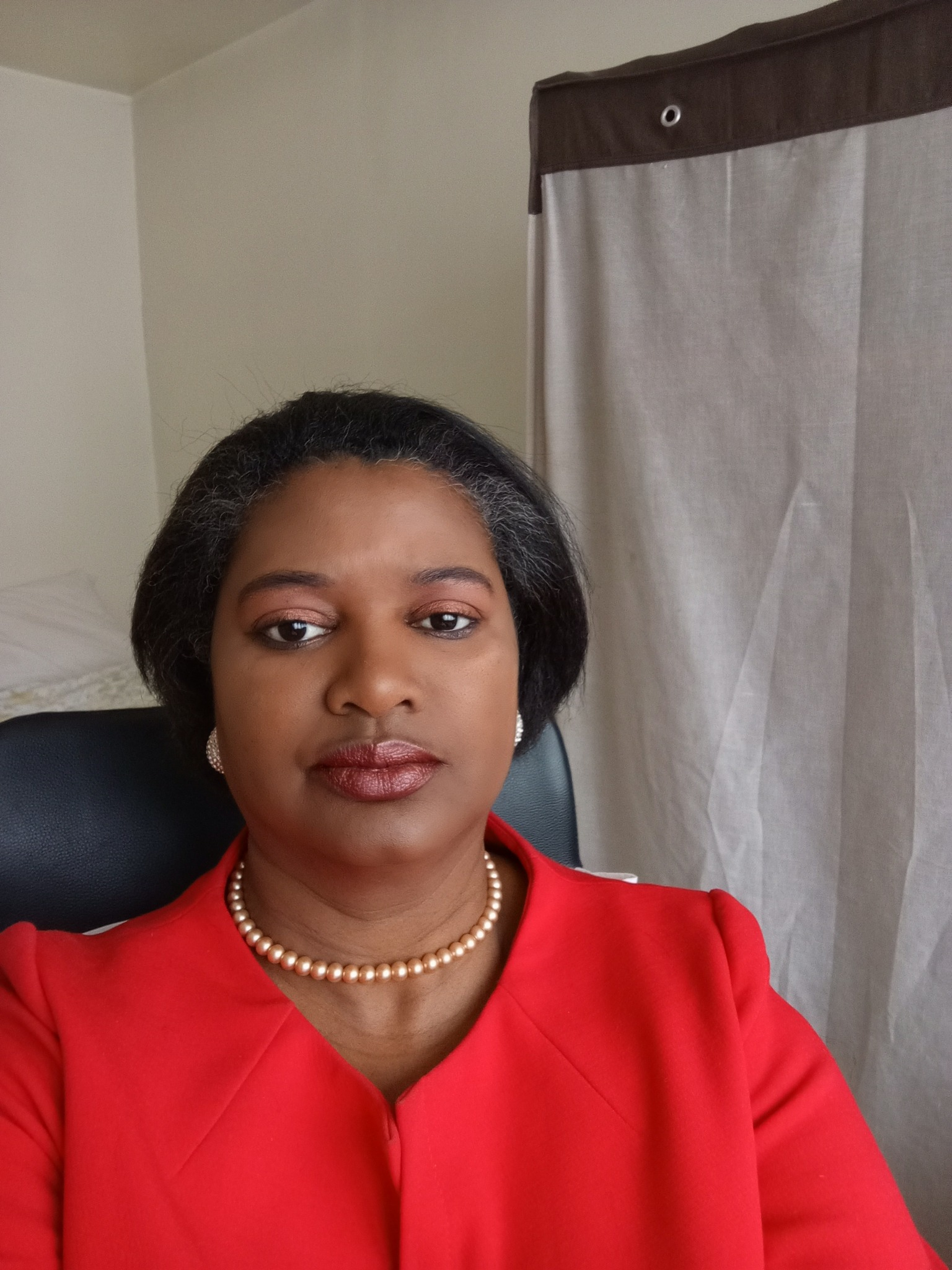
- Gertrude Chirambo in March 2026

Gertrude Lucy Edgar Chirambo is a Malawian local politician. Since 2014 she has been a councillor for Namalimwe Ward in Blantyre. Originally standing as an independent, she now represents the DPP. Chirambo has stood multiple times as a candidate to be the first female Mayor of Blantyre. She is a member of the United Cities and Local Governments (UCLG) World Council.

== Life ==
Chirambo lived in the United Kingdom for some years, serving as the vice-chairperson of Malawi Association UK. In 2012 she was the spokesperson for a Commonwealth Africa Night in London. While in the UK she established a twinning relationship between the Orion Primary School in London and Namalimwe school in Blantyre.

In 2014 Chirambo was elected an independent councillor for Namalimwe Ward in Blantyre. Later that year she stood as an independent candidate to be Mayor of Blantyre. Voting was delayed on election day, after clashes between police and DPP supporters calling for councillor Louis Ngalande to be included in the election. Chirambo only received one vote, and the private practice lawyer Noel Chalamanda was elected with 23 votes.

As ward councillor, Chirambo donated two laptops to Namalimwe schools in 2015.

In 2019 Chirambo, now representing the DPP, again stood as candidate to be Mayor of Blantyre. She promised to fight pollution of the city's rivers and streams, to improve on health service delivery and to engage corporate assistance in municipal waste management. She also called for reforestation of Ndirande and Soche hills by planting a million trees. She was unsuccessful, but this time gained five votes; Wild Ndipo was re-elected as mayor, with twenty votes. She and Ndipo together represented Malawi as members of the United Cities and Local Governments (UCLG) World Council.

Chirambo, continuing as a DPP ward councillor, stood again to be mayor of Blantyre in 2022. Ndipo won a third term: he gained eighteen votes, while Chiarmbo and Ndipo's former deputy Joseph Makwinja each received five.

In 2024, standing again to be Mayor, Chirambo gained fourteen votes but narrowly lost to Joseph Makwinja, who gained sixteen votes.
