= Cecilia Kadzamira =

First Lady of Malawi (born 1938)

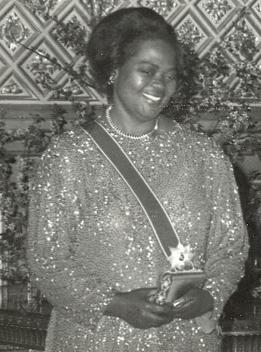

Official Hostess of Malawi
- In role 6 July 1964 – 24 May 1994
- President: Hastings Banda
- Preceded by: Position established
- Succeeded by: Annie Chidzira Muluzi (as First Lady of Malawi)

Personal details
- Born: Cecilia Tamanda Kadzamira; 25 June 1938 (age 88) Nkhoma Mission Hospital, Nyasaland (now Dedza District, Malawi)
- Party: Malawi Congress Party
- Profession: Nurse
- Nickname: "Mama"

Cecilia Tamanda Kadzamira, GCVO (born 25 June 1938) is the former official hostess of Malawi, serving during the leadership of president Hastings Banda. Whilst she and Banda were not officially married, she served as the first lady, or official hostess, for several years. For several years, she was the most powerful woman in Malawi. Kadzamira is referred to as "Mama" or "Mother of the Nation".

== Early life ==
She was born near Nkhoma in Nyasaland. In her early years, the family moved to Southern Rhodesia and lived in Old Highfield, Salisbury (now Harare) where she attended school at Mbizi Primary. After her GCE she enrolled at Salisbury Central Hospital as a cadet nurse where she qualified and was briefly posted to Old Highfields Clinic. When her father, John Kadzamira, returned home with his family, including David Zimani Kadzamira, she returned also to take up a posting in Malawi. She trained more at Zomba General Hospital. Later, she met and agreed to join Dr. Hastings Banda at his Limbe medical practice as a staff nurse. She is the niece of John Tembo.

== Early career ==
After working for Banda as a nurse at the Limbe Surgery, Kadzamira moved to Zomba State House as Banda's private secretary.

== Political career and influence ==
After the cabinet crisis in 1964, where Banda consolidated his political power, she was appointed the Official Government Hostess (OGH). This was suggested by Ismael Surtee, Banda's utmost closest associate and head speaker of Zomba, making him one of the most important figures in the government beneath Banda at that time. With his influence, Banda accepted. There is speculation of her role in the Machiavellian public trial and hanging of Albert Muwalo, the last MCP Secretary-General (thereafter the post was reduced to Administrative Secretary). After much resistance and ahead of the official visit by Jomo Kenyatta of Kenya and the Kenyan first lady Mama Ngina, Banda finally 'succumbed'. Kadzamira's name and title changed from OGH to Mama Tamanda C. Kadzamira, 'Mama' of the nation.

In quick succession and in line with her new first lady duties, Banda announced Kadzamira would run an organization called Chitukuko Cha Amayi muMalawi (CCAM), giving her more influence in Malawian politics and greater control over who had access to Banda. In 1974, when John Tembo, as chairman of the National Celebrations Council, transferred the venue of the Youth Week Inauguration venue it to Lilongwe without Banda's authority, Kadzamira pleaded with Banda and saved Tembo from express expulsion from the MCP. Instead, Tembo was relegated to the post of Governor of the Reserve Bank of Malawi, while Gwanda Chakuamba, then deputy commander-in-chief of the Malawi Young Pioneers, rose.

She made many decisions as Banda became older and could no longer run the affairs of the country. When Banda turned senile, she unsuccessfully tried to influence him to sponsor John Tembo as his successor in the party. Though Tembo had been acting in Banda's place in his absence, Banda handed the MCP political baton to Gwanda Chakuamba.

== Relationship with Banda ==
She was a confidante and friend of Hastings Banda from 1958. He had previously had a long term and adulterous relationship with Margaret Marene French. She was also a nurse and her husband named Banda as the correspondent in his divorce. Margaret had been with him since the second world war when he was a lodger at Margaret and her husband's house. She was with him too in Ghana.

Kadzamira's influence over his political and personal decisions played a significant role in the development of Banda and Malawi. The two friends were inseparable, and she influenced many aspects of his life such as who he had access to, reading materials, knowledge that was passed to him, and policies he signed.

When she and Banda were going through a difficult time, Banda banned the song "Cecilia" by Simon and Garfunkel because of its lyrics that hit too close to home, such as "Cecilia, I'm down on my knees, I'm beggin' you please to come home..."
