= Uranothauma cuneatum =

Scientific classification
- Domain: Eukaryota
- Kingdom: Animalia
- Phylum: Arthropoda
- Class: Insecta
- Order: Lepidoptera
- Family: Lycaenidae
- Genus: Uranothauma
- Species: U. cuneatum

Binomial name
- Uranothauma cuneatum Tite, 1958

Species of butterfly

Uranothauma cuneatum is a butterfly in the family Lycaenidae. It is found in Uganda, southern and western Tanzania, Malawi and eastern Zambia.

The larvae feed on Myrica species.
