= Chikangawa Forest Reserve =

Protected area in Malawi

Geography
- Location: Northern Region, Malawi
- Coordinates: 11.81°S 33.85°E
- Area: 1,147.8 km^{2} (443.2 mi^{2})

Administration
- Status: State-managed man-made forest reserve
- Established: 1948
- Governing body: Department of Forestry

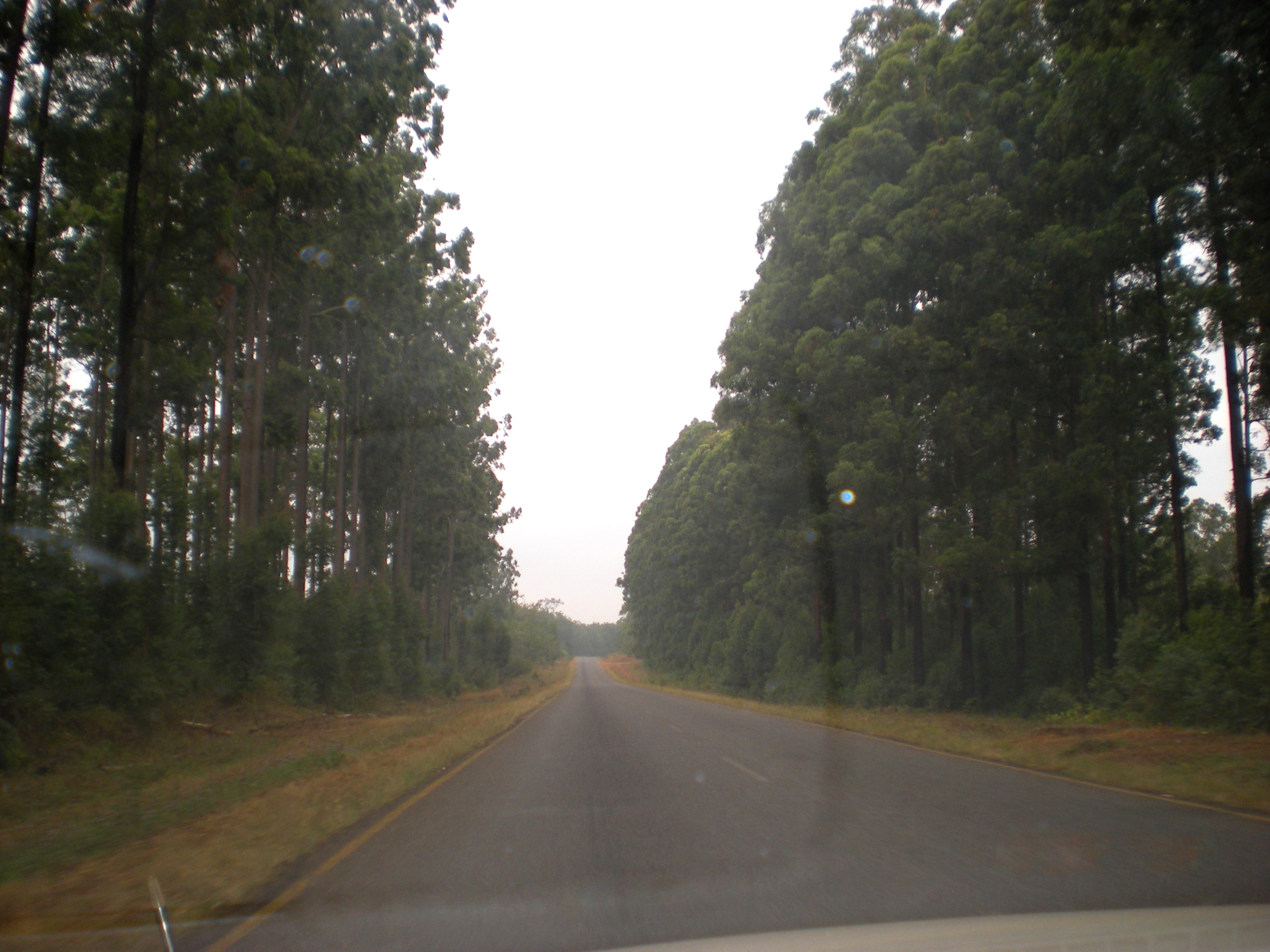
Chikangawa road from Mzuzu

Chikangawa Forest Reserve is a protected area in Chikangawa, Northern Malawi. It was established in 1948 and covers 1147.8 square kilometers. The forest is mainly composed of exotic pine trees. It is home to the Viphya Plantation, which was established in 1964 in a failed attempt to grow construction timber. The forest reserve is home to several native evergreen montane forests. The reserve was established to conserve the natural forests of the Viphya Mountains in Malawi. The forest provides a habitat for various plant and animal species, and supports sustainable forest management practices.

== History ==
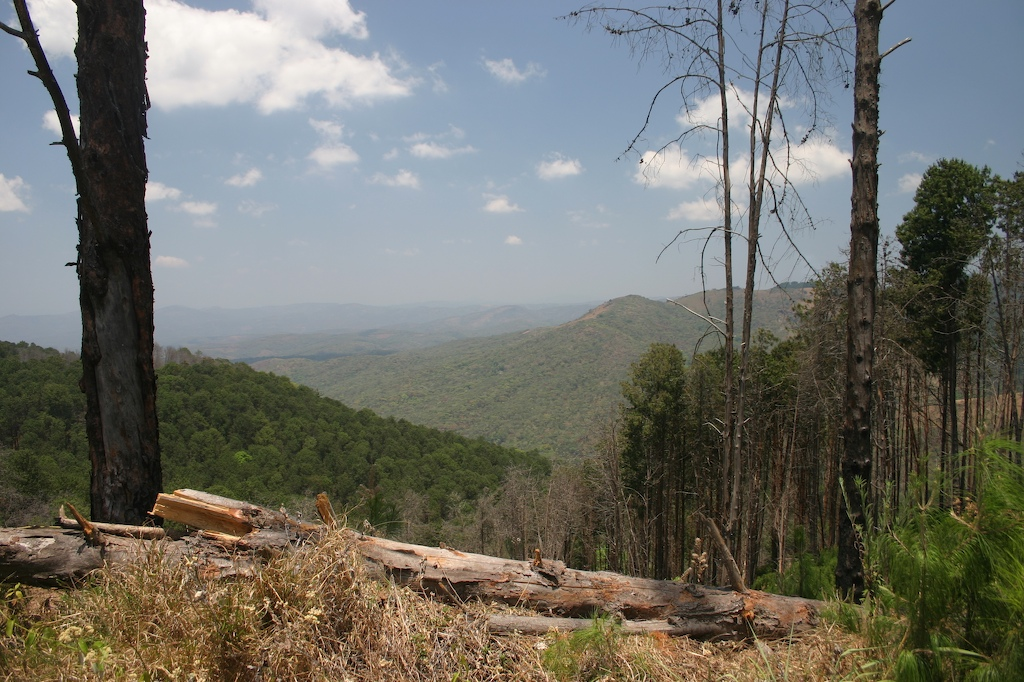
The north side of Chikangawa

Chikangawa Forest Reserve was established in 1948 as a protected area to conserve the natural forests of the Viphya Mountains in Malawi. The reserve was created to protect the indigenous forests and water sources in the area. Over the years, it has played a crucial role in maintaining the ecological balance of the region and providing timber and other forest products.

== Geography ==
It covers an area of approximately 1,150 square kilometers.

== Achievements ==
Chikangawa Forest Reserve has achieved significant milestones in conservation and sustainable forest management. It has maintained a high level of forest cover, providing habitat for various plant and animal species. The reserve has also supported local communities through sustainable forest management practices.

== Mission ==
The mission of the reserve is to conserve and manage the forest resources sustainably, while providing benefits to local communities and supporting national development. The vision of the reserve is to maintain a healthy and productive forest ecosystem that supports biodiversity conservation, sustainable forest management, and community development. The aim of Chikangawa Forest Reserve is to balance conservation and sustainable use of forest resources, ensuring the long-term health of the forest ecosystem.

== Management ==
The reserve is managed by the Department of Forestry, which is responsible for implementing conservation and management activities.

== Activities ==
The reserve supports various activities, including sustainable timber harvesting, ecotourism, and research. It also provides a habitat for various plant and animal species, including endangered species like the Mulanje cedar and the red colobus monkey.

== Incidents ==
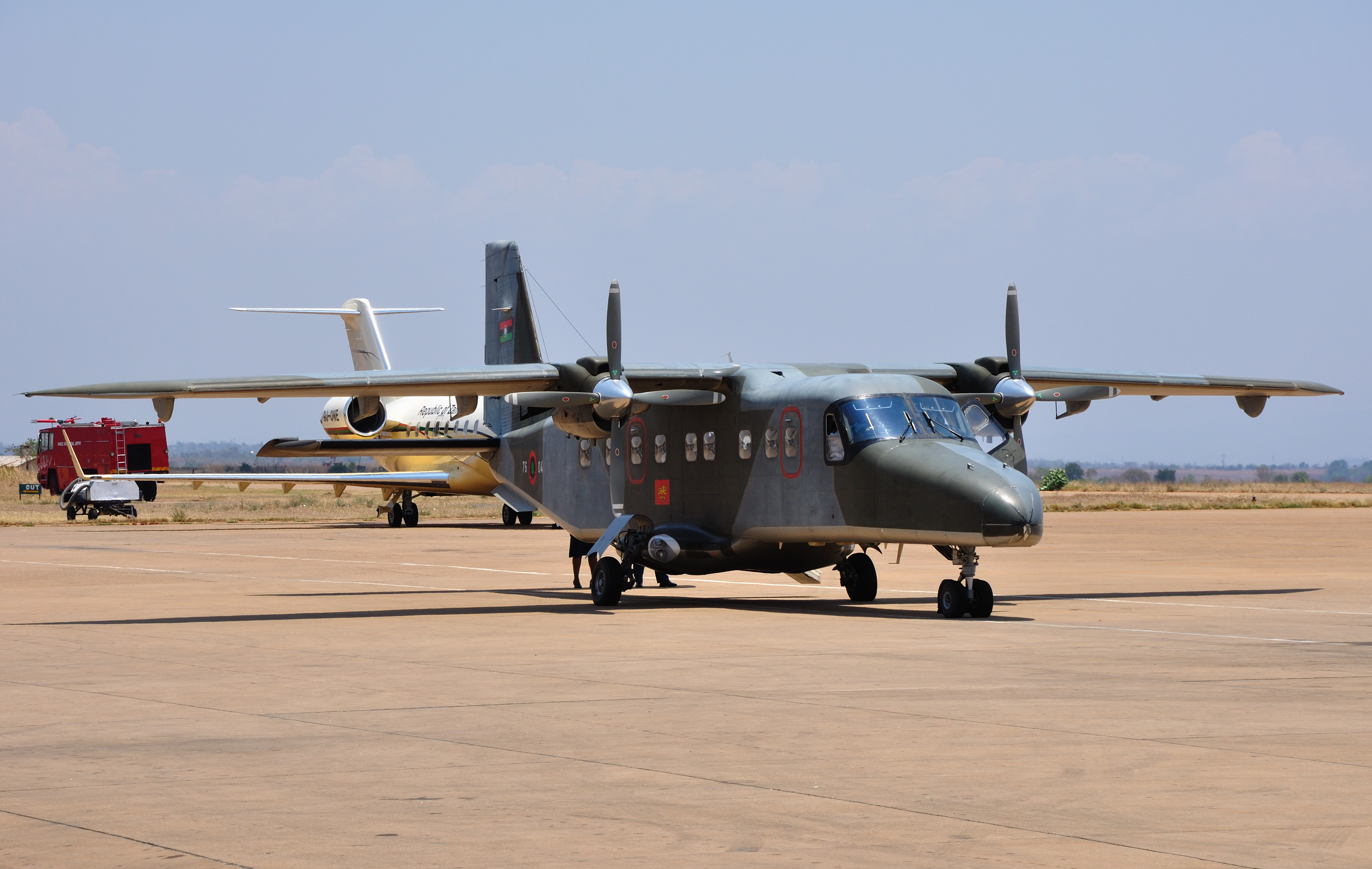
A Malawi Air Force Dornier 228, sister to the aircraft involved in the accident

On 10 June 2024, a Malawian Defence Force Dornier 228 carrying Vice-President of Malawi Saulos Chilima, former First Lady Patricia Shanil Muluzi, and seven other occupants, crashed in Chikangawa Forest Reserve in Nkhata Bay District; all on board died in Malawi's deadliest aviation accident.

At the time of the crash, the aircraft and its passengers were en route from Lilongwe to Mzuzu Airport in the Northern Region to attend a funeral.
