= Sylvester Namiwa =

Malawian human rights activist

- Citizenship: Malawian
- Occupations: Human rights activist; Executive Director of CDEDI
- Years active: 2018 - present
- Organization(s): Centre for Democracy and Economic Development Initiatives (CDEDI)
- Known for: Governance activism; transparency advocacy; public accountability campaigns
- Notable work: Civil society interventions on governance, democracy, and public inquiries

Sylvester Namiwa is a Malawian human rights activist and governance advocate. He is the executive director of the Centre for Democracy and Economic Development Initiatives (CDEDI), an organisation known for its activism on transparency, economic accountability, and democratic participation in Malawi.

== Career ==
Namiwa leads CDEDI, a Malawian civil society organisation that frequently engages government institutions on matters of transparency, public sector reforms, and economic governance.

== Commission of Inquiry into the 2024 plane crash ==
In October 2024, Namiwa was appointed by the President Lazarus Chakwera to serve as a commissioner on the inquiry investigating the June 2024 aircraft accident that killed Vice President Saulos Chilima and eight others. Soon after his appointment, Namiwa resigned from the commission, stating concerns about the transparency of its proceedings. He argued that witness testimonies should be accessible to the public and expressed dissatisfaction with procedural limitations that, in his view, undermined openness.

Following his resignation, he publicly criticised the inquiry process and questioned the credibility of its findings.

== Activism and incidents ==
Namiwa has participated in and organised several demonstrations addressing governance issues, high-level corruption, economic challenges, and public accountability. His activism has placed him in conflict with state authorities and political actors.

Over the years, he has reported receiving threats related to his work. He has also been physically attacked during some demonstrations, drawing widespread attention to security concerns faced by human rights activists in Malawi.

In June 2025, Namiwa was attacked by panga-wielding men in Lilongwe while leading demonstrations calling for the resignation of Malawi Electoral Commission officials. The assault occurred in the presence of the Police and Malawi Defence Force officers, who reportedly did not intervene. He was physically assaulted and sustained injuries before escaping when police eventually deployed tear gas to disperse the crowd.

== Public positions ==
In November 2025, Namiwa publicly argued that former president Lazarus Chakwera did not deserve the customary privileges of a former head of state. He criticised Chakwera for governance and corruption failures, state‑sanctioned violence, and misuse of public resources, and urged international bodies, including SADC and the Commonwealth, to withhold honorary roles until these issues were addressed.

== Awards and recognition ==
In December 2025, Namiwa was named Runner-Up Human Rights Defender of the Year during the national awards held in Mzuzu as part of Human Rights Day commemorations.

== See also ==
- Human rights in Malawi
