= Patricia Shanil Muluzi =

First Lady of Malawi from 1999 to 2004

Patricia Shanil Dzimbiri

Member of Parliament for Balaka West
- In office 9 June 2014 – May 2019

First Lady of Malawi
- In office 1999 – 24 May 2004
- President: Bakili Muluzi
- Preceded by: Annie Chidzira Muluzi
- Succeeded by: Ethel Mutharika

Personal details
- Born: Patricia Fukulani; 25 September 1964 Chimpikizo, Balaka District, Malawi
- Died: 10 June 2024 (aged 59) Chikangawa Forest Reserve, Malawi
- Cause of death: Plane crash
- Party: United Transformation Movement (since 2018)
- Other party: Independent (until 2018); United Democratic Front (former)
- Spouse: Bakili Muluzi (m. 1987; div. 2011)
- Children: 5
- Profession: School teacher

Patricia Shanil Dzimbiri (formerly Patricia Shanil Muluzi and Shanil Muluzi, née Patricia Fukulani; 25 September 1964 – 10 June 2024) was a Malawian politician, teacher, and First Lady of Malawi from 1999 until 2004 as the then-wife of former President Bakili Muluzi. She later represented the Balaka West Constituency in the National Assembly of Malawi from 2014 to 2019.

== Early and personal life ==
Dzimbiri was born Patricia Fukulani in the village of Chimpikizo, Traditional Authority Nsamala, Balaka District, Malawi, on 25 September 1964. She was the seventh child born to David and Sylvia Fukulani, a Roman Catholic couple from Chimpikizo.

Dzimbiri described herself as a "staunch Catholic" in a 2014 interview with The Nation newspaper.

== Marriage ==
Although the couple had been married in 1987 and when Muluzi was running for Presidency, she lived secretly and out of the public eye. After Bakili Muluzi became president in 1994, she lived in a presidential residence near Zomba. She made her first public appearance a day before the couple's second wedding.

Their second wedding took place in Malawi on 9 October 1999. Their lavish public wedding caused much criticism because the President's economic policies had led to a downturn in the economy. It included 3,000 guests, including Presidents Robert Mugabe of Zimbabwe, Frederick Chiluba of Zambia, Joaquim Chissano of Mozambique, Pierre Buyoya of Burundi, and King Mswati III of Swaziland. During the wedding, 29 cows were slaughtered. Free beer, food, and live music were made available in several hotels at cost to the state. The wedding was estimated to have cost 15 million kwacha ($335,000). The head of the wedding committee, Dumiso Mulani, noted that the president had spent some five million kwacha of his own money. The opposition, however, boycotted the event, and many mailed back their invitations in what Hetherwick Ntaba, secretary of the Malawi Congress Party and Alliance for Democracy called "the plunder of public money".

== Family ==
Muluzi had five children with Bakili Muluzi, twins, Carlucci and Edna born in 1988, followed by Zake born in 1989 and then Lucy born in 1990, finally with Tiyamike born in 1992. She was married to Muluzi in 1987 and became his second wife. As Muslims, Muluzi was married to Annie Muluzi at the time they got married and they were in a polygamous marriage arrangement. She became the second First Lady when Muluzi was elected president. Muluzi divorced his first wife, and the official First Lady, though in 1999 and remarried Patricia Muluzi in a lavish symbolic public nikkha ceremony that was criticized due to its cost in order to make her the official First Lady of Malawi. In 2011, Shanil announced that she was ending her marriage due to undisclosed reasons.

== Political career ==
Following her divorce from Muluzi, she utilized her maiden name, Patricia Shanil Dzimbiri, rather than her former husband's last name.

Dzimbiri was a schoolteacher. In 2014, Dzimbiri was elected to the National Assembly of Malawi, representing Balaka West, as an independent candidate, defeating five other candidates for the seat. She was sworn into office on 9 June 2014 at the New Parliament Building in Lilongwe.

Dzimbiri lost her 2019 re-election bid in Balaka West to Bertha Ndebele of the Democratic Progressive Party.

In July 2018, Dzimbiri became director of women for the newly established United Transformation Movement party (UTM). She also worked as the personal advisor on women's affairs to Vice President Saulos Chilima from 2020 until her death in June 2024.

== Death ==
On 10 June 2024, Dzimbiri was among nine people who disappeared after an aircraft carrying Vice-President Saulos Chilima disappeared from radar in Chikangawa Forest Reserve in Mzimba District while on their way to attend the funeral of former government minister Ralph Kasambara, prompting a search and rescue operation. Their aircraft was found to have crashed the next day, with authorities confirming the deaths of Muluzi and everyone else on board. She was buried on 14 June in Chimpikizo following a memorial ceremony that was attended by former presidents Bakili Muluzi and Joyce Banda.

== See also ==
- List of solved missing person cases (2020s)
