= First ladies and gentlemen of Malawi =

- Madona oyamba ndi njonda zaku Malawi

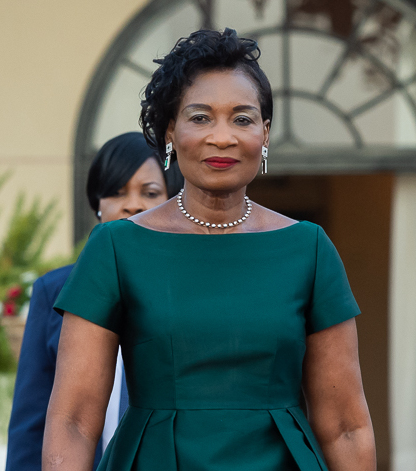
- Incumbent; Gertrude Maseko since October 4,2025
- Inaugural holder: Cecilia Kadzamira
- Formation: July 6, 1964

First Lady (Chichewa: Madona oyamba) or Gentleman of Malawi (Njonda zaku Malawi) is the official title held by the spouse of the president of Malawi, an office created in 1964. Malawi's current first lady is Gertrude Maseko, who has held the position since October 2025.

Cecilia Kadzamira was known as the "official hostess" of Malawi from 1964 until 1994, as then-President Kamuzu Banda was unmarried. The country's present first gentleman is Justice Richard Banda, who took office in April 2012.

== First ladies and gentlemen of Malawi ==
| Name | Portrait | Term begins | Term ends | President of Malawi | Notes |
|---|---|---|---|---|---|
| Cecilia Kadzamira | | 6 July 1964 | 24 May 1994 | Kamuzu Banda | Cecilia Kadzamira, who was not married to President Banda, was known as the Official Hostess of Malawi. |
| Annie Chidzira Muluzi | | 24 May 1994 | 1999 (Divorced in 1999) | Bakili Muluzi | Annie Chidzira Muluzi held the role of First Lady from 1994 to 1999. She and President Bakili Muluzi divorced in 1999. |
| Patricia Shanil Muluzi | | 1999 | 24 May 2004 | Bakili Muluzi | Bakili Muluzi and Patricia Shanil Muluzi, his second wife, had been married since 1987. They renewed their marriage in a public wedding in 1999, shortly after Muluzi's divorce from First Lady Annie Chidzira Muluzi, making her the country's official first lady. She died in the 2024 Chikangawa Dornier 228 crash along with Vice-President Saulos Chilima. |
| Ethel Mutharika | | 24 May 2004 | 28 May 2007 (Died in office) | Bingu wa Mutharika | First Lady Ethel Mutharika died in office in Lilongwe on 28 May 2007. |
| Position vacant | | 28 May 2007 | 1 May 2010 | Bingu wa Mutharika | President Bingu Mutharika was unmarried following the death of First Lady Ethel Mutharika. |
| Callista Mutharika | | 1 May 2010 | 5 April 2012 | Bingu wa Mutharika | Callista Mutharika married President Bingu Mutharika on May 1, 2010. She was first lady until President Bingu wa Mutharika's death in office in 2012. |
| Richard Banda | | 7 April 2012 | 31 May 2014 | Joyce Banda | Banda, the Chief Justice of Malawi from 1992 to 2002, was the first First Gentleman in Malawi's history. |
| Position technically vacant | | 31 May 2014 | 21 June 2014 | Peter Mutharika | Gertrude Maseko and President Bingu Mutharika did not marry until 21 June 2014, several weeks after he took office. |
| Gertrude Maseko | | 21 June 2014 | 28 June 2020 | Peter Mutharika | Gertrude Maseko previously served as a member of the National Assembly, representing the Balaka North constituency, from 2009 until 2014. She married President Peter Mutharika on 21 June 2014, several weeks after he took office, becoming Malawi's official First Lady. |
| Monica Chakwera | | 28 June 2020 | 4 October 2025 | Lazarus Chakwera | |
| Gertrude Maseko | | 4 October 2025 | Incumbent | Peter Mutharika | |

== See also ==
- President of Malawi
