= Nkhata Bay District =

District of Malawi

Coordinates: 11°30′S 34°00′E

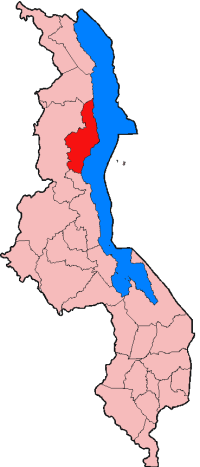
Location of Nkhata Bay District in Malawi

Nkhata Bay is a district in the Northern Region of Malawi. The capital is Nkhata Bay. The district covers an area of 4,071 km² and has a population of 164,761.

Lake Malawi bounds the district on the east. The western portion of the district lies in the Viphya Mountains.

The major ethnic groups are the remnants of the Tumbuka people known as the Tonga and Tumbuka people. The Tonga and Tumbuka people are one group that emerged from the Nkhamanga Kingdom when it started to decline.

Main languages spoken in the district include Chitumbuka and Chitonga (part of Chitumbuka language family).

== History ==
Nkhata-Bay was originally inhabited by the Tumbuka people in the early 16th Century and the area was part of the Nkhamanga Empire. The breakaway of the Tumbuka people due to wars and in search for food and water led to some groups to settle in different places, which later were divided as districts by colonial powers. After some time, these people eventually had a slight change in culture.

== Government and administrative divisions ==
There are six National Assembly constituencies in Nkhata Bay:

- Nkhata Bay - Central
- Nkhata Bay - North
- Nkhata Bay - North West
- Nkhata Bay - South
- Nkhata Bay - South East
- Nkhata Bay - West

== Demographics ==
At the time of the 2024 Census of Malawi, the distribution of the population of Nkhata Bay District by ethnic group was as follows:

- 45.2% Tonga
- 34.7% Tumbuka
- 2.6% Nkhonde
- 1.4% Chewa
- 1.3% Lomwe
- 1.1% Ngoni
- 0.9% Yao
- 0.7% Sukwa
- 0.7% Lambya
- 0. 2% Sena
- 1.3% Others

== Culture ==
Nkhata Bay is populated by the Tonga and Tumbuka people, who are part of one large Tumbuka group. However, some parts such as Usisya has mostly Tumbuka people. Other languages like Nkhonde, Lambya, and Chichewa are also spoken. Other tribes exist but are found in small groups and are not permanent. The district also has white immigrants who come to visit the lake.

== Economy ==
The majority of the people in the district are agriculturalists growing cassava, which is their staple food. Apart from cassava they also grow groundnuts, bananas, maize, pigeon peas and millet. The people along the lake earn their living through fishing. They catch usipa, batala, utaka, bombe among others.

== Notable residents ==
- Edgar Ching'oli Chirwa - Architect of Malawi Congress Party
- Kanyama Chiume - Minister of Education and made strides to improve the Malawi Education Curriculum
- Yesaya Zelenji Mwase - father and founder of the Blackman's Church of African Presbytery now changed to Church of Africa Presbytery with Ching'oma as his church's headquarters. Great Angels Choir is a daughter of this church but is based in Lilongwe with Rev. Zonda as its current General Secretary.
- Manowa Chirwa
- Aleke Kadonaphani Banda-one of the district's most popular politicians. Was the district's youngest person to go into journalism and is the brainchild of Blantyre Newspapers which came after Nyasaland Times.
- Clements Kadalie, Trade Union leader in South Africa.
- Wiseman Chijere Chirwa: professor
- Wisdom Achimalemba Mawowa - Initiated Youth Education Network project. This is an educational project that seeks to put Malawian primary and secondary school content on digital by making video lessons available on YouTube and share to schools and individuals for free.
- Richard Banda SC is a Malawian barrister and former athlete. He is a judge who formerly served as Chief Justice of Malawi and Swaziland and as Minister of Justice in Malawi. He was president of the Commonwealth Magistrates' and Judges' Association and Commonwealth Secretariat Arbitral Tribunal. As a sportsman, Banda was a track and field athlete and soccer player. He is the spouse of the former President of Malawi, Joyce Banda and, as such, was the First Gentleman.

== Gallery ==
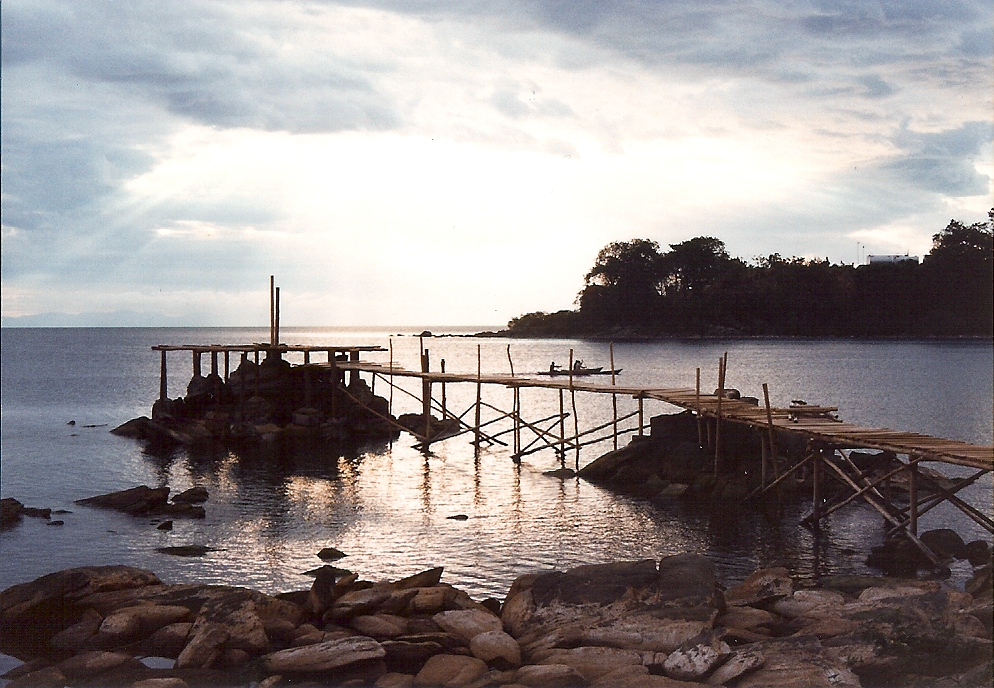
Lake Malawi at Nkhata Bay

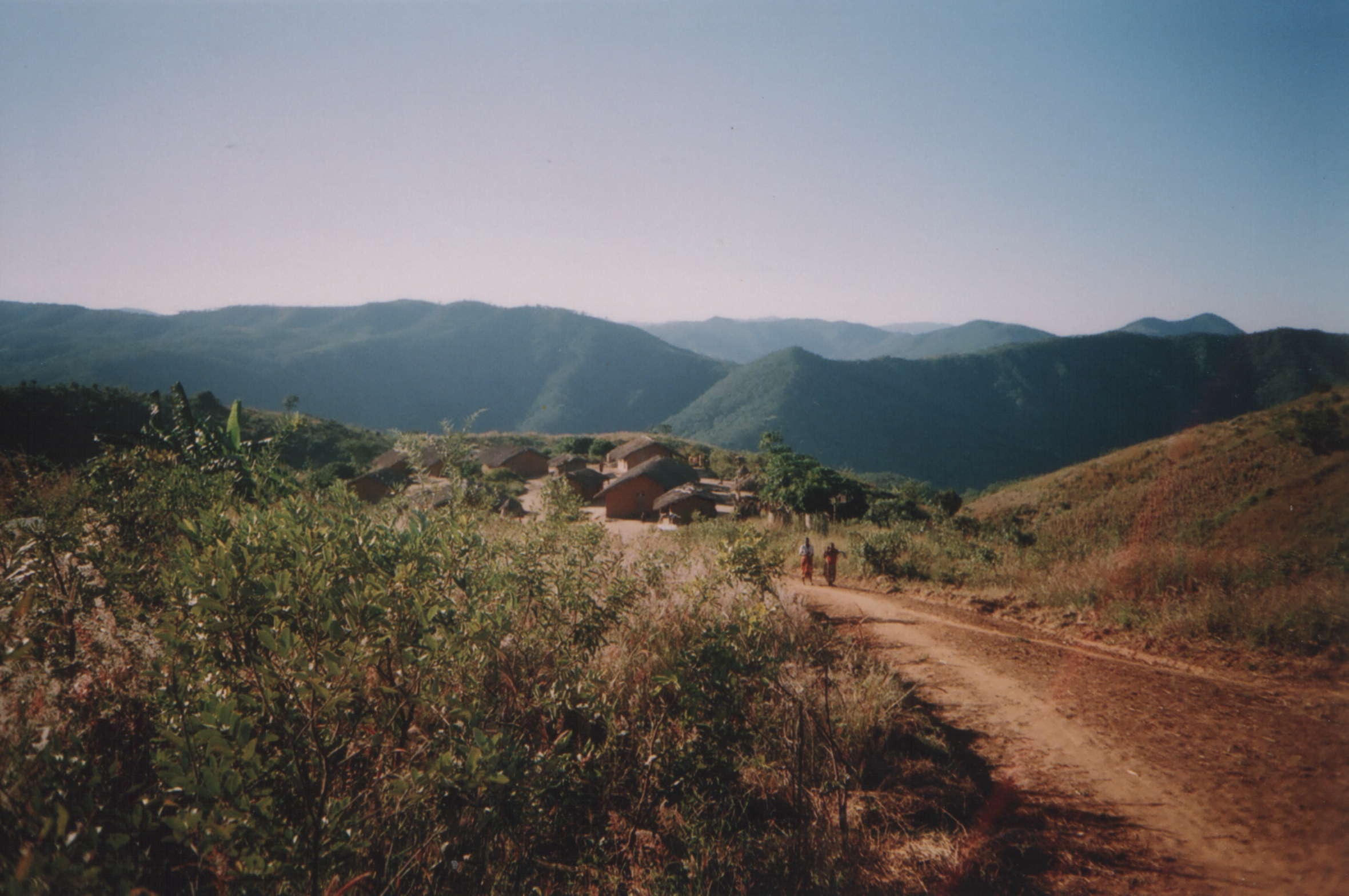
Nkhata Bay District, North of Nkhata Bay
