= List of butterflies of Somaliland =

Location of the Republic of Somaliland

This is a list of butterflies of Somaliland. About 131 species are known from Somaliland, five of which are endemic.

== Papilionidae ==
=== Papilioninae ===
==== Papilionini ====
- Papilio nireus pseudonireus Felder & Felder, 1865
- Papilio dardanus byatti Poulton, 1926
- Papilio constantinus Ward, 1871
- Papilio microps Storace, 1952

==== Leptocercini ====
- Graphium colonna (Ward, 1873)

== Pieridae ==
=== Coliadinae ===
- Eurema brigitta (Stoll, [1780])
- Eurema hecabe solifera (Butler, 1875)
- Colias electo pseudohecate Berger, 1940

=== Pierinae ===
- Colotis aurora evarne (Klug, 1829)
- Colotis celimene praeclarus (Butler, 1886)
- Colotis chrysonome (Klug, 1829)
- Colotis daira stygia (Felder & Felder, 1865)
- Colotis danae eupompe (Klug, 1829)
- Colotis danae pseudacaste (Butler, 1876)
- Colotis euippe complexivus (Butler, 1886)
- Colotis euippe exole (Reiche, 1850)
- Colotis evenina casta (Gerstaecker, 1871)
- Colotis fausta mijurteina Carpenter, 1951
- Colotis halimede restricta Talbot, 1939
- Colotis hetaera lorti (Sharpe, 1896)
- Colotis liagore (Klug, 1829)
- Colotis phisadia phisadia (Godart, 1819)
- Colotis phisadia somalica Storace, 1948
- Colotis pleione heliocaustus (Butler, 1886)
- Colotis protomedia (Klug, 1829) – yellow splendour tip
- Colotis regina (Trimen, 1863)
- Colotis venosa (Staudinger, 1885)
- Colotis vesta (Reiche, 1850)
- Colotis vestalis castalis (Staudinger, 1884)
- Colotis agoye zephyrus (Marshall, 1897)
- Pinacopterix eriphia melanarge (Butler, 1886)
- Nepheronia buquetii (Boisduval, 1836)
- Euchloe belemia abyssinica Riley, 1928
- Euchloe falloui (Allard, 1867)

==== Pierini ====
- Pontia distorta (Butler, 1886)
- Pontia glauconome Klug, 1829
- Mylothris agathina (Cramer, 1779)
- Belenois aurota (Fabricius, 1793)
- Belenois creona benadirensis (Storace, 1948)
- Belenois rubrosignata peeli Dixey, 1900
- Belenois thysa tricolor Talbot, 1943

== Lycaenidae ==
=== Poritiinae ===
==== Liptenini ====
- Alaena johanna Sharpe, 1890
- Ornipholidotos peucetia peuceda (Grose-Smith, 1889)
- Baliochila fragilis Stempffer & Bennett, 1953

=== Aphnaeinae ===
- Chloroselas arabica (Riley, 1932)
- Chloroselas esmeralda Butler, 1886
- Chloroselas ogadenensis Jackson, 1966 (endemic)
- Cesa waggae (Sharpe, 1898) (endemic)
- Cigaritis acamas bellatrix (Butler, 1886)
- Cigaritis gilletti (Riley, 1925) (endemic)
- Cigaritis somalina (Butler, 1886)
- Axiocerses harpax kadugli Talbot, 1935
- Axiocerses jacksoni Stempffer, 1948
- Aphnaeus hutchinsonii Trimen & Bowker, 1887

=== Theclinae ===
- Hypolycaena liara Druce, 1890
- Leptomyrina gorgias sobrina Talbot, 1935
- Iolaus glaucus Butler, 1886
- Iolaus mimosae berbera (Bethune-Baker, 1924)
- Iolaus tajoraca Walker, 1870
- Iolaus umbrosa (Butler, 1886)
- Iolaus crawshayi maureli Dufrane, 1954
- Stugeta bowkeri albeza (Koçak, 1996)
- Stugeta somalina Stempffer, 1946
- Deudorix livia (Klug, 1834)

=== Polyommatinae ===
==== Lycaenesthini ====
- Anthene contrastata turkana Stempffer, 1936
- Anthene crawshayi minuta (Bethune-Baker, 1916)
- Anthene janna Gabriel, 1949
- Anthene opalina Stempffer, 1946
- Anthene otacilia dulcis (Pagenstecher, 1902)
- Anthene pitmani somalina Stempffer, 1936

==== Polyommatini ====
- Tuxentius cretosus lactinatus (Butler, 1886)
- Tarucus grammicus (Grose-Smith & Kirby, 1893)
- Tarucus kulala Evans, 1955
- Tarucus legrasi Stempffer, 1948
- Tarucus quadratus Ogilvie-Grant, 1899
- Tarucus rosacea (Austaut, 1885)
- Tarucus theophrastus (Fabricius, 1793)
- Azanus jesous (Guérin-Méneville, 1849)
- Euchrysops brunneus Bethune-Baker, 1923
- Euchrysops lois (Butler, 1886)
- Euchrysops migiurtiniensis Stempffer, 1946 (endemic)
- Euchrysops nilotica (Aurivillius, 1904)
- Chilades naidina (Butler, 1886)
- Lepidochrysops fumosa (Butler, 1886)
- Lepidochrysops polydialecta (Bethune-Baker, [1923])

== Nymphalidae ==
=== Danainae ===
==== Danaini ====
- Danaus dorippus (Klug, 1845)
- Tirumala formosa neumanni (Rothschild, 1902)
- Amauris albimaculata hanningtoni Butler, 1888
- Amauris ochlea darius Rothschild & Jordan, 1903

=== Satyrinae ===
==== Satyrini ====
- Lasiommata maderakal (Guérin-Méneville, 1849)
- Bicyclus anynana (Butler, 1879)
- Ypthima jacksoni Kielland, 1982
- Ypthima simplicia Butler, 1876
- Neocoenyra duplex Butler, 1886
- Neocoenyra fulleborni Thurau, 1903
- Neocoenyra rufilineata Butler, 1894 (endemic)
- Physcaeneura leda (Gerstaecker, 1871)

=== Charaxinae ===
==== Charaxini ====
- Charaxes jasius Poulton, 1926
- Charaxes epijasius Reiche, 1850
- Charaxes jasius pagenstecheri Poulton, 1926
- Charaxes hansali Felder, 1867
- Charaxes etesipe patrizii Storace, 1949
- Charaxes zoolina (Westwood, [1850])

=== Nymphalinae ===
==== Nymphalini ====
- Junonia terea fumata (Rothschild & Jordan, 1903)
- Precis coelestina Dewitz, 1879
- Precis limnoria (Klug, 1845)
- Precis octavia (Cramer, 1777)
- Hypolimnas deceptor (Trimen, 1873)
- Hypolimnas misippus (Linnaeus, 1764)

=== Biblidinae ===
==== Biblidini ====
- Byblia anvatara acheloia (Wallengren, 1857)

=== Limenitinae ===
==== Adoliadini ====
- Bebearia orientis (Karsch, 1895)
- Euphaedra neophron ellenbecki Pagenstrecher, 1902

=== Heliconiinae ===
==== Acraeini ====
- Acraea anemosa Hewitson, 1865
- Acraea chilo Godman, 1880
- Acraea neobule Doubleday, 1847
- Acraea braesia Godman, 1885
- Acraea doubledayi Guérin-Méneville, 1849
- Acraea mirabilis Butler, 1886
- Acraea miranda Riley, 1920
- Acraea oncaea Hopffer, 1855
- Acraea serena (Fabricius, 1775)

== Hesperiidae ==
=== Coeliadinae ===
- Coeliades anchises (Gerstaecker, 1871)
- Coeliades forestan (Stoll, [1782])
- Coeliades pisistratus (Fabricius, 1793)

=== Pyrginae ===
==== Celaenorrhinini ====
- Sarangesa phidyle (Walker, 1870)

==== Tagiadini ====
- Abantis meneliki Berger, 1979

==== Carcharodini ====
- Spialia colotes semiconfluens de Jong, 1978
- Spialia doris (Walker, 1870)
- Spialia mafa higginsi Evans, 1937
- Spialia mangana (Rebel, 1899)

=== Hesperiinae ===
==== Aeromachini ====
- Kedestes callicles (Hewitson, 1868)

=== Heteropterinae ===
- Metisella willemi (Wallengren, 1857)

== See also ==
- List of moths of Somaliland
- Wildlife of Somaliland
