= List of butterflies of Ethiopia =

Location of Ethiopia

This is a list of butterflies of Ethiopia. About 376 species are known from Ethiopia, 33 of which are endemic.

== Papilionidae ==
=== Papilioninae ===
==== Papilionini ====
- Papilio nireus pseudonireus Felder & Felder, 1865
- Papilio wilsoni Rothschild, 1926
- Papilio arnoldiana Vane-Wright, 1995
- Papilio dardanus antinorii Oberthür, 1883
- Papilio constantinus Ward, 1871
- Papilio rex abyssinicana Vane-Wright, 1995
- Papilio rex franciscae Carpenter, 1928
- Papilio echerioides leucospilus Rothschild, 1902
- Papilio echerioides oscari Rothschild, 1902
- Papilio microps Storace, 1952

==== Leptocercini ====
- Graphium antheus (Cramer, 1779)
- Graphium colonna (Ward, 1873)
- Graphium angolanus baronis (Ungemach, 1932)
- Graphium leonidas (Fabricius, 1793)
- Graphium philonoe whalleyi (Talbot, 1929)
- Graphium almansor birbiri (Ungemach, 1932)

== Pieridae ==
=== Pseudopontiinae ===
- Pseudopontia mabira Mitter & Collins, 2010

=== Coliadinae ===
- Eurema brigitta (Stoll, [1780])
- Eurema desjardinsii marshalli (Butler, 1898)
- Eurema regularis (Butler, 1876)
- Eurema hecabe solifera (Butler, 1875)
- Catopsilia florella (Fabricius, 1775)
- Colias electo meneliki Berger, 1940
- Colias electo pseudohecate Berger, 1940
- Colias marnoana Rogenhofer, 1884

=== Pierinae ===
- Colotis antevippe zera (Lucas, 1852)
- Colotis aurora evarne (Klug, 1829)
- Colotis celimene celimene (Lucas, 1852)
- Colotis celimene praeclarus (Butler, 1886)
- Colotis chrysonome (Klug, 1829)
- Colotis daira stygia (Felder & Felder, 1865)
- Colotis danae eupompe (Klug, 1829)
- Colotis danae pseudacaste (Butler, 1876)
- Colotis euippe exole (Reiche, 1850)
- Colotis evenina casta (Gerstaecker, 1871)
- Colotis halimede halimede (Klug, 1829)
- Colotis halimede restricta Talbot, 1939
- Colotis hetaera aspasia (Ungemach, 1932)
- Colotis hetaera lorti (Sharpe, 1896)
- Colotis liagore (Klug, 1829)
- Colotis phisadia phisadia (Godart, 1819)
- Colotis phisadia ocellatus (Butler, 1886)
- Colotis pleione heliocaustus (Butler, 1886)
- Colotis protomedia (Klug, 1829)
- Colotis rogersi (Dixey, 1915)
- Colotis ungemachi (Le Cerf, 1922)
- Colotis venosa (Staudinger, 1885)
- Colotis vesta (Reiche, 1850)
- Colotis vestalis castalis (Staudinger, 1884)
- Colotis agoye zephyrus (Marshall, 1897)
- Eronia cleodora Hübner, 1823
- Eronia leda (Boisduval, 1847)
- Pinacopterix eriphia melanarge (Butler, 1886)
- Pinacopterix eriphia tritogenia (Klug, 1829)
- Nepheronia buquetii (Boisduval, 1836)
- Nepheronia thalassina sinalata (Suffert, 1904)
- Euchloe belemia abyssinica Riley, 1928
- Leptosia alcesta inalcesta Bernardi, 1959
- Leptosia alcesta pseudonuptilla Bernardi, 1959

==== Pierini ====
- Appias epaphia contracta (Butler, 1888)
- Appias phaola intermedia Dufrane, 1948
- Appias sabina (Felder & Felder, [1865])
- Appias sylvia abyssinica Talbot, 1932
- Pieris brassicoides Guérin-Méneville, 1848
- Pontia daplidice aethiops (de Joannis & Verity, 1913)
- Pontia distorta (Butler, 1886)
- Pontia glauconome Klug, 1829
- Mylothris agathina (Cramer, 1779)
- Mylothris erlangeri Pagenstecher, 1902
- Mylothris jacksoni nagichota Talbot, 1944
- Mylothris mortoni mortoni Blachier, 1912
- Mylothris mortoni balkis Ungemach, 1932
- Mylothris rubricosta (Mabille, 1890)
- Mylothris rueppellii (Koch, 1865)
- Mylothris sagala swaynei Butler, 1899
- Mylothris yulei amhara Ungemach, 1932
- Dixeia charina septentrionalis Bernardi, 1958
- Dixeia dixeyi (Neave, 1904)
- Dixeia doxo venatus (Butler, 1871)
- Dixeia orbona vidua (Butler, 1900)
- Dixeia pigea (Boisduval, 1836)
- Belenois aurota (Fabricius, 1793)
- Belenois creona creona (Cramer, [1776])
- Belenois creona boguensis (Felder & Felder, 1865)
- Belenois gidica abyssinica (Lucas, 1852)
- Belenois gidica hypoxantha (Ungemach, 1932)
- Belenois raffrayi (Oberthür, 1878)
- Belenois solilucis loveni (Aurivillius, 1921)
- Belenois subeida hailo (Ungemach, 1932)
- Belenois thysa tricolor Talbot, 1943
- Belenois zochalia galla (Ungemach, 1932)

== Lycaenidae ==
=== Miletinae ===
==== Miletini ====
- Spalgis lemolea Druce, 1890
- Lachnocnema abyssinica Libert, 1996
- Lachnocnema emperamus (Snellen, 1872)
- Lachnocnema divergens Gaede, 1915

=== Poritiinae ===
==== Liptenini ====
- Alaena johanna Sharpe, 1890
- Pentila pauli ras Talbot, 1935

=== Aphnaeinae ===
- Chloroselas esmeralda Butler, 1886
- Chloroselas pseudozeritis (Trimen, 1873)
- Cigaritis avriko (Karsch, 1893)
- Cigaritis somalina (Butler, 1886)
- Axiocerses harpax kadugli Talbot, 1935
- Axiocerses amanga (Westwood, 1881)
- Axiocerses maureli Dufrane, 1954
- Axiocerses argenteomaculata Pagenstecher, 1902
- Axiocerses jacksoni Stempffer, 1948

=== Theclinae ===
- Myrina silenus nzoiae d'Abrera, 1980
- Hypolycaena ogadenensis Stempffer, 1946
- Hypolycaena philippus (Fabricius, 1793)
- Leptomyrina boschi Strand, 1911
- Iolaus diametra (Karsch, 1895)
- Iolaus glaucus Butler, 1886
- Iolaus jacksoni (Stempffer, 1950)
- Iolaus mimosae berbera (Bethune-Baker, 1924)
- Iolaus tajoraca Walker, 1870
- Iolaus sudanicus Aurivillius, 1905
- Iolaus menas Druce, 1890
- Iolaus ismenias piaggiae Oberthür, 1883
- Iolaus crawshayi maureli Dufrane, 1954
- Stugeta bowkeri ethiopica Stempffer & Bennett, 1958
- Pilodeudorix obscurata (Trimen, 1891)
- Deudorix dinochares Grose-Smith, 1887
- Deudorix lorisona baronica Ungemach, 1932

=== Polyommatinae ===
==== Lycaenesthini ====
- Anthene amarah (Guérin-Méneville, 1849)
- Anthene aurobrunnea (Ungemach, 1932)
- Anthene butleri butleri (Oberthür, 1880)
- Anthene butleri galla Stempffer, 1947
- Anthene collinsi d'Abrera, 1980
- Anthene contrastata (Ungemach, 1932)
- Anthene crawshayi minuta (Bethune-Baker, 1916)
- Anthene definita nigrocaudata (Pagenstecher, 1902)
- Anthene hodsoni (Talbot, 1935)
- Anthene indefinita (Bethune-Baker, 1910)
- Anthene janna Gabriel, 1949
- Anthene kersteni (Gerstaecker, 1871)
- Anthene opalina Stempffer, 1946
- Anthene otacilia dulcis (Pagenstecher, 1902)
- Anthene pitmani Stempffer, 1936
- Anthene princeps (Butler, 1876)
- Anthene rothschildi (Aurivillius, 1922)
- Anthene saddacus (Talbot, 1935)
- Anthene schoutedeni (Hulstaert, 1924)
- Anthene suquala (Pagenstecher, 1902)
- Anthene wilsoni (Talbot, 1935)
- Anthene gemmifera (Neave, 1910)
- Lycaena phlaeas pseudophlaeas (Lucas, 1866)

==== Polyommatini ====
- Cupidopsis jobates mauritanica Riley, 1932
- Lampides boeticus (Linnaeus, 1767)
- Uranothauma antinorii (Oberthür, 1883)
- Uranothauma delatorum Heron, 1909
- Uranothauma nubifer distinctesignatus (Strand, 1911)
- Cacyreus ethiopicus Tite, 1961
- Cacyreus tespis ghimirra Talbot, 1935
- Tuxentius cretosus (Butler, 1876)
- Tuxentius kaffana (Talbot, 1935)
- Tuxentius melaena (Trimen & Bowker, 1887)
- Tarucus grammicus (Grose-Smith & Kirby, 1893)
- Tarucus rosacea (Austaut, 1885)
- Tarucus theophrastus (Fabricius, 1793)
- Tarucus ungemachi Stempffer, 1942
- Zintha hintza resplendens (Butler, 1876)
- Actizera stellata (Trimen, 1883)
- Azanus jesous (Guérin-Méneville, 1849)
- Azanus natalensis (Trimen & Bowker, 1887)
- Azanus isis (Drury, 1773)
- Eicochrysops antoto (Strand, 1911)
- Eicochrysops distractus (de Joannis & Verity, 1913)
- Eicochrysops masai (Bethune-Baker, 1905)
- Eicochrysops meryamae Rougeot, 1983
- Eicochrysops messapus sebagadis (Guérin-Méneville, 1849)
- Euchrysops abyssinica (Aurivillius, 1922)
- Euchrysops albistriata (Capronnier, 1889)
- Euchrysops brunneus Bethune-Baker, 1923
- Euchrysops cyclopteris (Butler, 1876)
- Euchrysops mauensis abyssiniae Storace, 1950
- Euchrysops nandensis (Neave, 1904)
- Euchrysops nilotica (Aurivillius, 1904)
- Euchrysops reducta Hulstaert, 1924
- Euchrysops severini Hulstaert, 1924
- Thermoniphas colorata (Ungemach, 1932)
- Chilades elicola (Strand, 1911)
- Chilades naidina (Butler, 1886)
- Lepidochrysops lunulifer (Ungemach, 1932)
- Lepidochrysops fumosa (Butler, 1886)
- Lepidochrysops guichardi Gabriel, 1949
- Lepidochrysops loveni abyssiniensis (Strand, 1911)
- Lepidochrysops loveni oculus (Ungemach, 1932)
- Lepidochrysops negus (Felder & Felder, [1865])
- Lepidochrysops pterou lilacina (Ungemach, 1932)
- Lepidochrysops subvariegata Talbot, 1935

== Nymphalidae ==
=== Libytheinae ===
- Libythea labdaca laius Trimen, 1879

=== Danainae ===
==== Danaini ====
- Danaus chrysippus chrysippus (Linnaeus, 1758)
- Danaus chrysippus alcippus (Cramer, 1777)
- Danaus dorippus (Klug, 1845)
- Tirumala formosa neumanni (Rothschild, 1902)
- Tirumala petiverana (Doubleday, 1847)
- Amauris niavius aethiops Rothschild & Jordan, 1903
- Amauris albimaculata sudanica Talbot, 1940
- Amauris echeria abessinica Schmidt, 1921
- Amauris echeria steckeri Kheil, 1890
- Amauris hecate stictica Rothschild & Jordan, 1903
- Amauris ochlea darius Rothschild & Jordan, 1903
- Amauris ochleides Staudinger, 1896

=== Satyrinae ===
==== Melanitini ====
- Gnophodes betsimena parmeno Doubleday, 1849
- Melanitis libya Distant, 1882

==== Satyrini ====
- Lasiommata maderakal (Guérin-Méneville, 1849)
- Bicyclus angulosa (Butler, 1868)
- Bicyclus anynana (Butler, 1879)
- Bicyclus campus (Karsch, 1893)
- Bicyclus milyas (Hewitson, 1864)
- Bicyclus pavonis (Butler, 1876)
- Bicyclus safitza safitza (Westwood, 1850)
- Bicyclus safitza aethiops (Rothschild & Jordan, 1905)
- Bicyclus sandace (Hewitson, 1877)
- Bicyclus vulgaris (Butler, 1868)
- Heteropsis perspicua (Trimen, 1873)
- Ypthima asterope (Klug, 1832)
- Ypthima condamini Kielland, 1982
- Ypthima impura paupera Ungemach, 1932
- Ypthima jacksoni Kielland, 1982
- Ypthima pupillaris obscurata Kielland, 1982
- Ypthima simplicia Butler, 1876
- Ypthima yatta Kielland, 1982
- Ypthimomorpha itonia (Hewitson, 1865)
- Neocoenyra duplex Butler, 1886

=== Charaxinae ===
==== Charaxini ====
- Charaxes varanes vologeses (Mabille, 1876)
- Charaxes candiope (Godart, 1824)
- Charaxes boueti rectans Rothschild & Jordan, 1903
- Charaxes lactetinctus ungemachi Le Cerf, 1927
- Charaxes jasius Poulton, 1926
- Charaxes epijasius Reiche, 1850
- Charaxes jasius pagenstecheri Poulton, 1926
- Charaxes hansali hansali Felder, 1867
- Charaxes hansali baringana Rothschild, 1905
- Charaxes hansali kulalae van Someren, 1975
- Charaxes castor (Cramer, 1775)
- Charaxes junius junius Oberthür, 1880
- Charaxes julius somalicus Rothschild, 1900
- Charaxes phoebus Butler, 1866
- Charaxes numenes neumanni Rothschild, 1902
- Charaxes tiridates marginatus Rothschild & Jordan, 1903
- Charaxes pythodoris Hewitson, 1873
- Charaxes etesipe abyssinicus Rothschild, 1900
- Charaxes achaemenes monticola van Someren, 1970
- Charaxes jahlusa ganalensis Carpenter, 1937
- Charaxes etheocles carpenteri van Someren & Jackson, 1957
- Charaxes galawadiwosi Plantrou & Rougeot, 1979
- Charaxes chanleri Holland, 1896
- Charaxes kirki daria Rothschild, 1903
- Charaxes figini van Someren, 1969
- Charaxes larseni Rydon, 1982
- Charaxes sidamo Plantrou & Rougeot, 1979
- Charaxes zoolina (Westwood, [1850])

==== Euxanthini ====
- Charaxes eurinome birbirica Ungemach, 1932

=== Nymphalinae ===
==== Nymphalini ====
- Antanartia schaeneia diluta Rothschild & Jordan, 1903
- Vanessa dimorphica dimorphica (Howarth, 1966)
- Vanessa dimorphica aethiopica (Howarth, 1966)
- Vanessa abyssinica (Felder & Felder, 1867)
- Junonia chorimene (Guérin-Méneville, 1844)
- Junonia oenone (Linnaeus, 1758)
- Junonia sophia infracta Butler, 1888
- Junonia terea fumata (Rothschild & Jordan, 1903)
- Junonia westermanni Westwood, 1870
- Junonia ansorgei (Rothschild, 1899)
- Salamis cacta (Fabricius, 1793)
- Protogoniomorpha anacardii nebulosa (Trimen, 1881)
- Protogoniomorpha parhassus (Drury, 1782)
- Protogoniomorpha temora (Felder & Felder, 1867)
- Precis ceryne (Boisduval, 1847)
- Precis coelestina Dewitz, 1879
- Precis limnoria limnoria (Klug, 1845)
- Precis limnoria taveta Rogenhofer, 1891
- Precis octavia (Cramer, 1777)
- Precis pelarga (Fabricius, 1775)
- Precis tugela aurorina (Butler, 1894)
- Hypolimnas anthedon wahlbergi (Wallengren, 1857)
- Hypolimnas misippus (Linnaeus, 1764)
- Hypolimnas salmacis platydema Rothschild & Jordan, 1903
- Melitaea abyssinica Oberthür, 1909

=== Cyrestinae ===
==== Cyrestini ====
- Cyrestis camillus (Fabricius, 1781)

=== Biblidinae ===
==== Biblidini ====
- Byblia anvatara acheloia (Wallengren, 1857)
- Byblia ilithyia (Drury, 1773)
- Neptidopsis ophione nucleata Grünberg, 1911
- Eurytela dryope angulata Aurivillius, 1899
- Eurytela hiarbas abyssinica Rothschild & Jordan, 1903

==== Epicaliini ====
- Sevenia boisduvali kaffana (Rothschild & Jordan, 1903)
- Sevenia garega (Karsch, 1892)
- Sevenia occidentalium (Mabille, 1876)
- Sevenia umbrina (Karsch, 1892)

=== Limenitinae ===
==== Limenitidini ====
- Pseudacraea boisduvalii sayonis Ungemach, 1932
- Pseudacraea eurytus mimoras Ungemach, 1932
- Pseudacraea lucretia walensensis (Sharpe, 1896)

==== Neptidini ====
- Neptis agouale parallela Collins & Larsen, 1996
- Neptis laeta Overlaet, 1955
- Neptis saclava marpessa Hopffer, 1855
- Neptis serena Overlaet, 1955

==== Adoliadini ====
- Aterica galene incisa Rothschild & Jordan, 1903
- Euphaedra medon abouna Ungemach, 1932
- Euphaedra caerulescens submarginalis Hecq, 1997
- Euphaedra sarita abyssinica Rothschild, 1902
- Euphaedra neumanni Rothschild, 1902
- Euphaedra castanoides deficiens Hecq, 1997

=== Heliconiinae ===
==== Acraeini ====
- Acraea chilo Godman, 1880
- Acraea endoscota Le Doux, 1928
- Acraea insignis Distant, 1880
- Acraea neobule Doubleday, 1847
- Acraea oscari Rothschild, 1902
- Acraea pseudolycia astrigera Butler, 1899
- Acraea quirina rosa Eltringham, 1912
- Acraea sidamona Rothschild & Jordan, 1905
- Acraea egina (Cramer, 1775)
- Acraea braesia Godman, 1885
- Acraea caecilia (Fabricius, 1781)
- Acraea caldarena Hewitson, 1877
- Acraea doubledayi Guérin-Méneville, 1849
- Acraea mirabilis Butler, 1886
- Acraea miranda Riley, 1920
- Acraea oncaea Hopffer, 1855
- Acraea pseudegina Westwood, 1852
- Acraea zoumi Pierre, 1995
- Acraea aganice orientalis (Ungemach, 1932)
- Acraea alcinoe nado (Ungemach, 1932)
- Acraea epaea homochroa (Rothschild & Jordan, 1905)
- Acraea poggei ras (Ungemach, 1932)
- Acraea aurivillii schecana Rothschild & Jordan, 1905
- Acraea bonasia banka Eltringham, 1912
- Acraea encedana Pierre, 1976
- Acraea serena (Fabricius, 1775)
- Acraea iturina kakana Eltringham, 1911
- Acraea jodutta aethiops Rothschild & Jordan, 1905
- Acraea johnstoni Godman, 1885
- Acraea lycoa Godart, 1819
- Acraea necoda Hewitson, 1861
- Acraea peneleos gelonica Rothschild & Jordan, 1905
- Acraea pharsalus rhodina Rothschild, 1902
- Acraea rangatana maji Carpenter, 1935
- Acraea sotikensis Sharpe, 1892
- Acraea ventura ochrascens Sharpe, 1902
- Acraea guichardi Gabriel, 1949
- Acraea cinerea Neave, 1904
- Acraea orinata Oberthür, 1893
- Acraea parrhasia servona Godart, 1819
- Acraea perenna kaffana Rothschild, 1902
- Acraea safie safie Felder & Felder, 1865
- Acraea safie antinorii Oberthür, 1880
- Acraea ungemachi Le Cerf, 1927

==== Argynnini ====
- Argynnis hyperbius neumanni Rothschild, 1902

==== Vagrantini ====
- Phalanta eurytis eurytis (Doubleday, 1847)
- Phalanta eurytis microps (Rothschild & Jordan, 1903)
- Phalanta phalantha aethiopica (Rothschild & Jordan, 1903)

== Hesperiidae ==
=== Coeliadinae ===
- Coeliades anchises (Gerstaecker, 1871)
- Coeliades chalybe immaculata Carpenter, 1935
- Coeliades forestan (Stoll, [1782])
- Coeliades keithloa menelik (Ungemach, 1932)
- Coeliades pisistratus (Fabricius, 1793)

=== Pyrginae ===
==== Celaenorrhinini ====
- Eretis lugens (Rogenhofer, 1891)
- Eretis mixta Evans, 1937
- Sarangesa laelius (Mabille, 1877)
- Sarangesa lucidella helena Evans, 1947
- Sarangesa motozi (Wallengren, 1857)
- Sarangesa phidyle (Walker, 1870)

==== Tagiadini ====
- Eagris denuba obliterata Carpenter, 1928
- Eagris nottoana (Wallengren, 1857)
- Caprona adelica Karsch, 1892
- Caprona pillaana Wallengren, 1857
- Leucochitonea hindei Druce, 1903
- Abantis meneliki Berger, 1979

==== Carcharodini ====
- Spialia colotes semiconfluens de Jong, 1978
- Spialia mafa higginsi Evans, 1937
- Spialia mangana (Rebel, 1899)
- Spialia zebra bifida (Higgins, 1924)

=== Hesperiinae ===
==== Aeromachini ====
- Prosopalpus debilis (Plötz, 1879)
- Kedestes callicles (Hewitson, 1868)
- Acleros mackenii instabilis Mabille, 1890
- Chondrolepis niveicornis pseudonero Berger, 1984
- Zophopetes dysmephila (Trimen, 1868)
- Artitropa reducta Aurivillius, 1925

==== Baorini ====
- Zenonia zeno (Trimen, 1864)
- Borbo perobscura (Druce, 1912)
- Gegenes hottentota (Latreille, 1824)

=== Heteropterinae ===
- Metisella formosus mittoni Carcasson, 1961
- Metisella tsadicus (Aurivillius, 1905)

== See also ==
- List of ecoregions in Ethiopia
- Geography of Ethiopia
