= Crimson tip =

Crimson tip may refer to

- Colotis danae, a butterfly endemic to Africa, the Arabian Peninsula, and India
- Colotis hetaera, a butterfly endemic to Kenya and Tanzania
