= Anthene wilsoni =

Scientific classification
- Domain: Eukaryota
- Kingdom: Animalia
- Phylum: Arthropoda
- Class: Insecta
- Order: Lepidoptera
- Family: Lycaenidae
- Genus: Anthene
- Species: A. wilsoni

Binomial name
- Anthene wilsoni (Talbot, 1935)

Synonyms
- Lycaenesthes (Cupidesthes) wilsoni Talbot, 1935; Anthene (Anthene) wilsoni

Species of butterfly

Anthene wilsoni, the Wilson's hairtail or Wilson's ciliate blue, is a butterfly in the family Lycaenidae. It is found in Ghana (the Volta Region), northern Cameroon, southern Sudan, south-western Ethiopia, north-eastern Uganda, western Kenya, western Tanzania, Zambia and north-eastern Zimbabwe. The habitat consists of wet parkland savanna and dry savanna.

Adults are on wing from late November to mid-February.

The larvae feed on Entada abyssinica and Acacia abyssinica.
