= Mylothris mortoni =

Scientific classification
- Kingdom: Animalia
- Phylum: Arthropoda
- Clade: Pancrustacea
- Class: Insecta
- Order: Lepidoptera
- Family: Pieridae
- Genus: Mylothris
- Species: M. mortoni

Binomial name
- Mylothris mortoni Blachier, 1912

Species of butterfly

Mylothris mortoni is a butterfly in the family Pieridae. It is found in Ethiopia.

== Subspecies ==
- Mylothris mortoni mortoni (northern and eastern Ethiopia)
- Mylothris mortoni balkis Ungemach, 1932 (western Ethiopia)
