= Leucochitonea hindei =

Scientific classification
- Kingdom: Animalia
- Phylum: Arthropoda
- Class: Insecta
- Order: Lepidoptera
- Family: Hesperiidae
- Genus: Abantis
- Species: A. hindei

Binomial name
- Abantis hindei Druce, 1903

Species of butterfly

Leucochitonea hindei is a butterfly in the family Hesperiidae. It is found in Ethiopia and Kenya.
