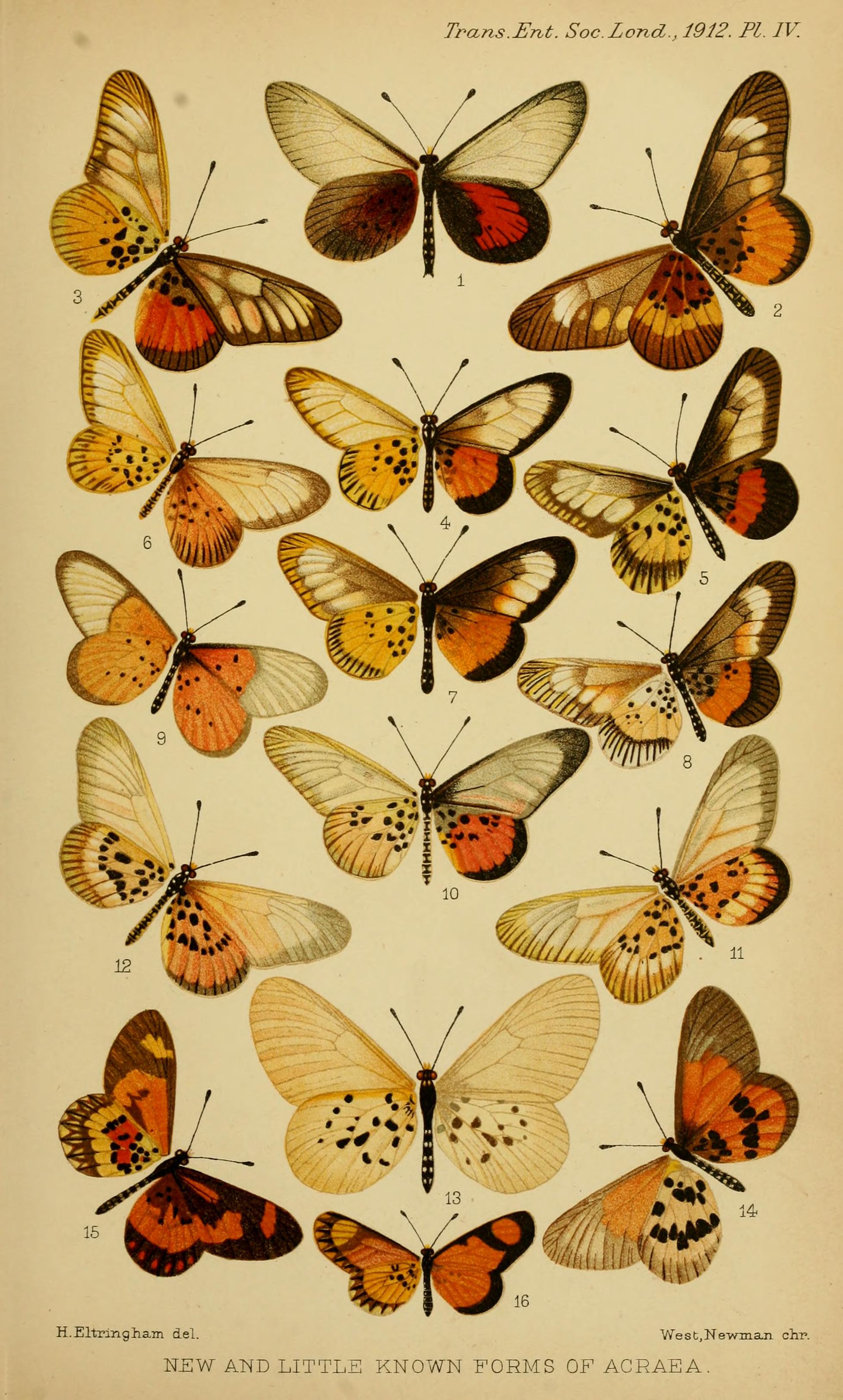
- A. i. kakana figure 14

Scientific classification
- Kingdom: Animalia
- Phylum: Arthropoda
- Class: Insecta
- Order: Lepidoptera
- Family: Nymphalidae
- Genus: Acraea
- Species: A. iturina

Binomial name
- Acraea iturina Grose-Smith, 1890

Synonyms
- Acraea (Actinote) iturina; Acraea iturinoides Stoneham, 1936; Acraea iturina f. sinepeduncles Stoneham, 1936; Acraea iturina f. albicolor Stoneham, 1943; Acraea kakana ab. infernalis Ungemach, 1932

= Acraea iturina =

Ituri glassy acraea

Species of butterfly

Acraea iturina, the Ituri glassy acraea, is a butterfly in the family Nymphalidae. It is found in Nigeria, from Cameroon to the Democratic Republic of the Congo and in Uganda, Tanzania and Ethiopia.

== Description ==
A. iturina Smith. Forewing hyaline, darkened at the costal and distal margins, red to red-yellow at the base as far as vein 3; this colour does not reach the apex of the cell and encloses a dark spot in the cell and occasionally also a discal dot in 2. Hindwing red-yellow with grey marginal band 2 to 3 mm. in breadth and free basal and discal dots, arranged almost as in kakana. Cameroons, Congo and Uganda.

A. kakana Eltr. (60 e) is unknown to me, but is given by Eltringham first as a variety (race) of iturina and then as a probably independent species. From the figure and description the latter view seems to me [Aurivillius] to be the correct one. Fore wing narrowly black at the base and the costal margin, semitransparent blackish in the apical half; the rest of the wing as far as the apex of the cell orange-red without dots or spots. Hindwing above orange-red with blackish marginal band about 2 mm. in breadth, towards the anal angle gradually narrowing to a point, almost confluent basal dots and large discal dots, broadly separated from the basal and united into a nearly straight median transverse band, the dots in cellules 2 to 4 triangular and occupying the entire base of their cellules; the spot in 3 is thus placed much nearer to the distal margin than the others, which almost touch one another at the apex of the cell. Under surface like the upper, but much paler, particularly on the hindwing. Abyssinia.

== Subspecies ==
- Acraea iturina iturina (Nigeria, Cameroon, to Democratic Republic of the Congo, Uganda, north-western Tanzania)
- Acraea iturina kakana Eltringham, 1911 (south-western Ethiopia)

== Biology ==
The habitat consists of forests at altitudes between 900 and 2,000 meters.

The larvae feed on Urera cordifolia.

== Taxonomy ==
See Pierre & Bernaud, 2014
