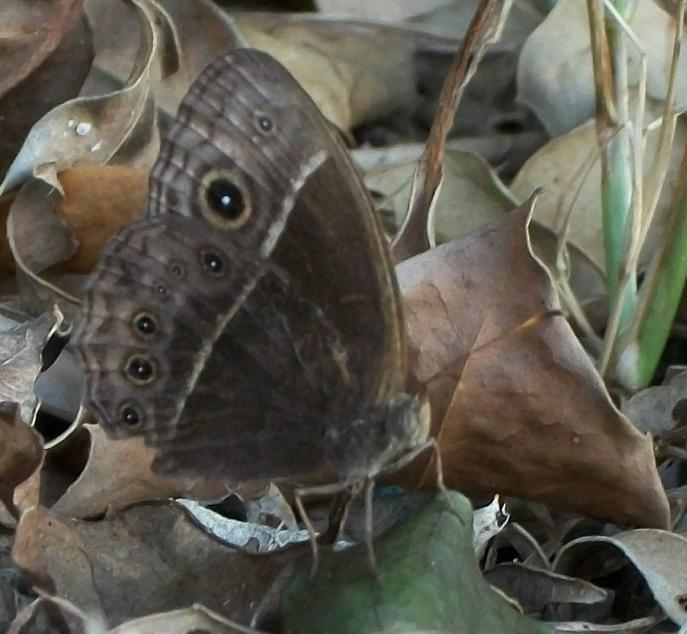
- Wet-season form, f. injusta

Scientific classification
- Kingdom: Animalia
- Phylum: Arthropoda
- Clade: Pancrustacea
- Class: Insecta
- Order: Lepidoptera
- Family: Nymphalidae
- Genus: Bicyclus
- Species: B. safitza

Binomial name
- Bicyclus safitza (Westwood, [1850])

Synonyms
- Mycalesis safitza Westwood, [1850]; Papilio delila Fabricius, 1793; Mycalesis eusirus Hopffer, 1855; Mycalesis evenus Hopffer, 1855; Mycalesis injusta Wallengren, 1857; Mycalesis caffra Wallengren, 1857; Mycalesis safitza ab. semicoeca Strand, 1910; Mycalesis aethiops f. velutina Ungemach, 1932

= Bicyclus safitza =

Species of butterfly

Bicyclus safitza, the common bush brown or common savanna bush brown, is a butterfly of the family Nymphalidae. It is found in all of Africa south of the Sahara. Its preferred habitat is forests and other well-wooded habitats.

The wingspan is 40–45 mm for males and 43–48 mm for females. Adults are on wing year round.

The larvae feed on various grasses, including Ehrharta erecta.

== Subspecies and forms ==
- B. s. safitza – south of Sahara except Ethiopia

wet-season form, f. safitza – south to Mpumalanga, South Africa
wet-season form, f. injusta – South African east coast regions
dry-season form, f. evenus – widespread

- B. s. aethiops (Rothschild & Jordan, 1905) – Ethiopia

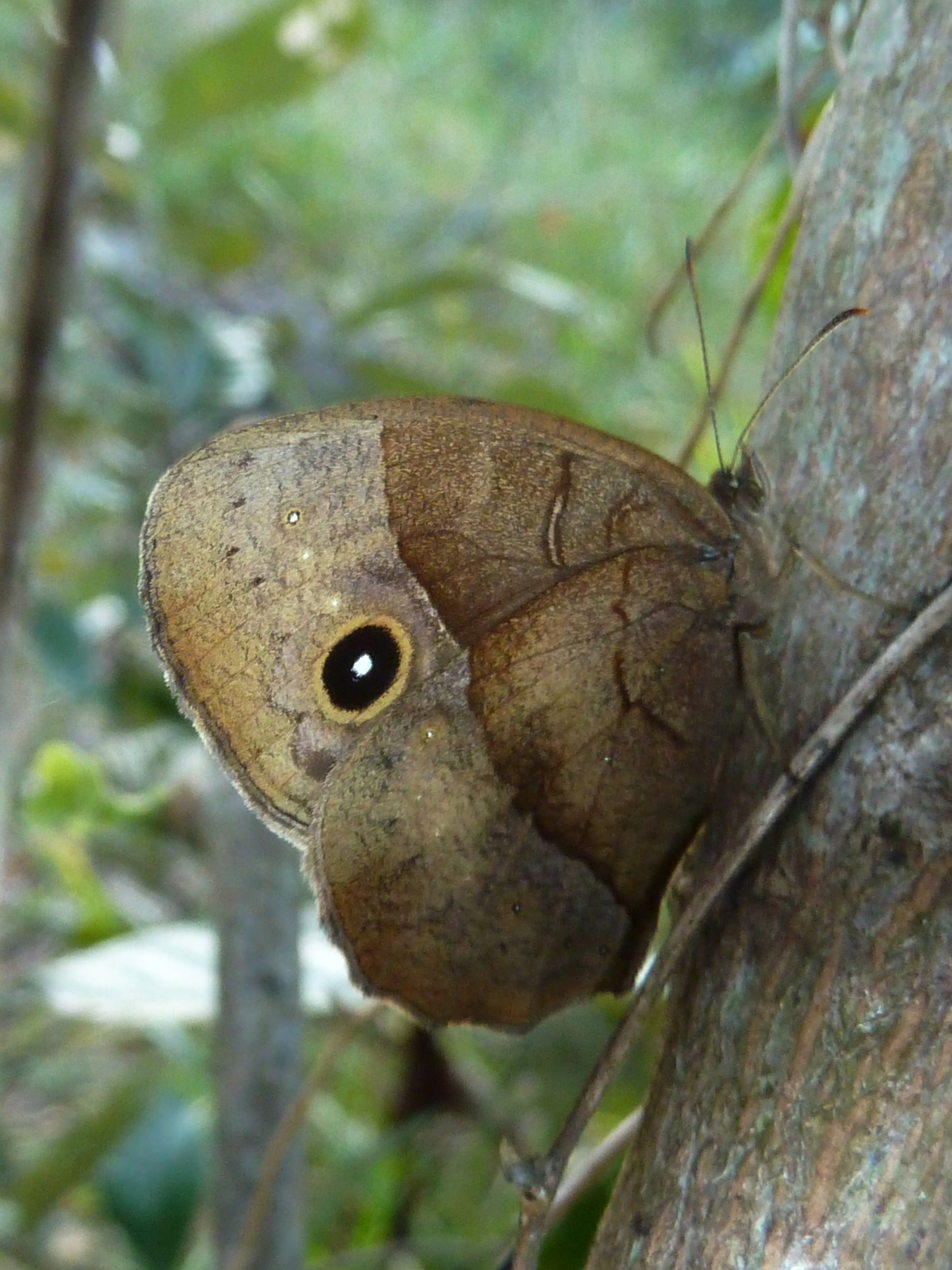
Dry-season form, f. evenus, lacking clear ocelli on the hindwing
