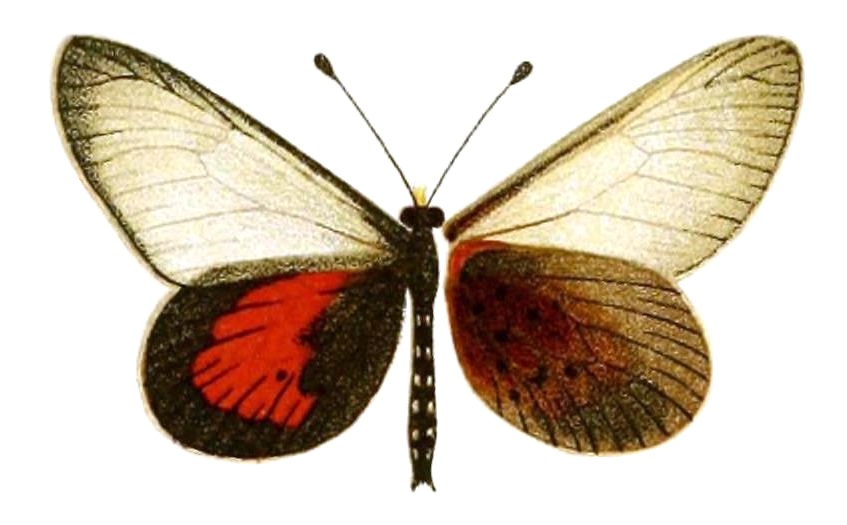
- Imago of A. c. alberta, illustrated in Eltringham (1912)

Scientific classification
- Kingdom: Animalia
- Phylum: Arthropoda
- Class: Insecta
- Order: Lepidoptera
- Family: Nymphalidae
- Genus: Acraea
- Species: A. cinerea

Binomial name
- Acraea cinerea Neave, 1904

Synonyms
- Acraea (Actinote) cinerea; Acraea cinerea alberta Eltringham, 1911

= Acraea cinerea =

Grey acraea

Species of butterfly

Acraea cinerea, the grey acraea, is a butterfly in the family Nymphalidae which is native to East Africa.

== Range ==
It is found in the Democratic Republic of the Congo, Uganda, Rwanda, Ethiopia, Kenya, Tanzania and Zambia.

== Description ==
A. cinerea Neave. Fore wing diaphanous without a trace of definite spots, at the costal margin and at the apex more or less dusted with grey. Hindwing above uniform black, beneath at the base with a large dark red area, which extends to the apex of the cell and the inner margin; basal dots feebly developed; fore wing beneath dark red at the base of the costal margin. British East Africa: Tiriki Hills (5000 ft.).

- alberta Eltr. (60 e) differs in the hindwing having above a large, elongate carmine-red spot, which covers the base of cellules 7-2, the middle of cellule 1c and the apex of the cell. To the west of Lake Albert & Edward.

== Subspecies ==
- Acraea cinerea cinerea — Democratic Republic of the Congo: east to northern Kivu, Ethiopia, Uganda, Rwanda, Kenya, western Tanzania, Zambia
- Acraea cinerea luluae Berger, 1981 — Democratic Republic of the Congo: south to Lualaba

== Taxonomy ==
It is a member of the Acraea masamba species group – but see also Pierre & Bernaud, 2014
