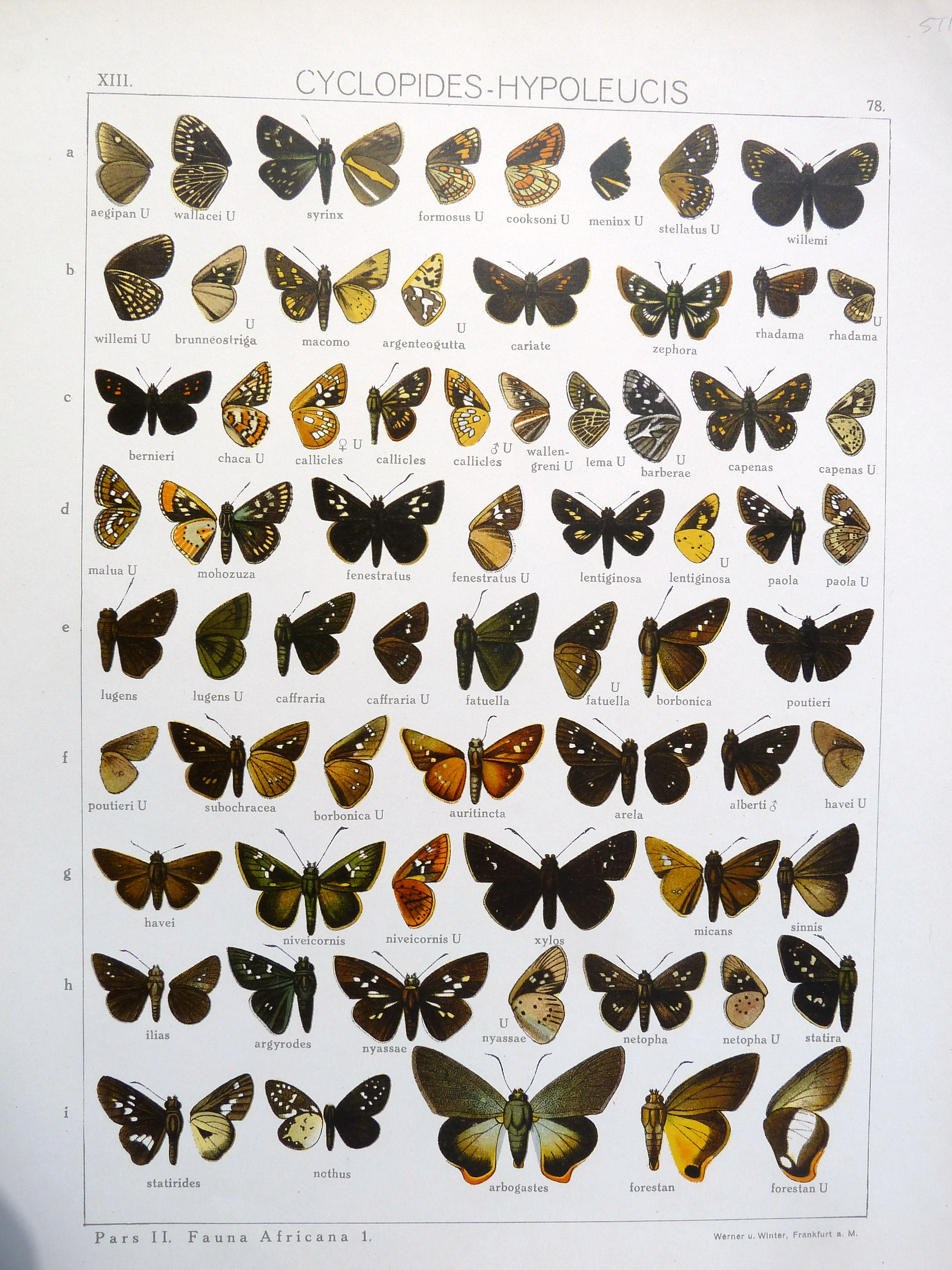

Scientific classification
- Kingdom: Animalia
- Phylum: Arthropoda
- Class: Insecta
- Order: Lepidoptera
- Family: Hesperiidae
- Genus: Willema
- Species: W. formosa

Binomial name
- Willema formosa (Butler, 1894)

Synonyms
- Heteropterus formosus Butler, 1894; Metisella formosus (Butler, 1894)

= Willema formosa =

Species of butterfly

Willema formosa, the beautiful sylph, is a species of butterfly in the family Hesperiidae. It is found in Malawi, Zambia, the Democratic Republic of the Congo, Tanzania, Kenya, Ethiopia, Uganda and Tanzania. The habitat consists of forest edges.

== Subspecies ==
- Willema formosa formosus (Malawi)
- Willema formosa linda Evans, 1937 - northern Zambia, Democratic Republic of the Congo: Shaba, western Tanzania, western Kenya
- Willema formosa mittoni Carcasson, 1961 - southern Ethiopia
- Willema formosa nyanza Evans, 1937 - Uganda, Democratic Republic of the Congo: east to Kivu, north-western Tanzania
