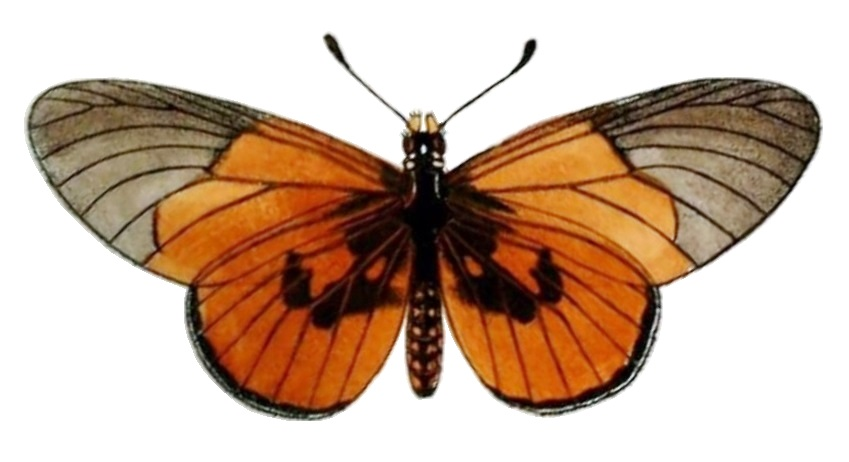
- male

Scientific classification
- Kingdom: Animalia
- Phylum: Arthropoda
- Class: Insecta
- Order: Lepidoptera
- Family: Nymphalidae
- Genus: Acraea
- Species: A. insignis

Binomial name
- Acraea insignis Distant, 1880

Synonyms
- Acraea (Acraea) insignis; Acraea buxtoni Hewitson, 1877; Acraea balbina Oberthür, 1888; Acraea insignis siginna Suffert, 1904

= Acraea insignis =

Black-blotched acraea

Species of butterfly

Acraea insignis, the black-blotched acraea, is a butterfly in the family Nymphalidae. It is found in Ethiopia, the Democratic Republic of the Congo, Sudan, Uganda, Kenya, Tanzania, Malawi, Zambia, Mozambique and Zimbabwe.

== Description ==
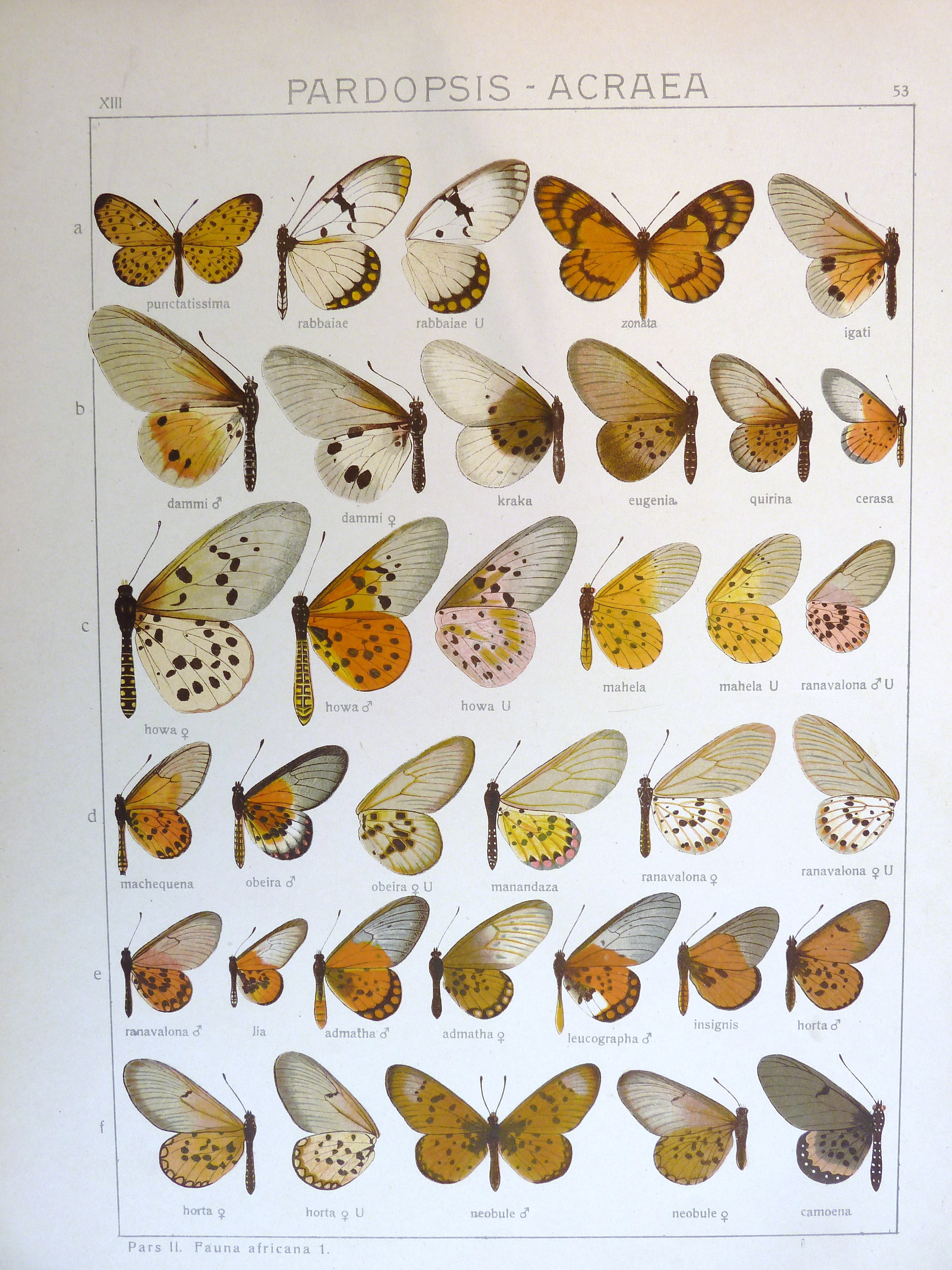
Seitz Fauna Africana Taf 53

A. insignis Dist. (53 e). Forewing above scaled with red-yellow to the apex of the cell and the hinder angle, in the apical part transparent black-grey, at the end of the cell with a black transverse streak, otherwise without markings. Hindwing red-yellow with narrow black, unspotted marginal band about 1 mm. in breadth, which beneath is often grey at the distal margin, at the base with large confluent black spots and with large discal dots in 1 b to 2, of which the one in 2 covers the base of the cellule, and with a thick black transverse streak at the end of the cell; the discal dots in cellules 3-7 are entirely absent; beneath as above, but much lighter reddish white with a red band at the proximal side of the black marginal band. In the female the ground-colour is often grey-yellowish. Nyassaland; German and British East Africa; Uganda, f. siginna Suff. (54 a) is characterized by having the black spots in the basal part of the hindwing united into a large, deep black patch, which also covers the base of celhdes 3 to 6. German and British East Africa, especially in the high-lying localities.

== Subspecies ==
- Acraea insignis insignis — Ethiopia, Democratic Republic of the Congo, southern Sudan, Uganda, Kenya, Tanzania, Zambia, Malawi
- Acraea insignis gorongozae van Son, 1963 — western Mozambique, eastern Zimbabwe

== Biology ==
The habitat consists of forests.

Both sexes are attracted to flowers. Adults are probably on wing year round.

The larvae feed on Vitis, Gossypium, Adenia and Kiggelaria species.

== Taxonomy ==
It is a member of the Acraea terpsicore species group - but see also Pierre & Bernaud, 2014
