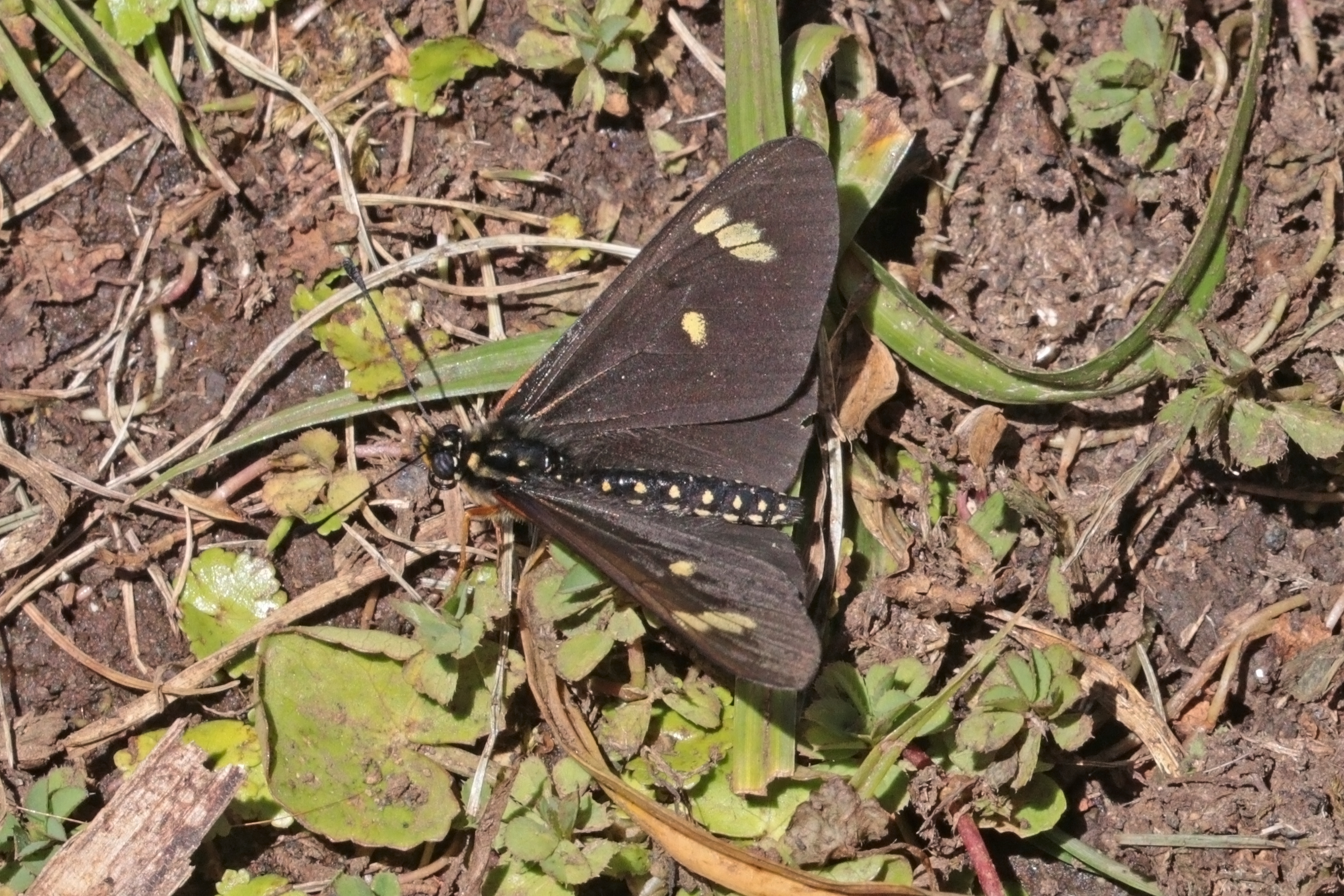
- Bale Mountains, Ethiopia

Scientific classification
- Kingdom: Animalia
- Phylum: Arthropoda
- Class: Insecta
- Order: Lepidoptera
- Family: Nymphalidae
- Genus: Acraea
- Species: A. safie

Binomial name
- Acraea safie Felder & Felder, 1865

Synonyms
- Acraea (Actinote) safie; Acraea safie f. tillini Gabriel, 1949; Acraea antinorii Oberthür, 1880; Acraea safie f. neumanni Le Doux, 1928; Acraea safie antinorii ab. albipuncta Ungemach, 1932; Acraea safie antinorii ab. oumbiana Ungemach, 1932

= Acraea safie =

Species of butterfly

Acraea safie is a butterfly in the family Nymphalidae. It is found in Ethiopia.

== Description ==
A. safie Fldr. (57 b) is a small, very distinct species. Both wings densely scaled, black-brown above; the forewing with three white subapical spots in 4-6 and a yellow spot in 1 b and in 2, the hindwing with a narrow yellow median band, more or less broken up into spots; on the under surface the fore wing is black with sulphur-yellow marginal band striped with black and light discal spots as above; the ground-colour of the hindwing beneath is a lighter or darker yellowish, with or without indication of a median band; black basal dots reduced; marginal streaks fine, occasionally at the proximal end with punctiform thickening. Abyssinia.- f. antinorii Oberth. only differs in having the median band on the upperside of the hindwing absent or incomplete. Abyssinia.

== Subspecies ==
- Acraea safie safie (northern and central Ethiopia)
- Acraea safie antinorii Oberthür, 1880 (western and southern Ethiopia)

== Taxonomy ==
It is a member of the Acraea jodutta species group - but see also Pierre & Bernaud, 2014
