= Charaxes figini =

Scientific classification
- Kingdom: Animalia
- Phylum: Arthropoda
- Class: Insecta
- Order: Lepidoptera
- Family: Nymphalidae
- Genus: Charaxes
- Species: C. figini

Binomial name
- Charaxes figini van Someren, 1969

Synonyms
- Charaxes viola figini van Someren, 1969; Charaxes etheocles f. figini Storace, 1948; Charaxes figinii

Species of butterfly

Charaxes figini is a butterfly in the family Nymphalidae. It is found in Ethiopia (western Eritrea). The habitat consists of thornveld savanna. The holotype is in Museo Civico di Storia Naturale di Genova.
