= Lepidochrysops loveni =

Scientific classification
- Kingdom: Animalia
- Phylum: Arthropoda
- Class: Insecta
- Order: Lepidoptera
- Family: Lycaenidae
- Genus: Lepidochrysops
- Species: L. loveni

Binomial name
- Lepidochrysops loveni (Aurivillius, 1922)

Synonyms
- Cupido loveni Aurivillius, 1922; Neochrysops parsimon ab. albicans Hulstaert, 1924; Cupido celaeus var. abyssiniensis Strand, 1911; Catochrysops celaeus kivuensis Joicey & Talbot, 1921; Euchrysops parsimon oculus Ungemach, 1932

Species of butterfly

Lepidochrysops loveni is a butterfly in the family Lycaenidae. It is found in Ethiopia, Uganda, Kenya, Tanzania, the Democratic Republic of the Congo, Rwanda, Zambia and possibly Malawi and Angola. The habitat consists of open Brachystegia woodland at altitudes between 1,200 and 1,500 metres, as well as grass-topped low hill ranges.

Adults are on wing from October to December.

The larvae feed on Ocimum and Salvia species.

== Subspecies ==
- L. l. loveni (Uganda, western and central Kenya, Democratic Republic of the Congo: Lualaba, north-western Tanzania, Zambia, possibly Malawi and Angola)
- L. l. abyssiniensis (Strand, 1911) (Ethiopia)
- L. l. kivuensis (Joicey & Talbot, 1921) (Democratic Republic of the Congo: northern Rift Valley to Kivu and the plains east of Lake Kivu and Lake Edward, Rwanda)
- L. l. oculus (Ungemach, 1932) (Ethiopia)
