= Stugeta somalina =

Scientific classification
- Kingdom: Animalia
- Phylum: Arthropoda
- Class: Insecta
- Order: Lepidoptera
- Family: Lycaenidae
- Genus: Stugeta
- Species: S. somalina

Binomial name
- Stugeta somalina Stempffer, 1946

Species of butterfly

Stugeta somalina is a butterfly in the family Lycaenidae. It was described by Henri Stempffer in 1946. It is found in Somalia and northern Kenya.
