= Acraea miranda =

Scientific classification
- Kingdom: Animalia
- Phylum: Arthropoda
- Class: Insecta
- Order: Lepidoptera
- Family: Nymphalidae
- Genus: Acraea
- Species: A. miranda

Binomial name
- Acraea miranda Riley, 1920

Synonyms
- Acraea (Acraea) miranda; Acraea miranda f. selousi Riley, 1920

Species of butterfly

Acraea miranda, the Somali acraea or desert acraea, is a butterfly in the family Nymphalidae. It is found in Somalia, south-eastern Ethiopia and eastern and northern Kenya.

== Taxonomy ==
Acraea miranda, sister-species of A. mirabilis, is a member of the Acraea natalica species group; see Acraea. See also Pierre & Bernaud, 2014
