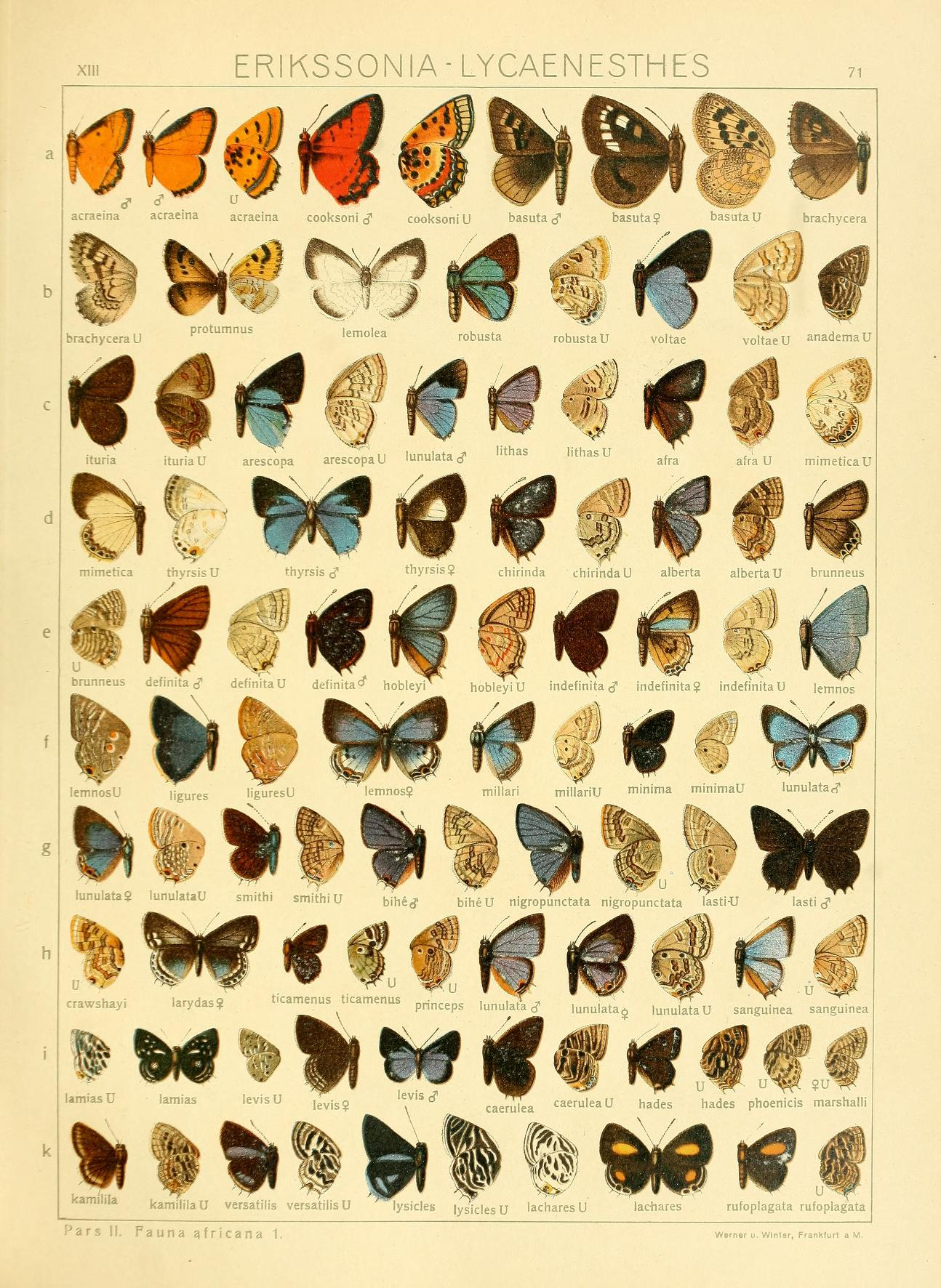

Scientific classification
- Kingdom: Animalia
- Phylum: Arthropoda
- Clade: Pancrustacea
- Class: Insecta
- Order: Lepidoptera
- Family: Lycaenidae
- Genus: Anthene
- Species: A. crawshayi

Binomial name
- Anthene crawshayi (Butler, 1899)

Synonyms
- Lycaenesthes crawshayi Butler, 1899; Anthene (Anthene) crawshayi; Lycaenesthes crawshayi ab. parallela Aurivillius, 1923; Lycaenesthes crawshayi marginata Hulstaert, 1924; Lycaenesthes crawshayi var. minuta Bethune-Baker, 1916; Lycaenesthes crawshayi f. albilunata Ungemach, 1932; Lycaenesthes sobrina Talbot, 1935

= Anthene crawshayi =

Species of butterfly

Anthene crawshayi, Crawshay's hairtail or Crawshay's ciliate blue, is a butterfly in the family Lycaenidae. It is found in Senegal, the Gambia, Guinea-Bissau, Burkina Faso, Guinea, Sierra Leone, Ivory Coast, Ghana, Togo, Nigeria, Cameroon, Sudan, Uganda, Ethiopia, Somalia, Kenya, Tanzania, the Democratic Republic of the Congo, Malawi, Zambia, Zimbabwe and South Africa. The habitat consists of savanna and open forests.

Adult males mud-puddle and both sexes are attracted to the flowers of Acacia trees. Adults are on wing year round.

The larvae feed on the young terminal shoots of Acacia abyssinica, Acacia polycantha campylacantha, Cassia alata and Entada abyssinica.

== Subspecies ==
- Anthene crawshayi crawshayi (Cameroon, Uganda, western Kenya, Tanzania, Malawi, Zambia, north-eastern Zimbabwe, South Africa: Limpopo Province, Democratic Republic of the Congo: Uele, Ituri, Kinshasa, Sankuru, Lualaba, Lomani, Shaba, Maniema and Kivu)
- Anthene crawshayi vuattouxi (Libert, 2010) (Senegal to northern Cameroon)
- Anthene crawshayi minuta (Bethune-Baker, 1916) (Sudan, Ethiopia, northern Uganda, Somalia, east and northern Kenya)

Torben Larsen developed a species numbering system for his 2005 publication Butterflies of West Africa. This species was listed without subspecies as #524. The 'Larsen' numbers have since been used with permission in A Sharp Eye on Butterflies of Ghana.
