= Neocoenyra rufilineata =

Scientific classification
- Domain: Eukaryota
- Kingdom: Animalia
- Phylum: Arthropoda
- Class: Insecta
- Order: Lepidoptera
- Family: Nymphalidae
- Genus: Neocoenyra
- Species: N. rufilineata

Binomial name
- Neocoenyra rufilineata Butler, 1894

Species of butterfly

Neocoenyra rufilineata is a butterfly in the family Nymphalidae. It is found in Somalia.
