= Chloroselas arabica =

Scientific classification
- Domain: Eukaryota
- Kingdom: Animalia
- Phylum: Arthropoda
- Class: Insecta
- Order: Lepidoptera
- Family: Lycaenidae
- Genus: Chloroselas
- Species: C. arabica

Binomial name
- Chloroselas arabica (Riley, 1932)

Synonyms
- Desmolycaena arabica Riley, 1932

Species of butterfly

Chloroselas arabica is a butterfly in the family Lycaenidae. It is found in Yemen and Somaliland.
