= Euchrysops migiurtiniensis =

Scientific classification
- Domain: Eukaryota
- Kingdom: Animalia
- Phylum: Arthropoda
- Class: Insecta
- Order: Lepidoptera
- Family: Lycaenidae
- Genus: Euchrysops
- Species: E. migiurtiniensis

Binomial name
- Euchrysops migiurtiniensis Stempffer, 1946

Species of butterfly

Euchrysops migiurtiniensis is a butterfly in the family Lycaenidae. It is found in Somaliland.
