= Cigaritis gilletti =

Scientific classification
- Kingdom: Animalia
- Phylum: Arthropoda
- Clade: Pancrustacea
- Class: Insecta
- Order: Lepidoptera
- Family: Lycaenidae
- Genus: Cigaritis
- Species: C. gilletti

Binomial name
- Cigaritis gilletti (Riley, 1925)

Synonyms
- Apharitis gilletti Riley, 1925

Species of butterfly

Cigaritis gilletti is a butterfly in the family Lycaenidae. It is found in Somalia.
