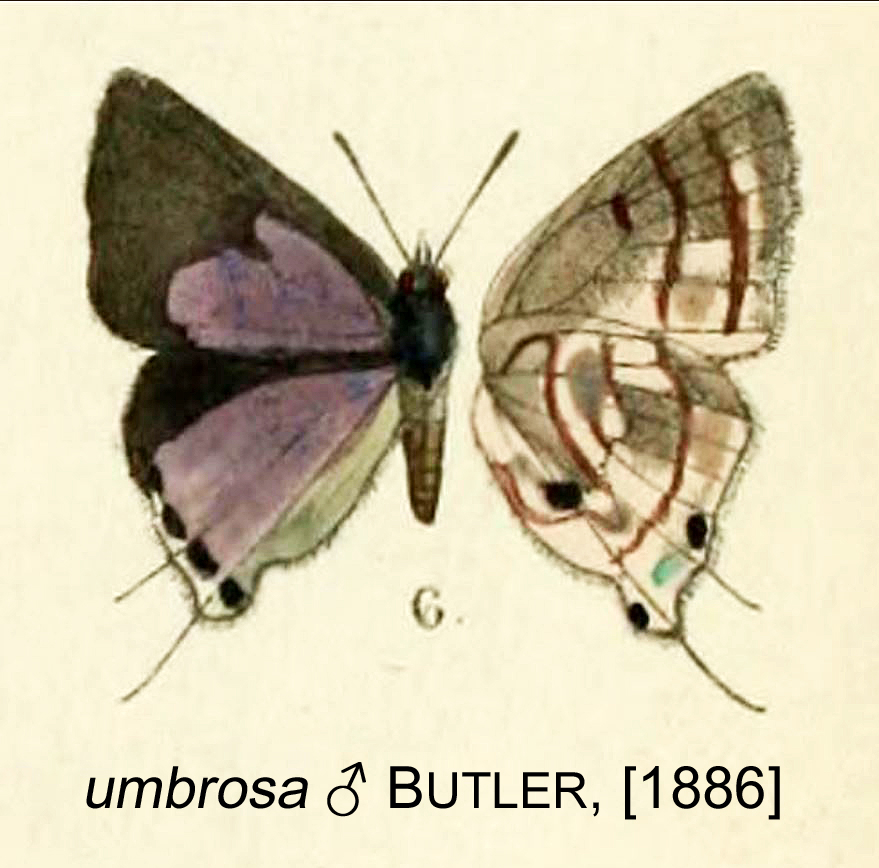

Scientific classification
- Kingdom: Animalia
- Phylum: Arthropoda
- Class: Insecta
- Order: Lepidoptera
- Family: Lycaenidae
- Genus: Iolaus
- Species: I. umbrosa

Binomial name
- Iolaus umbrosa (Butler, 1886)

Synonyms
- Hypolycaena umbrosa Butler, 1886; Iolaus (Epamera) umbrosa

= Iolaus umbrosa =

Species of butterfly

Iolaus umbrosa is a butterfly in the family Lycaenidae. It is found in southern Somalia and eastern Kenya. The habitat consists of arid savanna.

The larvae feed on Loranthus species.
