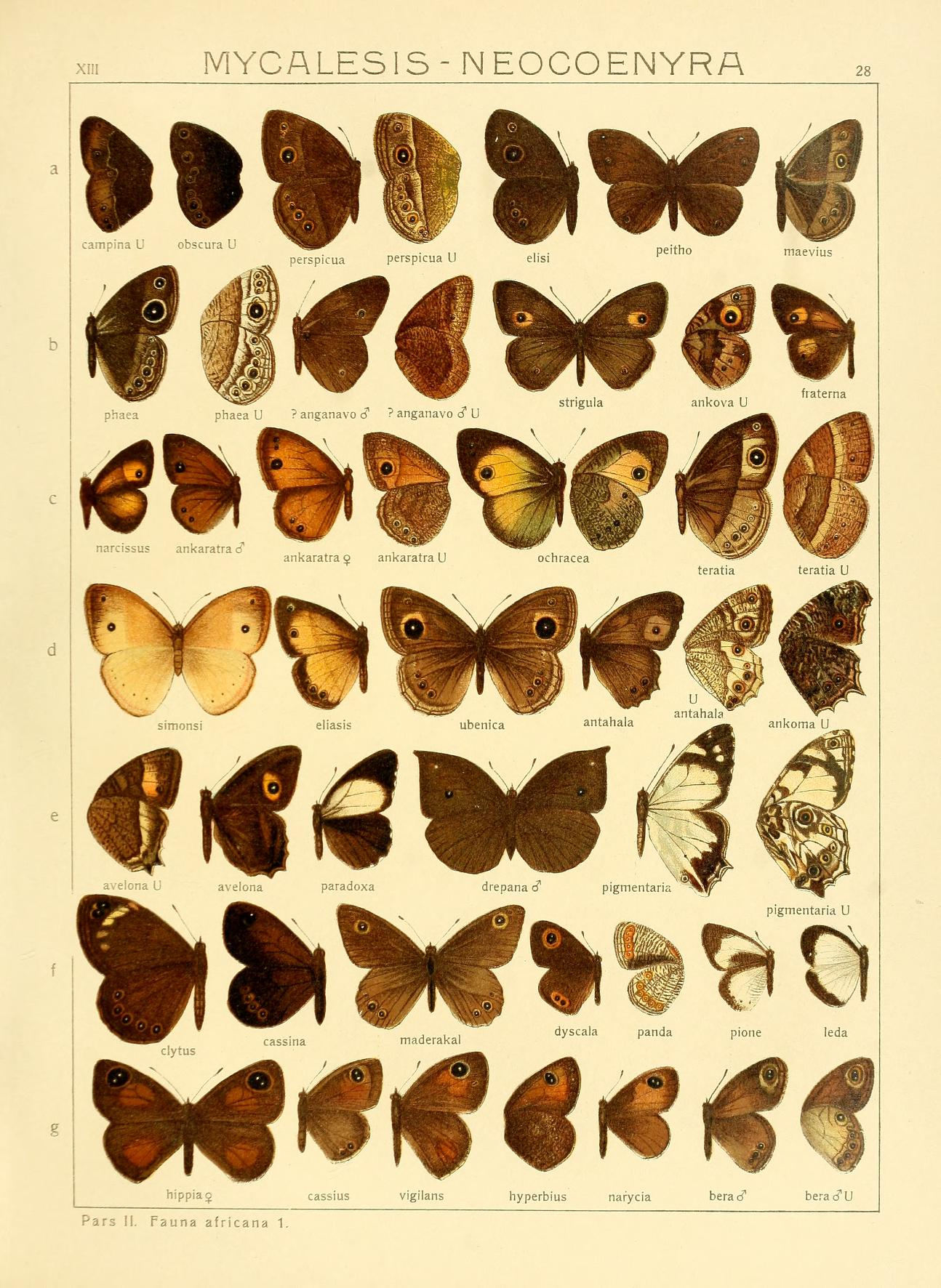
- In Adalbert Seitz's Fauna Africana

Scientific classification
- Domain: Eukaryota
- Kingdom: Animalia
- Phylum: Arthropoda
- Class: Insecta
- Order: Lepidoptera
- Family: Nymphalidae
- Genus: Physcaeneura
- Species: P. leda

Binomial name
- Physcaeneura leda (Gerstaecker, 1871)

Synonyms
- Periplysia leda Gerstaecker, 1871

= Physcaeneura leda =

Species of butterfly

Physcaeneura leda is a butterfly in the family Nymphalidae. It is found along the coast of Kenya, as well as in north-eastern Tanzania and southern Somalia. The habitat consists of dense woodland, forest margins and grassy forest clearings from sea-level to 1,850 meters.

The larvae feed on Poaceae species.
