= Tarucus quadratus =

Scientific classification
- Domain: Eukaryota
- Kingdom: Animalia
- Phylum: Arthropoda
- Class: Insecta
- Order: Lepidoptera
- Family: Lycaenidae
- Genus: Tarucus
- Species: T. quadratus

Binomial name
- Tarucus quadratus Ogilvie-Grant, 1899

Species of butterfly

Tarucus quadratus is a butterfly in the family Lycaenidae. It is found in Yemen (Socotra) and Somalia.
