= Baliochila fragilis =

Scientific classification
- Domain: Eukaryota
- Kingdom: Animalia
- Phylum: Arthropoda
- Class: Insecta
- Order: Lepidoptera
- Family: Lycaenidae
- Genus: Baliochila
- Species: B. fragilis

Binomial name
- Baliochila fragilis Stempffer & Bennett, 1953

Species of butterfly

Baliochila fragilis, the fragile buff, is a butterfly in the family Lycaenidae. It is found in southern Somalia, eastern Kenya and northern Tanzania. Its habitat consists of deciduous thorn-bush country, forests and woodland.
