= Chloroselas ogadenensis =

Scientific classification
- Domain: Eukaryota
- Kingdom: Animalia
- Phylum: Arthropoda
- Class: Insecta
- Order: Lepidoptera
- Family: Lycaenidae
- Genus: Chloroselas
- Species: C. ogadenensis

Binomial name
- Chloroselas ogadenensis Jackson, 1966

Species of butterfly

Chloroselas ogadenensis is a butterfly in the family Lycaenidae. It is found in Somalia.
