= Cesa waggae =

Scientific classification
- Domain: Eukaryota
- Kingdom: Animalia
- Phylum: Arthropoda
- Class: Insecta
- Order: Lepidoptera
- Family: Lycaenidae
- Subfamily: Aphnaeinae
- Genus: Cesa; Seven, 1997
- Species: C. waggae

Binomial name
- Cesa waggae (Sharpe, 1898)

Synonyms
- Genus: Jacksonia Heath, 1997; Species: Spindasis waggae Sharpe, 1898

Species of butterfly

Cesa is a genus of butterflies in the family Lycaenidae erected by Selma Seven Çalışkan in 1997. It contains only one species, Cesa waggae, first described by Emily Sharpe in 1898. It is found in Somalia and Ethiopia.
