= Tarucus kulala =

Scientific classification
- Kingdom: Animalia
- Phylum: Arthropoda
- Class: Insecta
- Order: Lepidoptera
- Family: Lycaenidae
- Genus: Tarucus
- Species: T. kulala

Binomial name
- Tarucus kulala Evans, 1955

Species of butterfly

Tarucus kulala, the Turkana Pierrot, is a butterfly in the family Lycaenidae. It is found in Somalia (Ogaden) and northern Kenya.

Adults have been recorded feeding from the flowers of Loewia tanaensis.

The larvae probably feed on Ziziphus species.
