= Anthene pitmani =

Pitman's hairtail

Conservation status
- Least Concern (IUCN 3.1)

Scientific classification
- Kingdom: Animalia
- Phylum: Arthropoda
- Class: Insecta
- Order: Lepidoptera
- Family: Lycaenidae
- Genus: Anthene
- Species: A. pitmani

Binomial name
- Anthene pitmani Stempffer, 1936

Synonyms
- Anthene (Anthene) pitmani

Species of butterfly

Anthene pitmani, the Pitman's hairtail, is a butterfly in the family Lycaenidae. It is found in Ethiopia, Somalia and Kenya. The habitat consists of savanna.

The larvae feed on the young shoots of Acacia abyssinica, Acacia lahai, Acacia stenocarpa and Dichrostachys species. They are associated with the ant species Crematogaster gerstaeckeri.

== Subspecies ==
- Anthene pitmani pitmani (central, western and northern Kenya, Ethiopia)
- Anthene pitmani somalina Stempffer, 1936 (Somalia)
