= Iolaus tajoraca =

Scientific classification
- Kingdom: Animalia
- Phylum: Arthropoda
- Class: Insecta
- Order: Lepidoptera
- Family: Lycaenidae
- Genus: Iolaus
- Species: I. tajoraca

Binomial name
- Iolaus tajoraca Walker, 1870

Synonyms
- Iolaus (Epamera) tajoraca; Iolaus nursei var. ertli Aurivillius, 1916

Species of butterfly

Iolaus tajoraca is a butterfly in the family Lycaenidae. It is found in Djibouti, Ethiopia, Somalia, Kenya, Uganda and Tanzania. The habitat consists of arid savanna.

The larvae feed on Oncocalyx fischeri, Plicosepalus curviflorus, Plicosepalus kalachariensis, Plicosepalus meridianus and Englerina kagehensis.

== Subspecies ==
- Iolaus tajoraca tajoraca (Djibouti, Ethiopia, Somalia, northern Kenya, northern Uganda)
- Iolaus tajoraca ertli Aurivillius, 1916 (Tanzania, eastern Kenya)
