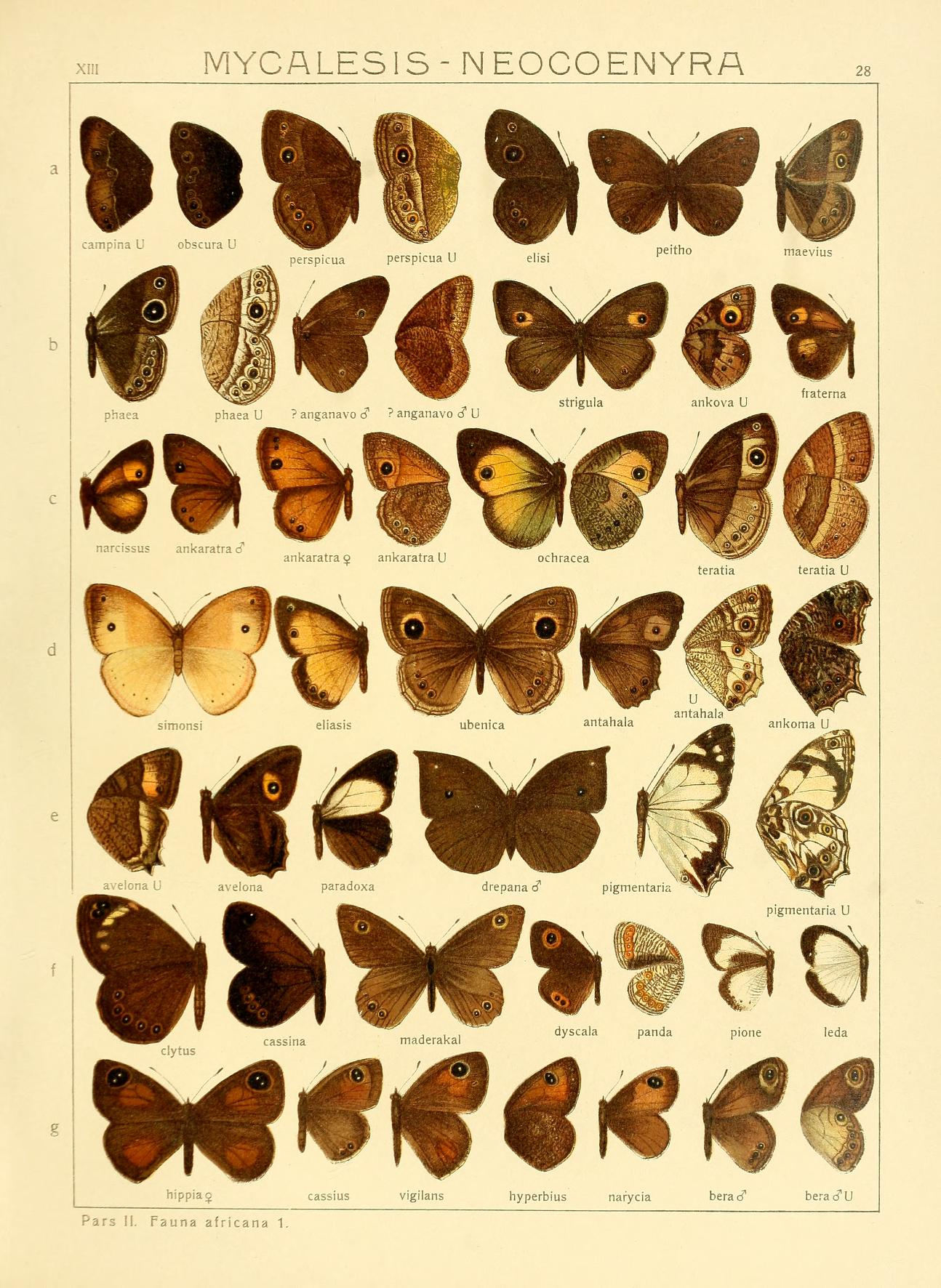
- In Adalbert Seitz's Fauna Africana

Scientific classification
- Domain: Eukaryota
- Kingdom: Animalia
- Phylum: Arthropoda
- Class: Insecta
- Order: Lepidoptera
- Family: Nymphalidae
- Genus: Lasiommata
- Species: L. maderakal

Binomial name
- Lasiommata maderakal (Guérin-Méneville, 1849)

Synonyms
- Satyrus maderakal Guérin-Méneville, 1849

= Lasiommata maderakal =

Species of butterfly

Lasiommata maderakal is a butterfly in the family Nymphalidae. It is found in Ethiopia and Somaliland.
