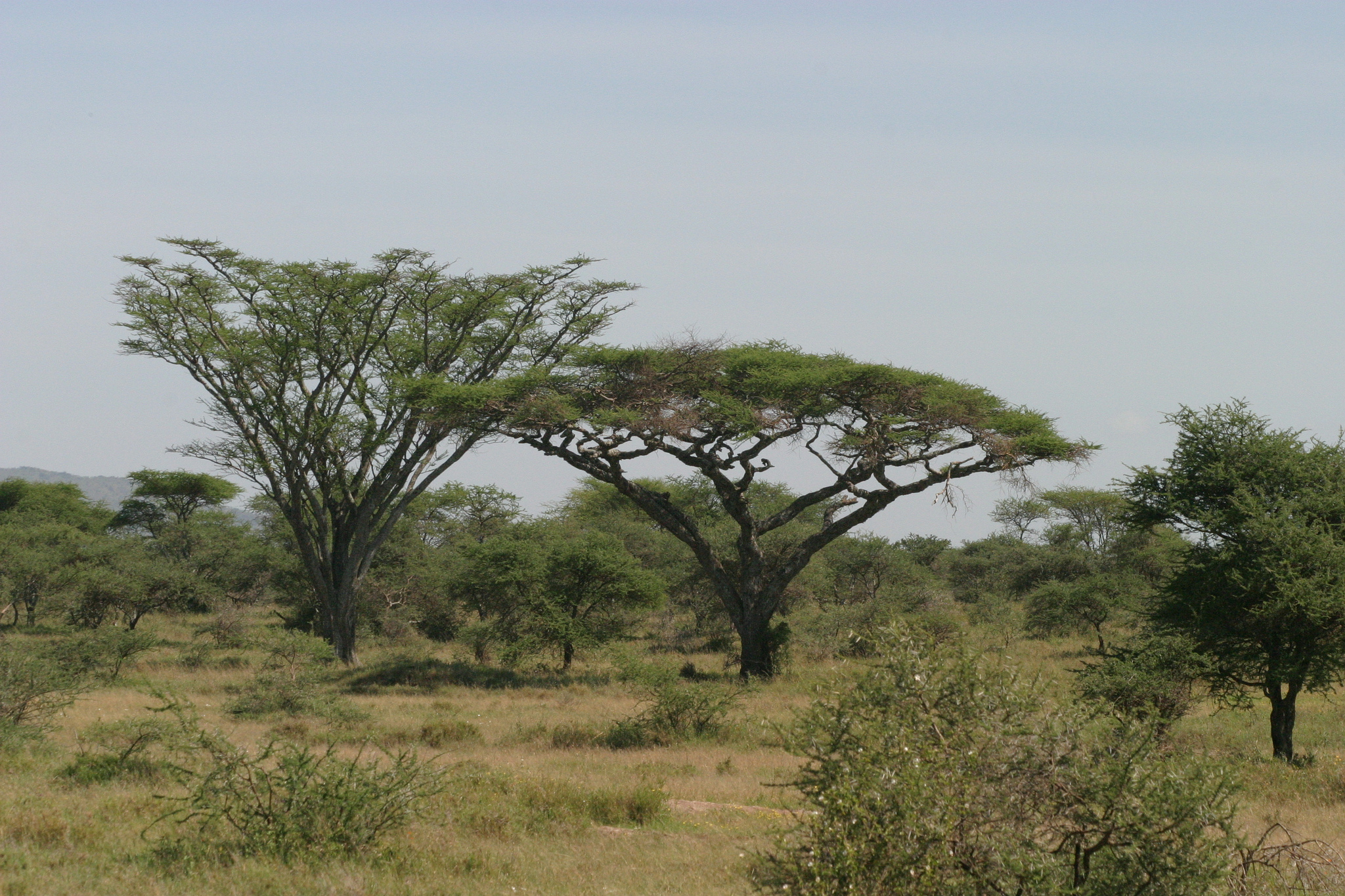
- An umbrella acacia (Vachellia tortilis), right, and a flat top acacia (Vachellia abyssinica), left.

Scientific classification
- Kingdom: Plantae
- Clade: Embryophytes
- Clade: Tracheophytes
- Clade: Spermatophytes
- Clade: Angiosperms
- Clade: Eudicots
- Clade: Rosids
- Order: Fabales
- Family: Fabaceae
- Subfamily: Caesalpinioideae
- Clade: Mimosoid clade
- Genus: Vachellia
- Species: V. abyssinica

Binomial name
- Vachellia abyssinica (Hochst. ex. Benth.) Kyal. & Boatwr.

Subspecies
- Vachellia abyssinica subsp. abyssinica (Hochst. ex. Benth.) Kyal. & Boatwr.; Vachellia abyssinica subsp. calophylla (Brenan) Kyal. & Boatwr.

Synonyms
- Acacia abyssinica Hochst. ex Benth.

= Vachellia abyssinica =

Species of legume

Vachellia abyssinica, the flat top acacia, is a tree up to 16 m (52 ft) tall.

== Description ==
Its bark is reddish-brown on older trees. On younger trees it is pale yellowish-brown, peeling off in papery wads. Young twigs are softly hairy. The thorns are aligned in straight pairs at nodes. Leaves are in pinnae pairs of 20-40; the leaflets are very small, up to 4 × 0.75 mm. The inflorescence is arranged in white spherical heads. The involucel is located in the lower half of the peduncle. The seed pods are dehiscent.

== Distribution ==
The species is present from Ethiopia southwards to Zimbabwe and Mozambique, and westwards to Angola.
