= Alaena johanna =

Johanna's Zulu

Scientific classification
- Domain: Eukaryota
- Kingdom: Animalia
- Phylum: Arthropoda
- Class: Insecta
- Order: Lepidoptera
- Family: Lycaenidae
- Genus: Alaena
- Species: A. johanna

Binomial name
- Alaena johanna Sharpe, 1890

Species of butterfly

Alaena johanna, the Johanna's Zulu, is a butterfly in the family Lycaenidae. It is found in Ethiopia, Somalia, Kenya and Tanzania. The habitat consists of savanna and rocky hillsides at altitudes ranging from 1,200 to 1,900 metres.

The larvae probably feed on lichens.

== Subspecies ==
- Alaena johanna johanna (Ethiopia, Somalia, central Kenya, Tanzania)
- Alaena johanna tsavoa Jackson, 1966 (eastern Kenya)
