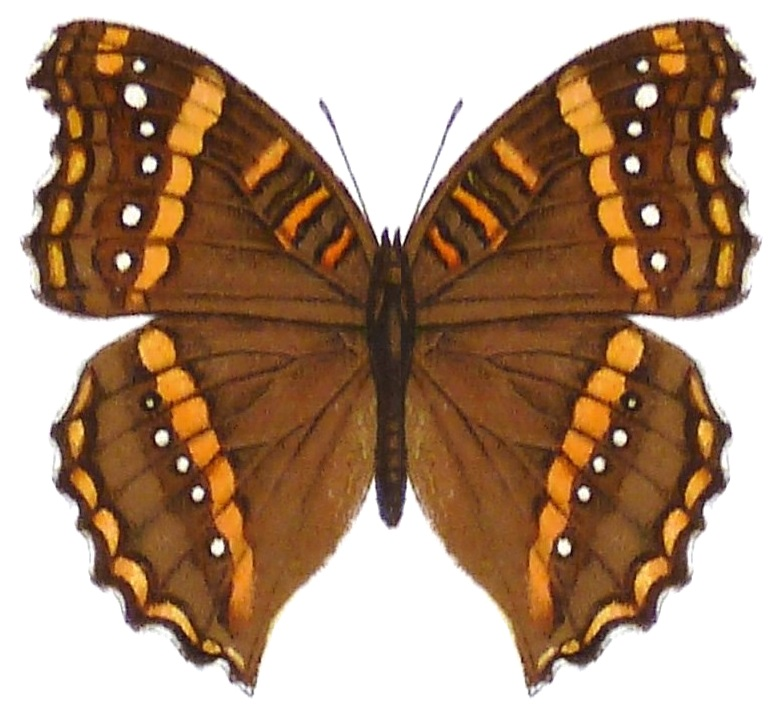
- Precis limnoria taveta

Scientific classification
- Domain: Eukaryota
- Kingdom: Animalia
- Phylum: Arthropoda
- Class: Insecta
- Order: Lepidoptera
- Family: Nymphalidae
- Genus: Precis
- Species: P. limnoria

Binomial name
- Precis limnoria (Klug, 1845)

Synonyms
- Vanessa limnoria Klug, 1845; Precis limnoria niveistictus Gabriel, 1954; Precis taveta Rogenhofer, 1891

= Precis limnoria =

White-spotted commodore

Species of butterfly

Precis limnoria, the white-spotted commodore, is a butterfly in the family Nymphalidae. It is found in Saudi Arabia, Yemen, Ethiopia, Somalia, Kenya and Tanzania. The habitat consists of savanna and thorn-bush country, especially rocky terrain.

The larvae feed on Asystasia species.

== Subspecies ==
- Precis limnoria limnoria — south-western Saudi Arabia, Yemen, Ethiopia, Somalia
- Precis limnoria taveta Rogenhofer, 1891 — southern Ethiopia, Kenya, northern Tanzania
