= Chilades naidina =

Scientific classification
- Domain: Eukaryota
- Kingdom: Animalia
- Phylum: Arthropoda
- Class: Insecta
- Order: Lepidoptera
- Family: Lycaenidae
- Genus: Chilades
- Species: C. naidina

Binomial name
- Chilades naidina (Butler, 1886)

Synonyms
- Catochrysops naidina Butler, 1886; Lepidochrysops naidina; Everes kedonga Grose-Smith, 1898; Lycaena pulchristriata Bethune-Baker, 1905

Species of butterfly

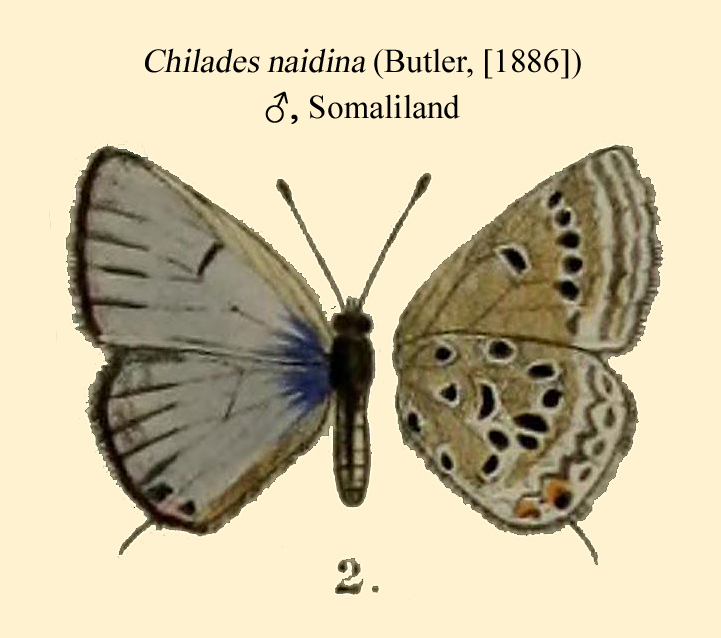
NaidinaButler1886

Chilades naidina is a butterfly in the family Lycaenidae. It is found in Ethiopia, Somalia, eastern Uganda, Kenya and Tanzania. The habitat consists of grassy areas in savanna, especially dry Acacia savanna.

Both sexes are attracted to flowers.

The larvae feed on Acacia species.
