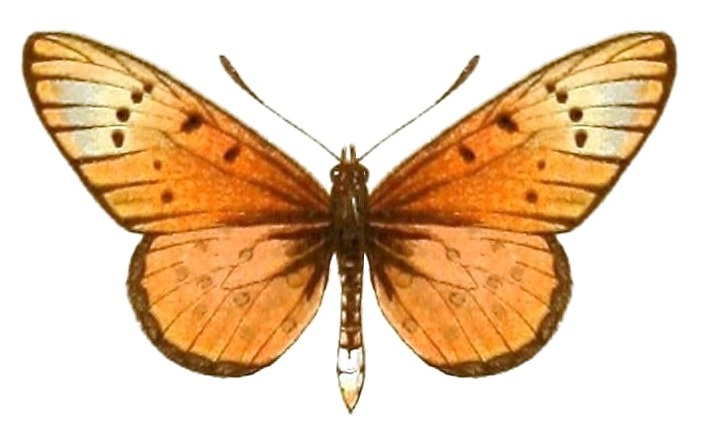
- In Seitz (1925)

Scientific classification
- Kingdom: Animalia
- Phylum: Arthropoda
- Class: Insecta
- Order: Lepidoptera
- Family: Nymphalidae
- Genus: Acraea
- Species: A. braesia

Binomial name
- Acraea braesia Godman, 1885 Godman, F.D., 1885 List of the Lepidoptera collected by H. H. Johnston during his recent expedition to Kiliman-njaro Proc. zool. Soc. Lond. 1885 : 537-541

Synonyms
- Acraea (Acraea) braesia; Acraea leucosoma Staudinger, 1885; Acraea regalis Oberthür, 1893; Acraea mystica Neave, 1904; Acraea nohara ochracea Le Doux, 1931; Acraea bresia f. lucida Talbot, 1932; Acraea braesia f. leucofasciata Stoneham, 1943

= Acraea braesia =

Species of butterfly

Acraea braesia is a butterfly in the family Nymphalidae. It is found in Ethiopia, Somalia, north-eastern Uganda, eastern and northern Kenya and north-eastern Tanzania.

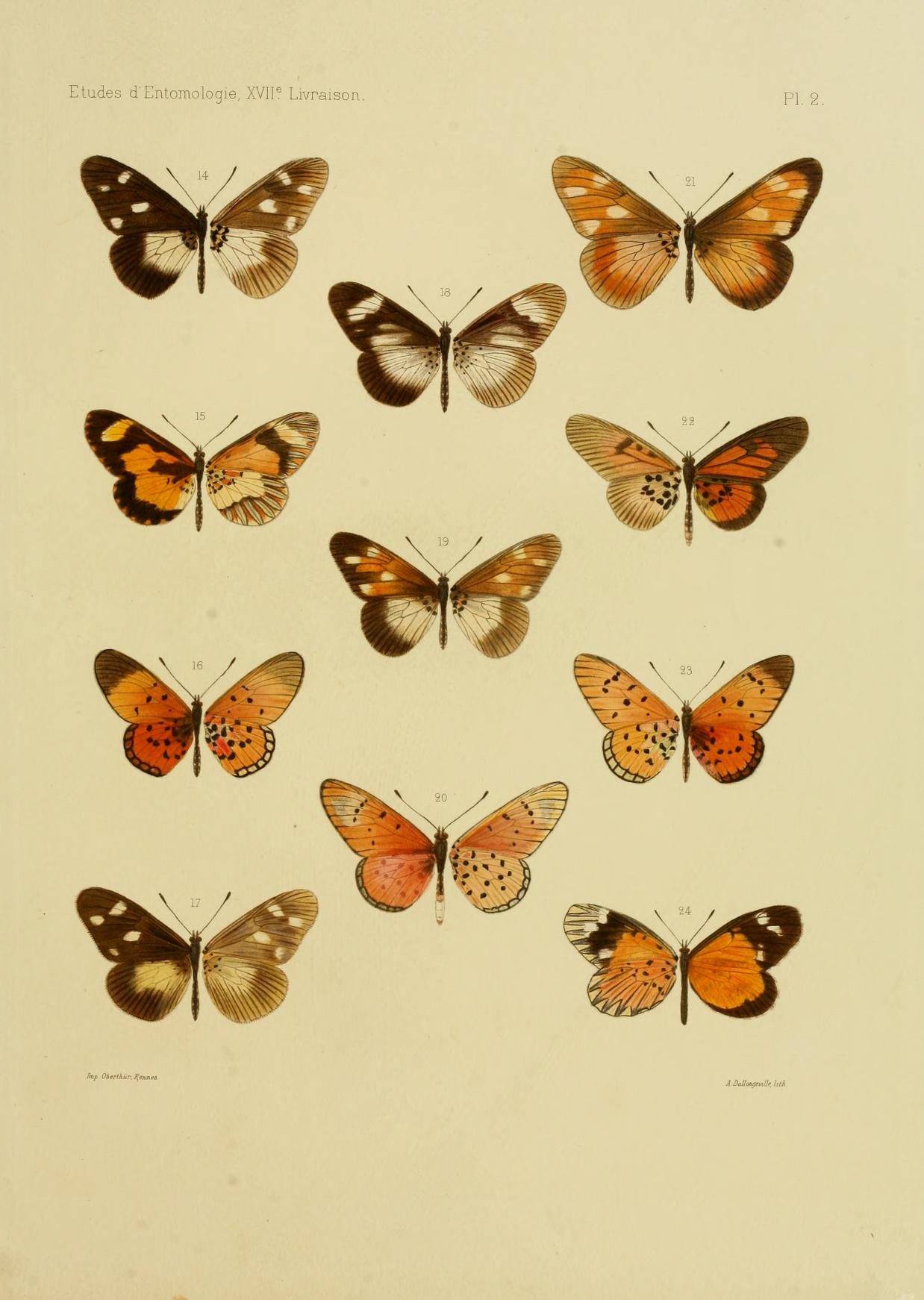
Figure 20

== Description ==
A. braesia Godm. Forewing long and narrow with the distal margin nearly straight, basal half of the upper surface reddish yellow-brown, apical half transparent grey with free yellow spots at the distal margin and black marginal band, which is but little widened at the apex. Hindwing above orange-yellow, often with rose-red tinge, at the base scarcely blackish and with black, unspotted marginal band, proximally somewhat undulate; the discal dots often only showing through from beneath; under surface of the hindwing more or less reddish, with distinct black dots and almost streak-shaped light yellow marginal spots. German and British East Africa; Abyssinia. - f. regalis Oberth. (55 e) has beyond discal dots 3 to 6 on the fore wing a well defined, almost transparent grey subapical band, but the forewing is otherwise densely scaled. German and British East Africa.

== Biology ==
The habitat consists of dry thornbush country.

== Taxonomy ==
It is a member of the Acraea caecilia species group. See also Pierre & Bernaud, 2014.
