= Axiocerses jacksoni =

Scientific classification
- Kingdom: Animalia
- Phylum: Arthropoda
- Clade: Pancrustacea
- Class: Insecta
- Order: Lepidoptera
- Family: Lycaenidae
- Genus: Axiocerses
- Species: A. jacksoni

Binomial name
- Axiocerses jacksoni Stempffer, 1948

Species of butterfly

Axiocerses jacksoni is a butterfly in the family Lycaenidae. It was described by Stempffer in 1948. It is found in Ethiopia, Somalia, and northern Kenya.
