= Spialia mangana =

Scientific classification
- Domain: Eukaryota
- Kingdom: Animalia
- Phylum: Arthropoda
- Class: Insecta
- Order: Lepidoptera
- Family: Hesperiidae
- Genus: Spialia
- Species: S. mangana

Binomial name
- Spialia mangana (Rebel, 1899)

Synonyms
- Hesperia (Pyrgus) mangana Rebel, 1899

Species of butterfly

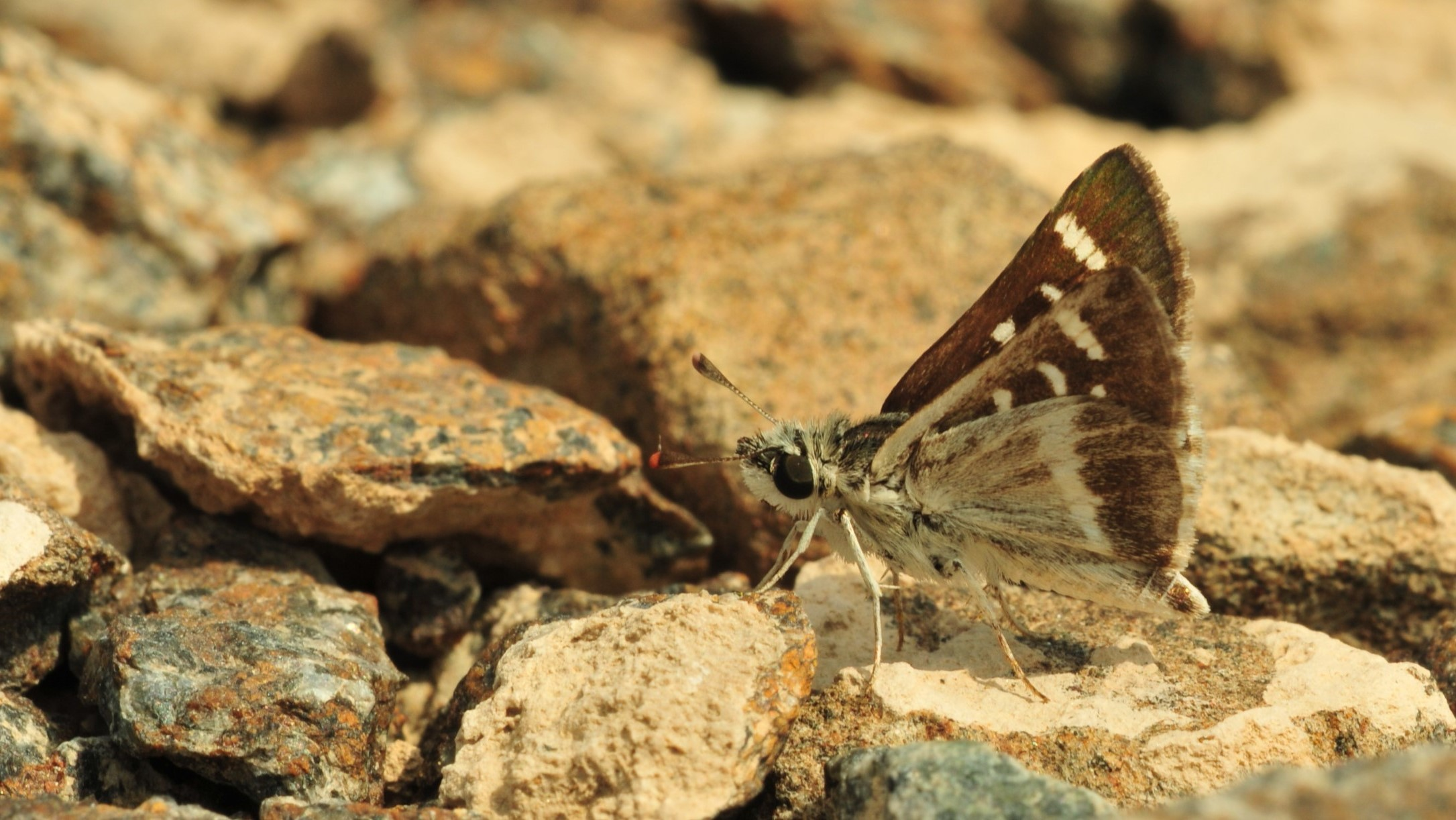
Arabian grizzled skipper in United Arab Emirates

Spialia mangana, the Arabian grizzled skipper, is a butterfly in the family Hesperiidae. It was described by Rebel in 1899. It is found in Yemen, Oman, The United Arab Emirates, Somalia, Ethiopia, Uganda and northern Kenya.
