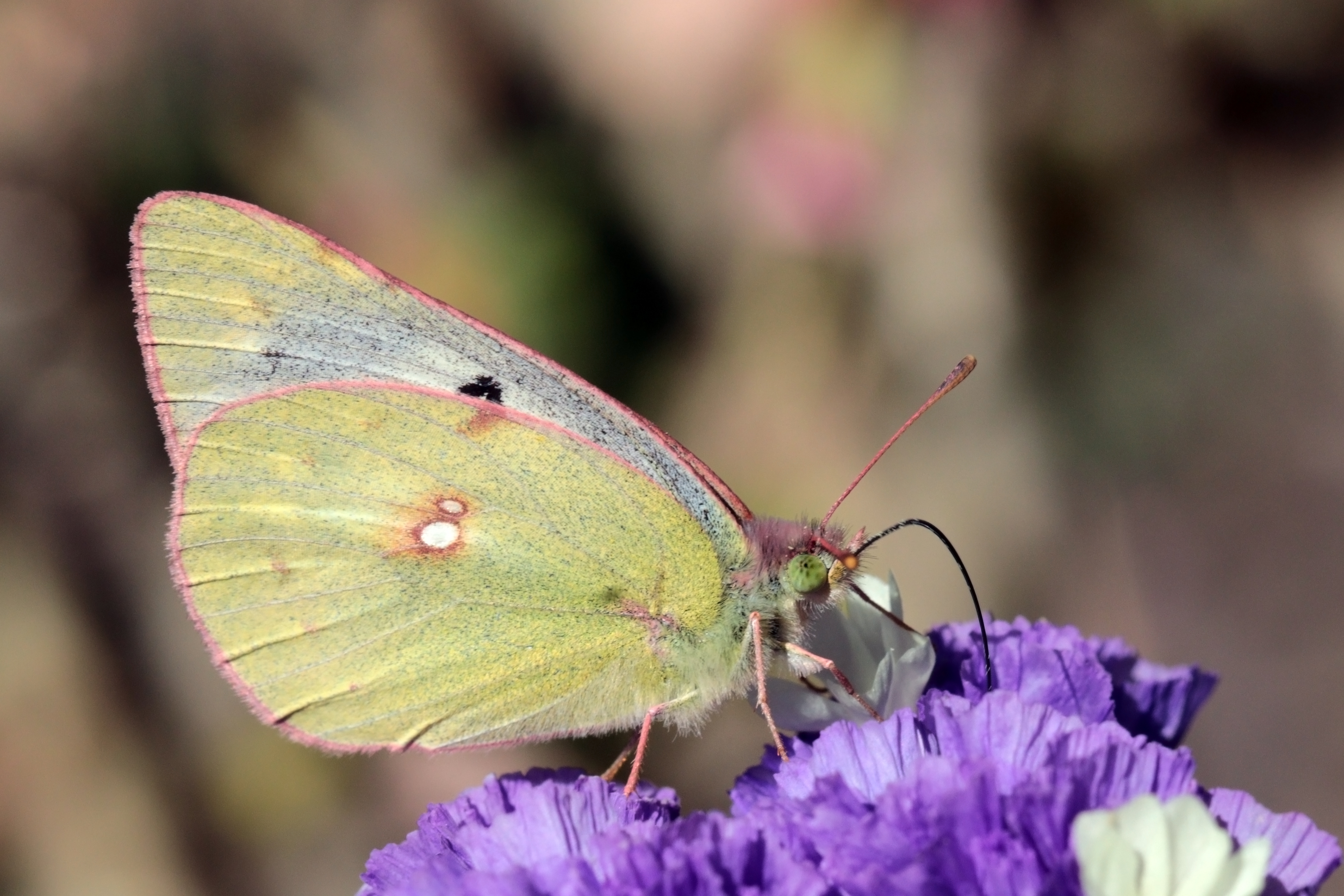
- C. e. pseudohecate, Ethiopia

Scientific classification
- Kingdom: Animalia
- Phylum: Arthropoda
- Class: Insecta
- Order: Lepidoptera
- Family: Pieridae
- Genus: Colias
- Species: C. electo

Binomial name
- Colias electo (Linnaeus, 1763)

Synonyms
- List: Papilio electo Linnaeus, 1763; Papilio electra Linnaeus, 1767; Papilio palaeno Stoll, 1781; Colias aurivillius Keferstein, 1883; Colias electo electo f. overlaeti Berger, 1940; Colias electo f. millari Stoneham, 1957; Colias electo ab. eremna Vári, 1976; Colias electo electo f. elysium Kroon, 1985; Colias electo electo ab. capensis McLeod and McLeod, 2002; Colias electo electo ab. inconstantis McLeod, 2004; Colias electo electo ab. memorabilis McLeod, 2004; Colias electo electo ab. pallidula McLeod, 2004; Colias hecate Strecker, 1900; Colias electo hecate f. katangae Berger, 1940; Colias electo hecate f. bunda Berger, 1940; Colias electo hecate f. elisabethae Berger, 1940; Colias electo meneliki f. bafanae Berger, 1940; Colias electo philbyi f. bafanae Berger, 1953; Colias electo philbyi f. pauper Berger, 1953; Colias electo philbyi Berger, 1953; Colias electo pseudohecate f. licina Berger, 1940; Colias electo pseudohecate f. lecerfi Berger, 1940; Colias electo pseudohecate f. splendens Berger, 1940; Colias electo pseudohectae ab. dormonti Dufrane, 1947; Colias electo f. affricana Stoneham, 1957; Colias electo f. ambreana Stoneham, 1957

= Colias electo =

Species of butterfly

Colias electo, the African clouded yellow or lucerne butterfly, is a butterfly of the family Pieridae. It is found in eastern and southern Africa, as well as Arabia. The habitat consists of temperate and montane grasslands.

The wingspan is 35–40 millimetres (1.4–1.6 in) for males and 32–40 mm (1.3–1.6 in) for females. Adults are on the wing throughout the year, with a peak from April to August.

The larvae feed on Medicago sativa, Trifolium, Vicia and Robinia pseudoacacia.

== Subspecies ==
- C. e. electo (South Africa, southern Mozambique, Namibia, Zimbabwe and Zambia)
- C. e. hecate Strecker, 1900 (Angola, southern Zaire, northern Zambia and north-western Malawi)
- C. e. pseudohecate Berger, 1940 (Malawi, Tanzania, Kenya, Uganda, eastern Zaire, Rwanda, Burundi, southern Sudan, southern Ethiopia and northern Somalia)
- C. e. meneliki Berger, 1940 (central and northern Ethiopia and Eritrea)
- C. e. philbyi Berger, 1953 (southern and western Arabia)
- C. e. manengoubensis Darge, 1968 (eastern Nigeria, Cameroon)
