= Ypthima simplicia =

Scientific classification
- Kingdom: Animalia
- Phylum: Arthropoda
- Class: Insecta
- Order: Lepidoptera
- Family: Nymphalidae
- Genus: Ypthima
- Species: Y. simplicia

Binomial name
- Ypthima simplicia Butler, 1876

Species of butterfly

Ypthima simplicia is a butterfly in the family Nymphalidae. It is found in southern Sudan, Ethiopia, Somalia, Kenya, and northern Tanzania. The habitat consists of montane and semi-montane grassland. It has been recorded at elevations up to about 2,200 m in Tanzania.

The species has been recorded from locations such as the Ngong Hills in Kenya and Mount Longido in Tanzania.
