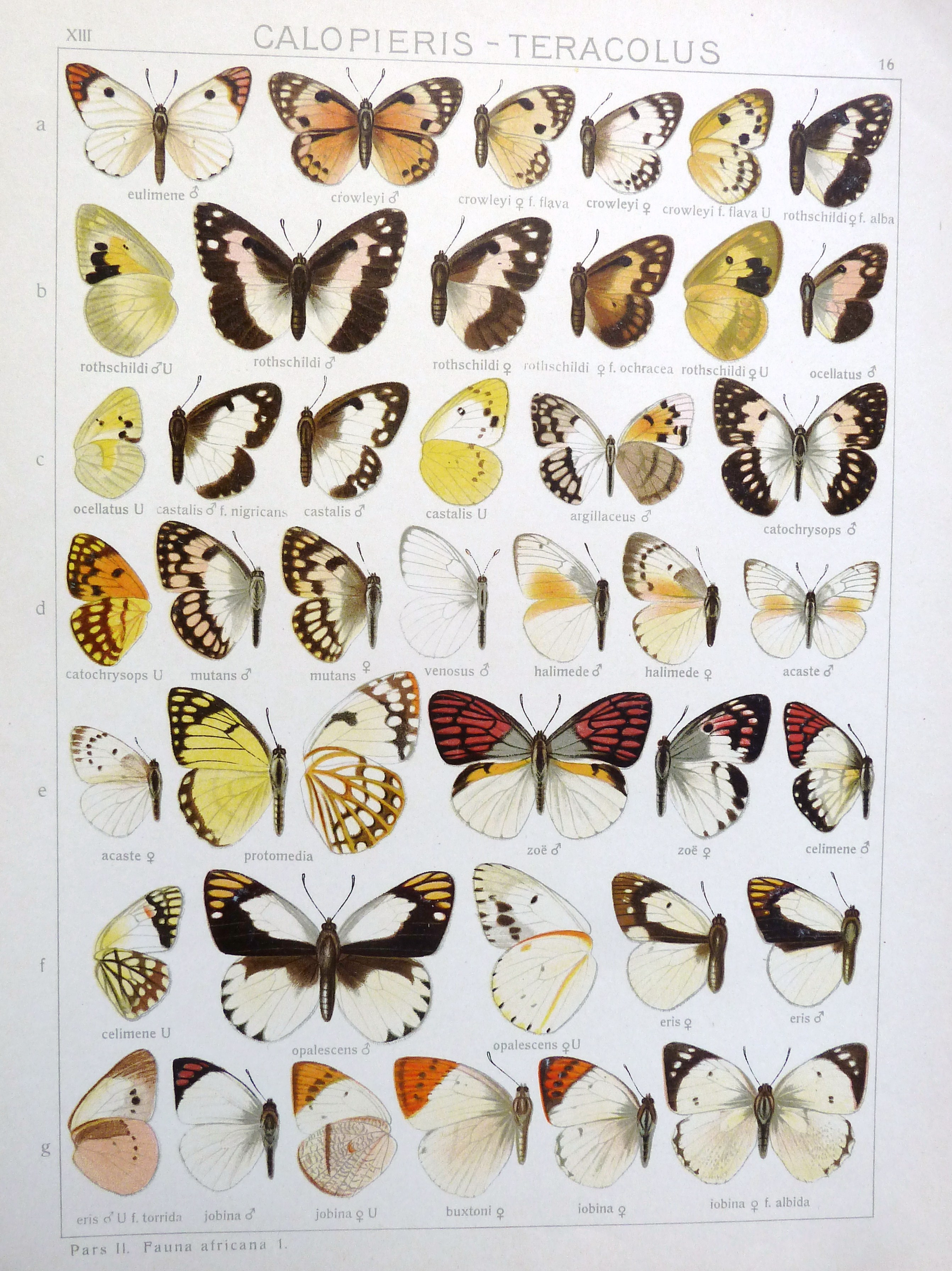
- in Seitz d

Scientific classification
- Kingdom: Animalia
- Phylum: Arthropoda
- Class: Insecta
- Order: Lepidoptera
- Family: Pieridae
- Genus: Colotis
- Species: C. halimede

Binomial name
- Colotis halimede (Klug, 1829)

Synonyms
- Pontia halimede Klug, 1829; Colotis (Colotis) halimede; Pontia acaste Klug, 1829; Pieris polycaste Boisduval, 1836; Anthocharis leo Butler, 1865; Teracolus coelestis Swinhoe, 1884; Teracolus halimede halimede f. swinhoei Rothschild, 1921; Teracolus halimede aurivillii Rothschild, 1921; Colotis halimede aurivillii f. restricta Rothschild, 1921; Teracolus halimede maxima Talbot, 1939

= Colotis halimede =

Species of butterfly

Colotis halimede, the yellow patch tip or yellow patch white, is a butterfly in the family Pieridae. It is found in Senegal, Mali, Nigeria, Niger, Sudan, Uganda, Ethiopia, Djibouti, Arabia, Somalia, Kenya, Tanzania and North Africa. The habitat consists of dry savanna.

Adults have a fast flight, and prefer the flowers of Capparis species. The larvae feed on Capparis and Cadaba species.

== Subspecies ==
- Colotis halimede halimede (Senegal, Mali, north-eastern Nigeria, Niger, Sudan, northern Uganda, Ethiopia, Djibouti, western and southern Arabia)
- Colotis halimede australis Talbot, 1939 (northern and central Tanzania)
- Colotis halimede restricta Talbot, 1939 (Ethiopia, Somalia, Kenya)
