= Abantis meneliki =

Scientific classification
- Kingdom: Animalia
- Phylum: Arthropoda
- Clade: Pancrustacea
- Class: Insecta
- Order: Lepidoptera
- Family: Hesperiidae
- Genus: Abantis
- Species: A. meneliki

Binomial name
- Abantis meneliki Berger, 1979

Species of butterfly

Abantis meneliki is a butterfly in the family Hesperiidae. It is found in Ethiopia, Somalia and Djibouti.
