= Anthene opalina =

Opal hairtail

Conservation status
- Least Concern (IUCN 3.1)

Scientific classification
- Kingdom: Animalia
- Phylum: Arthropoda
- Class: Insecta
- Order: Lepidoptera
- Family: Lycaenidae
- Genus: Anthene
- Species: A. opalina

Binomial name
- Anthene opalina Stempffer, 1946

Synonyms
- Anthene (Anthene) opalina

Species of butterfly

Anthene opalina, the opal hairtail, is a butterfly in the family Lycaenidae. It is found in southern Ethiopia, Somalia, northern and eastern Kenya and Tanzania (Dar es Salaam). The habitat consists of dry savanna.
