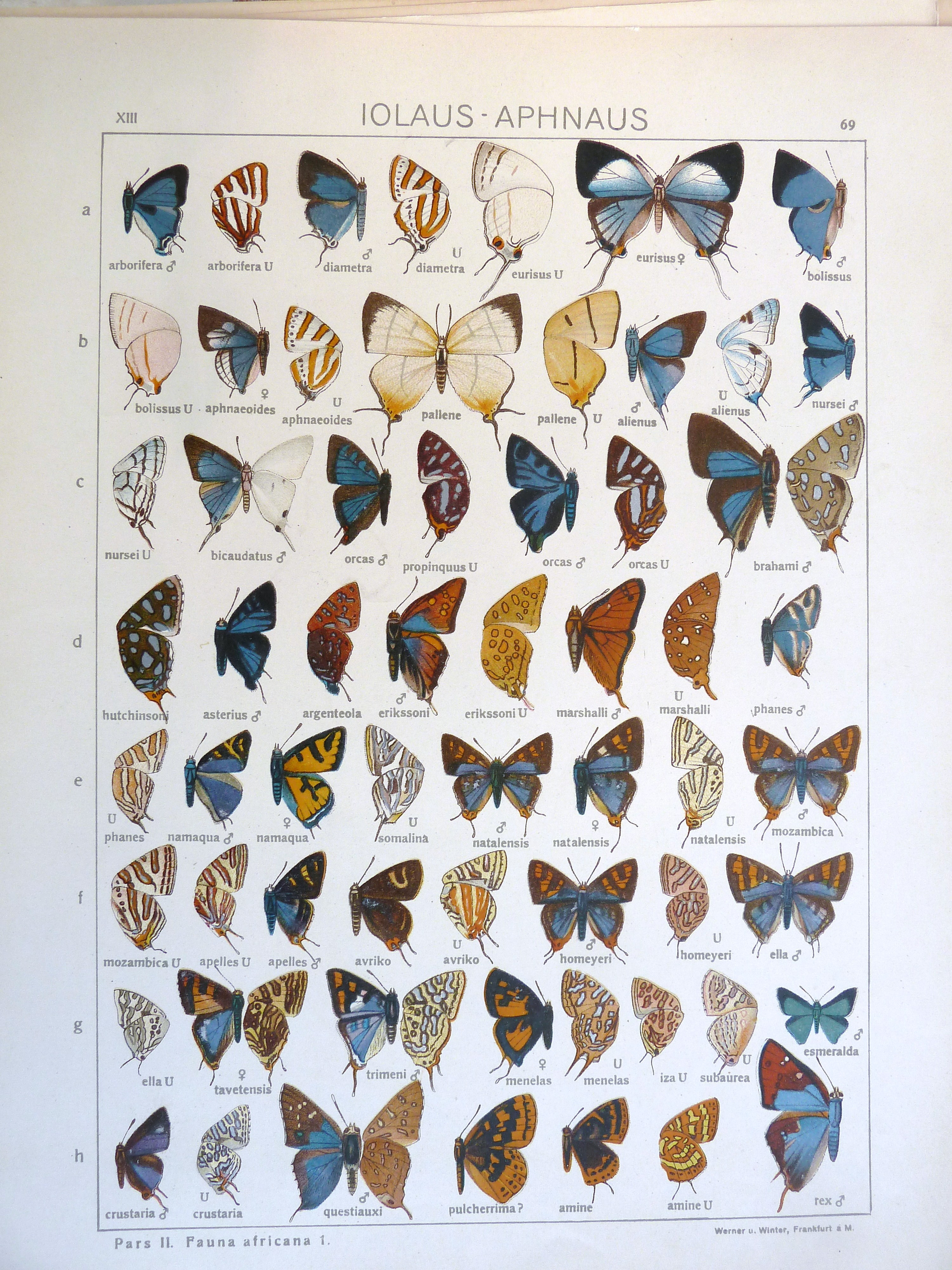
- Seitz ..Fauna Africana Taf69 (line e)

Scientific classification
- Kingdom: Animalia
- Phylum: Arthropoda
- Clade: Pancrustacea
- Class: Insecta
- Order: Lepidoptera
- Family: Lycaenidae
- Genus: Cigaritis
- Species: C. somalina

Binomial name
- Cigaritis somalina (Butler, 1886)

Synonyms
- Spindasis somalina Butler, 1886

= Cigaritis somalina =

Somali silverline

Species of butterfly

Cigaritis somalina, the Somali silverline, is a butterfly in the family Lycaenidae. It is found in Yemen, Ethiopia, Somalia and northern Kenya. The habitat consists of arid savanna, often along water courses.

Adults are attracted to flowers at the edge of irrigated fields.

The larvae possibly feed on Acacia species.
