= Lepidochrysops fumosa =

Scientific classification
- Kingdom: Animalia
- Phylum: Arthropoda
- Class: Insecta
- Order: Lepidoptera
- Family: Lycaenidae
- Genus: Lepidochrysops
- Species: L. fumosa

Binomial name
- Lepidochrysops fumosa (Butler, 1886)

Synonyms
- Catochrysops fumosa Butler, 1886

Species of butterfly

Lepidochrysops fumosa is a butterfly in the family Lycaenidae. It was described by Arthur Gardiner Butler in 1886. It is found in Ethiopia and Somalia.
