= Anthene janna =

Scientific classification
- Domain: Eukaryota
- Kingdom: Animalia
- Phylum: Arthropoda
- Class: Insecta
- Order: Lepidoptera
- Family: Lycaenidae
- Genus: Anthene
- Species: A. janna

Binomial name
- Anthene janna Gabriel, 1949

Synonyms
- Anthene (Anthene) janna

Species of butterfly

Anthene janna is a butterfly in the family Lycaenidae. It is found in Ethiopia, Somalia and north-eastern Kenya. The habitat consists of dry savanna.
