= Pontia distorta =

Scientific classification
- Kingdom: Animalia
- Phylum: Arthropoda
- Class: Insecta
- Order: Lepidoptera
- Family: Pieridae
- Genus: Pontia
- Species: P. distorta

Binomial name
- Pontia distorta (Butler, 1886)

Synonyms
- Synchloe distorta Butler, 1886

Species of butterfly

Pontia distorta, the small meadow white, is a butterfly in the family Pieridae. It is found in Ethiopia, Somalia, northern Kenya and possibly north-eastern Tanzania. The habitat consists of sub-desert thorn-bush areas.
