= Euchrysops brunneus =

Scientific classification
- Domain: Eukaryota
- Kingdom: Animalia
- Phylum: Arthropoda
- Class: Insecta
- Order: Lepidoptera
- Family: Lycaenidae
- Genus: Euchrysops
- Species: E. brunneus

Binomial name
- Euchrysops brunneus Bethune-Baker, 1923

Species of butterfly

Euchrysops brunneus, the brown blue, is a butterfly in the family Lycaenidae. It is found in southern Ethiopia, Somalia, central and western Kenya and eastern Uganda. The habitat consists of savanna.
