= Ypthima jacksoni =

Scientific classification
- Kingdom: Animalia
- Phylum: Arthropoda
- Class: Insecta
- Order: Lepidoptera
- Family: Nymphalidae
- Genus: Ypthima
- Species: Y. jacksoni

Binomial name
- Ypthima jacksoni Kielland, 1982

Species of butterfly

Ypthima jacksoni, or Jackson's ringlet, is a butterfly in the family Nymphalidae. It is found in Ethiopia, Somalia, and along the coast of Kenya. The habitat consists of moist and dry savanna.
