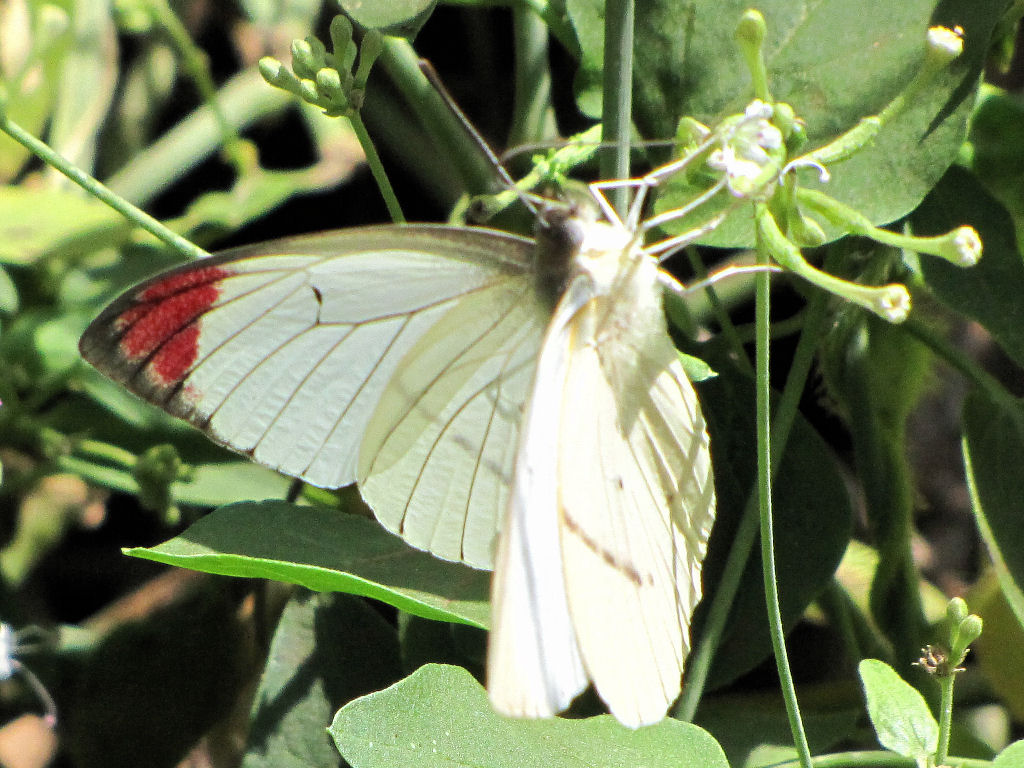

Scientific classification
- Kingdom: Animalia
- Phylum: Arthropoda
- Class: Insecta
- Order: Lepidoptera
- Family: Pieridae
- Genus: Colotis
- Species: C. hetaera

Binomial name
- Colotis hetaera (Gerstaecker, 1871)

Synonyms
- Callosune hetaera Gerstaecker, 1871; Colotis (Colotis) hetaera; Teracolus puniceus Butler, 1888; Teracolus foliaceus Butler, 1894; Teracolus puniceus f. flavescens Aurivillius, 1910; Teracolus hetaera ab. sulphureus Aurivillius, 1910; Teracolus puniceus ab. albomaculatus Aurivillius, 1910; Colotis hetaera f. strix Talbot, 1939; Colotis ankolensis Stoneham, 1940; Colotis hetaera f. mirabilis Talbot, 1939; Colotis hetaera f. immaculatus Stoneham, 1940; Colotis hetaera f. subchromiferous Stoneham, 1957; Teracolus hetaera aspasia Ungemach, 1932; Teracolus hetaera aspasia f. thiochroa Ungemach, 1932; Teracolus lorti Sharpe, 1896; Teracolus ludoviciae Butler, 1897

= Colotis hetaera =

Species of butterfly

Colotis hetaera, the eastern purple tip, is a butterfly in the family Pieridae. It is found in Senegal, Mali, Nigeria, Niger, Sudan, Uganda, Ethiopia, Djibouti, Arabia, Somalia, Kenya, Tanzania and North Africa. The habitat consists of savannah, but penetrating the open parts of evergreen forests.

Adults have a fast flight.

The larvae feed on Capparis, Maerua, Boscia, Cadaba and Ritchiea species.

== Subspecies ==
- Colotis hetaera hetaera (coast of Kenya, north-eastern Tanzania)
- Colotis hetaera ankolensis Stoneham, 1940 (central Kenya, northern Tanzania, Uganda, Democratic Republic of the Congo)
- Colotis hetaera aspasia (Ungemach, 1932) (south-western Ethiopia, southern Sudan, northern Uganda)
- Colotis hetaera lorti (Sharpe, 1896) (northern Kenya, south-eastern Ethiopia, Somalia)
