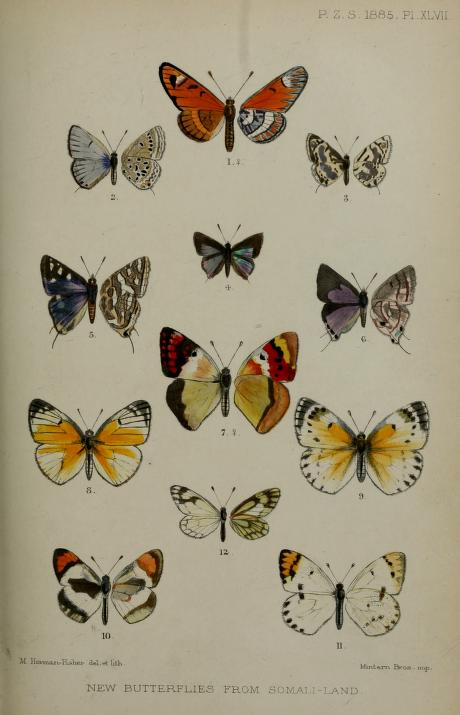

Scientific classification
- Kingdom: Animalia
- Phylum: Arthropoda
- Class: Insecta
- Order: Lepidoptera
- Family: Nymphalidae
- Genus: Acraea
- Species: A. mirabilis

Binomial name
- Acraea mirabilis Butler, 1886

Synonyms
- Acraea (Acraea) mirabilis

= Acraea mirabilis =

Marvelous acraea

Species of butterfly

Acraea mirabilis, the marvelous acraea, is a butterfly in the family Nymphalidae. It is found in Somalia, south-eastern Ethiopia and north-eastern Kenya.

== Description ==
A. mirabilis Btlr. is a very distinct species and differs from all others in the under surface of the hindwing, but is evidently best attached to this subgroup as an aberrant form. Both wings above dark orange-yellow nearly to the distal margin, costal margin of the fore wing and distal margin of both wings narrowly black; the veins at the distal margin black; the forewing with a black transverse spot at the end of the cell and in cellules 4 to 6 with a light yellowish subapical spot, broadly margined with black at both sides; the forewing beneath grey instead of blackish at the costal and distal margins. On the under surface of the hindwing the discal dots are streak-like and united into a somewhat curved line, which distally bounds the basal area; the basal area is grey between the basal and discal streaks, with reddish stripes at least in la to lc, 4, 5, 7 and the cell; between the discal streaks and the marginal band runs an unspotted light yellow to whitish median band 1 to 2 mm. in breadth; the marginal band is about 3 mm. in breadth, proximally bounded by a black line and has a greenish or bluish grey ground-colour; the small marginal spots are scarcely lighter than the ground colour, broader than long and proximally bounded by shallow black lunules; between these lunules and the proximal edge of the marginal band runs in each cellule a broad reddish streak. The marginal spots are thus formed as in the species of the following subgroups; from these, however, mirabilis differs in the absence of the discal dots of the forewing. Somaliland.

== Taxonomy ==
Acraea mirabilis, with its sister-species Acraea miranda, is a member of the Acraea natalica species group. See also Acraea caecilia species group and Pierre & Bernaud, 2014
