= List of butterflies of Chad =

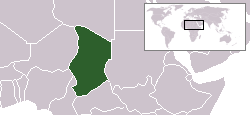
Location of Chad

This is a list of butterflies of Chad. About 46 species are known from Chad, 1 of which is endemic.

== Papilionidae ==
=== Papilioninae ===
==== Leptocercini ====
- Graphium angolanus baronis (Ungemach, 1932)
- Graphium ridleyanus (White, 1843)
- Graphium leonidas (Fabricius, 1793)
- Graphium latreillianus theorini (Aurivillius, 1881)
- Graphium ucalegonides (Staudinger, 1884)

== Pieridae ==
=== Coliadinae ===
- Eurema brigitta (Stoll, [1780])
- Eurema hecabe solifera (Butler, 1875)
- Catopsilia florella (Fabricius, 1775)
- Colias croceus (Geoffroy, 1785)

=== Pierinae ===
- Colotis aurora evarne (Klug, 1829)
- Colotis celimene sudanicus (Aurivillius, 1905)
- Colotis danae eupompe (Klug, 1829)
- Colotis ephyia (Klug, 1829)
- Colotis euippe euippe (Linnaeus, 1758)
- Colotis euippe mirei Bernardi, 1960
- Colotis fausta (Olivier, 1807)
- Colotis liagore (Klug, 1829)
- Colotis phisadia (Godart, 1819)
- Colotis pleione nilus Talbot, 1942
- Colotis protomedia (Klug, 1829)
- Calopieris eulimene (Klug, 1829)
- Eronia leda (Boisduval, 1847)
- Pinacopterix eriphia tritogenia (Klug, 1829)
- Euchloe falloui (Allard, 1867)

==== Pierini ====
- Pontia daplidice (Linnaeus, 1758)
- Pontia glauconome Klug, 1829
- Dixeia doxo (Godart, 1819)
- Belenois aurota (Fabricius, 1793)

== Lycaenidae ==
=== Miletinae ===
==== Miletini ====
- Lachnocnema abyssinica Libert, 1996

=== Aphnaeinae ===
- Cigaritis baghirmii (Stempffer, 1946)
- Cigaritis buchanani (Rothschild, 1921)
- Cigaritis nilus (Hewitson, 1865)
- Axiocerses harpax kadugli Talbot, 1935

=== Theclinae ===
- Myrina silenus (Fabricius, 1775)
- Iolaus sudanicus Aurivillius, 1905
- Deudorix livia (Klug, 1834)

=== Polyommatinae ===
==== Polyommatini ====
- Tarucus legrasi Stempffer, 1948
- Tarucus rosacea (Austaut, 1885)
- Tarucus ungemachi Stempffer, 1942
- Azanus moriqua (Wallengren, 1857)
- Chilades eleusis (Demaison, 1888)

== Nymphalidae ==
=== Satyrinae ===
==== Melanitini ====
- Melanitis libya Distant, 1882

=== Charaxinae ===
==== Charaxini ====
- Charaxes viola Butler, 1866
- Charaxes nichetes leopardinus Plantrou, 1974

=== Nymphalinae ===
==== Nymphalini ====
- Hypolimnas misippus (Linnaeus, 1764)

=== Heliconiinae ===
==== Acraeini ====
- Acraea caecilia (Fabricius, 1781)

== See also ==
- List of ecoregions in Chad
- Geography of Chad
