= List of butterflies of Niger =

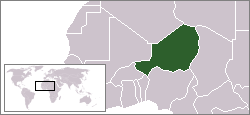
Location of Niger

This is a list of butterflies of Niger. About 54 species are known from Niger, none of which are endemic.

== Papilionidae ==
=== Papilioninae ===
==== Papilionini ====
- Papilio demodocus Esper, [1798]

==== Leptocercini ====
- Graphium angolanus baronis (Ungemach, 1932)

== Pieridae ==
=== Coliadinae ===
- Eurema brigitta (Stoll, [1780])
- Eurema hecabe solifera (Butler, 1875)
- Catopsilia florella (Fabricius, 1775)

=== Pierinae ===
- Colotis amata calais (Cramer, 1775)
- Colotis antevippe (Boisduval, 1836)
- Colotis celimene angusi Rothschild, 1921
- Colotis celimene sudanicus (Aurivillius, 1905)
- Colotis chrysonome (Klug, 1829)
- Colotis danae eupompe (Klug, 1829)
- Colotis evagore antigone (Boisduval, 1836)
- Colotis halimede (Klug, 1829)
- Colotis liagore (Klug, 1829)
- Colotis phisadia (Godart, 1819)
- Pinacopterix eriphia tritogenia (Klug, 1829)
- Nepheronia buquetii (Boisduval, 1836)

==== Pierini ====
- Appias epaphia (Cramer, [1779])
- Pontia daplidice (Linnaeus, 1758)
- Pontia glauconome Klug, 1829
- Belenois aurota (Fabricius, 1793)
- Belenois creona (Cramer, [1776])
- Belenois gidica (Godart, 1819)

== Lycaenidae ==
=== Aphnaeinae ===
- Cigaritis nilus (Hewitson, 1865)
- Zeritis neriene Boisduval, 1836
- Axiocerses amanga borealis Aurivillius, 1905

=== Theclinae ===
- Iolaus alienus bicaudatus Aurivillius, 1905
- Iolaus sudanicus Aurivillius, 1905

=== Polyommatinae ===
==== Lycaenesthini ====
- Anthene princeps (Butler, 1876)

==== Polyommatini ====
- Leptotes pirithous (Linnaeus, 1767)
- Leptotes pulchra (Murray, 1874)
- Tarucus balkanicus (Freyer, 1843)
- Tarucus legrasi Stempffer, 1948
- Tarucus rosacea (Austaut, 1885)
- Tarucus theophrastus (Fabricius, 1793)
- Zizeeria knysna (Trimen, 1862)
- Azanus ubaldus (Stoll, 1782)
- Euchrysops nilotica (Aurivillius, 1904)
- Chilades eleusis (Demaison, 1888)
- Lepidochrysops polydialecta (Bethune-Baker, [1923])

== Nymphalidae ==
=== Danainae ===
==== Danaini ====
- Danaus chrysippus alcippus (Cramer, 1777)

=== Satyrinae ===
==== Melanitini ====
- Melanitis libya Distant, 1882

==== Satyrini ====
- Ypthima condamini nigeriae Kielland, 1982

=== Charaxinae ===
==== Charaxini ====
- Charaxes jasius Poulton, 1926
- Charaxes epijasius Reiche, 1850
- Charaxes legeri Plantrou, 1978

=== Nymphalinae ===
==== Nymphalini ====
- Junonia oenone (Linnaeus, 1758)
- Junonia orithya madagascariensis Guenée, 1865
- Hypolimnas misippus (Linnaeus, 1764)

=== Limenitinae ===
==== Adoliadini ====
- Hamanumida daedalus (Fabricius, 1775)

=== Heliconiinae ===
==== Acraeini ====
- Acraea neobule Doubleday, 1847

== Hesperiidae ==
=== Coeliadinae ===
- Coeliades forestan (Stoll, [1782])

=== Pyrginae ===
==== Celaenorrhinini ====
- Sarangesa phidyle (Walker, 1870)

==== Carcharodini ====
- Spialia spio (Linnaeus, 1764)

=== Hesperiinae ===
==== Aeromachini ====
- Platylesches chamaeleon (Mabille, 1891)

== See also ==
- List of moths of Niger
- Wildlife of Niger
