= Small orange tip =

Small orange tip or small orange tips may refer to

- Colotis, a genus of butterflies endemic to Africa and India commonly known as the orange tips or small orange tips
- Colotis etrida, a species of Colotis endemic to Southern India and Ceylon commonly known as the small orange tip or little orange tip
- Colotis evagore, a species of Colotis endemic to tropical Africa, the Arabian Peninsula, and Spain
