= Golden tip =

Golden tip may refer to

- Goodia lotifolia, a shrub species in the pea family
- Colotis hildebrandti, a butterfly from the genus Colotis endemic to Zambia, Malawi, and Kenya
