= Blue-spotted Arab =

Blue-spotted Arab may refer to:

- Colotis phisadia
- Colotis protractus
