= Yellow orange tip =

Yellow orange tip may refer to:

- Colotis auxo, a butterfly of Transvaal and Botswana
- Colotis incretus, a butterfly of Kenya, Burundi, Tanzania and Zambia
- Ixias pyrene, a butterfly of India, parts of the Himalayas, and parts of Indochina
