= Coast purple tip =

Coast purple tip may refer to

- Colotis erone, a butterfly endemic to Natal, Pondoland, Eswatini, and Transvaal
- Colotis hetaera, a butterfly endemic to Kenya and Tanzania
