= Sulphur orange tip =

Sulphur orange tip may refer to:

- Colotis auxo, a butterfly endemic to Transvaal and Botswana
- Colotis aurora, a butterfly of Africa and Asia
