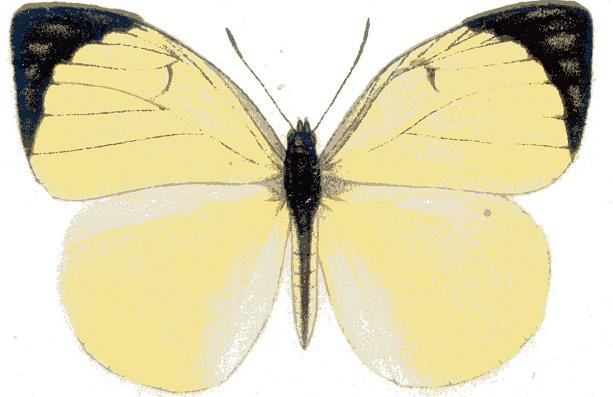
- Male
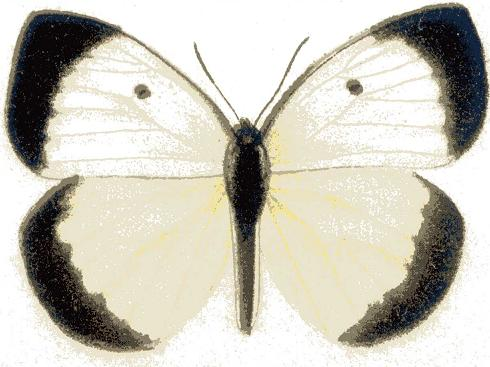
- Female

Scientific classification
- Kingdom: Animalia
- Phylum: Arthropoda
- Class: Insecta
- Order: Lepidoptera
- Family: Pieridae
- Genus: Colotis
- Species: C. mananhari

Binomial name
- Colotis mananhari (Ward, 1870)

Synonyms
- Pieris mananhari Ward, 1870; Colotis (Colotis) mananhari; Anthocharis flavida Mabille, 1877; Teracolus nothus Mabille, 1885

= Colotis mananhari =

Species of butterfly

Colotis mananhari is a butterfly in the family Pieridae. It is found on Madagascar. The habitat consists of unnatural grassland and anthropogenic environments.
