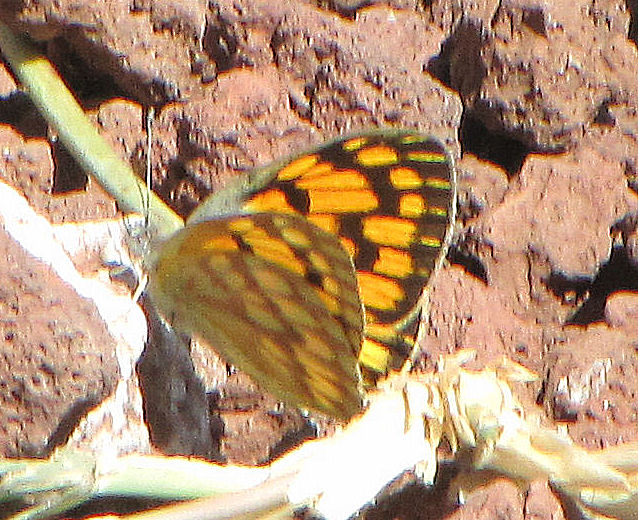
- C. d. doubledayi, Lake Manyara National Park, Tanzania

Scientific classification
- Kingdom: Animalia
- Phylum: Arthropoda
- Class: Insecta
- Order: Lepidoptera
- Family: Pieridae
- Genus: Colotis
- Species: C. doubledayi

Binomial name
- Colotis doubledayi (Hopffer, 1862)

Subspecies
- C. d. doubledayi; C. d. angolanus Talbot, 1929; C. d. flavulus Henning, Henning, Joannou & Woodhall, 1997

Synonyms
- Idmaeus doubledayi Hopffer, 1862; Idmaeus vesta Trimen, 1862; Idmais hewitsoni Kirby, 1871; Teracolus doubledayi Butler, 1897

= Colotis doubledayi =

Doubleday's tip

Species of butterfly

Colotis doubledayi, the Doubleday's tip or Doubleday's orange, is a butterfly of the family Pieridae. It is found in the Afrotropical realm.

The wingspan is 32–40 mm in males and 34–45 mm in females. The adults have two broods from September to October and April to May.

The larvae feed on Maerua schinzii.
