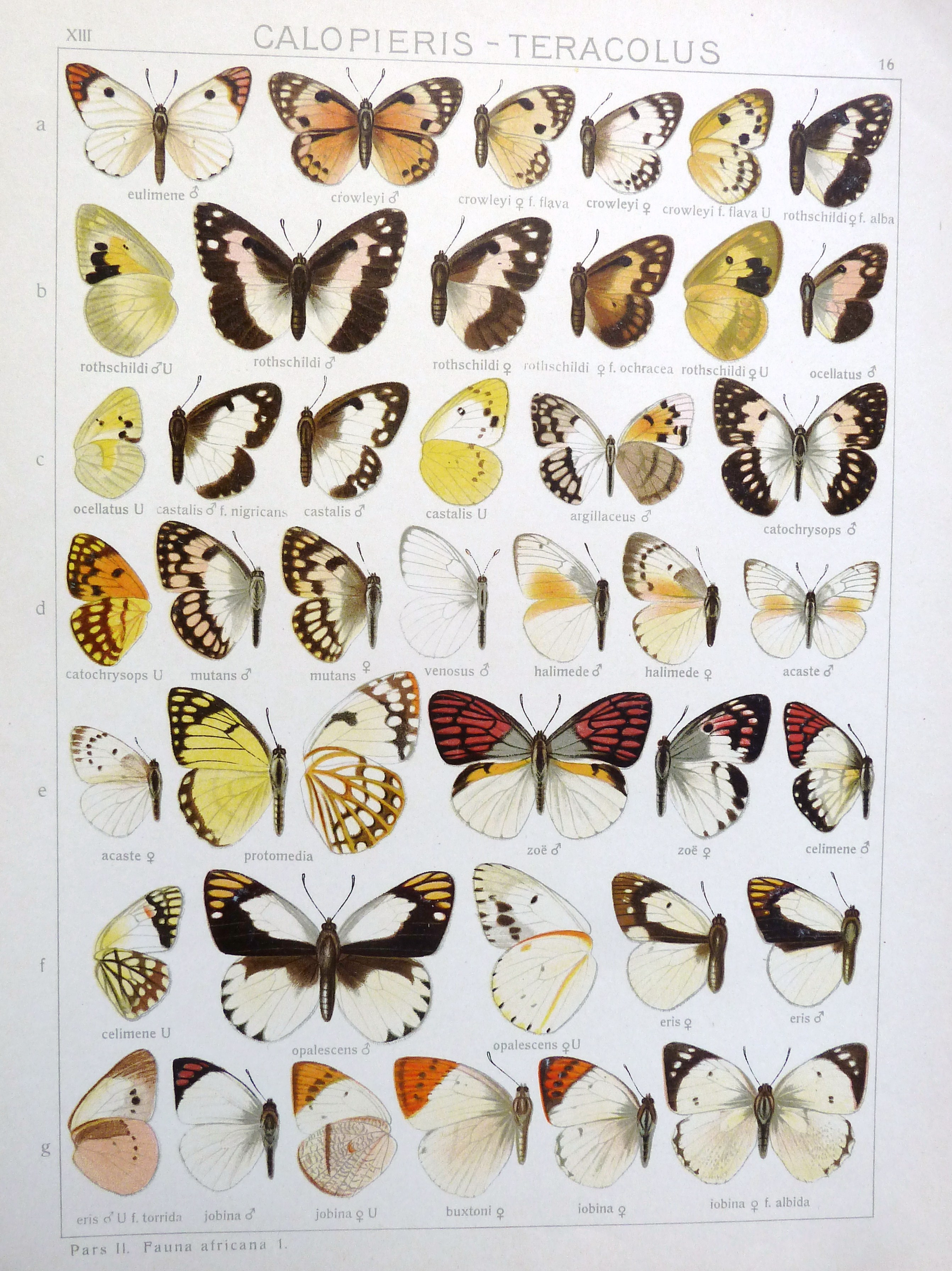
- in Adalbert Seitz d

Scientific classification
- Kingdom: Animalia
- Phylum: Arthropoda
- Class: Insecta
- Order: Lepidoptera
- Family: Pieridae
- Genus: Colotis
- Species: C. venosa

Binomial name
- Colotis venosa (Staudinger, 1885)

Synonyms
- Idmais venosa Staudinger, 1885; Colotis (Colotis) venosa; Colotis venosus f. lactea Talbot, 1939

= Colotis venosa =

Species of butterfly

Colotis venosa, the no patch tip, is a butterfly in the family Pieridae. It is found in southern Somalia, central and eastern Kenya, north-eastern Tanzania and southern Ethiopia. The habitat consists of very dry savannah.

The larvae feed on Capparis and Cadaba species.
