= Colotis lais =

Kalahari orange tip

Scientific classification
- Kingdom: Animalia
- Phylum: Arthropoda
- Class: Insecta
- Order: Lepidoptera
- Family: Pieridae
- Genus: Colotis
- Species: C. lais

Binomial name
- Colotis lais (Butler, 1876)

Synonyms
- Teracolus lais Butler, 1876; Colotis (Colotis) lais; Colotis lais f. felthami van Son, 1949

Species of butterfly

Colotis lais, the Kalahari orange tip, is a butterfly of the family Pieridae. It is found in southern Africa. The habitat consists of savanna.

The wingspan is 30–38 mm. The adults fly year-round. The larvae probably feed on Capparaceae species.
