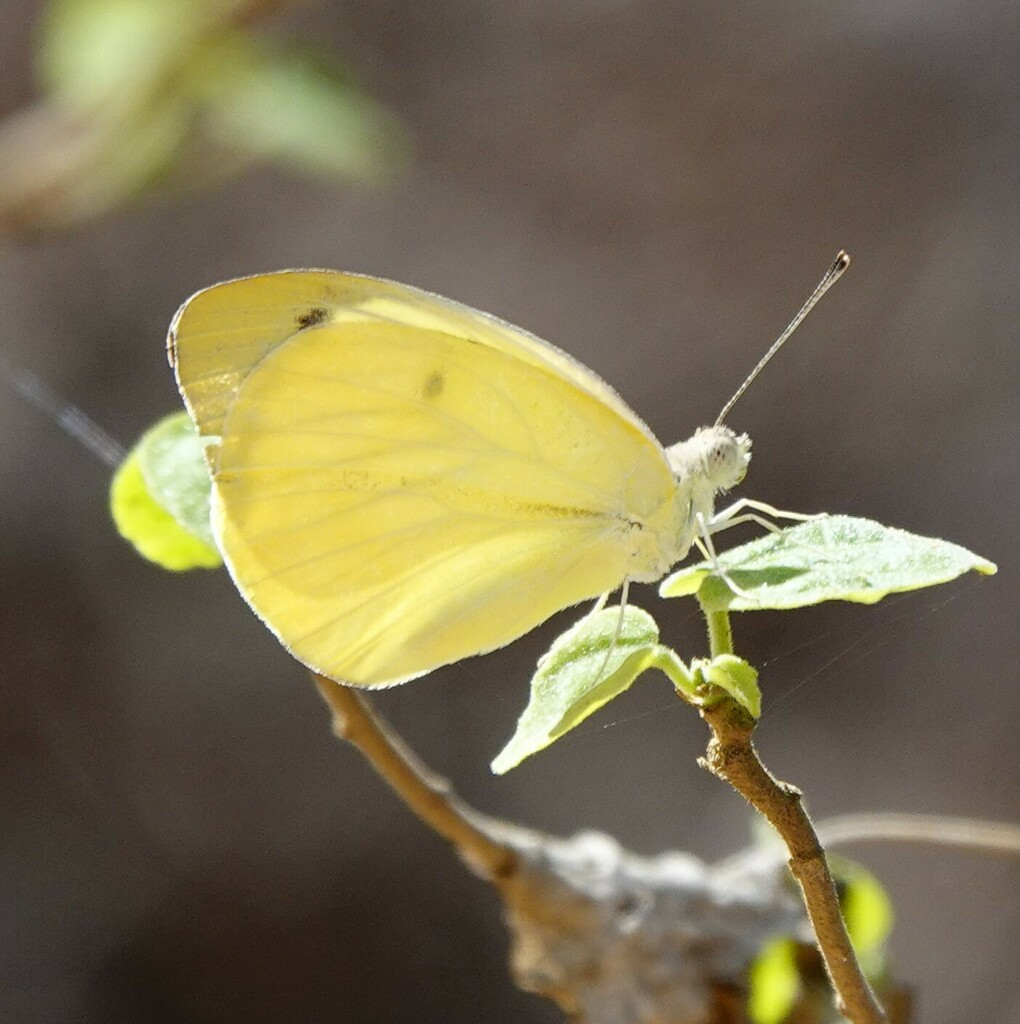

Scientific classification
- Kingdom: Animalia
- Phylum: Arthropoda
- Class: Insecta
- Order: Lepidoptera
- Family: Pieridae
- Genus: Colotis
- Species: C. lucasi

Binomial name
- Colotis lucasi (Grandidier, 1867)

Synonyms
- Callidryas lucasi Grandidier, 1867; Colotis (Gideona) lucasi; Colotis lucas; Eronia vohemara Ward, 1870; Gideona lucasi f. suffusa Talbot, 1939; Gideona lucasi f. deflava Talbot, 1939; Gideona lucasi f. lineata Talbot, 1939

= Colotis lucasi =

Species of butterfly

Colotis lucasi, the giant orange-tip, is a butterfly in the family Pieridae. It is found on Madagascar. The habitat consists of forests, forest margins and unnatural grasslands.
