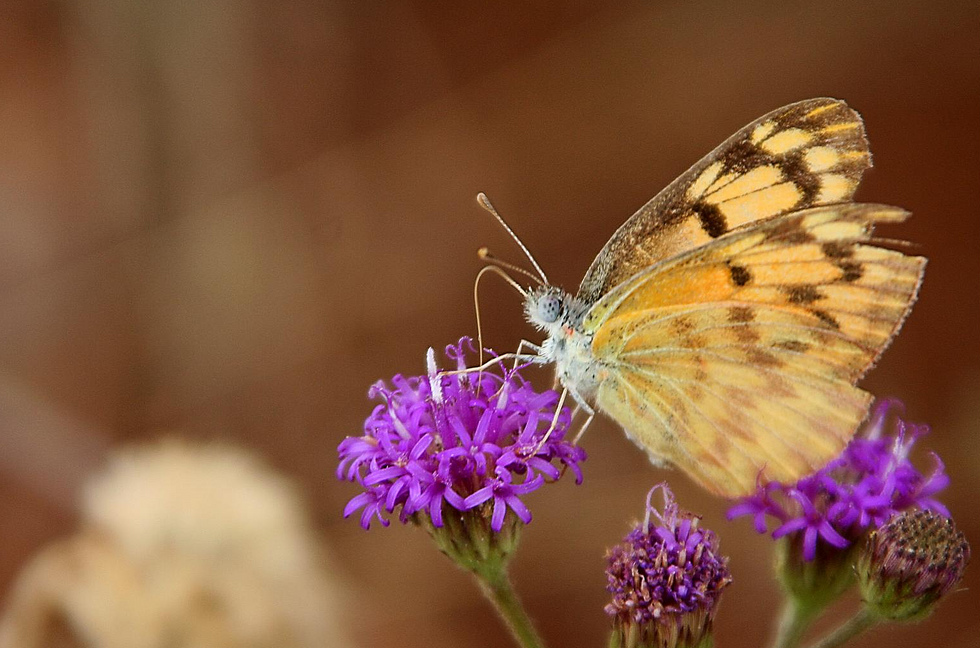

Scientific classification
- Kingdom: Animalia
- Phylum: Arthropoda
- Class: Insecta
- Order: Lepidoptera
- Family: Pieridae
- Genus: Colotis
- Species: C. aurigineus

Binomial name
- Colotis aurigineus (Butler, 1883)

Synonyms
- Teracolus aurigineus Butler, 1883; Colotis (Colotis) aurigineus; Colotis auriginea; Teracolus venustus Butler, 1888; Colotis ansorgei Marshall, 1897; Colotis ansorgei f. aurora Stoneham, 1957; Colotis ansorgei f. tithonus Stoneham, 1957

= Colotis aurigineus =

Species of butterfly

Colotis aurigineus, the African golden Arab, veined gold or double-banded orange, is a butterfly of the family Pieridae. It is found in southern Sudan, Kenya, Tanzania, Uganda, northeastern Zaire, Malawi and northwest Zambia.

The larva feeds on Maerua species.
