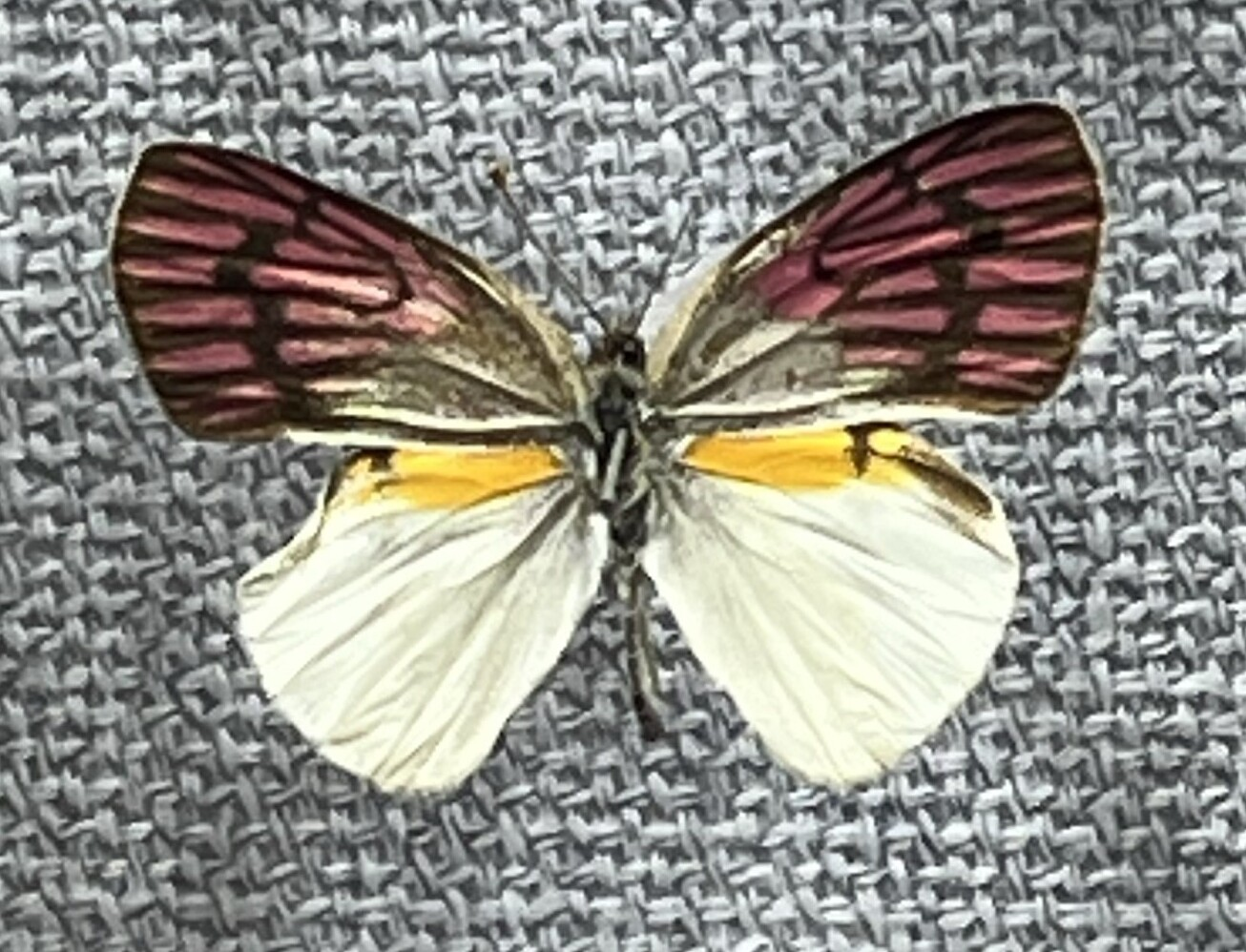

Scientific classification
- Kingdom: Animalia
- Phylum: Arthropoda
- Class: Insecta
- Order: Lepidoptera
- Family: Pieridae
- Genus: Colotis
- Species: C. zoe

Binomial name
- Colotis zoe (Grandidier, 1867)

Synonyms
- Anthocharis zoe Grandidier, 1867; Colotis (Colotis) zoe

= Colotis zoe =

Species of butterfly

Colotis zoe is a butterfly in the family Pieridae. It is found on Madagascar. The habitat consists of forests.
