= Colotis rogersi =

Scientific classification
- Kingdom: Animalia
- Phylum: Arthropoda
- Class: Insecta
- Order: Lepidoptera
- Family: Pieridae
- Genus: Colotis
- Species: C. rogersi

Binomial name
- Colotis rogersi (Dixey, 1915)

Synonyms
- Teracolus rogersi Dixey, 1915; Colotis (Colotis) rogersi

Species of butterfly

Colotis rogersi, the Rogers' orange tip, is a butterfly in the family Pieridae. It is found in northern Kenya, southern Ethiopia and south-eastern Sudan. The habitat consists of very dry savanna.

The larvae feed on Capparis species.
