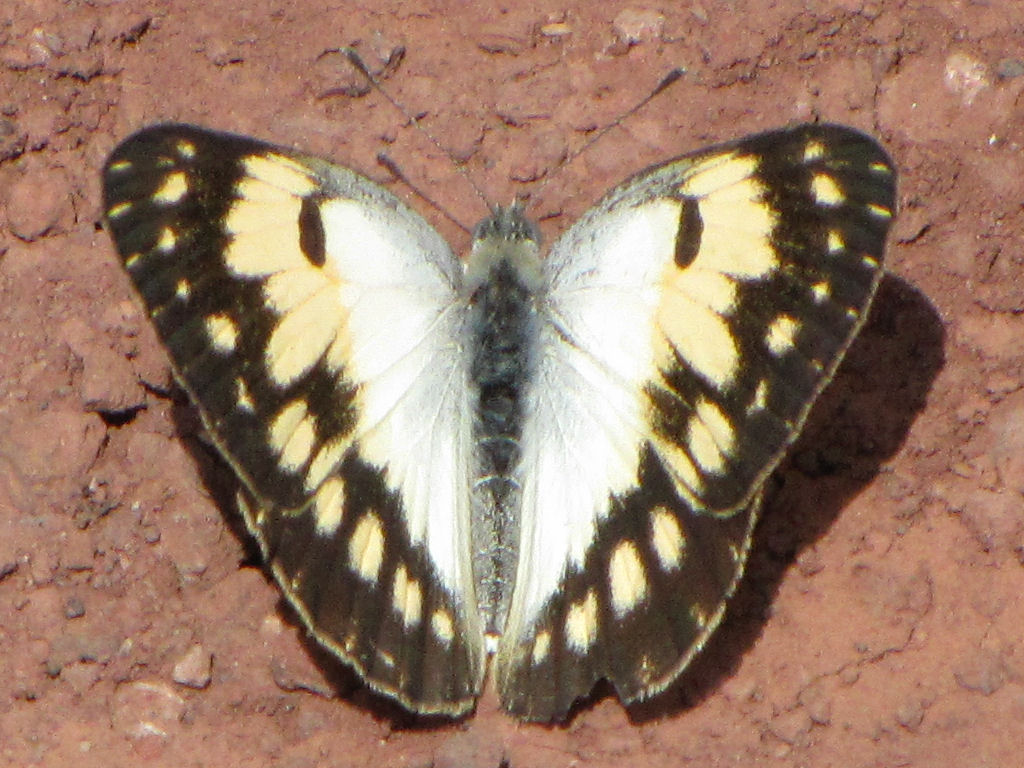
- Lake Manyara National Park, Tanzania
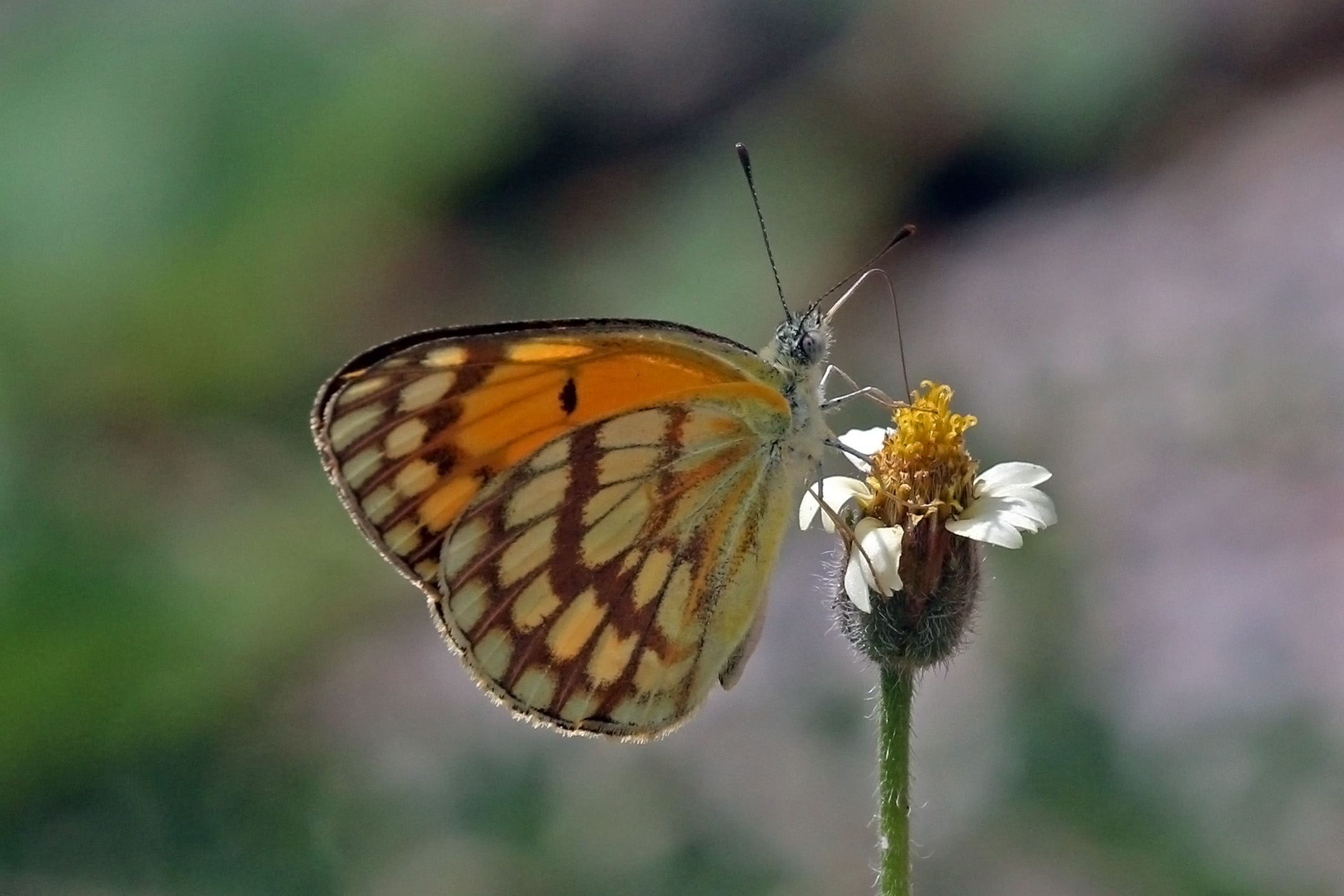
- Veined golden arab, C. v. princeps Queen Elizabeth National Park, Uganda

Scientific classification
- Kingdom: Animalia
- Phylum: Arthropoda
- Clade: Pancrustacea
- Class: Insecta
- Order: Lepidoptera
- Family: Pieridae
- Genus: Colotis
- Species: C. vesta

Binomial name
- Colotis vesta (Reiche, 1849)

Synonyms
- Idmaeus vesta Reiche, 1849; Teracolus vesta Butler, 1897; Colotis vesta vesta f. ops Talbot, 1942; Idmais amelia Lucas, 1852; Teracolus armitagei Dudgeon, 1916; Teracolus amelia f. insignis Rothschild, 1921; Teracolus argillaceus Butler, 1877; Colotis vesta argillaceus f. pluvius Talbot, 1939; Teracolus catachrysops Butler, 1878; Teracolus vesta ab. agapita Hulstaert, 1924; Colotis vesta f. kibwezi Stoneham, 1939; Teracolus hanningtoni Butler, 1883; Teracolus bipartitus Rothschild, 1894; Teracolus amelia hanningtoni f. nigrescens Le Doux, 1929; Colotis vesta f. kitgi Stoneham, 1939; Colotis vesta f. ilia Stoneham, 1957; Teracolus mutans Butler, 1877; Colotis vesta mutans f. arida Talbot, 1939; Teracolus rhodesinus Butler, 1894; Teracolus vesta ab. virescens Hulstaert, 1924; Idmais velleda Lucas, 1852

= Colotis vesta =

Veined tip

Species of butterfly

Colotis vesta, the veined tip, veined orange or veined golden Arab, is a butterfly of the family Pieridae. It is found in the Afrotropical realm.

The wingspan is 32–40 mm (1.3–1.6 in) in males and 34–45 mm (1.3–1.8 in) in females. The adults fly year-round, peaking in late summer and autumn.

The larvae feed on Maerua angolensis.

== Subspecies ==
Listed alphabetically:

- C. v. amelia (Lucas, 1852) (Mauritania, Senegal, Gambia, Mali, Burkina Faso, northern Ghana, northern Nigeria)
- C. v. argillaceus (Butler, 1877) (southern Mozambique, southern Zimbabwe, South Africa, Eswatini)
- C. v. catachrysops (Butler, 1878) (coast of Kenya, coast of Tanzania)
- C. v. hanningtoni (Butler, 1883) (north-eastern Uganda, north-western Kenya, northern Tanzania)
- C. v. kagera Congdon, Kielland & Collins, 1998 (south-western Rwanda, north-western Tanzania)
- C. v. mutans (Butler, 1877) (Zambia, Malawi, northern Mozambique, northern Zimbabwe, northern Botswana, northern Namibia)
- C. v. princeps Talbot, 1939 (south-eastern Sudan, Uganda, Democratic Republic of the Congo)
- C. v. rhodesinus (Butler, 1893) (western Tanzania, Zambia, Democratic Republic of the Congo)
- C. v. velleda (Lucas, 1852) (Sudan)
- C. v. vesta (Reiche, 1849) (Ethiopia, Somalia)

Torben Larsen developed a species numbering system for his 2005 publication Butterflies of West Africa. The subspecies amelia is #54. The 'Larsen' numbers have since been used with permission in A Sharp Eye on Butterflies of Ghana.

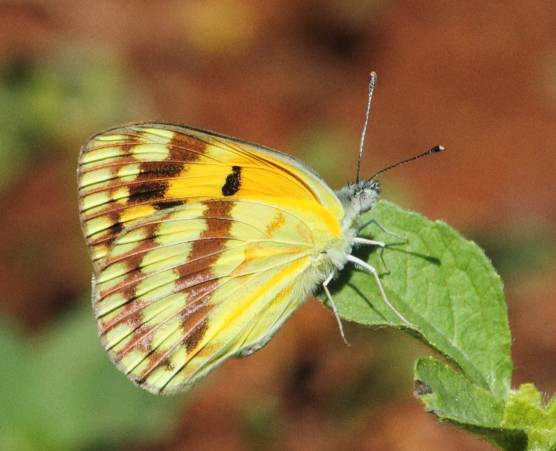
C. v. argillaceus
Ithala Game Reserve, South Africa

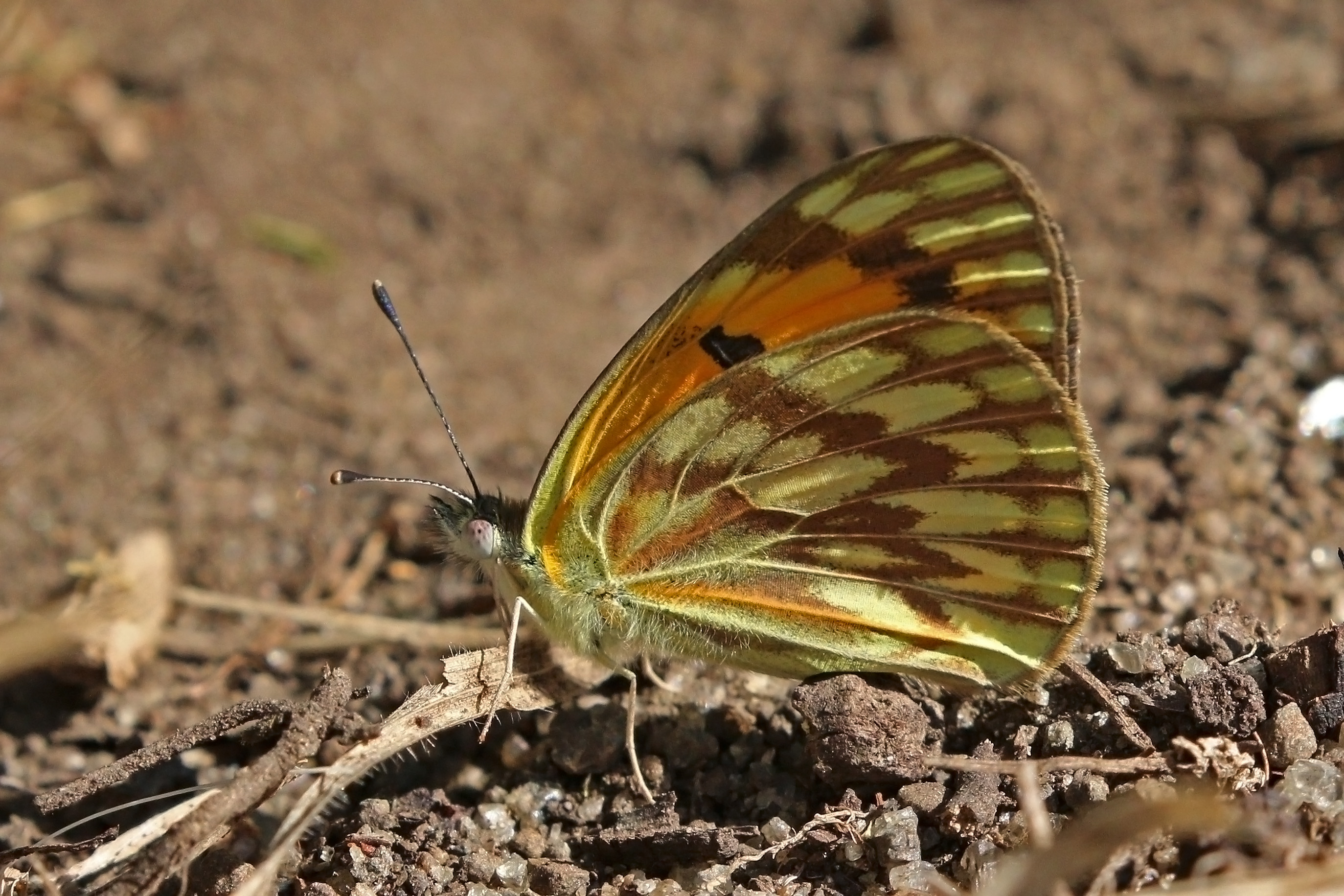
C. v. hanningtoni
Soysambu Conservancy, Kenya
