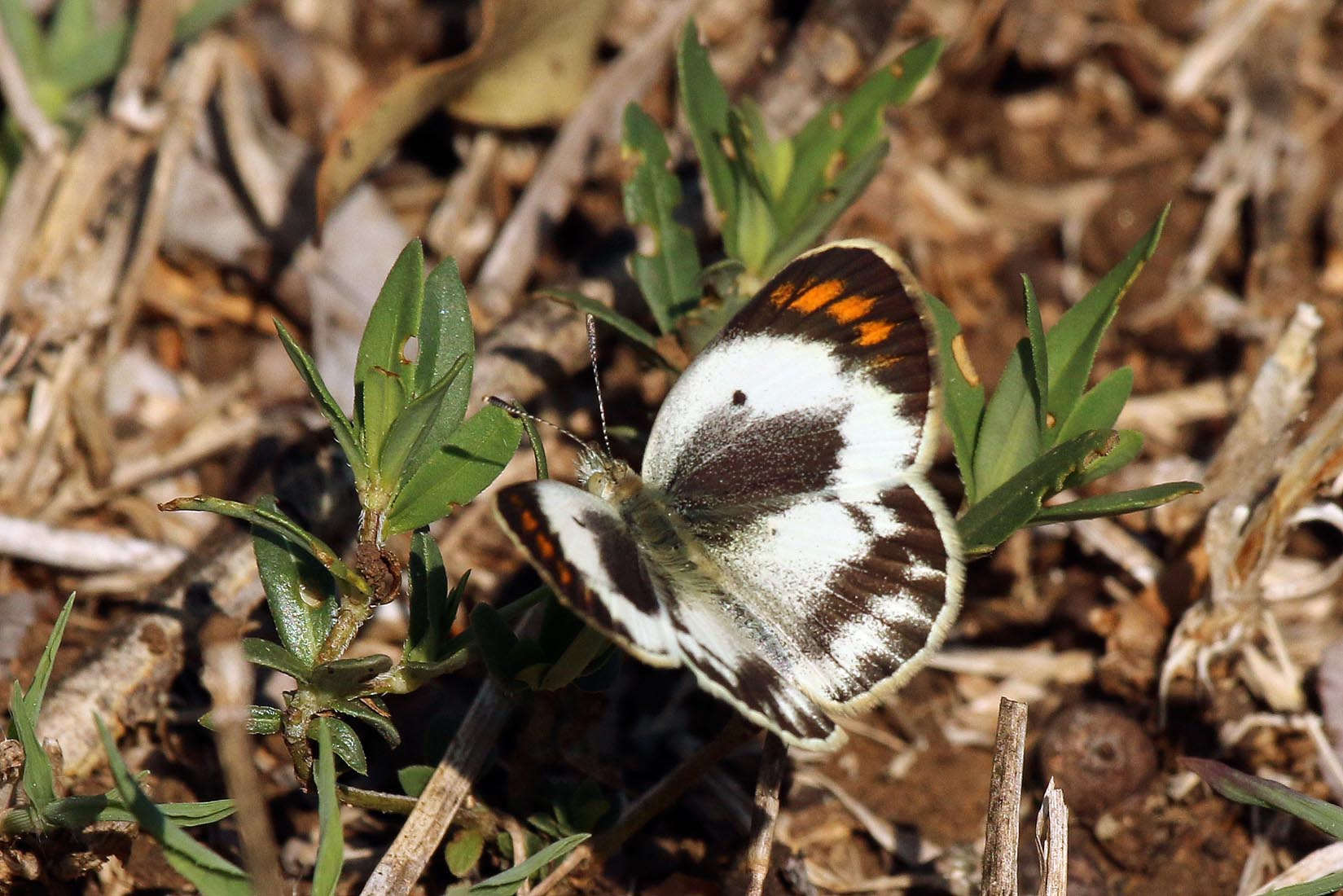
- Female, uMkhuze Game Reserve, KwaZulu-Natal, South Africa

Scientific classification
- Kingdom: Animalia
- Phylum: Arthropoda
- Class: Insecta
- Order: Lepidoptera
- Family: Pieridae
- Genus: Colotis
- Species: C. pallene

Binomial name
- Colotis pallene (Hopffer, 1855)

Synonyms
- Anthocharis pallene Hopffer, 1855; Teracolus halyattes Butler, 1876; Callosune pseudetrida; Teracolus cinctus Butler, 1883; Teracolus infumatus Butler, 1896; Teracolus wissmanni Suffert, 1904; Teracolus infumatus var. seineri Strand, 1909; Teracolus pallene f. achinoides Le Doux, 1929; Teracolus pallene f. meinickei Le Doux, 1929; Teracolus pallene f. pallida Le Doux, 1929; Teracolus pallene f. simplicoides Le Doux, 1929; Colotis pallene f. absurda van Son, 1949

= Colotis pallene =

Bushveld orange tip

Species of butterfly

Colotis pallene, also known as the Bushveld orange tip, is a butterfly of the family Pieridae found in southern Africa.

The wingspan is 28–35 mm. The adults fly year-round, peaking in late summer and autumn.

The larvae feed on Capparis species.
