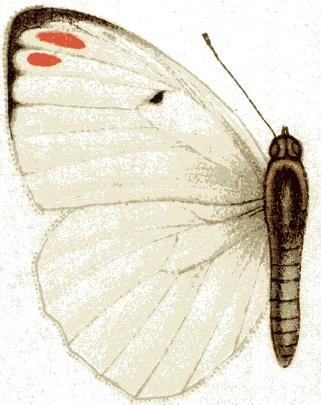

Scientific classification
- Kingdom: Animalia
- Phylum: Arthropoda
- Class: Insecta
- Order: Lepidoptera
- Family: Pieridae
- Genus: Colotis
- Species: C. eunoma

Binomial name
- Colotis eunoma (Hopffer, 1855)

Subspecies
- C. e. eunoma; C. e. flotowi (Suffert, 1904)

Synonyms
- Pieris eunoma; Teracolus chromiferus Butler, 1897; Teracolus eunoma Butler, 1897; Colotis (Colotis) eunoma; Colotis eunoma f. cooksoni van Son, 1956; Teracolus flotowi Suffert, 1904

= Colotis eunoma =

Three spot crimson tip

Species of butterfly

Colotis eunoma, the three spot crimson tip, is a butterfly in the family Pieridae. It is found in Mozambique, Tanzania, and Kenya. The habitat consists of coastal dune scrubs.

Adults are probably on wing year round.

== Subspecies ==
- Colotis eunoma eunoma (Mozambique)
- Colotis eunoma flotowi (Suffert, 1904) (Tanzania, Kenya)
