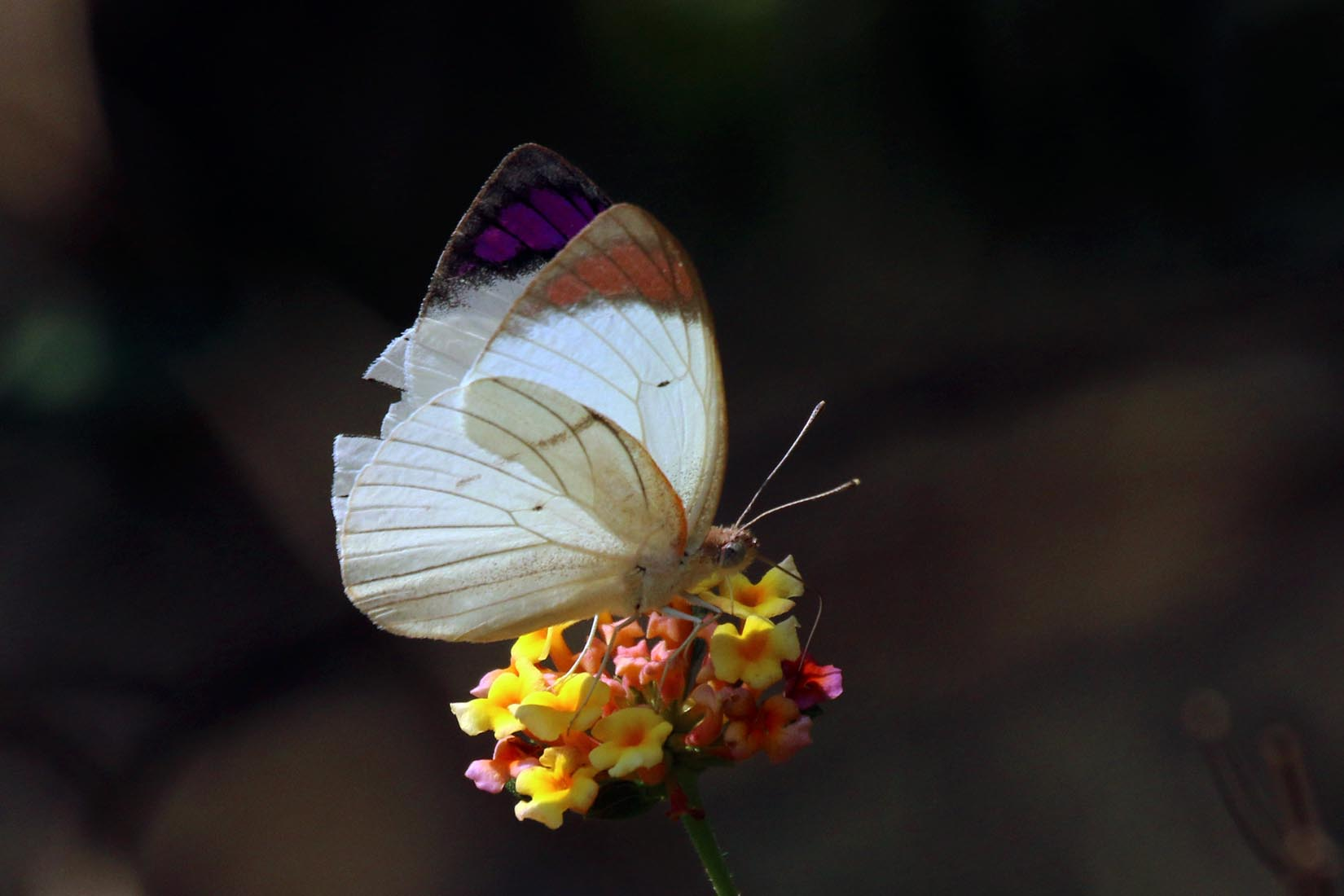
- At uMkhuze Game Reserve, KwaZulu-Natal, South Africa

Scientific classification
- Kingdom: Animalia
- Phylum: Arthropoda
- Class: Insecta
- Order: Lepidoptera
- Family: Pieridae
- Genus: Colotis
- Species: C. regina

Binomial name
- Colotis regina (Trimen, 1863)

Synonyms
- Anthocharis regina Trimen, 1863; Colotis (Colotis) regina; Teracolus regina louisa Suffert, 1904; Teracolus regina ab. flavimacula Aurivillius, 1910

= Colotis regina =

Queen purple tip

Species of butterfly

Colotis regina, the queen purple tip, regal purple tip, or large violet tip, is a butterfly of the family Pieridae. It is found in the Afrotropical realm.

== Description ==
The wingspan is 45–62 mm. The adults fly year-round.

These butterflies are noted much rarely than other Colotis species, but recorded regularly in February and March.

== Habitat and behavior ==
The larvae feed on Boscia and Capparis species.
