= Colotis evanthides =

Scientific classification
- Kingdom: Animalia
- Phylum: Arthropoda
- Class: Insecta
- Order: Lepidoptera
- Family: Pieridae
- Genus: Colotis
- Species: C. evanthides

Binomial name
- Colotis evanthides (Holland, 1896)

Synonyms
- Callosune evanthides Holland, 1896; Colotis (Colotis) evanthides

Species of butterfly

Colotis evanthides is a butterfly in the family Pieridae. It is found on the Comoros and Seychelles.
