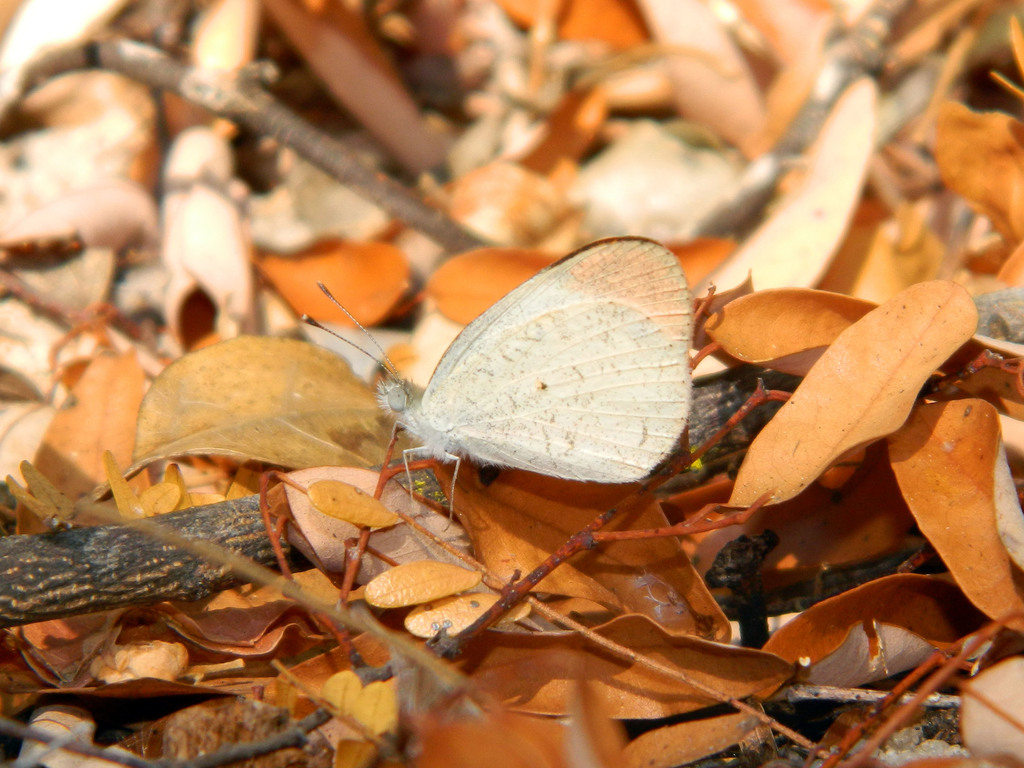

Scientific classification
- Kingdom: Animalia
- Phylum: Arthropoda
- Class: Insecta
- Order: Lepidoptera
- Family: Pieridae
- Genus: Colotis
- Species: C. evanthe

Binomial name
- Colotis evanthe (Boisduval, 1836)

Synonyms
- Anthocharis evanthe Boisduval, 1836; Colotis (Colotis) evanthe; Anthocharis ena Mabille, 1879; Calicharis evanthe var. lecithosoides Oberthür, 1920; Colotis evanthe ab. joannisi Dufrane, 1947; Colotis evanthe ab. drueti Dufrane, 1947

= Colotis evanthe =

Species of butterfly

Colotis evanthe is a butterfly in the family Pieridae. It is found on Madagascar and the Comoros. The habitat consists of forests, forest margins and unnatural grasslands.
