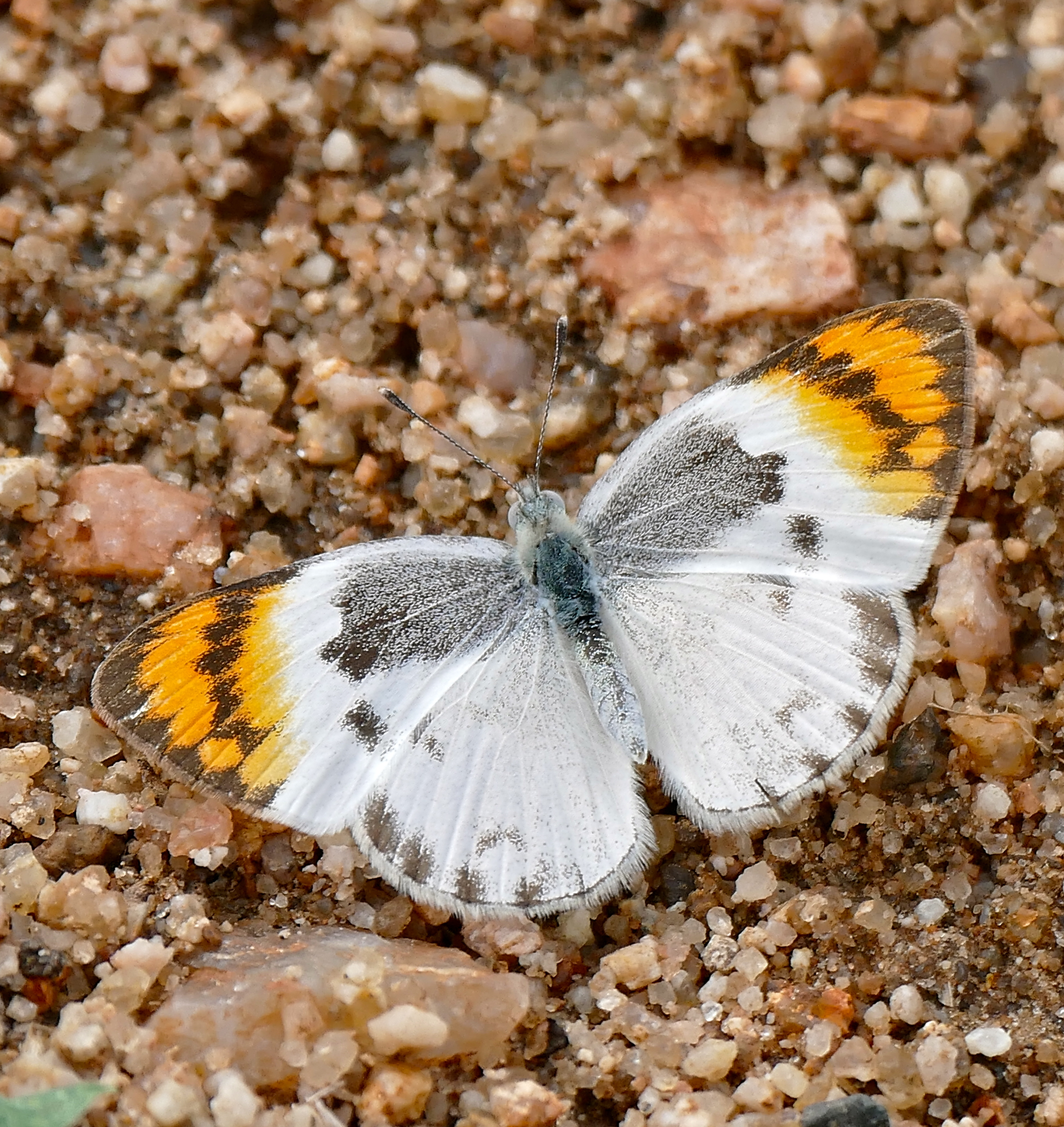
- A female of the nominate race and dry season form in the Kruger National Park

Scientific classification
- Kingdom: Animalia
- Phylum: Arthropoda
- Class: Insecta
- Order: Lepidoptera
- Family: Pieridae
- Genus: Colotis
- Species: C. evenina

Binomial name
- Colotis evenina (Wallengren, 1857)

Synonyms
- Anthopsyche evenina Wallengren, 1857; Colotis (Colotis) evenina; Anthopsyche deidamia Wallengren, 1860; Calosune deidamioides Aurivillius, 1879; Callosune inornata Westwood, 1881; Teracolus corda Möschler, 1884; Teracolus evenina Butler, 1897; Colotis evenina f. lerichei van Son, 1959; Callosune casta Gerstaecker, 1871; Teracolus evenina var. sypilus ab. flavofasciata Neustetter, 1916; Teracolus liagore f. castina Le Cerf, 1924; Colotis evenina sipylus f. granti Talbot, 1939; Colotis evenina sipylus f. johnstonei Talbot, 1939; Colotis evenina sipylus f. canus Talbot, 1939; Colotis evenina sipylus f. andromorpha Talbot, 1942; Teracolus sipylus Swinhoe, 1884; Colotis antevippe ab. mathieui Dufrane, 1947; Teracolus confusus Le Doux, 1929; Colotis evenina xantholeuca f. ledouxi Talbot, 1939

= Colotis evenina =

Common orange tip

Species of butterfly

Colotis evenina, the common orange tip, is a butterfly of the family Pieridae. It is found in the Afrotropical realm.

== Description and habits ==
The wingspan is 38–45 mm in males and 35–42 mm in females. The adults fly year-round.

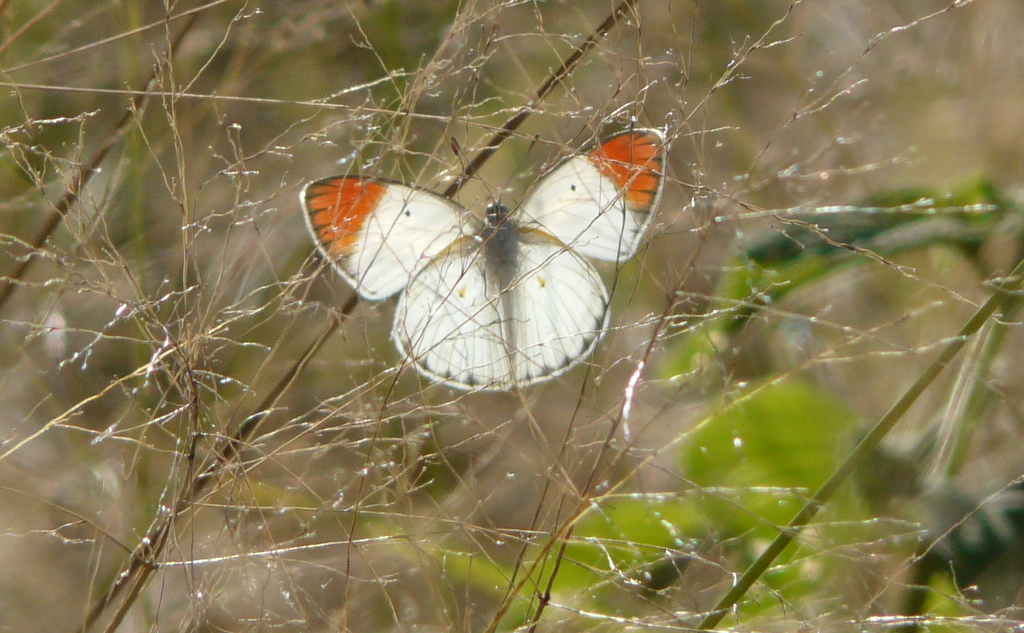
C. evenina lacks discocellular dots as seen here in C. antevippe, besides any dark venation.

The larvae feed on Boscia albitrunca and Capparis species.

== Subspecies ==
The following subspecies are recognised:

- C. e. evenina — Mozambique, southern and eastern Zimbabwe, Botswana, Namibia, South Africa, Eswatini, Lesotho
- C. e. sipylus (Swinhoe, 1884) — coast of Kenya, Tanzania, northern Zimbabwe
- C. e. xantholeuca (Sharpe, 1904) — southern Uganda, central and south-western Kenya, central, northern and western Tanzania
- C. e. casta (Gerstaecker, 1871) — northern Zimbabwe, Zambia, Democratic Republic of the Congo, Mozambique, Malawi, Tanzania, northern Kenya, Ethiopia, Somalia
