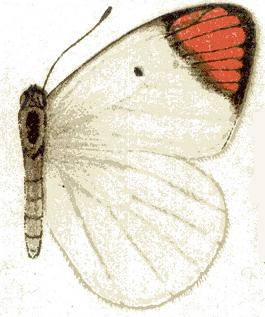

Scientific classification
- Kingdom: Animalia
- Phylum: Arthropoda
- Clade: Pancrustacea
- Class: Insecta
- Order: Lepidoptera
- Family: Pieridae
- Genus: Colotis
- Species: C. guenei

Binomial name
- Colotis guenei (Mabille, 1877)

Synonyms
- Anthocharis guenei Mabille, 1877; Colotis (Colotis) guenei; Anthocharis siga Mabille, 1882

= Colotis guenei =

Species of butterfly

Colotis guenei is a species of butterfly in the family Pieridae. It is found on Madagascar. The habitat consists of forests.
