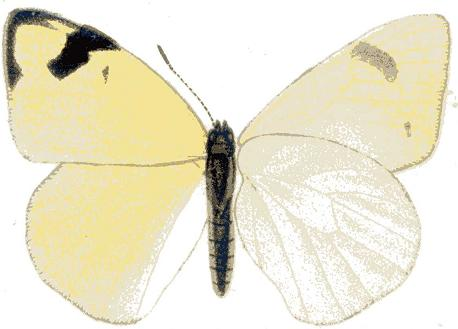
- Male
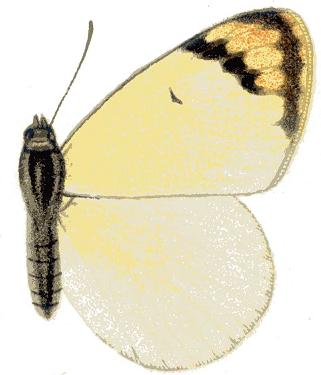
- Female

Scientific classification
- Kingdom: Animalia
- Phylum: Arthropoda
- Clade: Pancrustacea
- Class: Insecta
- Order: Lepidoptera
- Family: Pieridae
- Genus: Colotis
- Species: C. subfasciatus

Binomial name
- Colotis subfasciatus (Swainson, 1822)

Synonyms
- Teracolus subfasciatus Swainson, 1822; Colotis (Teracolus) subfasciatus; Ptychopteryx bohemanni Wallengren, 1857; Teracolus ganymedes Trautmann, 1927; Ptychopteryx ducissa Dognin, 1891; Teracolus sulfuratus Karsch, 1898; Colotis vreuricki Dufrane, 1947

= Colotis subfasciatus =

Lemon tip

Species of butterfly

Colotis subfasciatus, the lemon tip or lemon traveller, is a butterfly of the family Pieridae. It is found in the Afrotropical realm. The habitat consists of savannah and Brachystegia woodland.

The wingspan is 45–52 mm in males and 48–55 mm in females. There are distinct seasonal forms. The adults fly year-round in warm areas, peaking from March to June.

The larvae feed on Boscia albitrunca.

== Subspecies ==
The following subspecies are recognised:

- C. e. subfasciatus (southern Mozambique, Zimbabwe, Botswana, Namibia, South Africa, Eswatini)
- C. s. ducissa (Dognin, 1891) (central and western Tanzania, Democratic Republic of the Congo, Malawi, Zambia)
