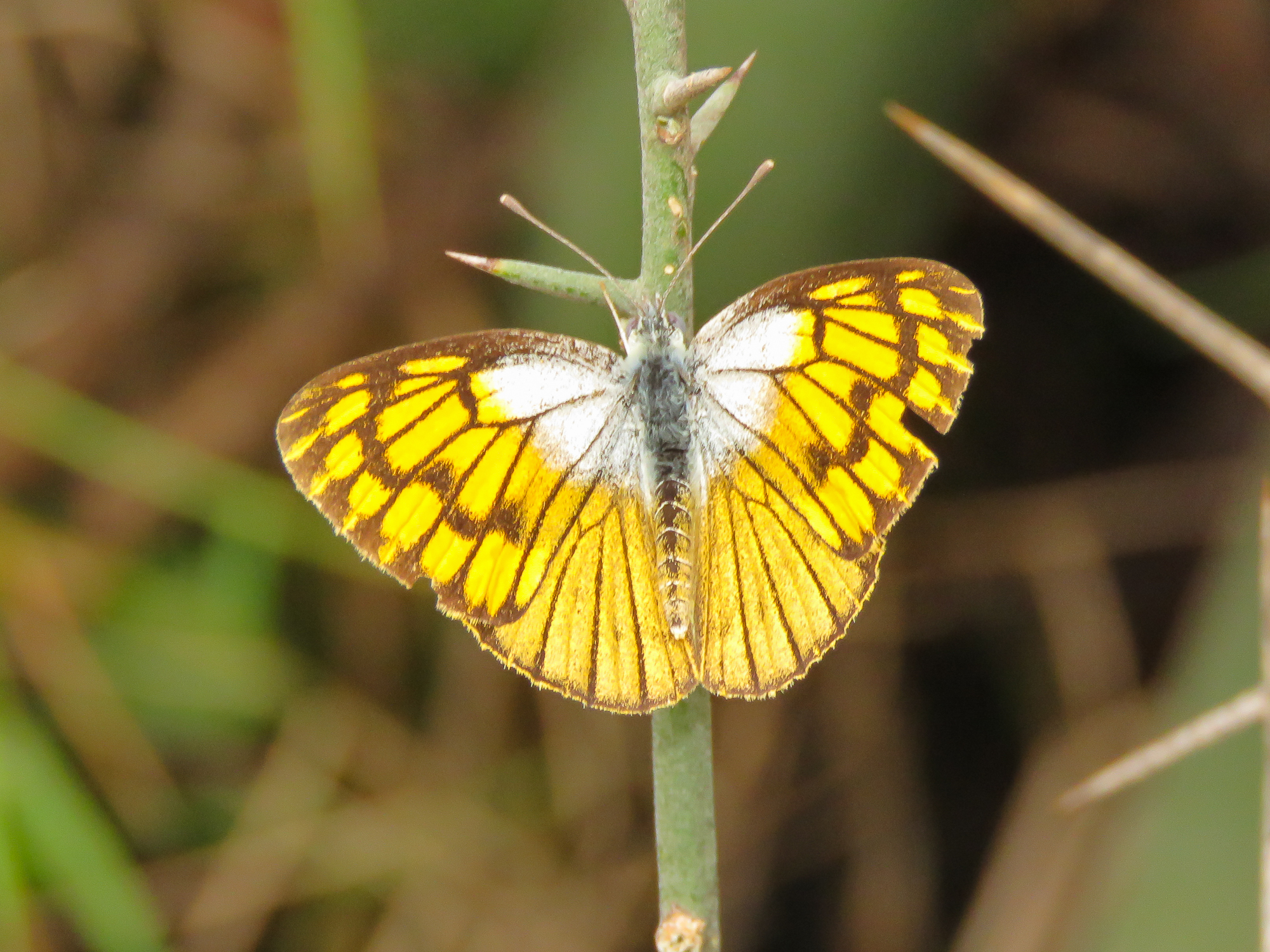

Scientific classification
- Kingdom: Animalia
- Phylum: Arthropoda
- Class: Insecta
- Order: Lepidoptera
- Family: Pieridae
- Genus: Colotis
- Species: C. chrysonome

Binomial name
- Colotis chrysonome (Klug, 1829)

Synonyms
- Pontia chrysonome Klug, 1829; Colotis (Colotis) chrysonome; Teracolus gaudens Butler, 1876; Teracolus arenicolens Butler, 1884; Teracolus helvolus Butler, 1888; Teracolus cosmas Hulstaert, 1924; Teracolus chrysonome meinertzhageni Riley, 1934; Teracolus chrysonome socnensis Krüger, 1939; Colotis chrysonome patrizii Storace, 1949

= Colotis chrysonome =

Species of butterfly

Colotis chrysonome, the golden Arab tip, is a butterfly in the family Pieridae. It is found in the Mauritania, northern Senegal, Mali, Burkina Faso, Nigeria, Niger, the central and eastern part of the Sahara, Sudan, Ethiopia, Somalia, southern Arabia, northern Uganda, Kenya, northern Tanzania, Israel and Jordan. The habitat consists of arid savanna.

The wingspan is 33–38 mm.

The larvae feed on Maerua species.
