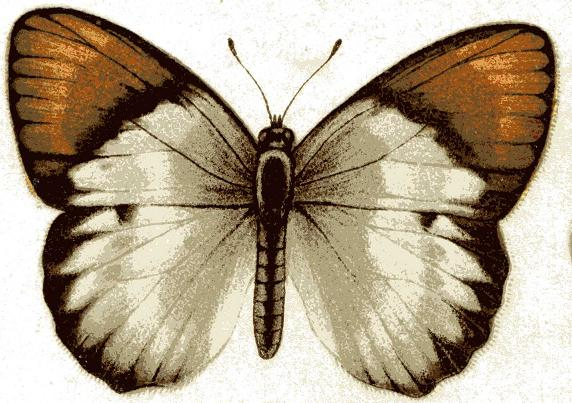

Scientific classification
- Kingdom: Animalia
- Phylum: Arthropoda
- Clade: Pancrustacea
- Class: Insecta
- Order: Lepidoptera
- Family: Pieridae
- Genus: Colotis
- Species: C. hildebrandtii

Binomial name
- Colotis hildebrandtii (Staudinger, 1884)

Synonyms
- Callosune hildebrandtii Staudinger, 1884; Colotis hildebrandti; Colotis (Colotis) hildebrandtii; Teracolus callidia Grose-Smith, 1886; Teracolus hildebrandtii clara Suffert, 1904; Teracolus hildebrandtii blanca Suffert, 1904; Teracolus lanzi Bartel, 1905; Teracolus hildebrandtii ab. intermedia Neustetter, 1916; Colotis hildebrandtii f. bicolor Talbot, 1939

= Colotis hildebrandtii =

Species of butterfly

Colotis hildebrandtii, the golden tip, is a butterfly in the family Pieridae. It is found in northern Zambia, Malawi, Tanzania and central and southern Kenya. The habitat consists of dense savanna and Acacia woodland.

Adults have a light and dancing, fast flight.

The larvae feed on Cadaba species.
