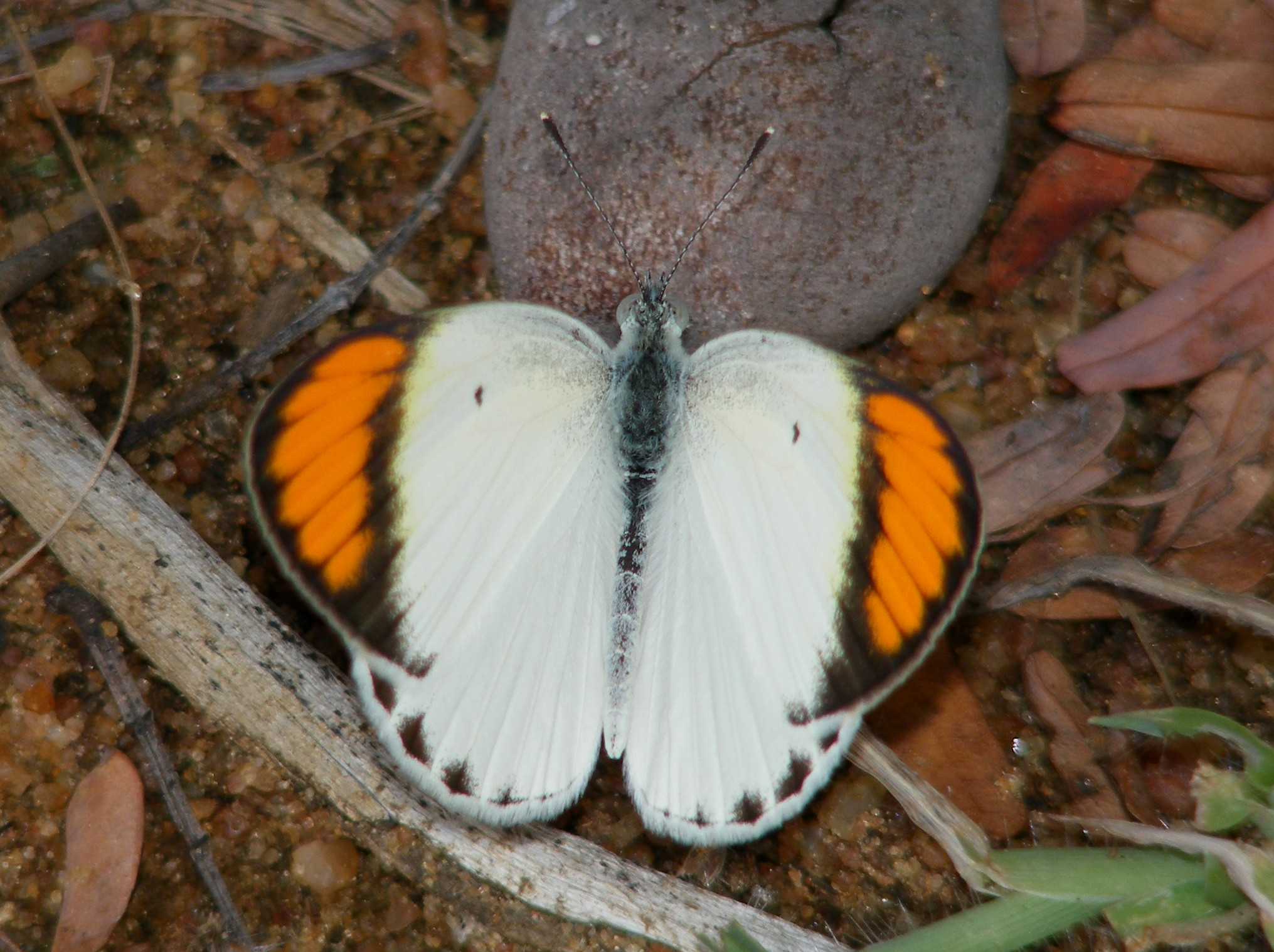

Scientific classification
- Domain: Eukaryota
- Kingdom: Animalia
- Phylum: Arthropoda
- Class: Insecta
- Order: Lepidoptera
- Family: Pieridae
- Genus: Colotis
- Species: C. etrida

Binomial name
- Colotis etrida (Boisduval, 1836)

Synonyms
- Anthocharis etrida Boisduval, 1836; Teracolus pernotatus Butler, 1876; Teracolus farrinus Butler, 1876; Teracolus purus Butler, 1876; Teracolus casimirus Butler, 1876; Teracolus bimbura Butler, 1876

= Colotis etrida =

Species of butterfly

Colotis etrida, the little orange tip, is a species of butterfly in the family Pieridae. It is native to India, Sri Lanka and Pakistan.

== Description ==
The ground colour on the upperside of the males is white, sparsely irrorated (speckled) at base of forewings and hindwings with black scales. The forewing has a small black spot on the discocellulars; apex broadly black, with an enclosed oval, curved, rich orange patch placed obliquely and traversed by the veins, which there are black; inner edge of black area diffuse. Hindwing is uniform, except for a preapical short diffuse black streak from the costa, sometimes absent, and a series of terminal black spots that in specimens from moist localities are very large. Underside is white with the cell and apex of forewing suffused with sulphur yellow, the orange patch of the upperside shows through by transparency, its inner edge margined anteriorly by a very obscure oblique fuscous band. Hindwing has the preapical short transverse black streak on the upperside obscurely indicated.

The female is very similar to the male but can be distinguished as follows: Upperside of the forewing has a narrower orange patch enclosed within the black apical area; a small black spot in middle of interspace 1 and another in interspace 3. Hindwing has the terminal spots slightly larger. On the underside the apex of forewing and whole surface of hindwing suffused lightly, or in specimens from very dry localities heavily, with ochraceous. Forewing has spots in interspaces 1 and 3 as on the upperside. Hindwing: a curved, almost complete, discal series of fuscous spots; otherwise as in the male.

In both sexes the antennae vary from white to pale brownish; head, thorax and abdomen black, the head and thorax with short greyish-brown hairs; beneath: the palpi, thorax and abdomen white.

== Range ==
It is found from the outer ranges of the Himalayas throughout peninsular India except Bengal.

Subspecies C. e. limbata is found in Sri Lanka. and it has the black apical area on the forewing darker, broader, occupying about a third of the wing; the orange patch enclosed within it is proportionately narrower, so that the black on its inner margin has the appearance of being broader proportionately than it is in the typical form. Very often this inner edge is bordered by a suffusion of sulphur yellow. Specimens from south Indian hills resemble this closely.

=== Larva ===
The larva is narrow and uniformly green with a yellow, white, or pink-tinged line along each side.

=== Pupa ===
The pupa is compressed with a long, upturned end. It is green when new, turning a brown-mottled grey.

== Biology ==
The food plants of this species include the toothbrush tree (Salvadora persica), pilu (Salvadora oleoides), and Indian cadaba (Cadaba indica).

== Subspecies ==
- Colotis etrida etrida (India)
- Colotis etrida limbata Butler, 1876 (Sri Lanka)

== Gallery ==
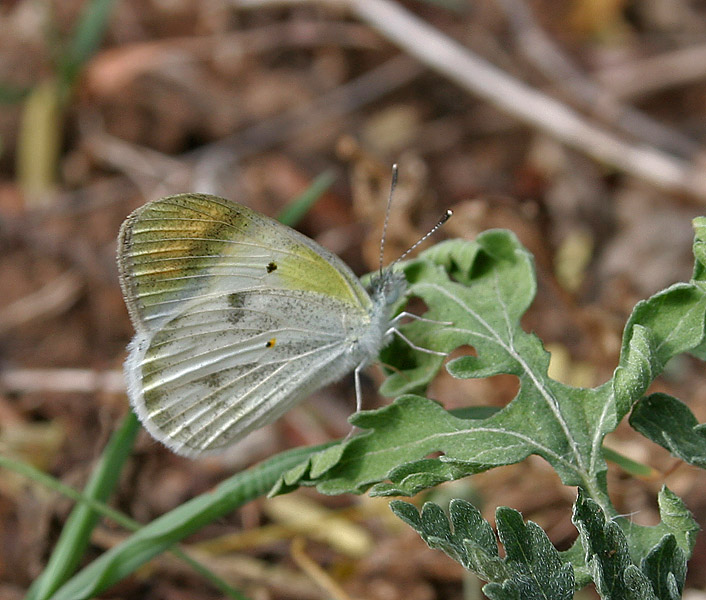
Male underside

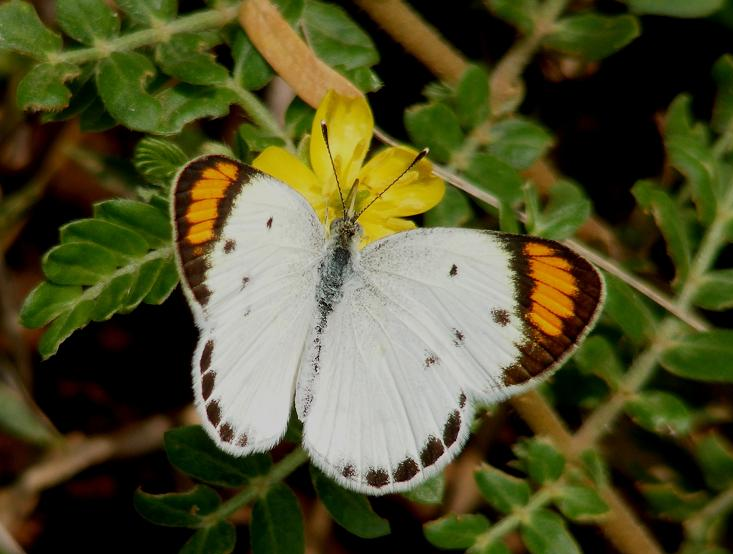
Female upperside

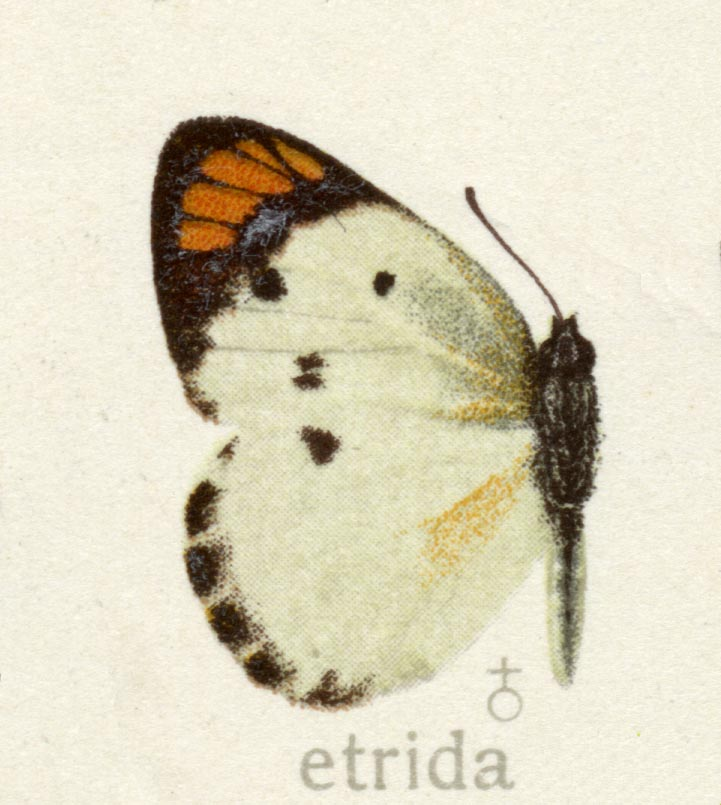

== See also ==
- List of butterflies of India (Pieridae)
