= Colotis ephyia =

Scientific classification
- Kingdom: Animalia
- Phylum: Arthropoda
- Class: Insecta
- Order: Lepidoptera
- Family: Pieridae
- Genus: Colotis
- Species: C. ephyia

Binomial name
- Colotis ephyia (Klug, 1829)

Synonyms
- Pontia ephyia Klug, 1829; Colotis (Colotis) ephyia

Species of butterfly

Colotis ephyia is a butterfly in the family Pieridae. It is found in Chad, Sudan, south-western Saudi Arabia and Yemen.
