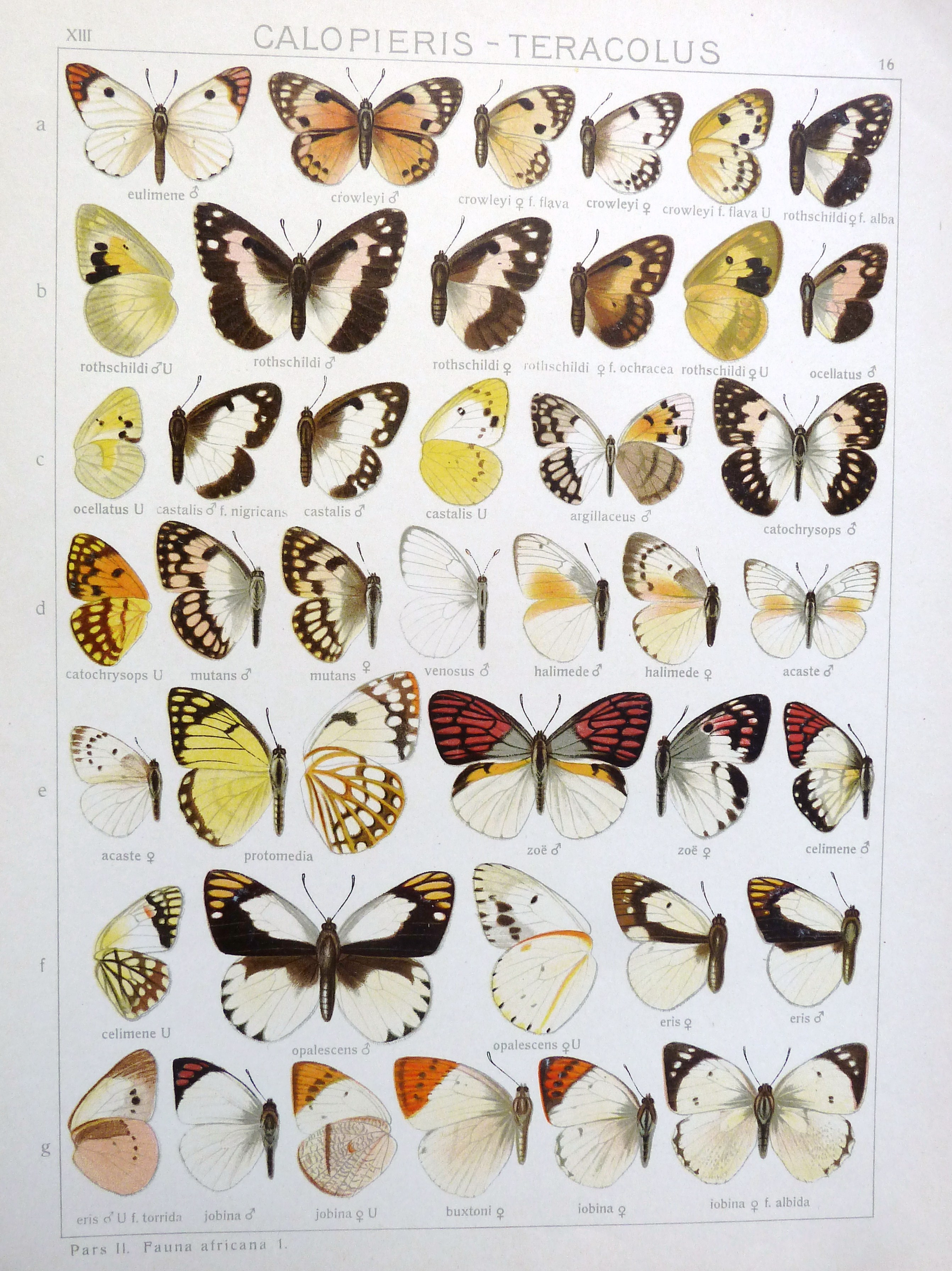

Scientific classification
- Kingdom: Animalia
- Phylum: Arthropoda
- Class: Insecta
- Order: Lepidoptera
- Family: Pieridae
- Genus: Colotis
- Species: C. protomedia

Binomial name
- Colotis protomedia (Klug, 1829)

Synonyms
- Pontia protomedia Klug, 1829; Colotis (Colotis) protomedia; Colotis protomedia f. microps Storace, 1956

= Colotis protomedia =

Species of butterfly

Colotis protomedia, the yellow splendour tip, is a butterfly in the family Pieridae. It is found in north-eastern Nigeria, northern Cameroon, Chad, southern Sudan, northern Uganda, Ethiopia, Somaliland, south-western Saudi Arabia, Yemen, Somalia, Kenya, Tanzania and the Democratic Republic of the Congo. The habitat consists of dry savannah.

Adults have a fast flight. They are attracted to flowers, especially those of Maerua species.

The larvae feed on Maerua species.
