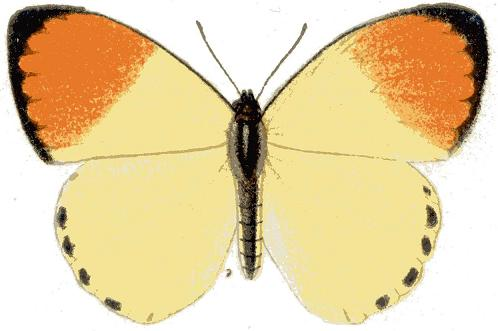
- Male
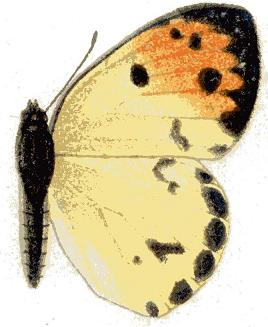
- Female

Scientific classification
- Kingdom: Animalia
- Phylum: Arthropoda
- Class: Insecta
- Order: Lepidoptera
- Family: Pieridae
- Genus: Colotis
- Species: C. incretus

Binomial name
- Colotis incretus (Butler, 1881)

Synonyms
- Teracolus incretus Butler, 1881; Colotis (Colotis) incretus; Teracolus incretus ab. panganiensis Thurau, 1904; Colotis auxo incretus f. delens Hecq, 1975

= Colotis incretus =

Species of butterfly

Colotis incretus, the yellow orange tip, is a butterfly in the family Pieridae. It is found in southern Kenya, Burundi, Tanzania and Zambia. The habitat consists of moist savanna.

The larvae feed on Capparis, Salvadora persica and Cadaba species.
