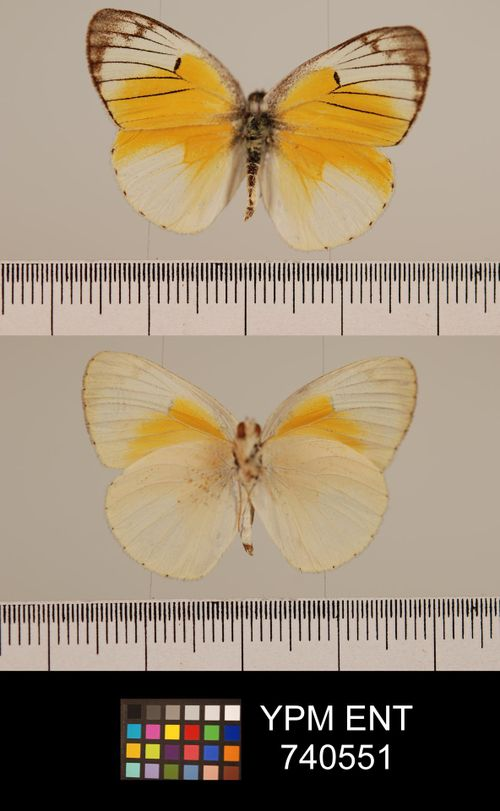

Scientific classification
- Kingdom: Animalia
- Phylum: Arthropoda
- Class: Insecta
- Order: Lepidoptera
- Family: Pieridae
- Genus: Colotis
- Species: C. pleione

Binomial name
- Colotis pleione (Klug, 1829)

Synonyms
- Pontia pleione Klug, 1829; Colotis (Colotis) pleione; Idmais miriam Felder and Felder, 1865; Teracolus chrysomelis Butler, 1874; Idmais eucheria Mabille, 1880; Teracolus pleione ab. tethys Röber, 1907; Teracolus heliocaustus Butler, 1886; Teracolus pleione f. eos Le Cerf, 1924; Colotis pleione antinorii Storace, 1956

= Colotis pleione =

Species of butterfly

Colotis pleione, the orange patch tip, is a butterfly in the family Pieridae. It is found in Arabia, Ethiopia, Somalia, Kenya, Sudan and Chad. The habitat consists of very dry savanna to sub-deserts.

The larvae feed on Capparis, Cadaba and Cleome species.

== Subspecies ==
- Colotis pleione pleione (western and southern Arabia)
- Colotis pleione heliocaustus (Butler, 1886) (Ethiopia, Somalia, northern and north-eastern Kenya)
- Colotis pleione nilus Talbot, 1942 (southern and central Sudan, Chad)
