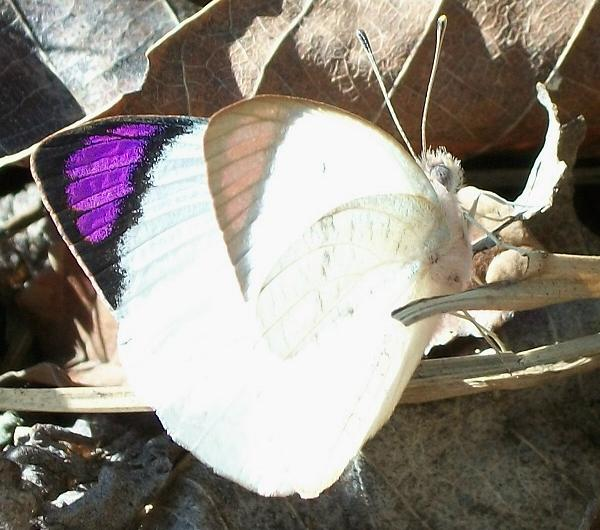
- Male from Amanzimtoti, South Africa
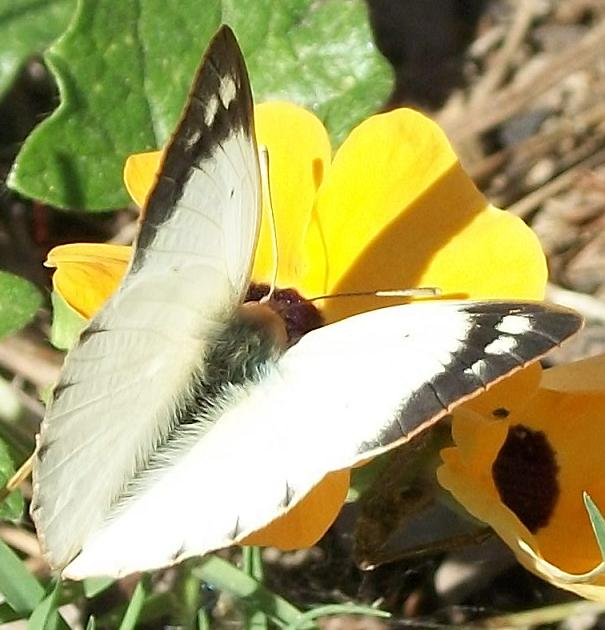
- Female from Amanzimtoti, South Africa

Scientific classification
- Kingdom: Animalia
- Phylum: Arthropoda
- Class: Insecta
- Order: Lepidoptera
- Family: Pieridae
- Genus: Colotis
- Species: C. erone

Binomial name
- Colotis erone (Angas, 1849)

Synonyms
- Anthocharis erone Angas, 1849; Colotis (Colotis) erone; Anthopsyche speciosa Wallengren, 1857; Euchloe jobina Butler, 1869; Teracolus erone ab. albidus Aurivillius, 1910; Colotis erone f. millari van Son, 1949

= Colotis erone =

Coast purple tip

Species of butterfly

Colotis erone, the coast purple tip, is a butterfly of the family Pieridae. It is found in the Afrotropical realm and is endemic to Natal, Pondoland, Eswatini, and Transvaal.

The wingspan is 40–50 mm. The adults fly year-round, peaking from December to January and March to July.

The larvae feed on Maerua racemulosa and Maerua pedunculosa.
