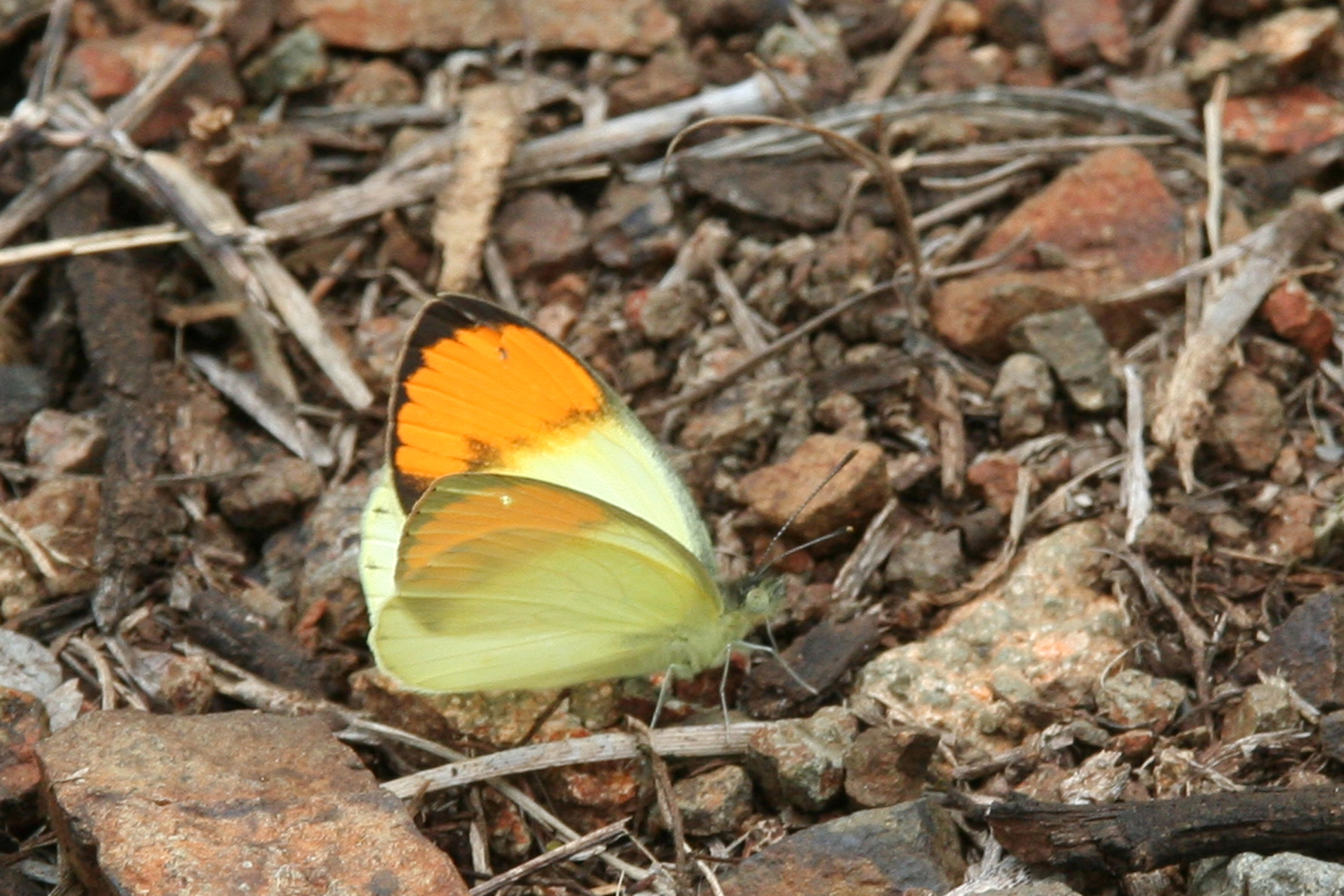

Scientific classification
- Kingdom: Animalia
- Phylum: Arthropoda
- Class: Insecta
- Order: Lepidoptera
- Family: Pieridae
- Genus: Colotis
- Species: C. auxo

Binomial name
- Colotis auxo (H. Lucas, 1852)

Synonyms
- Anthocharis auxo H. Lucas, 1852; Anthopsyche topha Wallengren, 1860; Anthocharis keiskamma Trimen, 1862; Teracolus syrtinus Butler, 1876; Callosune vulnerata Staudinger, 1885; Colotis eucharis f. intensa Stoneham, 1939; Colotis eucharis f. reducta Stoneham, 1939

= Colotis auxo =

Yellow orange tip

Species of butterfly

Colotis auxo, the yellow orange tip or sulphur orange tip, is a butterfly of the family Pieridae. The species was first described by Hippolyte Lucas in 1852. It is found in southern Africa and is named after the Keiskamma River.

The wingspan is 35–40 mm. The adults fly year-round.

The larvae feed on Cadaba species (C. termitario, C. natalensis) and Salvadora species.
