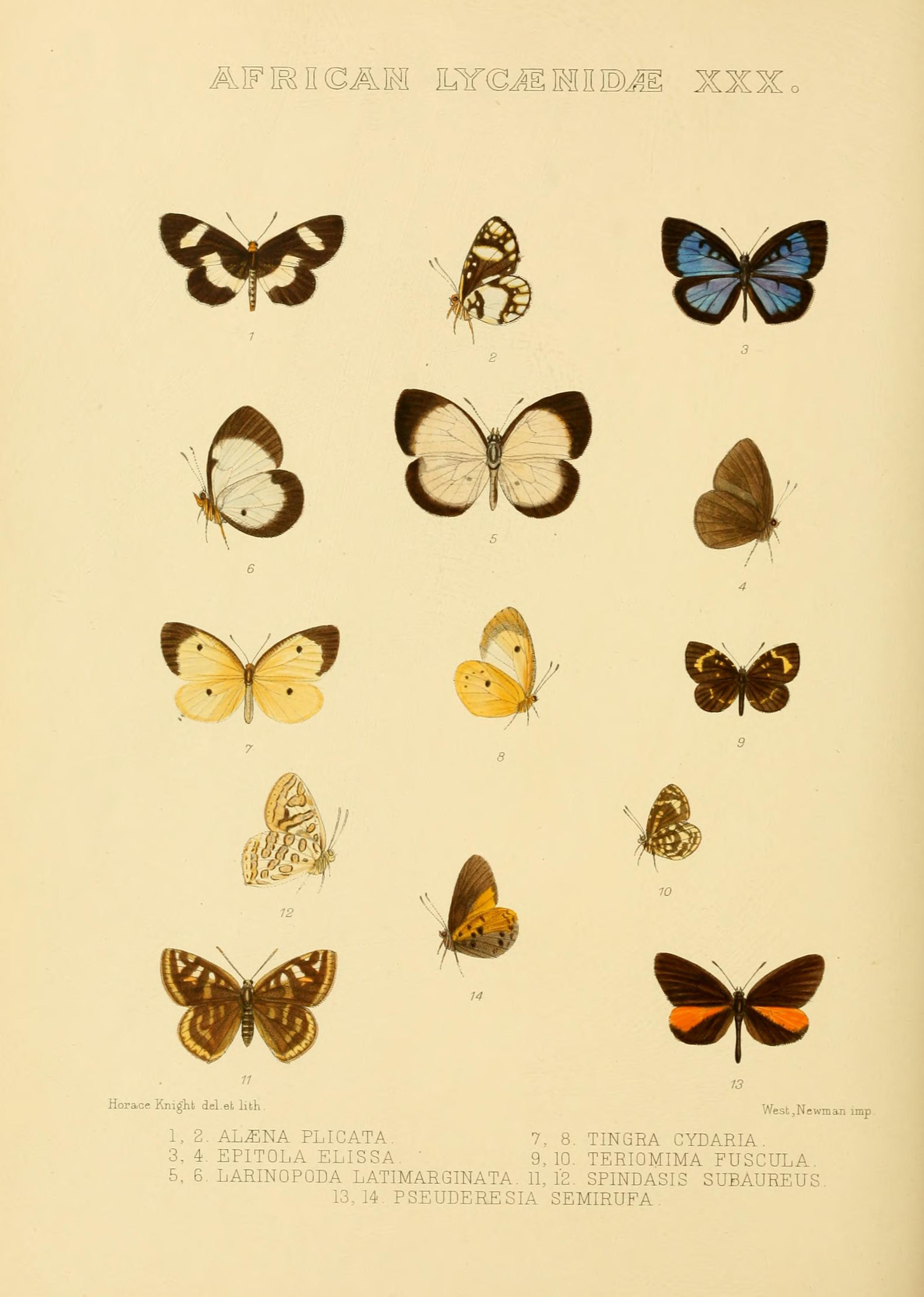
- Figures 11 and 12

Scientific classification
- Kingdom: Animalia
- Phylum: Arthropoda
- Clade: Pancrustacea
- Class: Insecta
- Order: Lepidoptera
- Family: Lycaenidae
- Genus: Cigaritis
- Species: C. nilus

Binomial name
- Cigaritis nilus (Hewitson, 1865)

Synonyms
- Aphnaeus nilus Hewitson, 1865; Apharitis nilus; Aphnaeus subaureus Grose-Smith, 1898; Spindasis kaduglii Bethune-Baker, 1916; Spindasis subaurea f. sabulosa Hawker-Smith, 1929

= Cigaritis nilus =

Species of butterfly

Cigaritis Nilus, the Saharan Silverline, is a butterfly in the family Lycaenidae. It is found in Senegal, the Gambia, Guinea, Mali, Burkina Faso, Ghana, northern and eastern Nigeria, Niger, Chad, Cameroon, southern Sudan, Uganda, and northern Kenya. The habitat consists of sub-deserts and deserts, the Sahel, Sudan savanna, and Guinea savanna.
