= Tarucus legrasi =

Scientific classification
- Kingdom: Animalia
- Phylum: Arthropoda
- Class: Insecta
- Order: Lepidoptera
- Family: Lycaenidae
- Genus: Tarucus
- Species: T. legrasi

Binomial name
- Tarucus legrasi Stempffer, 1948

Species of butterfly

Tarucus legrasi, the Le Gras' Pierrot, is a butterfly in the family Lycaenidae. It is found in Senegal, Burkina Faso, northern Ivory Coast, Nigeria (north of Kano), Niger (Aïr), northern Cameroon, Chad, Sudan, northern Uganda, north-western Kenya and Somalia. The habitat consists of an arid (Sahelian) savanna

The larvae feed on Ziziphus species.
