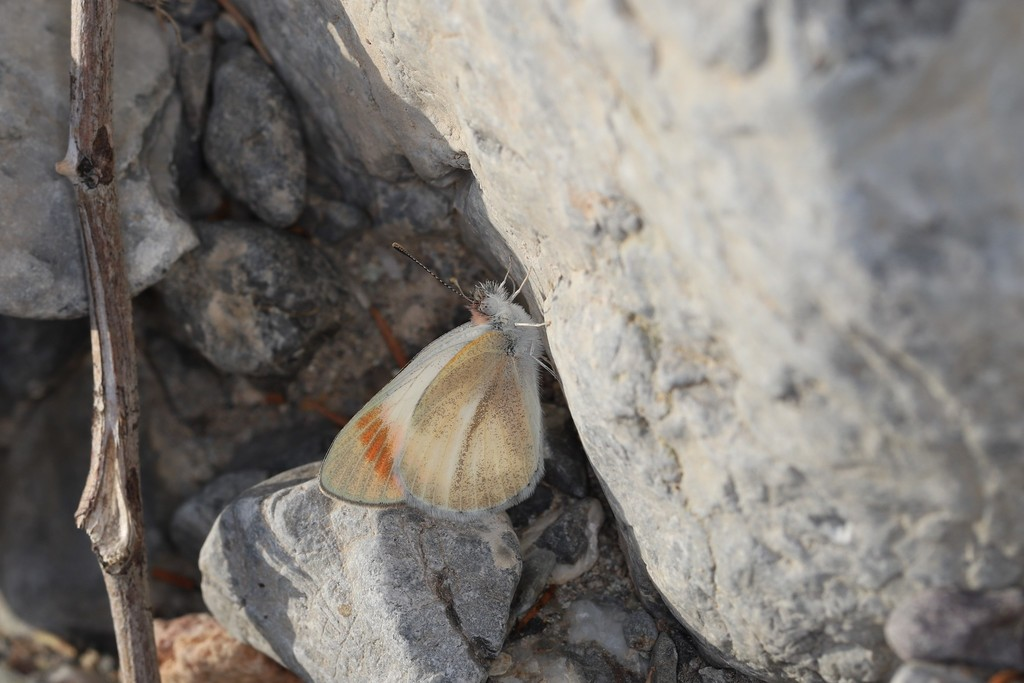

Scientific classification
- Kingdom: Animalia
- Phylum: Arthropoda
- Class: Insecta
- Order: Lepidoptera
- Family: Pieridae
- Genus: Colotis
- Species: C. liagore

Binomial name
- Colotis liagore (Klug, 1829)

Synonyms
- Pontia liagore Klug, 1829; Colotis (Colotis) liagore; Teracolus liagore f. liagoroides Rothschild, 1921; Colotis antigone antigone f. desertorum Talbot, 1939

= Colotis liagore =

Species of butterfly

Colotis liagore, the desert orange tip, is a butterfly in the family Pieridae. It is found in Mauritania, northern Senegal, northern Nigeria, Niger, Chad, Sudan, Ethiopia, Somalia, Arabia and the Baluchistan coast of Iran, United Arab Emirates and Pakistan. The habitat consists of moist savanna.

The larvae feed on Maerua and Capparis species.
