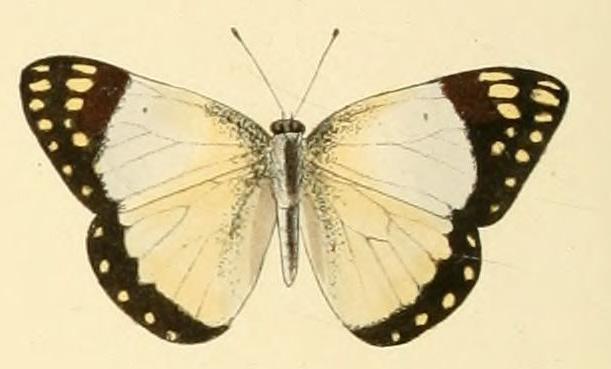

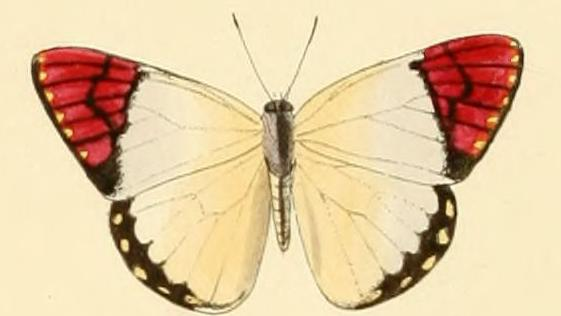

Scientific classification
- Kingdom: Animalia
- Phylum: Arthropoda
- Class: Insecta
- Order: Lepidoptera
- Family: Pieridae
- Genus: Colotis
- Species: C. celimene

Binomial name
- Colotis celimene (H. Lucas, 1852)

Synonyms
- Anthocharis celimene H. Lucas, 1852; Anthocharis amina Hewitson, [1862]; Anthopsyche pholoe Wallengren, 1860; Anthocharis phaenon Trimen, 1863; Teracolus praeclarus Butler, 1886; Teracolus celimene var. sudanicus Aurivillius, 1905

= Colotis celimene =

Lilac tip

Species of butterfly

Colotis celimene, the lilac tip or magenta tip, is a butterfly of the family Pieridae. The species was first described by Hippolyte Lucas in 1852. It is found in the Afrotropical realm.

== Description ==
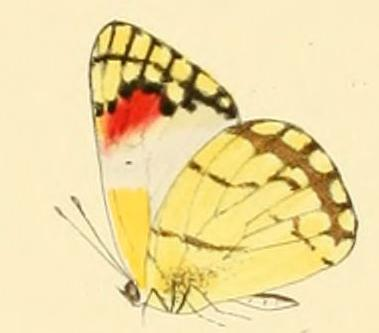

The wingspan is 37–40 mm. The adults fly year round, peaking from March to May.

== Habitat and behavior ==
Adults are observed residing near tall trees and thorny vegetation. They hover up to approximately 4 metres above ground level.

The larvae feed on Boscia albitrunca and Capparis species.

== Subspecies ==
The following subspecies are recognised:

- C. c. celimene (H. Lucas, 1852) (Ethiopia, Uganda, Kenya, Tanzania, Malawi)
- C. c. amina (Hewitson, 1866) (Zambia, Zimbabwe, Mozambique, Botswana (east), Eswatini, South Africa)
- C. c. angusi Rothschild, 1921 (Niger, central and western Sudan)
- C. c. pholoe (Wallengren, 1860) (Angola, western Botswana, Namibia)
- C. c. praeclarus (Butler, 1886) (Ethiopia, Somalia)
- C. c. sudanicus (Aurivillius, 1905) (eastern Senegal, Burkina Faso, northern Ghana, northern Nigeria, Niger to the Democratic Republic of the Congo, southern Sudan)
