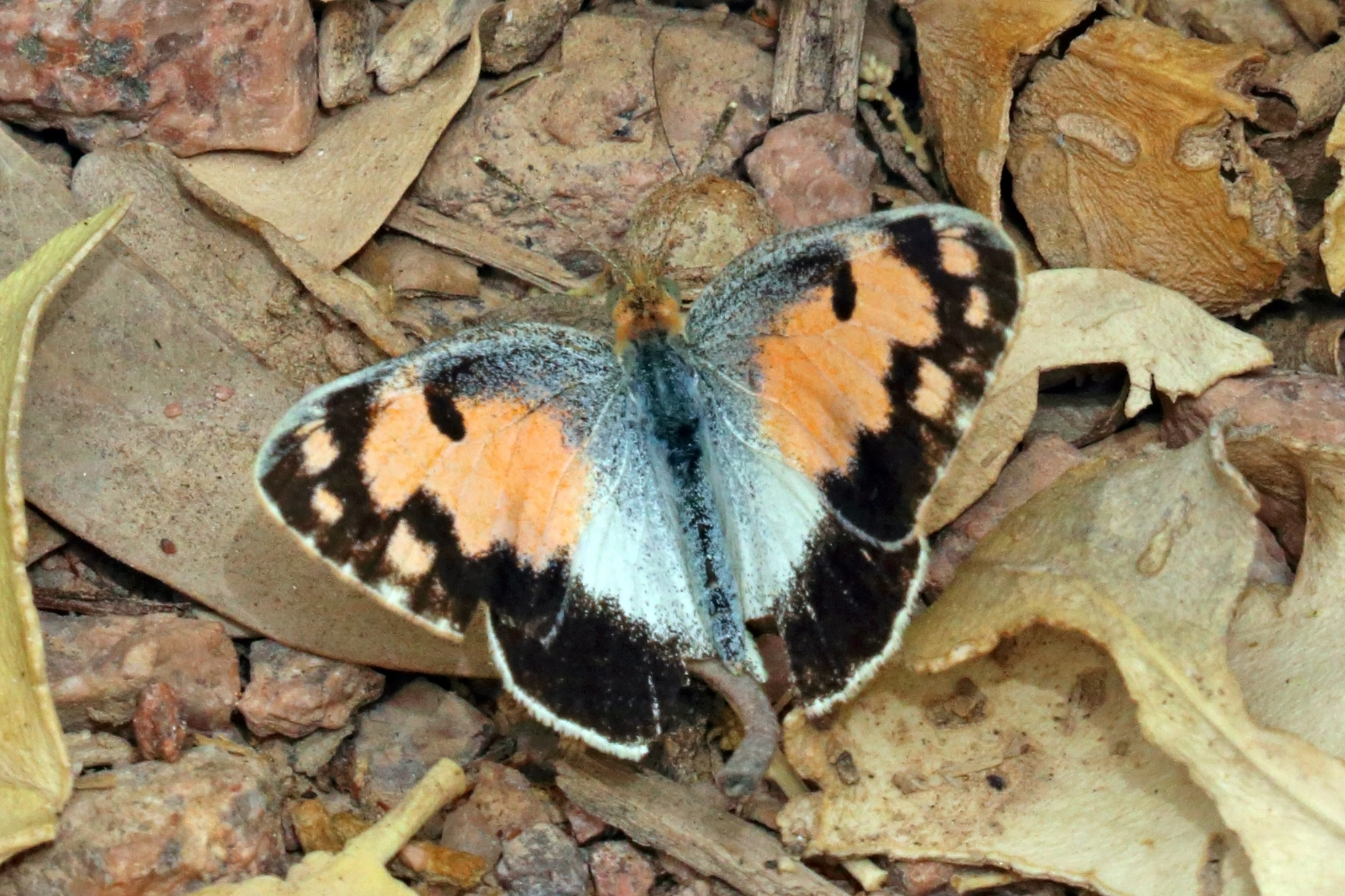

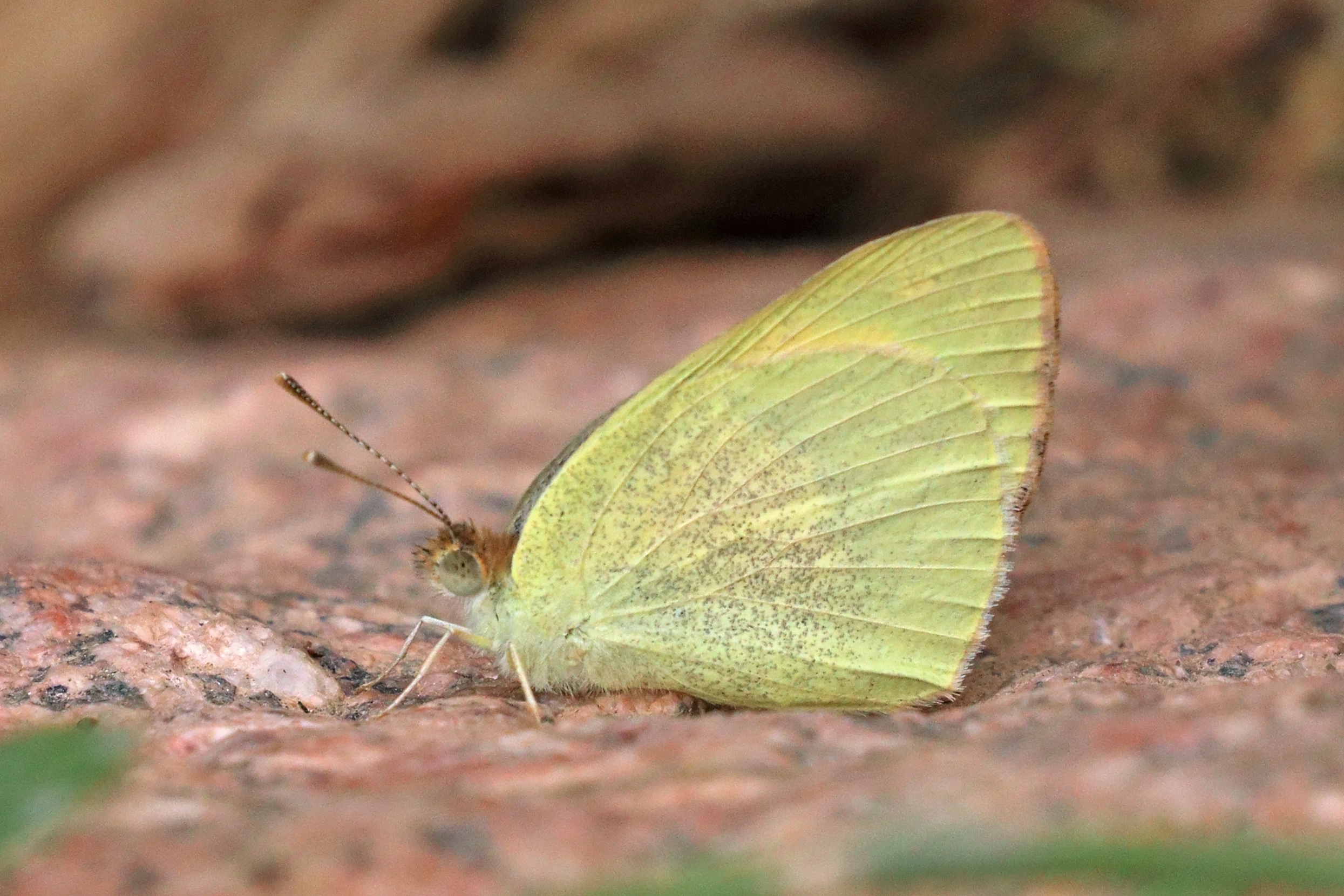
- both in Aqaba Bird Observatory, Jordan

Scientific classification
- Kingdom: Animalia
- Phylum: Arthropoda
- Class: Insecta
- Order: Lepidoptera
- Family: Pieridae
- Genus: Colotis
- Species: C. phisadia

Binomial name
- Colotis phisadia (Godart, 1819)

Synonyms
- Pieris phisadia Godart, 1819; Colotis (Colotis) phisadia; Pontia arne Klug, 1829; Idmais philumene Mabille, 1880; Teracolus ocellatus Butler, 1886; Teracolus rothschildi Sharpe, 1898; Teracolus phisadia rothschildi ab. albus Aurivillius, 1910; Teracolus phisadia rothschildi ab. ochraceus Aurivillius, 1910; Colotis phisadia r. somalica Storace, 1948; Colotis phisadia somalica ab. punctata Storace, 1948; Colotis phisadia somalica f. pallida Storace, 1948; Teracolus phisadia f. vagus d’Abrera, 1980; Teracolus phisadia f. vagus Riley, 1920

= Colotis phisadia =

Blue-spotted Arab

Species of butterfly

Colotis phisadia, the blue-spotted Arab, is a small butterfly of the family Pieridae, that is, the yellows and whites, which is found in Mauritania, Senegal, Mali, Nigeria, Niger, Chad, Sudan, Ethiopia, Kenya, Kuwait, Uganda, Arabia, the Near East and India.

== Description ==
Upperside of male forewing has a pale salmon-pink ground colour, this colour paler outwardly; base heavily irrorated (sprinkled) with bluish-grey scales that extend outwards and are merged with a black patch that occupies the apex of the cell and spreads along the discocellulars; terminal third of wing black with enclosed spots of the ground colour in interspaces 3, 4, 5 and 9, the spot in 4 sometimes absent, the inner edge of the black area emarginate at interspaces 2 and 4; the outer margin with a series of minute terminal specks of ground colour in the interspaces. Hindwing: white, base heavily irrorated with bluish-grey scales that are extended downwards in a diffuse band parallel to the dorsum; terminal half of wing jet black. Underside: precisely like the underside of C. protractus male. Antennae, head, thorax and abdomen as in C. protractus.

Female is very variable, but resembles the male in markings. On the upperside however, the terminal areas on both forewings and hindwings that are black in the male are silky brown on the forewing, the inner sinuate margin of the same posteriorly black; on the hindwing the terminal brown area encloses an irregular sinuate black band that does not extend either to the costa or the dorsum. The ground colour of the forewing in some specimens is faintly pink fading to white outwardly; on the hindwing the ground colour is white, as in the male. In other specimens the ground colour on both forewings and hindwings is entirely white or pinkish orange. Underside: as in the male, but the apical area of the forewing and the whole surface of the hindwing tinged more or less with ochraceous. In many individuals (probably of the dry-season broods) this ochraceous tint is very marked. Forewing: with posterior black spots as in the male. Hindwing: an irregular discal sinuate macular brown band that is often obsolescent. Antennae, head, thorax and abdomen much as in the male.

== Distribution ==
"The only records of the occurrence of this form within our limits are: a 6 specimen in the Indian Museum labelled 'Surat;' Dr. Manders got a single specimen at Multan in the Punjab; and Mabille gives it, but on what authority I do not know, from 'Northern India.'"

== Life history ==
Larva. Larva feeds on Salvadora persica. The following is a description of it: "Pea-green when young, two black spots on the back of the head, a white mark almost the shape of an ace of diamonds, but rather longer, on the second segment; when older, the black spots on the head disappear and the white mark gets clearer and is outlined with black. There are two similar marks just beyond the centre of the back, the front one being the smaller, and another similar mark on the eleventh segment." (Nurse quoted in Bingham)

Pupa. As figured is stout, pale brown, more or less mottled with darker brown, in shape mainly cylindrical, with the wing cases moderately developed; the head ends in a very sharp point.

== Subspecies ==
- C. p. phisadia (Mauritania, northern Senegal, Mali, north-eastern Nigeria, Niger, Chad, Sudan, Somalia, northern Ethiopia, western and southern Arabia)
- C. p. ocellatus (Butler, 1886) (Ethiopia)
- C. p. palaestinensis Staudinger, 1898
- C. p. rothschildi (Sharpe, 1898) (Kenya)
- C. p. somalica Storace, 1948 (Somalia)
- C. p. vagus d’Abrera, 1980 (northern Uganda, northern Kenya)

== See also ==
- List of butterflies of India
- List of butterflies of India (Pieridae)
