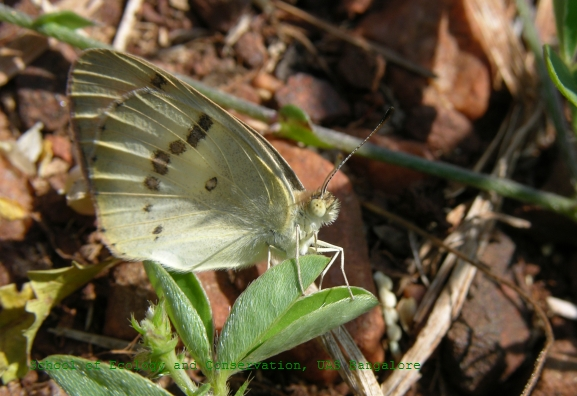
- Colotis danae

Scientific classification
- Kingdom: Animalia
- Phylum: Arthropoda
- Class: Insecta
- Order: Lepidoptera
- Family: Pieridae
- Tribe: Teracolini
- Genus: Colotis; Hübner, [1819]

Species
- See text

Synonyms
- Teracolus Swainson, [1833]; Idmais Boisduval, 1836; Callosune Doubleday, [1847]; Anthopsyche Wallengren, 1857; Ptychopteryx Wallengren, 1857; Thespia Wallengren, 1858; Calicharis Oberthür, 1876; Gideona Klots, 1933; Cuneacolotis Henning et al., 1997

= Colotis =

Butterfly genus in family Pieridae

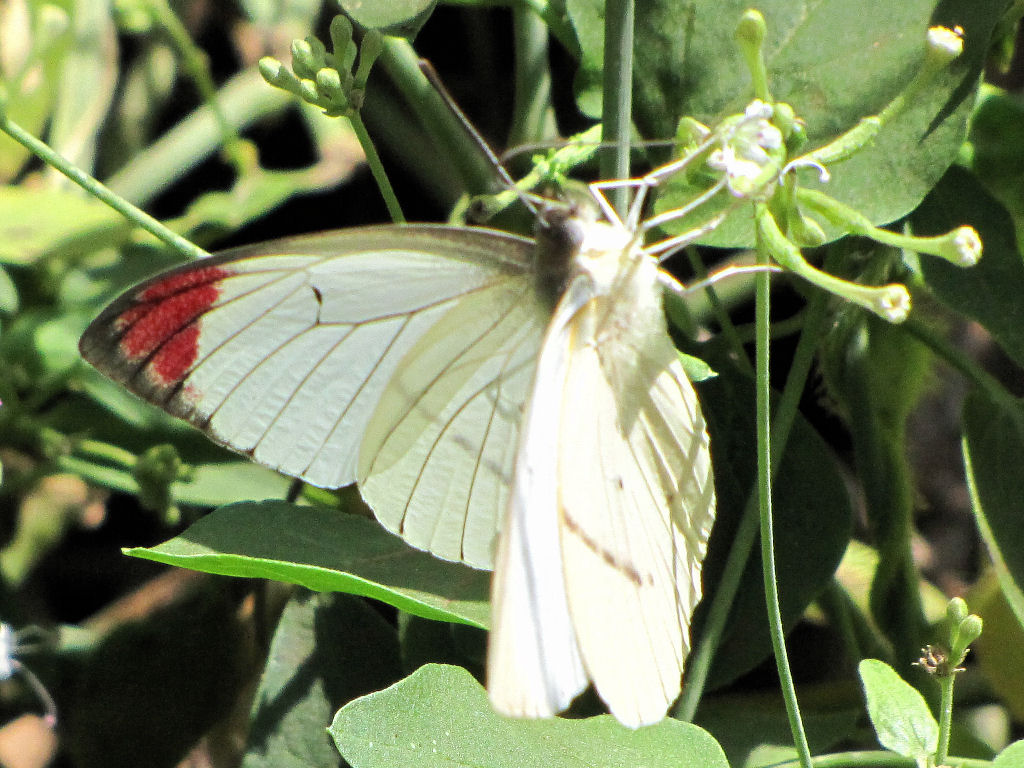
Scarlet tip (C. danae) Lake Manyara National Park, Tanzania

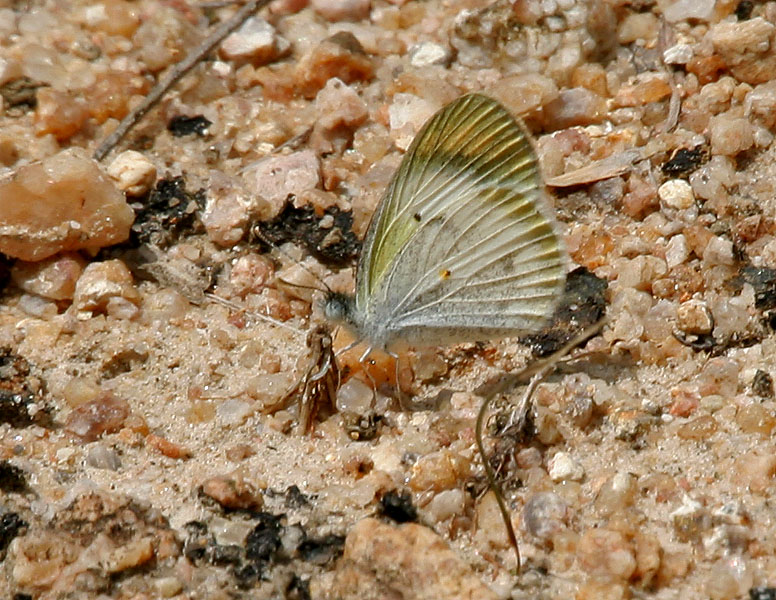
Small orange-tip (C. etrida) in Narsapur, Medak district, India

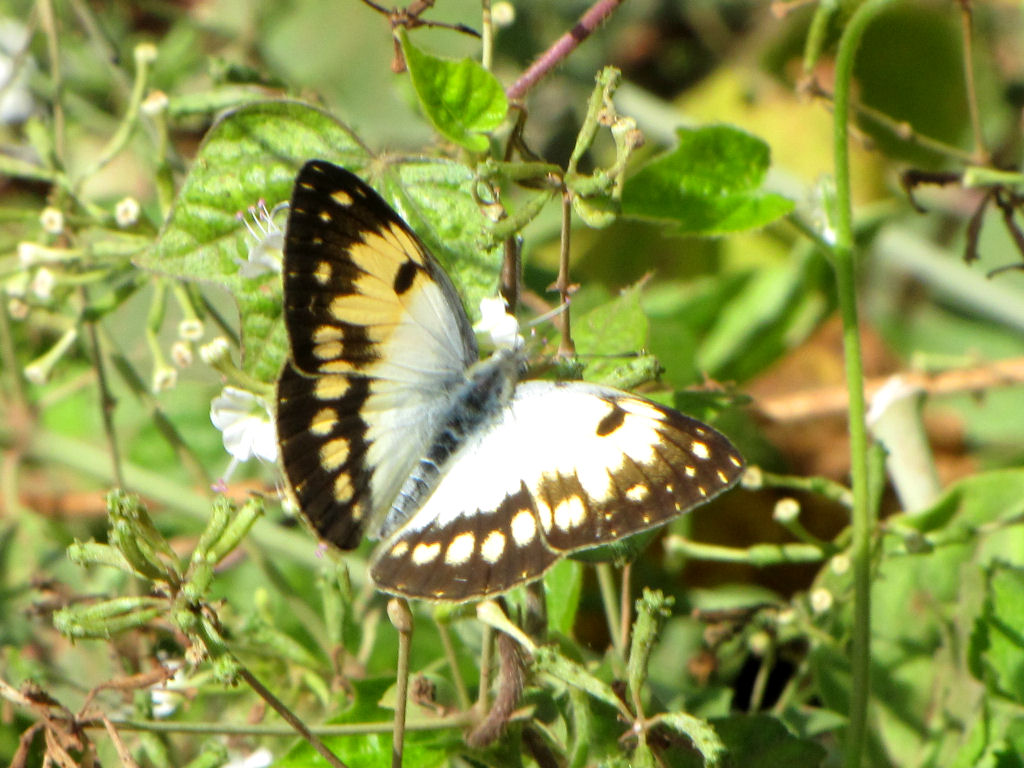
Veined tip (C. vesta) Lake Manyara National Park, Tanzania

Colotis, called orange tips or Arabs, is a genus of butterflies of the subfamily Pierinae found mainly in Africa and south-western Asia. The larvae of all Colotis species specialize on plants in the family Capparaceae.

== Species ==
Listed alphabetically within subgroups:

Subgenus Colotis Hübner, [1819]:

- Colotis amata (Fabricius, 1775) –
- Colotis antevippe (Boisduval, 1836) – large orange tip or red tip
- Colotis aurigineus (Butler, 1883) – African golden, Arab veined, or gold double-banded orange
- Colotis aurora (Cramer, [1780]) – plain orange tip
- Colotis auxo (Lucas, 1852) – sulphur orange tip or yellow orange tip
- Colotis calais (Cramer, 1775) – topaz Arab
- Colotis celimene (Lucas, 1852) – lilac tip or magenta tip
- Colotis chrysonome (Klug, 1829) – golden Arab
- Colotis daira (Klug, 1829) – black-marked orange tip
- Colotis danae (Fabricius, 1775) – scarlet tip or crimson tip
- Colotis dissociatus (Butler, 1897)
- Colotis doubledayi (Hopffer, 1862) – Doubleday's tip
- Colotis elgonensis (Sharpe, 1891) – Elgon crimson tip
- Colotis ephyia (Klug, 1829)
- Colotis erone (Angas, 1849) – coast purple tip
- Colotis etrida (Boisduval, 1836) – (small) orange tip
- Colotis eucharis (Fabricius, 1775) – plain orange tip or sulphur orange tip
- Colotis euippe (Linnaeus, 1758) – round winged orange tip
- Colotis eunoma (Hopffer, 1855) – three spot crimson tip
- Colotis evagore (Klug, 1829) – desert orange tip, small orange tip or tiny orange tip
- Colotis evanthe (Boisduval, 1836) – Madagascar orange-tip
- Colotis evanthides (Holland, 1896)
- Colotis evenina (Wallengren, 1857) – common orange tip
- Colotis fausta (Olivier, 1804) – (large) salmon Arab
- Colotis guenei (Mabille, 1877) – Madagascar red-tip
- Colotis halimede (Klug, 1829) – yellow patch, white orange patch white, white and orange Halimede, or dappled white
- Colotis hetaera (Gerstaecker, 1871) – crimson tip or coast purple tip
- Colotis hildebrandti (Staudinger, 1885) – golden tip
- Colotis incretus (Butler, 1881)
- Colotis ione (Godart, 1819) – Bushveld purple tip, (common) purple tip or violet tip
- Colotis lais (Butler, 1876)
- Colotis liagore (Klug, 1829)
- Colotis mananhari (Ward, 1870) – chevron white
- Colotis pallene (Hopffer, 1855) – Bushveld orange tip
- Colotis phisadia (Godart, 1819) – blue-spotted Arab or variable colotis
- Colotis protractus Butler, 1876
- Colotis pleione (Klug, 1829) – orange patch white
- Colotis protomedia (Klug, 1829) – yellow splendour
- Colotis regina (Trimen, 1863) – large violet tip, regal purple tip, or queen purple tip
- Colotis rogersi (Dixey, 1915) – Rogers' orange tip
- Colotis ungemachi (Le Cerf, 1922)
- Colotis venosa (Staudinger, 1885) – no patch white
- Colotis vesta (Reiche, 1849) – veined orange, veined tip, or veined golden Arab
- Colotis vestalis (Butler, 1876) – white Arab
- Colotis zoe (Grandidier, 1867) – violet-tip

Subgenus Teracolus (Swainson, 1833):

- Colotis eris (Klug, 1829) – banded gold tip or black-barred gold tip
- Colotis subfasciatus (Swainson, 1833) – lemon traveller or lemon tip

Subgenus Cuneacolotis (Henning et al., 1997):

- Colotis agoye (Wallengren, 1857) – speckled sulphur tip

Subgenus Gideona (Klots, 1933):

- Colotis lucasi (Grandidier, 1867) – giant orange-tip

Status unknown:

- Colotis fallax (Wichgraf, 1913), described from East Africa
