= Iolaus sudanicus =

Scientific classification
- Kingdom: Animalia
- Phylum: Arthropoda
- Clade: Pancrustacea
- Class: Insecta
- Order: Lepidoptera
- Family: Lycaenidae
- Genus: Iolaus
- Species: I. sudanicus

Binomial name
- Iolaus sudanicus Aurivillius, 1905

Synonyms
- Jolaus umbrosus var. sudanicus Aurivillius, 1905; Iolaus (Epamera) sudanicus

Species of butterfly

Iolaus sudanicus, the Sudanian sapphire, is a butterfly in the family Lycaenidae. It is found in Senegal, Burkina Faso, northern Nigeria, Niger, Chad, southern Sudan and Ethiopia. The habitat consists of Sudan savanna and the Sahel.

The larvae feed on Loranthus species.
