= Colotis protractus =

Scientific classification
- Kingdom: Animalia
- Phylum: Arthropoda
- Class: Insecta
- Order: Lepidoptera
- Family: Pieridae
- Genus: Colotis
- Species: C. protractus

Binomial name
- Colotis protractus Butler, 1876

Species of butterfly

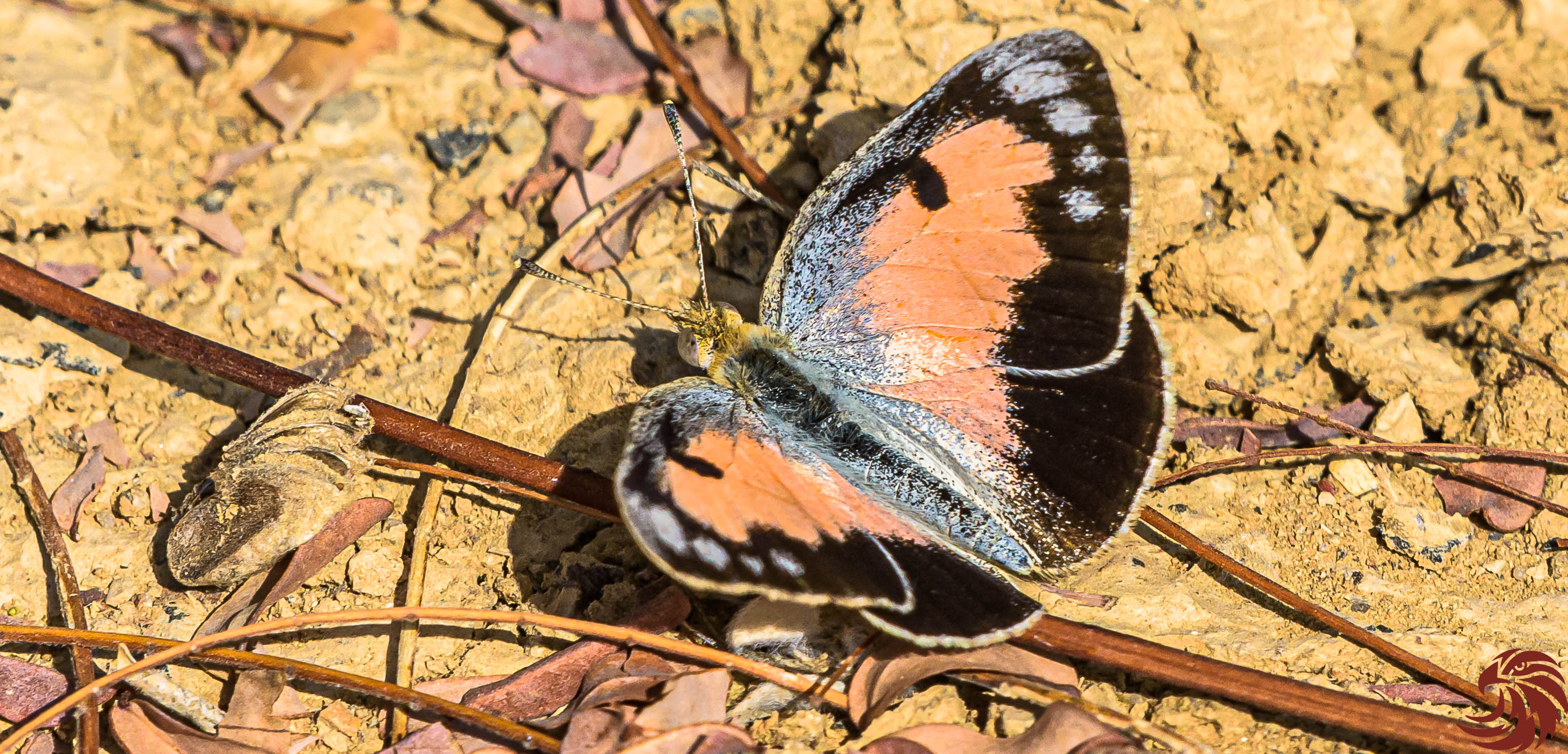
Blue Spotted Arab openwing, in Great Rann of Kutchh, India

Colotis protractus, the Blue Spotted Arab, is a butterfly in the family Pieridae. It is found in North West India, Punjab and Balochistan.

== Subspecies ==
- Colotis protractus protractus
- Colotis protractus semiramis Grum-Grshimailo, 1902

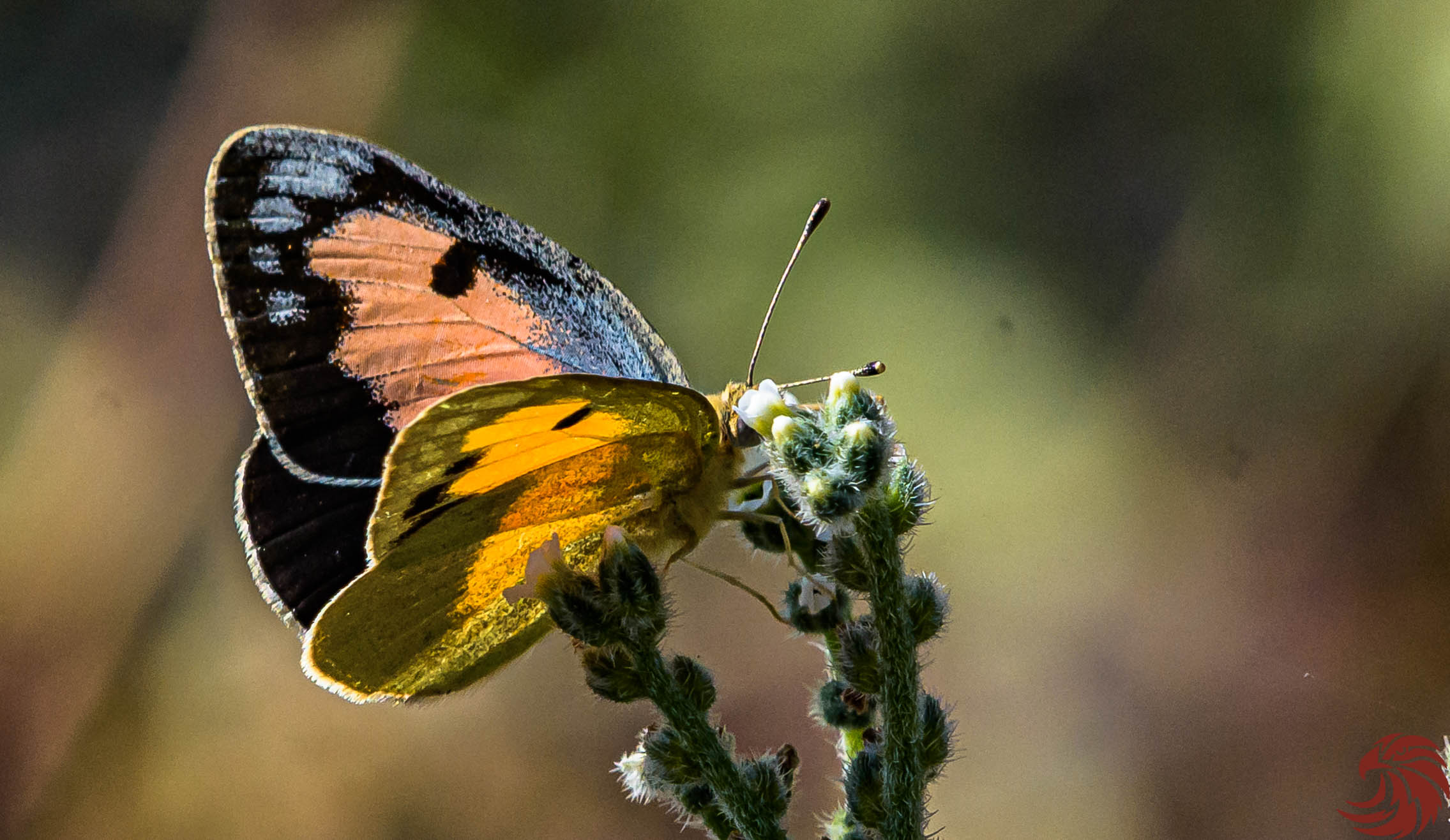
Blue Spotted Arab, Great Rann of Kutchh, India
