= Vagrant (disambiguation) =

A vagrant is a person who lives without a home or regular employment and wanders from place to place.

Vagrant or vagrancy may also refer to:

== Biology ==
=== Concepts ===
- Vagrancy (biology), the state of roaming or growing far outside of ones species' usual range
- Vagrant lichen, a lichen that is (or can become) unattached from a substrate, yet continue to flourish

=== Insects ===
==== Butterflies ====
- Catopsilia florella, a species in the family Pieridae known as the common vagrant
- Eronia, a genus in the family Pieridae commonly known as the vagrants
  - Eronia cleodora, a species commonly known as the vine-leaf vagrant
  - Eronia leda, a species commonly known as the autumn leaf vagrant
- Nepheronia, another genus of Pieridae commonly known as (plain) vagrants
  - Nepheronia argia, an African species known as the large vagrant
  - Nepheronia thalassina, a species known as the Cambridge vagrant
  - Nepheronia pharis, a species known as the round-winged vagrant
- Vagrans egista, a South and Southeast Asian species in the family Nymphalidae commonly known as the vagrant

==== Dragonflies ====
- Hemianax ephippiger, an African species of dragonfly in the family Aeshnidae commonly known as the vagrant emperor
- Vagrant darter, (Sympetrum vulgatum), a European dragonfly

=== Other uses in biology ===
- Vagrant shrew, a genus of medium-sized shrews found in North America
- Uliodon, a genus of spiders found in New Zealand and Australia and commonly referred to as vagrant spiders

== Media ==
=== Music ===
- The Vagrants, a mid-sixties Long Island rock and blue-eyed soul band
- Vagrant Records, an indie rock record label, founded in 1996

=== Film ===
- The Vagrant (1992 film), a 1992 comedy film starring Bill Paxton
- Vagrant (2020 film), a 2020 drama film directed by Caleb Ryan

=== Other uses in media ===
- The Vagrant (TV series), a 2002 Singapore TV series
- The Vagrant, a 2015 novel by Peter Newman
- The Vagrant (video game), a 2017 video game also called Sword of the Vagrant
- The Vagrants (novel), a novel by Yiyun Li
- "Vagrants" (Task), an episode of the American crime drama television series Task

== Other uses ==
- Vagrancy (horse), an American racehorse
- Vagrant (software), for creating and configuring virtual development environments, in technology
- Vagrant (horse), an American racehorse, winner of the 1876 Kentucky Derby
- Vagrant Island, Graham Land, Antarctica
- Vagrant predicate, logical constructions that exhibit an inherent limit to conceptual knowledge
- ST Vagrant, a tugboat
- Bụi đời (Vietnamese for "dust of life"), vagrants in the city

== See also ==
- Vagabond (disambiguation)
- Wandering (disambiguation)
