= African small white =

African small white may refer to

- Dixeia charina, a butterfly endemic to Africa's east coast from the Horn of Africa to the Cape region
- Dixeia doxo, a butterfly endemic to Africa's east coast and large parts of central Africa
