= Meander (disambiguation) =

A meander is a bend in a river.

Meander may also refer to:

== Geography ==
=== Municipalities or communities ===
- Meander, Mississippi, former name of Gholson, an unincorporated community in Noxubee County, Mississippi, U.S.
- Meander, Tasmania, a rural town in Meander Valley Council area, Tasmania, Australia
- Meander Valley Council, a rural local government area in Tasmania, Australia

== Geographical features ==
- Meander Dam, a concrete gravity dam across the Upper Meander River, Tasmania, Australia
- Meander Glacier, a large meandering tributary to Mariner Glacier in Victoria Land, Antarctica
- Meander River (disambiguation), several rivers that share the name
  - Meander River (Tasmania), Australia

== Arts, entertainment, and media ==
- Meander (album), 1995 album by the band Carbon Leaf
- Meander (art), a decorative border constructed from a continuous line, shaped into a repeated motif
- Meander (film), a 2020 French science fiction film

== Ships ==
- Meander (1855), a passenger steamship built for James Moss & Co. of Liverpool
- HMS Maeander, the name of two ships of the Royal Navy

== Other uses ==
- Meander (mathematics), a self-avoiding closed curve which intersects a line a number of times
- Meander (mythology), a river god in Greek mythology and patron of the Maeander River in Turkey
- Meander Eatery, a restaurant in Pagosa Springs, Colorado, U.S.
- Meander Prepona (Archaeoprepona meander), a butterfly in the family Nymphalida

== See also ==
- Wandering (disambiguation)
