= Wandering =

Wandering may refer to:

- Wandering (dementia)
- Wandering (EP), a 2021 EP by JO1
- Wandering, Western Australia, a town located in the Wheatbelt region of Western Australia
- Shire of Wandering, a local government area in the Wheatbelt region of Western Australia
- "Wandering", a song by the Cat Empire, a B-side to "Days Like These"

== See also ==
- Wander (disambiguation)
- Wanderer (disambiguation)
- Jitter
- Joyride (crime)
- Meander (disambiguation)
- Russian wandering, a form of religious devotion in Russian Orthodoxy
- Vagabond (disambiguation)
- Vagrant (disambiguation)
