= Black-veined white =

Black-veined white may refer to

- Aporia crataegi, a butterfly endemic to Europe, temperate Asia, and Siberia
- Dixeia doxo, a butterfly endemic to central and eastern Africa

== See also ==
- Brown-veined white
- Green-veined white
