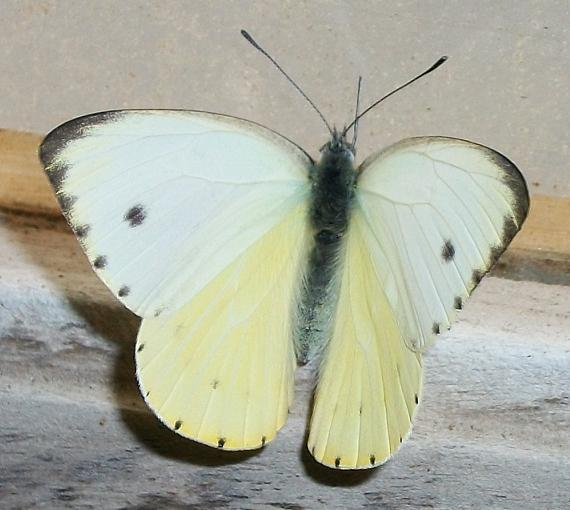
- Female Dixeia pigea

Scientific classification
- Kingdom: Animalia
- Phylum: Arthropoda
- Clade: Pancrustacea
- Class: Insecta
- Order: Lepidoptera
- Family: Pieridae
- Tribe: Pierini
- Genus: Dixeia; Talbot, 1932

Species
- See text

= Dixeia =

Butterfly genus in family Pieridae

Dixeia, commonly called the small whites, is a genus of butterflies of the subfamily Pierini in the family Pieridae that are found mainly in Africa.

They are not to be confused with the cabbage white butterfly, Pieris rapae, which is referred to as the "small white" in several European nations.

== Species ==
Listed alphabetically:

- Dixeia capricornus (Ward, 1871)
- Dixeia cebron Ward, 1871
- Dixeia charina (Boisduval, [1836]) – African small white
- Dixeia dixeyi (Neave, 1904)
- Dixeia doxo (Godart, [1819]) – black-veined white
- Dixeia leucophanes Vári, 1976
- Dixeia orbona (Geyer, 1837)
- Dixeia pigea (Boisduval, 1836) – ant-heap white or ant-heap small white
- Dixeia piscicollis Pinhey, 1972
- Dixeia spilleri (Spiller, 1884) – Spiller's (sulphur) yellow or Spiller's canary white
