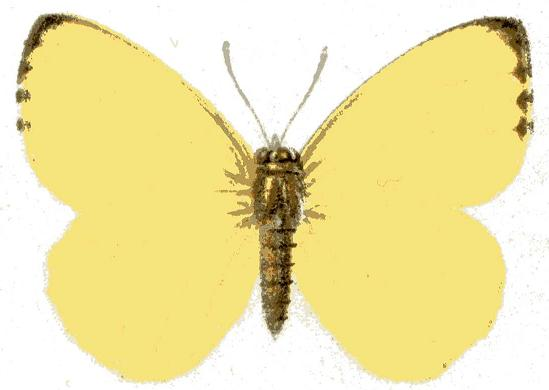

Scientific classification
- Kingdom: Animalia
- Phylum: Arthropoda
- Class: Insecta
- Order: Lepidoptera
- Family: Pieridae
- Genus: Dixeia
- Species: D. spilleri

Binomial name
- Dixeia spilleri (Spiller, 1884)

Synonyms
- Pieris spilleri Spiller, 1884; Pieris gallenga Grose-Smith, 1887; Dixeia spilleri f. flavalba Talbot, 1943; Dixeia spilleri f. nubila Berger, 1980

= Dixeia spilleri =

Spiller's (sulphur) yellow

Species of butterfly

Dixeia spilleri the Spiller's (sulphur) yellow or Spiller's canary white, is a butterfly in the family Pieridae. It is native to southern and eastern Africa.

The wingspan is 33–40 mm in males and 35–42 mm in females. Its flight period is year-round.

Larvae feed on Capparis species.
