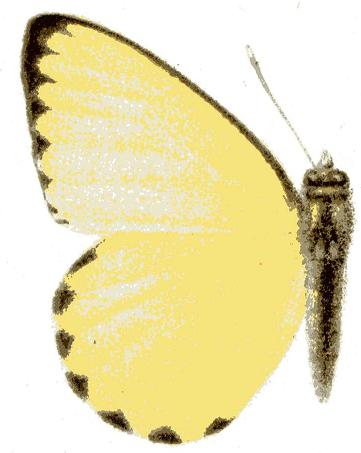
- Male
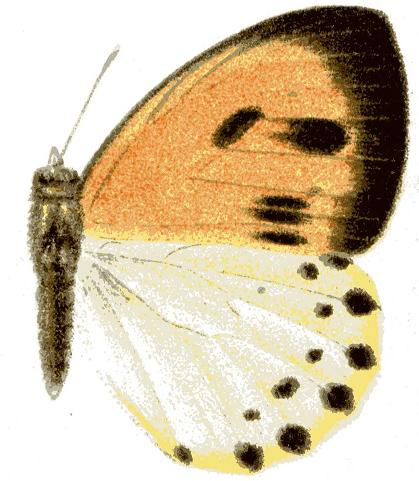
- Female

Scientific classification
- Kingdom: Animalia
- Phylum: Arthropoda
- Clade: Pancrustacea
- Class: Insecta
- Order: Lepidoptera
- Family: Pieridae
- Genus: Dixeia
- Species: D. cebron

Binomial name
- Dixeia cebron (Ward, 1871)

Synonyms
- Pieris cebron Ward, 1871; Dixeia cebron f. usitatus Talbot, 1943; Dixeia cebron asignata Bernardi, 1961

= Dixeia cebron =

Cebron white

Species of butterfly

Dixeia cebron, the Cebron white, is a butterfly in the family Pieridae. It is found in Ivory Coast, Ghana, southern Nigeria, Cameroon, the Republic of Congo, Gabon, and possibly the western part of the Democratic Republic of Congo. The habitat consists of dry and open forests.

Torben Larsen developed a species numbering system for his 2005 publication Butterflies of West Africa. This species is #80. The 'Larsen' numbers have since been used with permission in A Sharp Eye on Butterflies of Ghana.
