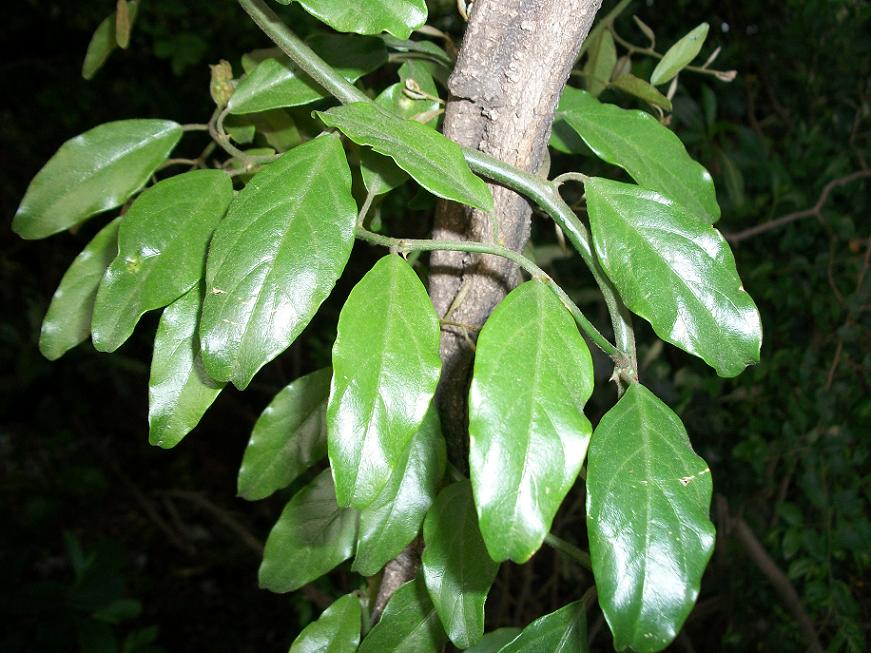
- Capparis fascicularis var. fascicularis

Scientific classification
- Kingdom: Plantae
- Clade: Tracheophytes
- Clade: Angiosperms
- Clade: Eudicots
- Clade: Rosids
- Order: Brassicales
- Family: Capparaceae
- Genus: Capparis
- Species: C. fascicularis

Binomial name
- Capparis fascicularis DC.

Synonyms
- Capparis flanaganii Gilg & Gilg-Ben. (1915); Capparis rudatisii Gilg & Gilg-Ben. (1915); Capparis transvaalensis Schinz (1912); Capparis calvescens Gilg & Gilg-Ben. (1915) not Gilg & Benedict!; Capparis somalensis Gilg (1895); Capparis rothii Oliv. (1868); Capparis jodotricha Gilg & Gilg-Ben. (1915); Capparis oliveriana Gilg; Capparis schlechteri Schinz (1912); Capparis solanoides Gilg & Gilg-Ben. (1915) not Gilg & Benedict!; Capparis marlothii Gilg & Gilg-Ben. (1915) not Gilg & Benedict!

= Capparis fascicularis =

Zigzag caper-bush

Species of flowering plant

Capparis fascicularis, the zigzag caper-bush, is a plant in the Capparaceae family and is native to Africa.

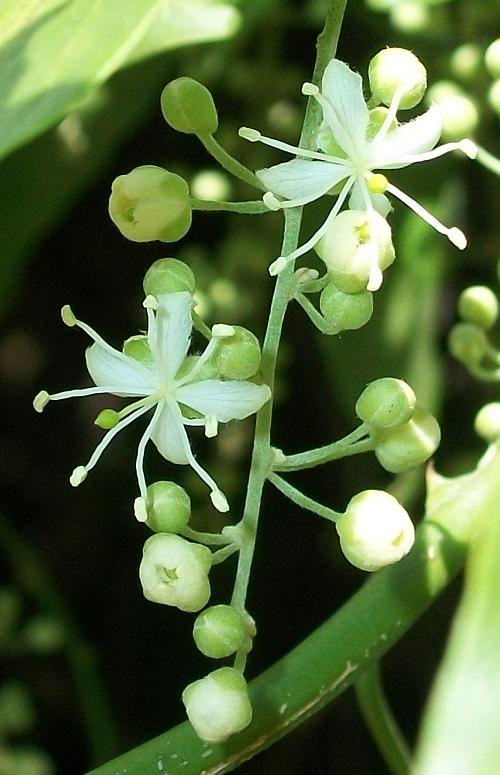
Flowers of Capparis fascicularis var. zeyheri

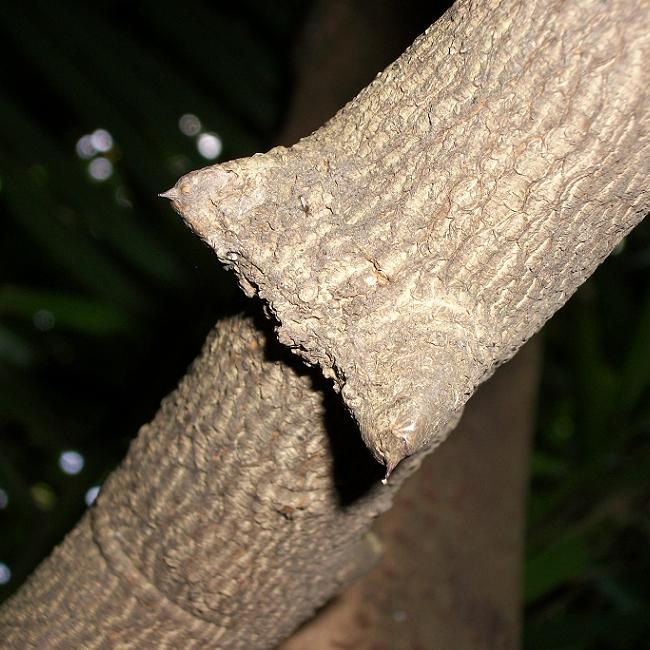
Portion of a mature stem of C. f. var. zeyheri showing paired spines

== Taxonomy ==
This species has multiple synonyms. The species is said to comprise three varieties, but four are listed:

- Capparis fascicularis DC. var. fascicularis (1824)
- Capparis fascicularis var. zeyheri (Turcz.) Toelken (1824)
- Capparis fascicularis var. elaeagnoides (Gilg) DeWolf (1824)
- Capparis fascicularis var. scheffleri (Gilg & Gilg-Ben.) DeWolf (1824)

== Distribution and habitat ==
Occurs from the Eastern Cape of South Africa, through KwaZulu-Natal, Eswatini, Mpumalanga, Limpopo, Mozambique and Zimbabwe. The range extends further to East Africa, Ethiopia, and across northern Nigeria, Niger and the Gambia. This species generally occurs in deciduous bushland and thickets, grassland with scattered trees, upland dry evergreen and riverine forest, and sometimes on termite-mounds. Var. fascicularis is found in dry bushveld or dry deciduous woodland in South Africa, Zimbabwe, Mozambique and Eswatini. Var. zeyheri is found in forest, bushveld and woodland near the coast in KwaZulu-Natal and the Eastern Cape, South Africa. Var. elaeagnoides is found in Zambia, Tanzania, Kenya, Uganda, Somalia, Ethiopia, Sudan, Niger, Nigeria, Mali and the Gambia.

== Description ==
A scrambling shrub or climber, usually with hooked spines on the stem. Two varieties are known in South Africa; var. fascicularis (zigzag caper-bush) and var. zeyheri (coast zigzag caper-bush). The most notable difference between these two varieties is that var. fascicularis has indented (notched) leaf-tips whereas var. zeyheri has pointed leaf-tips. The spines on the coast zigzag caper-bush are usually reduced or absent. The fragrant flowers are whitish and produced on leafless side branchlets which resemble spikes or racemes. The fruit are spherical and 6–15 mm in diameter, ripening to purple-black.

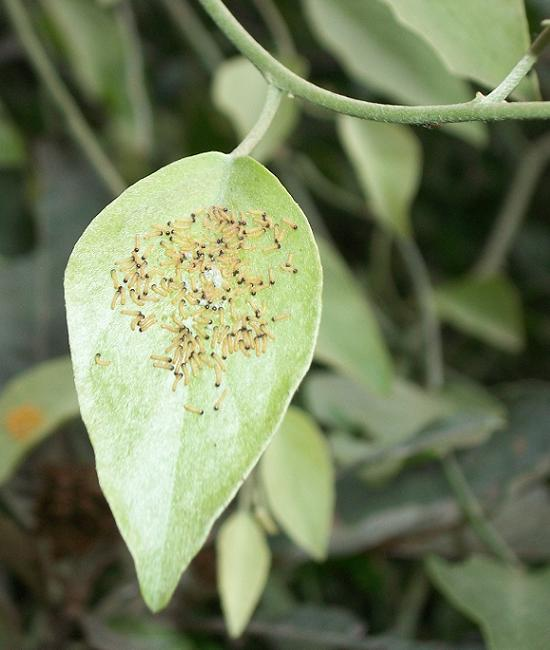
Larvae of Belenois creona on leaf of Capparis fascicularis var. zeyheri

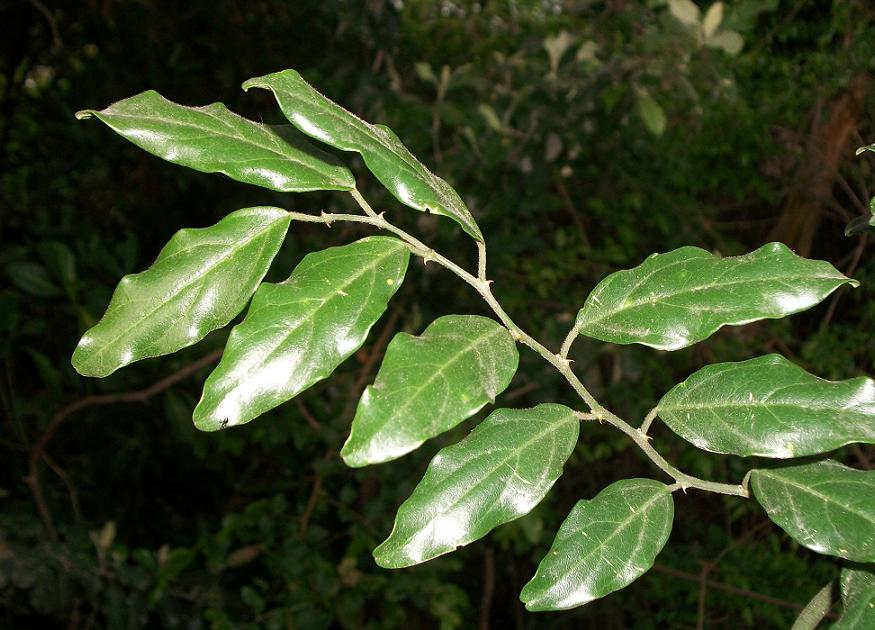
Var. fascicularis

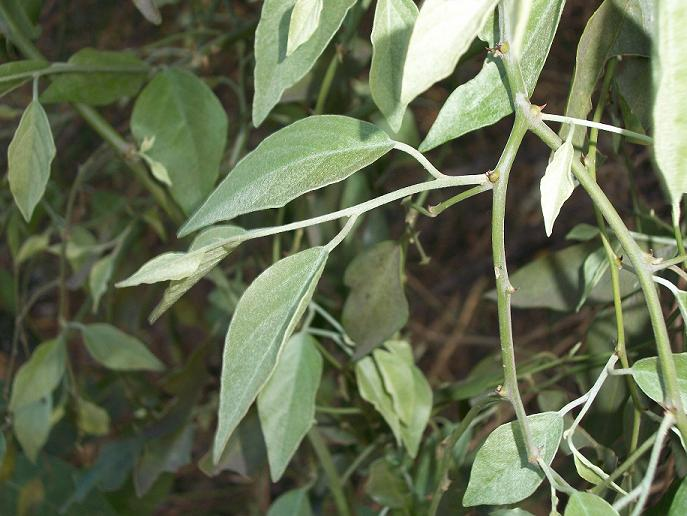
Var. zeyheri

== Human uses ==
The leaves are sold as food in markets of northern Nigeria.

== Ecological significance ==
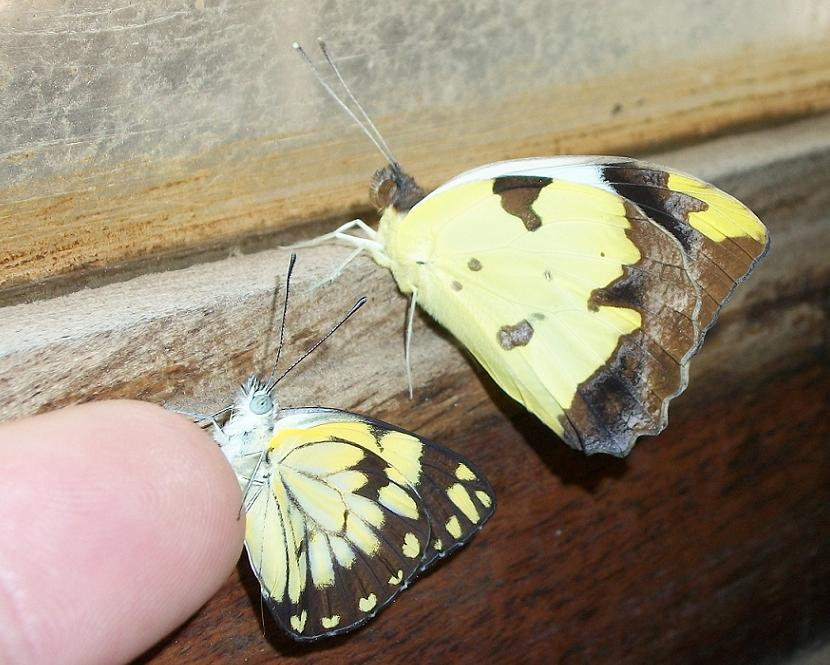
Belenois creona (left) and Eronia cleodora (right); raised on C. fascicularis var. zeyheri

Capparis fascicularis is the larval foodplant of the butterflies Belenois creona and Eronia cleodora.
