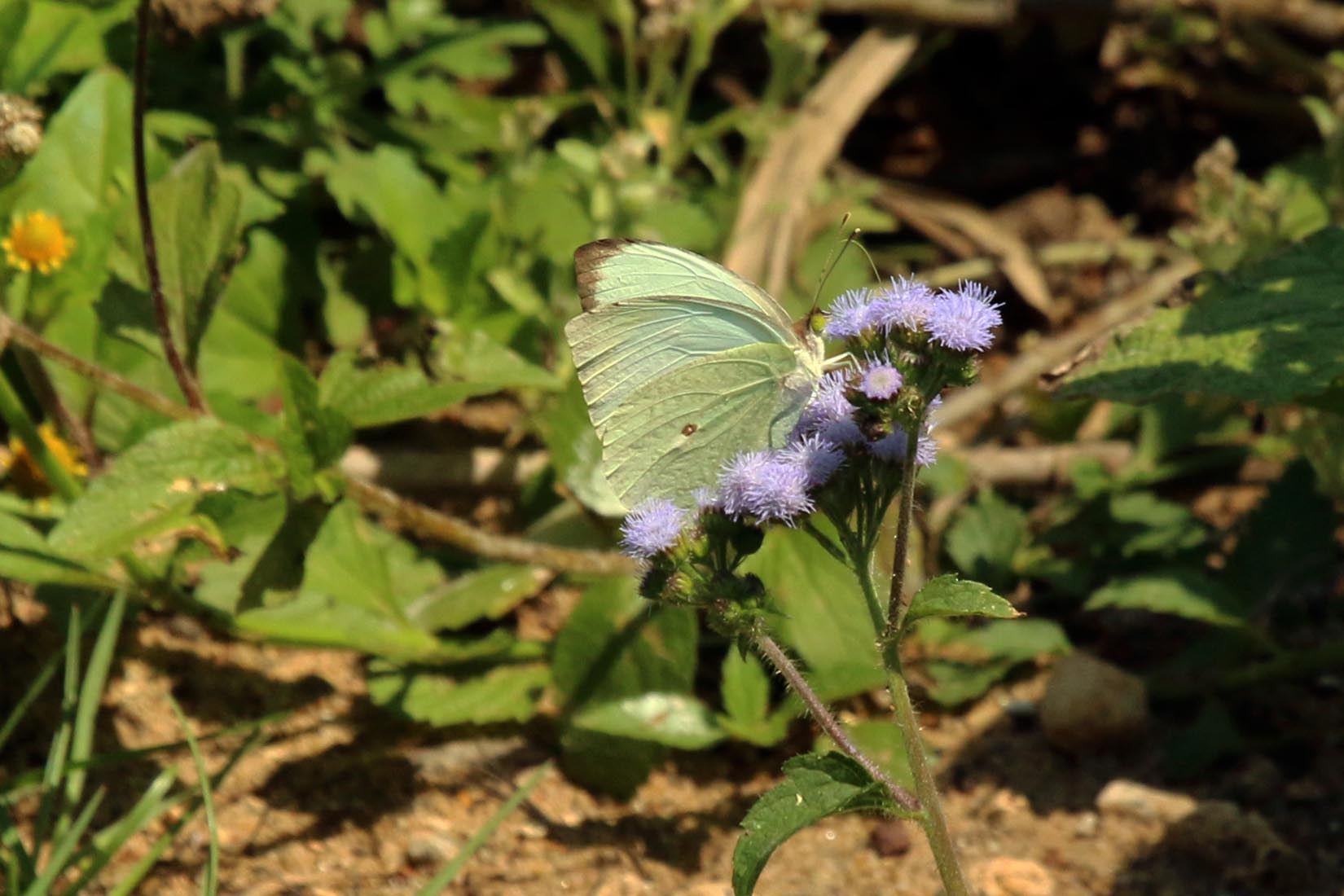
- At iSimangaliso Wetland Park, KwaZulu-Natal, South Africa

Conservation status
- Least Concern (IUCN 3.1)

Scientific classification
- Kingdom: Animalia
- Phylum: Arthropoda
- Class: Insecta
- Order: Lepidoptera
- Family: Pieridae
- Genus: Nepheronia
- Species: N. buquetii

Binomial name
- Nepheronia buquetii (Boisduval, 1836)

Synonyms
- Callidryas buquetii Boisduval, 1836; Eronia buqueti adam Suffert, 1904; Eronia buquetii var. mossambicensis Hopffer, 1862; Eronia buquetii var. arabica Hopffer, 1862; Eronia buquetii var. capensis Hopffer, 1862; Eronia zelinda Ward, 1873

= Nepheronia buquetii =

Plain vagrant

Species of butterfly

Nepheronia buquetii, the plain vagrant, Buquet's vagrant, or green-eyed monster, is a butterfly of the family Pieridae. It is found throughout Africa.

The wingspan is 45–50 mm for males and 48–56 mm for females. Adults are on the wing year-round, more commonly in winter months.

The larvae feed on Azima tetracantha and Salvadora persica.

== Subspecies ==
- N. b. buquetii (Boisduval, 1836) (northern Senegal, Niger, Nigeria, Democratic Republic of the Congo, Sudan, Ethiopia, Somalia, coast of Kenya, coast of Tanzania, Zambia, northern Namibia, northern Botswana, Mozambique, Zimbabwe, Eswatini, South Africa)
- N. b. buchanani (Rothschild, 1921) (North Africa, south-western Saudi Arabia, Yemen)
- N. b. pauliani Bernardi, 1958 (Madagascar)
