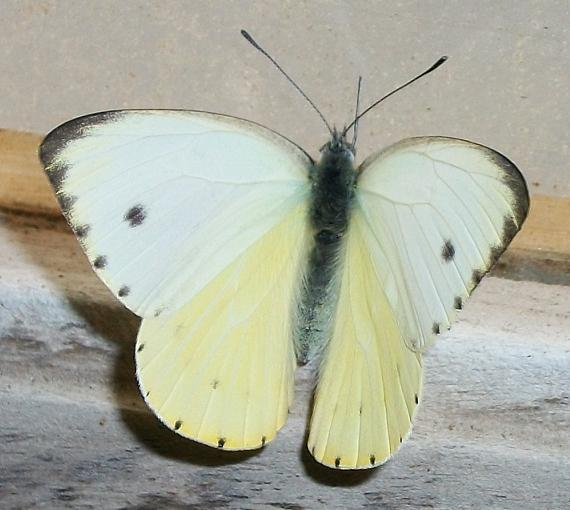
- Female

Scientific classification
- Kingdom: Animalia
- Phylum: Arthropoda
- Clade: Pancrustacea
- Class: Insecta
- Order: Lepidoptera
- Family: Pieridae
- Genus: Dixeia
- Species: D. pigea

Binomial name
- Dixeia pigea (Boisduval, 1836)

Synonyms
- Pieris pigea Boisduval, 1836; Pinacopteryx alba Wallengren, 1857; Belenois inana Butler, 1870; Pieris pigea ab. rubrobasalis Lanz, 1896; Pieris pigea ab. caffraria Lanz, 1896; Pieris rubrobasalis var. nitida Aurivillius, 1899; Pieris saalmuelleri Aurivillius, 1899; Pinacopteryx astarte Butler, 1900; Dixeia astarte; Pieris kueckeni Suffert, 1904; Pieris wagneri Suffert, 1904; Pieris rubrobasalis ab. lathyana Strand, 1909; Pieris elia Strand, 1912; Pieris pigea f. lathyi Hulstaert, 1924; Pieris leplaei Hulstaert, 1924; Pieris leplaei f. reducta Hulstaert, 1924; Pieris pigea pigea f. vulgaris Ungemach, 1932; Pieris pigea pigea f. rubritincta Ungemach, 1932; Pieris pigea pigea f. lutea Ungemach, 1932; Pieris pigea ab. citrina Romieux, 1934; Dixeia pigea f. citreus Talbot, 1943; Dixeia pigea f. luteola Talbot, 1943; Dixeia pigea f. lutescens Talbot, 1943; Dixeia pigea f. erubescens Talbot, 1943

= Dixeia pigea =

Ant-heap white
- Male, form alba, Tanzania

Species of butterfly

Dixeia pigea, the ant-heap small white or ant-heap white, is a butterfly in the family Pieridae that is native to Africa.

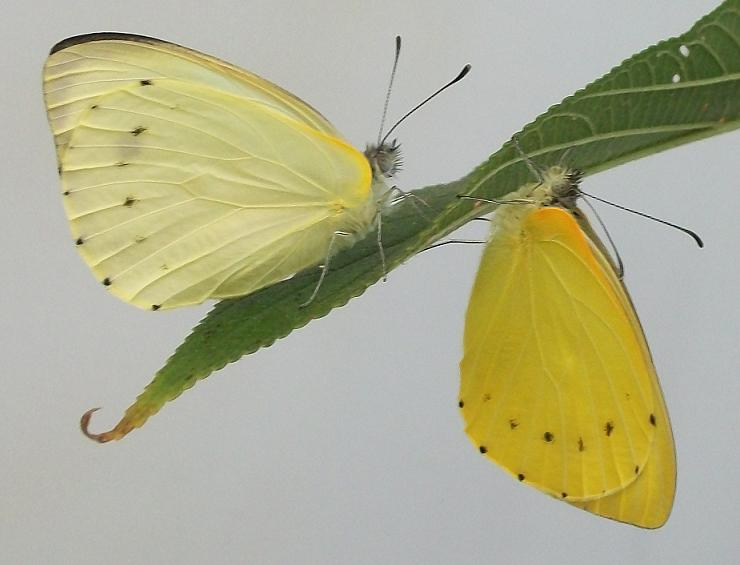
Two females of different forms viewed from the side

== Description ==
The wingspan is 40–48 mm for males and 40–52 mm for females. The upperside of the wings of males is pure white with a narrow black forewing tip and small black dots on the hindwing margin. The underside is whitish with two rows of black spots on the hindwings, with the inner row sometimes absent or incomplete. The female has several colour forms, but is usually pale yellowish white on the upper surface with heavier black markings than the male, and has a dark spot on each forewing. There is a rare female form (luteola) where the upperside is orange yellow or deep apricot. The underside of females is similar to the male but the rows of black dots are more pronounced and the base colour is pale to bright yellow. Another rare form (rubrobasalis) has orange suffusion at the base of the underside of the forewing and a creamy-yellow upperside. The dry-season form (alba) has reduced black markings. A distinguishing feature of D. pigea is that the hindwing costal has a yellow streak, unlike other Dixeia species.

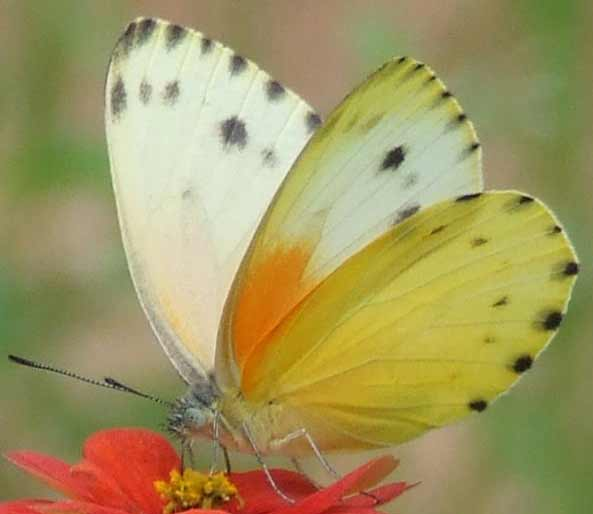
Female form rubrobasalis from Limpopo Province, South Africa

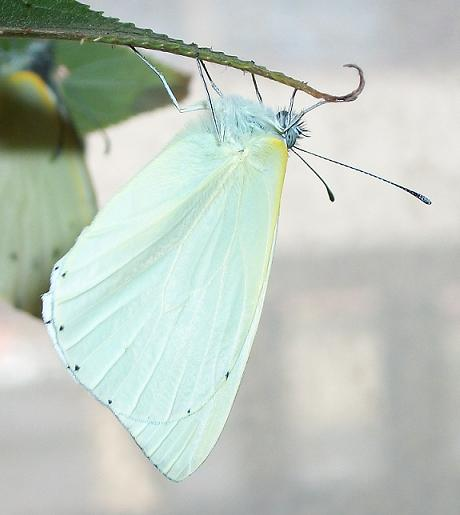
Male viewed from the side; showing the yellow streak on the hindwing

== Distribution ==
This species is found from the Eastern Cape province of South Africa through KwaZulu-Natal, Eswatini, Mpumalanga and Limpopo Province, to Mozambique, Zimbabwe, Ethiopia, DRC, Angola and Cameroon.

== Life cycle ==
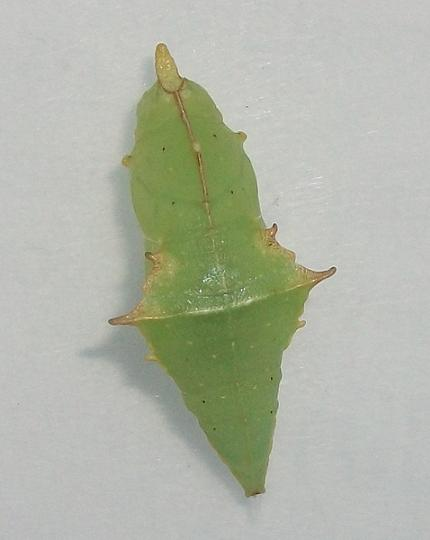
Pupa of Dixeia pigea

=== Eggs ===
Groups of tiny, elongated eggs are laid on the undersurface of the leaves of the food plants.

=== Larvae ===
The larvae are green; pale green on the back and darker green on the sides when young, and develop two rows of pale green blotches down the length of the body as they grow older. The food plants are Capparis sepiaria and Capparis tomentosa.

=== Pupae ===
The pupae have an unusual shape, with a pointed 'nose' and a notable spike on each side of the body protruding from a broad, flattened area midway down the body. There is a smaller spike both to the fore and rear of each of these larger spikes, and a small spike on each side of the body just to the rear of the head. The larger spikes resemble to some extent the double, hooked thorns on the stems of the food plant, Capparis tomentosa (see image). The pupae may be pale green, dark green or brown in colour. The wing areas show whitish or yellowish with dark spots near to hatching and the body becomes greyish.

=== Adults ===
The flight period is all year. They have been described as having a medium-fast, random flight pattern or as a rather weak, slow flying butterfly. They keep to open areas in riverine forest and thick bush or the edges of bush areas. Both sexes feed from flowers and are greatly attracted to flowering bushes exposed to the sun.

== Gallery ==
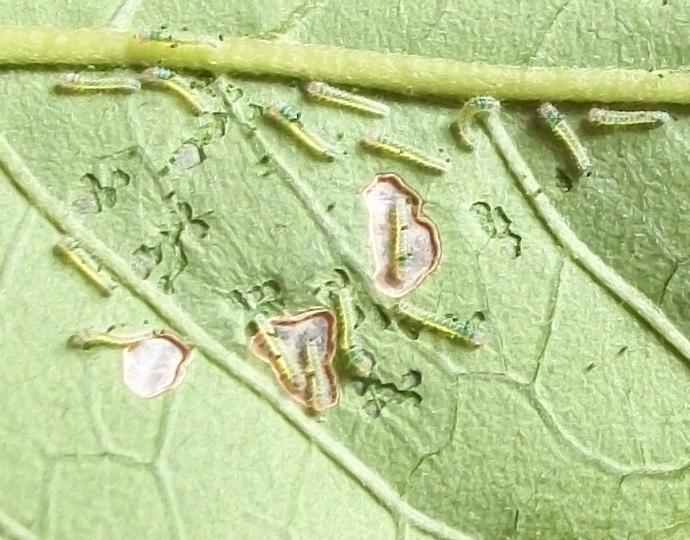
Larvae of Dixeia pigea, just a few days old

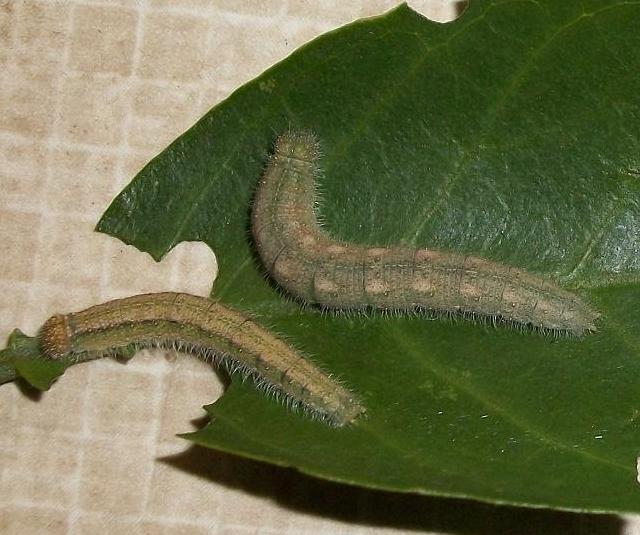
Older larvae

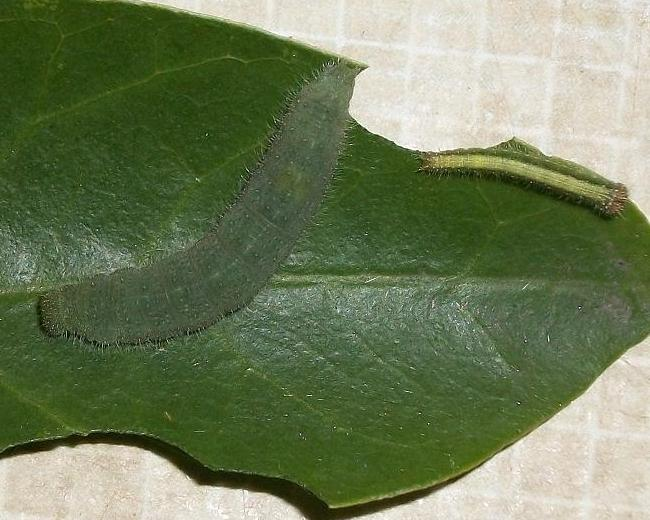
Larvae; the one on the left is near to pupating

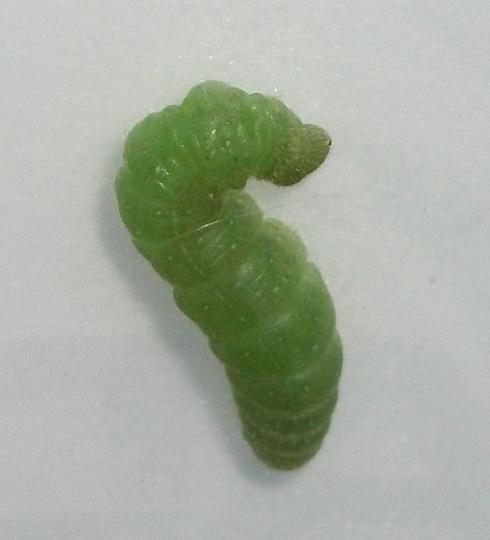
Larva about to pupate

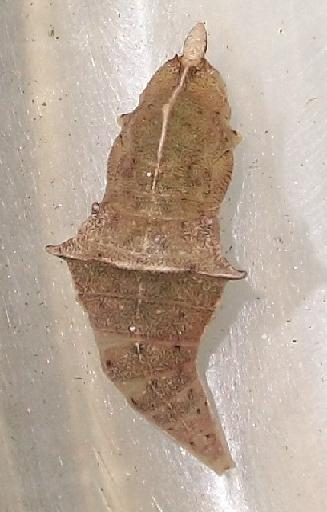
Brown pupa

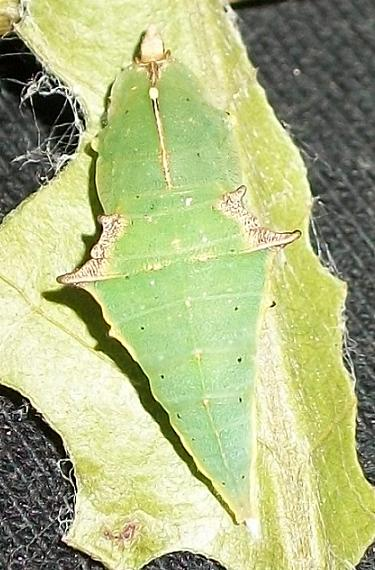
Green pupa

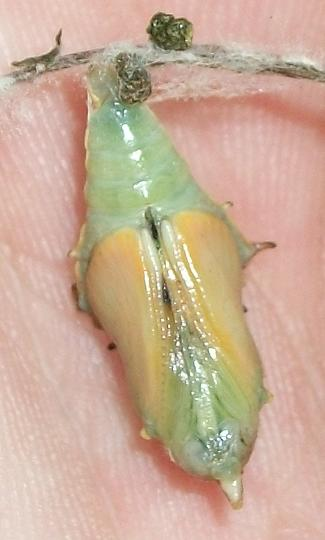
Underside of female pupa; yellow wings showing through

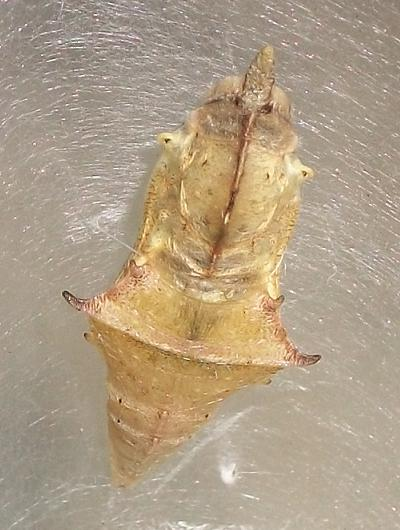
Pupa near to hatching

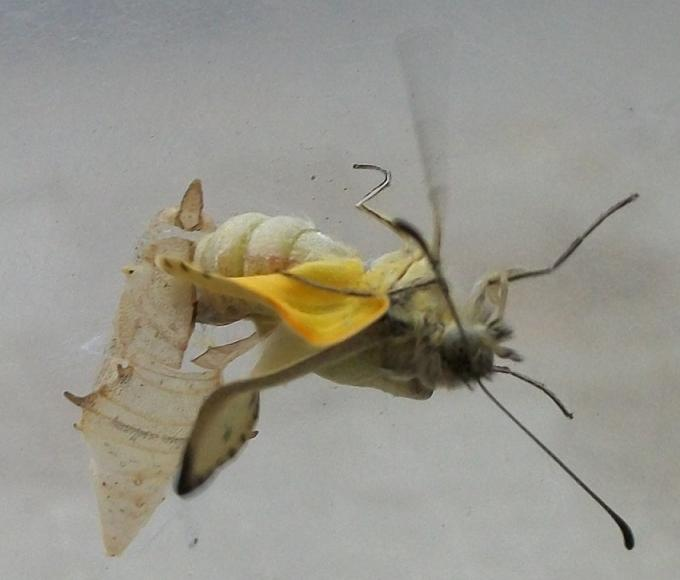
Female hatching from pupa

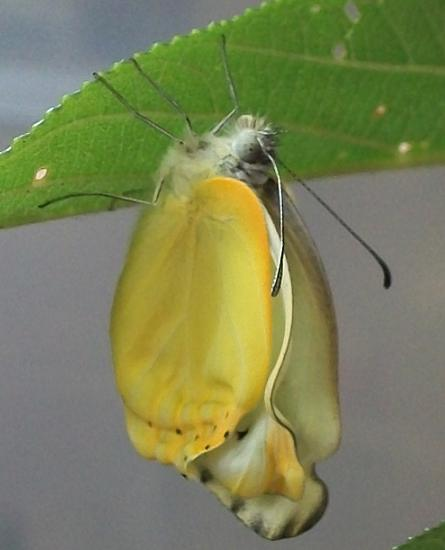
Female extending wings after hatching

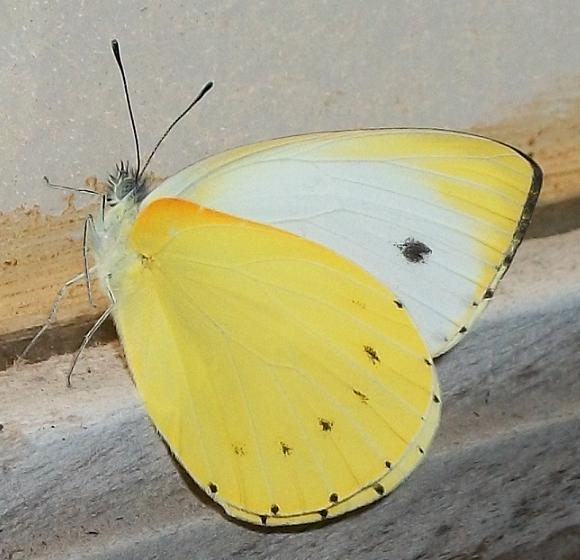
Side view of female

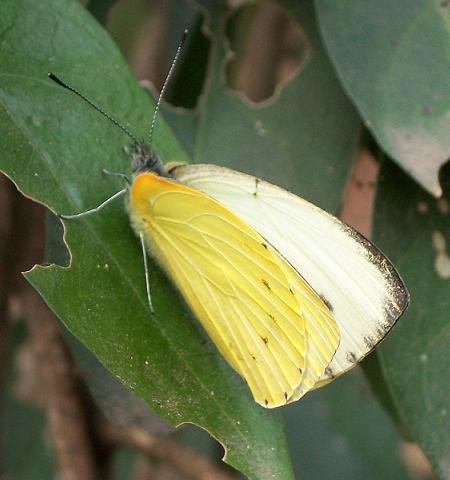
Captive raised female released onto larval food plant
