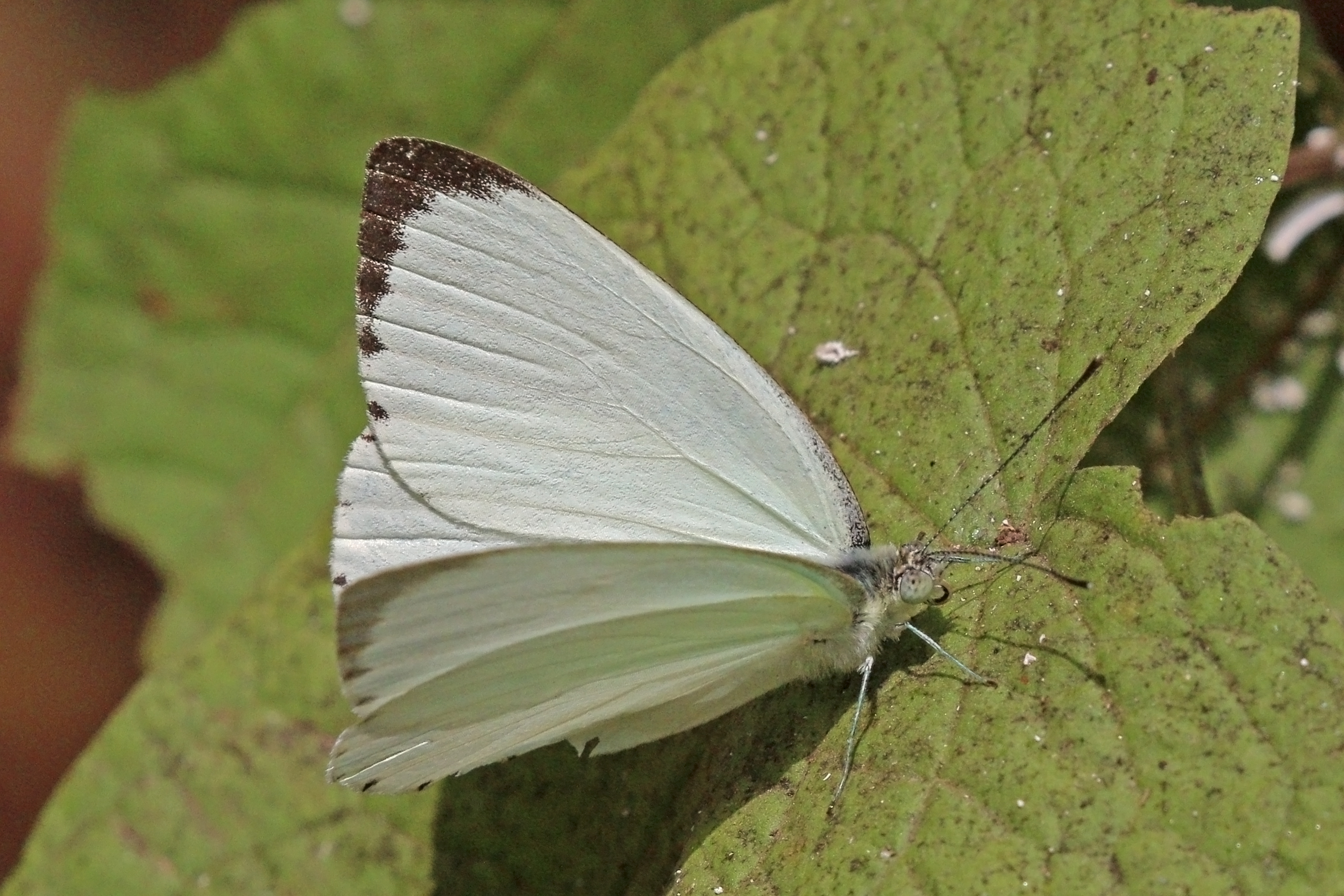
- Male D. o. orbona, Gambia

Scientific classification
- Kingdom: Animalia
- Phylum: Arthropoda
- Clade: Pancrustacea
- Class: Insecta
- Order: Lepidoptera
- Family: Pieridae
- Genus: Dixeia
- Species: D. orbona

Binomial name
- Dixeia orbona (Geyer, [1837])

Synonyms
- Mylothris orbona Geyer, 1837; Pinacopteryx vidua Butler, 1900; Pieris liliana ab. nigricans Aurivillius, 1910; Pieris abyssinibia Strand, 1911; Pinacopteryx vidua f. primulina Joicey and Talbot, 1921; Pieris griseovenata Neustetter, 1927; Pieris orbona vidua f. aurantium Ungemach, 1932; Pieris orbona vidua f. rubescens Ungemach, 1932; Pieris orbona vidua f. albida Ungemach, 1932; Dixeia orbona vidua f. semialba Talbot, 1943; Dixeia orbona vidua f. semiochracea Talbot, 1943

= Dixeia orbona =

Creamy small white

Species of butterfly

Dixeia orbona, the creamy small white, is a butterfly in the family Pieridae. It is found in Senegal, the Gambia, Guinea-Bissau, Burkina Faso, Ghana, Nigeria, Cameroon, Sudan, Ethiopia, the Democratic Republic of the Congo, Uganda, Kenya and Tanzania. The habitat consists of open woodland and open montane forests, particularly forest-grassland mosaic.

The larvae feed on Capparis species.

== Subspecies ==
- Dixeia orbona orbona (Senegal, the Gambia, Guinea-Bissau, Burkina Faso, northern Ghana, northern Nigeria, northern Cameroon)
- Dixeia orbona vidua (Butler, 1900) (Sudan, Ethiopia, Democratic Republic of the Congo, Uganda, Kenya, Tanzania)

Torben Larsen developed a species numbering system for his 2005 publication Butterflies of West Africa. The nominate subspecies is #79. The 'Larsen' numbers have since been used with permission in A Sharp Eye on Butterflies of Ghana.
