= Dixeia dixeyi =

Scientific classification
- Kingdom: Animalia
- Phylum: Arthropoda
- Class: Insecta
- Order: Lepidoptera
- Family: Pieridae
- Genus: Dixeia
- Species: D. dixeyi

Binomial name
- Dixeia dixeyi (Neave, 1904)

Synonyms
- Pinacopteryx dixeyi Neave, 1904; Appias yambo Ungemach, 1932; Appias yambo minuta Ungemach, 1932

Species of butterfly

Dixeia dixeyi is a butterfly in the family Pieridae. It is found in western Tanzania, Uganda, the Democratic Republic of the Congo, southern Sudan and south-western Ethiopia. The habitat consists of forests and heavy woodland.
