= Dixeia leucophanes =

Spotless black-veined small white

Scientific classification
- Kingdom: Animalia
- Phylum: Arthropoda
- Class: Insecta
- Order: Lepidoptera
- Family: Pieridae
- Genus: Dixeia
- Species: D. leucophanes

Binomial name
- Dixeia leucophanes Vári, 1976

Species of butterfly

Dixeia leucophanes, the spotless black-veined small white, is a butterfly in the family Pieridae. It is found in Zambia, Mozambique and Zimbabwe. The habitat consists of forests and heavy woodland.
