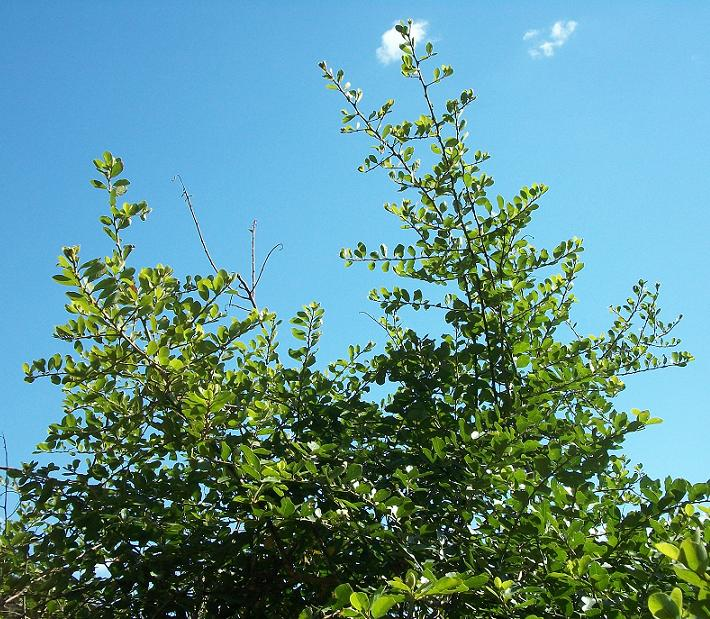
- Capparis tomentosa growing as a shrub in Amanzimtoti, South Africa

Scientific classification
- Kingdom: Plantae
- Clade: Tracheophytes
- Clade: Angiosperms
- Clade: Eudicots
- Clade: Rosids
- Order: Brassicales
- Family: Capparaceae
- Genus: Capparis
- Species: C. tomentosa

Binomial name
- Capparis tomentosa Lam.

Synonyms
- Capparis corymbifera E.Mey. ex Sond.; Capparis polymorpha A.Rich.; Capparis venenata Schinz; Capparis hypericoides Hochst.; Capparis persicifolia A.Rich.; Capparis biloba Hutch. & Dalziel; Capparis alexandrae Chiov.; Capparis verdickii De Wild.; Capparis volkensii Gilg

= Capparis tomentosa =

Species of fruit and plant

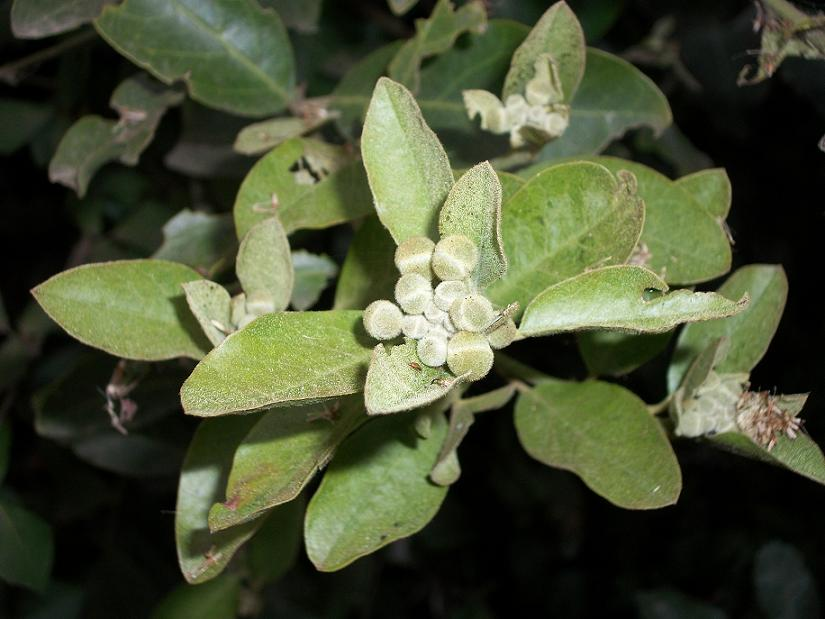
Buds and leaves of Capparis tomentosa

Capparis tomentosa, the woolly caper bush or African caper, is a plant in the family Capparaceae and is native to Africa.

== Distribution ==
Found in bushveld and forest from the Eastern Cape of South Africa, through KwaZulu-Natal, Mpumalanga, Limpopo Province, Mozambique, Botswana, Namibia and into tropical Africa. The northern part of the range extends from Senegal to Eritrea, and this species is also found in the Mascarene Islands.

== Description ==
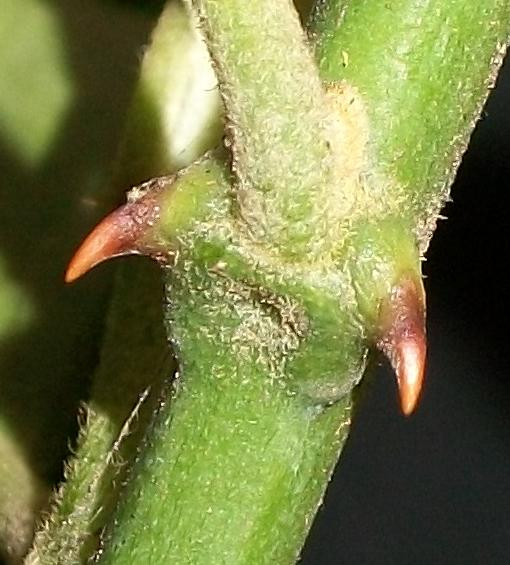
Close-up of the spines of C. tomentosa

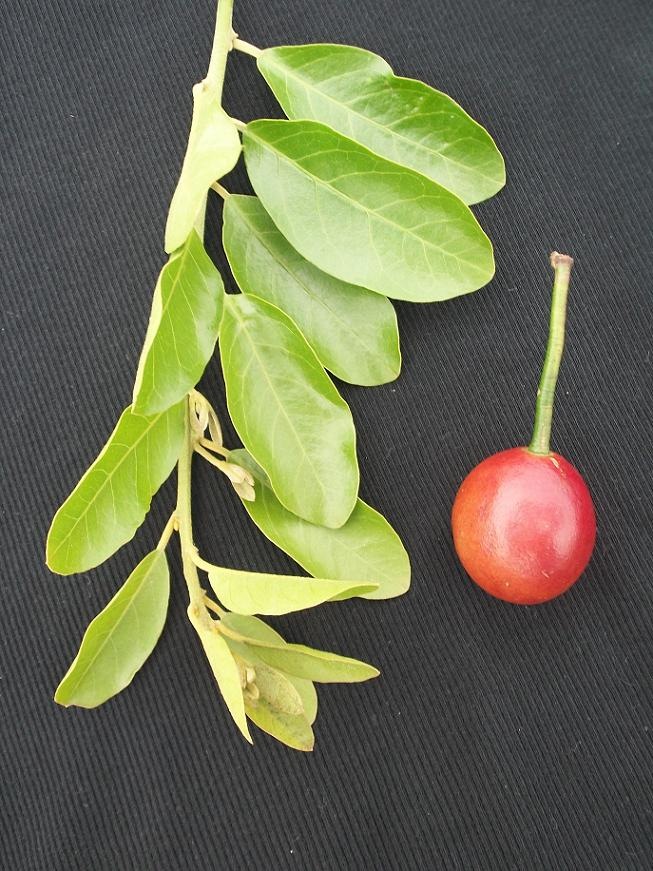
Branchlet and ripe fruit

=== Growth form ===
Mostly a robust woody climber; which in riverine vegetation may grow to the top of the canopy. It may also be a straggling shrub or small tree.

=== Stem ===
The stem has sharp, paired, hooked spines. Young stems and spines are covered in dense velvety yellow hairs.

=== Leaves ===
The leaves form between the spines and are alternate, oblong to broadly elliptic (30-80 × 15–25 mm), greyish-olive green, covered in velvet hairs (or smooth); margins entire, rolled under. The petiole is 4–12 mm long and velvety.

=== Flowers ===
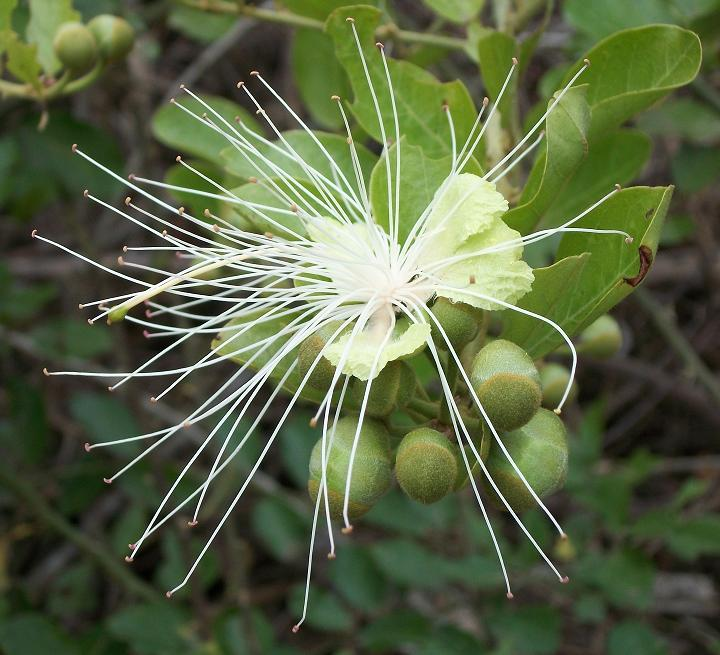
Flower of Capparis tomentosa

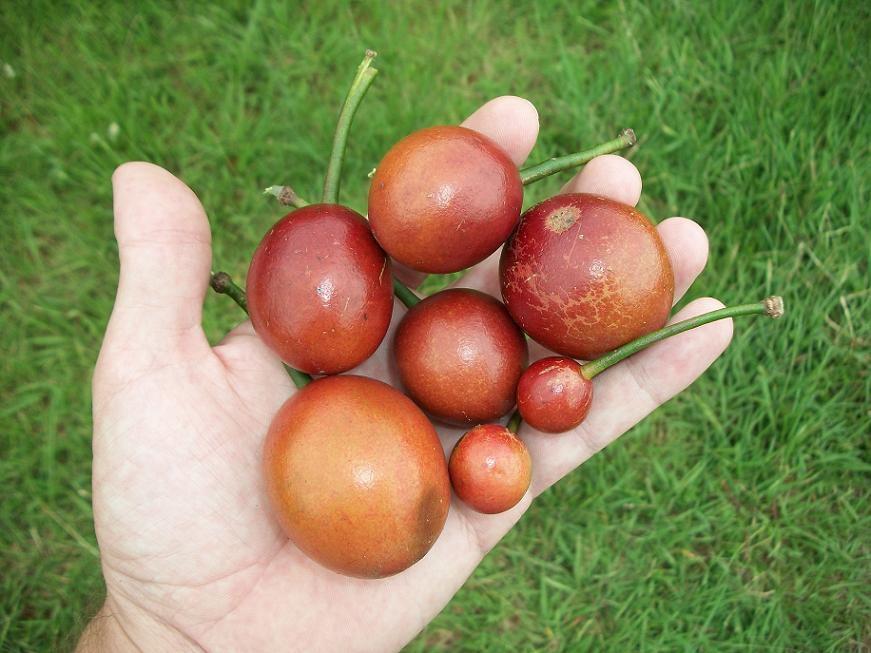
Ripe fruit

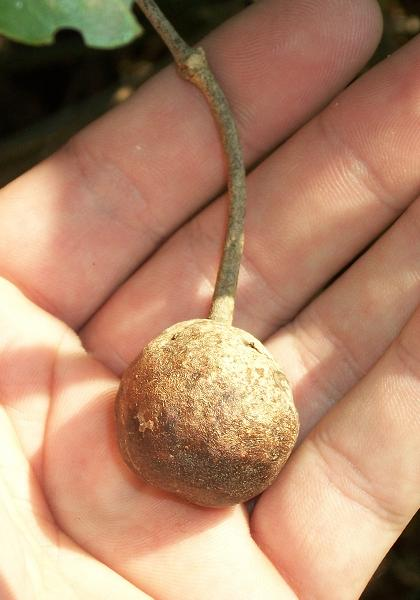
Dry fruit

The flowers form in clusters; terminally on the primary branches or on short leafy lateral branchlets or occasionally scattered in the upper leaf-axils. They are large (35 mm) and scented, with a mass of pinkish-white stamens which are each 20–35 mm in length and may be crimson coloured at the base. The sepals are boat shaped and 8–10 mm long. The petals are whitish; 15–25 mm long and 7–10 mm wide.

=== Fruit ===
The fruits hang from a long (25–50 mm) stalk-like branch called a gynophore. They are up to 40 mm (50 mm) in diameter; shiny green at first, ripening to pink or orange. The fruit contain many seeds embedded in a pinkish flesh. Dried-out, emptied fruit may hang on the plant for some time.

== Toxins ==
Desert sheep, zebu calves and Nubian goats were fed varying amounts of dry Capparis tomentosa leaves and died or were killed in extremis at various times after the commencement of dosing. Signs of Capparis poisoning in the sheep and calves were; weakness of the hind limbs, staggering, swaying, flexion of the fetlock and phalangeal joints, pain in the sacral region, inappetence and recumbency. There was a decrease in the level of total protein and calcium and an increase of glutamic oxaloacetic transaminase (GOT), ammonia, sodium and potassium in serum. The main pathological changes were vacuolation of the neurons and axons in the spinal cord, with necrosis of the centrilobular hepatocytes and renal convoluted tubules and glomeruli. In Capparis-fed goats, anaemia developed and the results of kidney and liver function tests were correlated with clinical abnormalities and pathologic changes. The prominent features of toxicity were inappetence, locomotor disturbances, paresis especially of the hind limbs and recumbency. Lesions comprised perineuronal vacuolation in the gray matter of the spinal cord at the sacral region, centrilobular hepatocellular necrosis, degeneration of the renal proximal convoluted and collecting tubules, serous atrophy of the cardiac fat and renal pelvis and straw-coloured fluid in serious cavities. One goat which was receiving Capparis stem at 2.5 g/kg on an every other day basis for 8 days, developed signs of toxicosis, but recovered following cessation of plant administration.

Isolated compounds were identified in Capparis tomentosa as 24-ethylcholestan-5-en-3-ol a phytosterol and a dipeptide derivative, N-benzoylphenylalanylaninol acetate.

== Human uses ==
This species has traditional medicinal and magical uses in Africa. Among others it is used as a remedy for diarrhea, swelling and water retention. It is a decorative plant in gardens and can be used for hedging; being suitable as a security barrier because of the hooked spines. The fruit may sometimes be eaten by people.

The alkaloid Stachydrine has been identified in Capparis tomentosa.

== Ecological significance ==
Several species of butterfly use this plant as a larval food plant, including; Belenois gidica, Dixeia pigea, Eronia leda and Colotis evenina. Game animals browse the leaves and monkeys and bushpigs eat the fruit.
