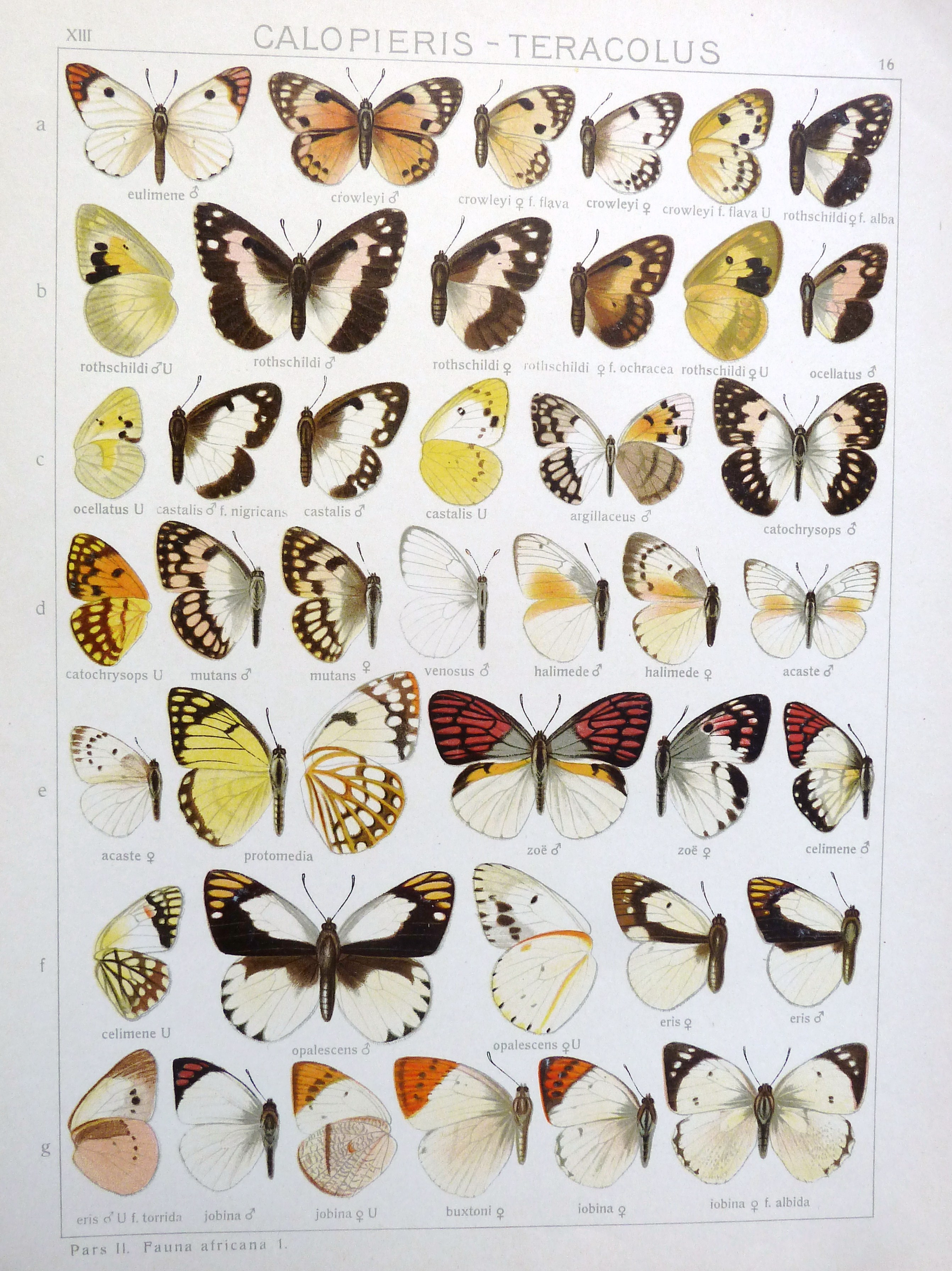

Scientific classification
- Kingdom: Animalia
- Phylum: Arthropoda
- Clade: Pancrustacea
- Class: Insecta
- Order: Lepidoptera
- Family: Pieridae
- Tribe: Teracolini
- Genus: Calopieris; Aurivillius, 1898
- Species: C. eulimene

Binomial name
- Calopieris eulimene (Klug, 1829)

Synonyms
- Pontia eulimene Klug, 1829

= Calopieris =

Monotypic butterfly genus in family Pieridae

Calopieris is a genus of butterflies in the family Pieridae. It consists of only one species, Calopieris eulimene, which is found in Egypt (Gebel Elba Protected Area), Chad, Sudan, the Red Sea coast, western Saudi Arabia and Yemen.
