= La Vagabonde =

La Vagabonde may refer to:

- The Vagabond (novel), a 1910 novel by the French writer Colette
- La Vagabonde (trail), a cycling route (Route Verte) in Quebec
- La Vagabonde, catamaran sailed by creators of YouTube channel Sailing La Vagabonde

== See also ==
- Le Vagabond or The Littlest Hobo, a Canadian film and television series
- Vagabond (disambiguation)
