= Meander River =

Meander River may refer to:

- Meander River (also Maeander), a historical name for the Büyük Menderes River in Turkey
- Küçük Menderes ("Little Meander"), a river located south of İzmir, Turkey
- Meander River (Tasmania), a river of Tasmania, Australia
- Meander River, Alberta, a settlement in Alberta, Canada

== See also ==
- Meander (disambiguation)
