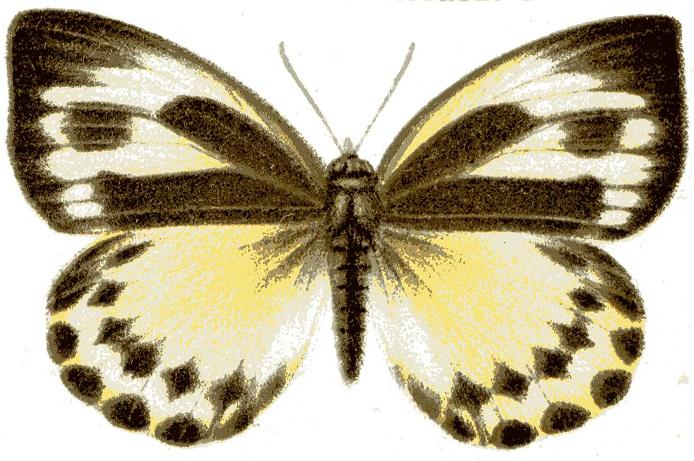
- Female
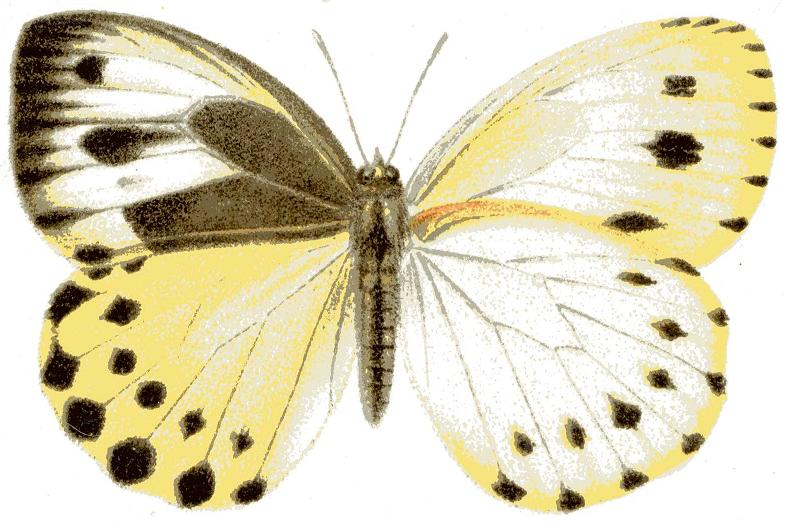
- Female, upperside and underside

Scientific classification
- Kingdom: Animalia
- Phylum: Arthropoda
- Clade: Pancrustacea
- Class: Insecta
- Order: Lepidoptera
- Family: Pieridae
- Genus: Dixeia
- Species: D. capricornus

Binomial name
- Dixeia capricornus (Ward, 1871)

Synonyms
- Pieris capricornus Ward, 1871; Pieris adultera Plötz, 1880; Pieris capricornus nusprica Suffert, 1904; Dixeia cebron f. aurantiaca Talbot, 1943; Dixeia capricornus f. signata Talbot, 1943; Dixeia capricornus capricornus alba Bernardi, 1961; Dixeia capricornus capricornus ochracea Bernardi, 1961; Pieris falkensteinii Dewitz, 1879; Tachyris lindnerii Dewitz, 1879

= Dixeia capricornus =

Capricorn white

Species of butterfly

Dixeia capricornus, the Capricorn white, is a butterfly in the family Pieridae. It is found in Ivory Coast, Ghana, Benin, Nigeria, Cameroon, Gabon, the Republic of the Congo and Angola. The habitat consists of forests.

== Subspecies ==
- Dixeia capricornus capricornus (eastern Ivory Coast, Ghana, Benin, southern Nigeria, western and central Cameroon)
- Dixeia capricornus falkensteinii (Dewitz, 1879) (southern Cameroon, Gabon, Congo, Angola)

Torben Larsen developed a species numbering system for his 2005 publication Butterflies of West Africa. The nominate subspecies is #81. The 'Larsen' numbers have since been used with permission in A Sharp Eye on Butterflies of Ghana.
