= Dixeia piscicollis =

Scientific classification
- Kingdom: Animalia
- Phylum: Arthropoda
- Class: Insecta
- Order: Lepidoptera
- Family: Pieridae
- Genus: Dixeia
- Species: D. piscicollis

Binomial name
- Dixeia piscicollis Pinhey, 1972

Species of butterfly

Dixeia piscicollis is a butterfly in the family Pieridae. It is found on Sao Tome and Principe.
