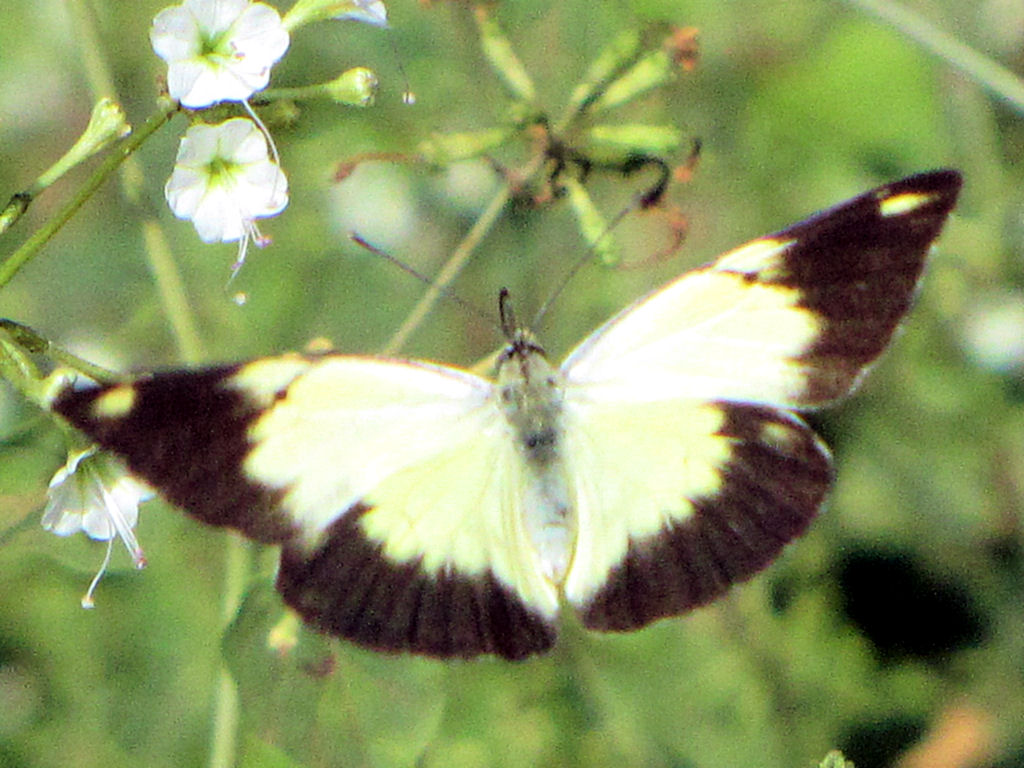
- Vine-leaf vagrant (Eronia cleodora), Lake Manyara National Park, Tanzania

Scientific classification
- Kingdom: Animalia
- Phylum: Arthropoda
- Clade: Pancrustacea
- Class: Insecta
- Order: Lepidoptera
- Family: Pieridae
- Subfamily: Pierinae
- Tribe: Teracolini
- Genus: Eronia; Hübner, [1823]

= Eronia =

Butterfly genus in family Pieridae

Eronia, commonly called vagrants, is a genus of butterflies of the subfamily Pierinae found mainly in Africa. For other butterflies called "vagrants" see genus Nepheronia.

== Species ==
- Eronia cleodora Hübner, 1823 – vine-leaf vagrant
- Eronia leda (Boisduval, 1847) – autumn leaf vagrant or orange-and-lemon (butterfly)
