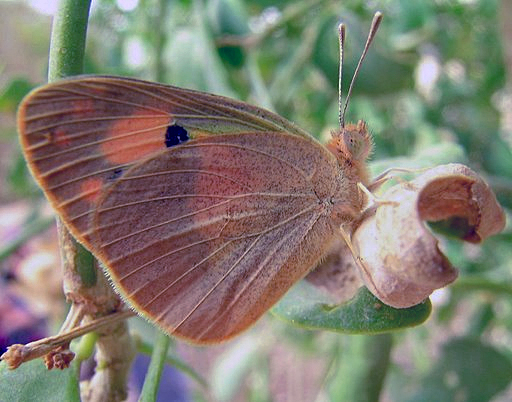
- Colotis phisadia

Scientific classification
- Kingdom: Animalia
- Phylum: Arthropoda
- Class: Insecta
- Order: Lepidoptera
- Family: Pieridae
- Subfamily: Pierinae
- Tribe: Teracolini; Reuter, 1896

Genera
- Colotis; Eronia; Ixias; Teracolus; Calopieris; Pinacopteryx; Gideona

Synonyms
- Colotini

= Teracolini =

Tribe of butterflies

Teracolini is a tribe of pierid butterflies in the subfamily Pierinae.
