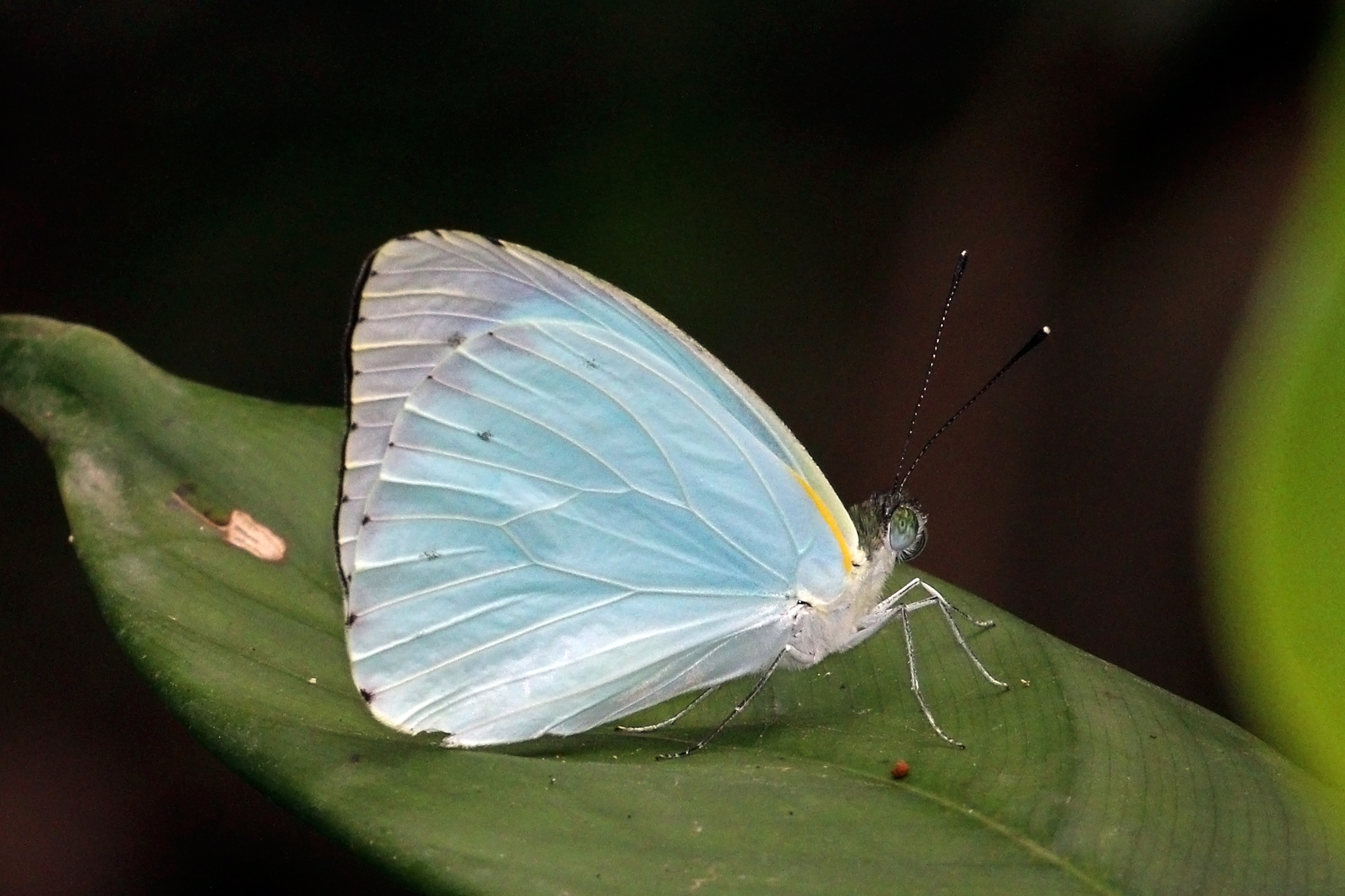
- male N. t. thalassina Bobiri Forest, Ghana

Scientific classification
- Kingdom: Animalia
- Phylum: Arthropoda
- Clade: Pancrustacea
- Class: Insecta
- Order: Lepidoptera
- Family: Pieridae
- Genus: Nepheronia
- Species: N. thalassina

Binomial name
- Nepheronia thalassina (Boisduval, 1836)

Synonyms
- Pieris thalassina Boisduval, 1836; Eronia thalassina sinalata Suffert, 1904; Eronia thalassina f. hesione Stoneham, 1957; Eronia thalassina f. proserpina Stoneham, 1957; Eronia verulanus Ward, 1871

= Nepheronia thalassina =

Cambridge vagrant

Species of butterfly

Nepheronia thalassina, the Cambridge vagrant, is a butterfly of the family Pieridae. It is found in afrotropical Africa.

The wingspan is 50–55 mm for males and 55–60 mm for females. Adults are on the wing year-round, peaking from February to May.

The larvae feed on Hippocrates obtusifolia, Hippocrates africana, and Jasminium spp.

== Subspecies ==
- N. t. thalassina (Boisduval, 1836) (Senegal, the Gambia, Guinea, Sierra Leone, Liberia, Ivory Coast, Ghana, Togo, Benin, Nigeria)
- N. t. sinalata (Suffert, 1904) (Sudan, Ethiopia, Uganda, Kenya, Tanzania, Malawi, Zambia, eastern and northern Zimbabwe, northern Botswana, northern Namibia, Eswatini, South Africa)
- N. t. verulanus (Ward, 1871) (Cameroon, Congo, Democratic Republic of the Congo, western Uganda, northern Angola, northern Zambia)

Torben Larsen developed a species numbering system for his 2005 publication Butterflies of West Africa. The nominate subspecies is #46. The 'Larsen' numbers have since been used with permission in A Sharp Eye on Butterflies of Ghana.
