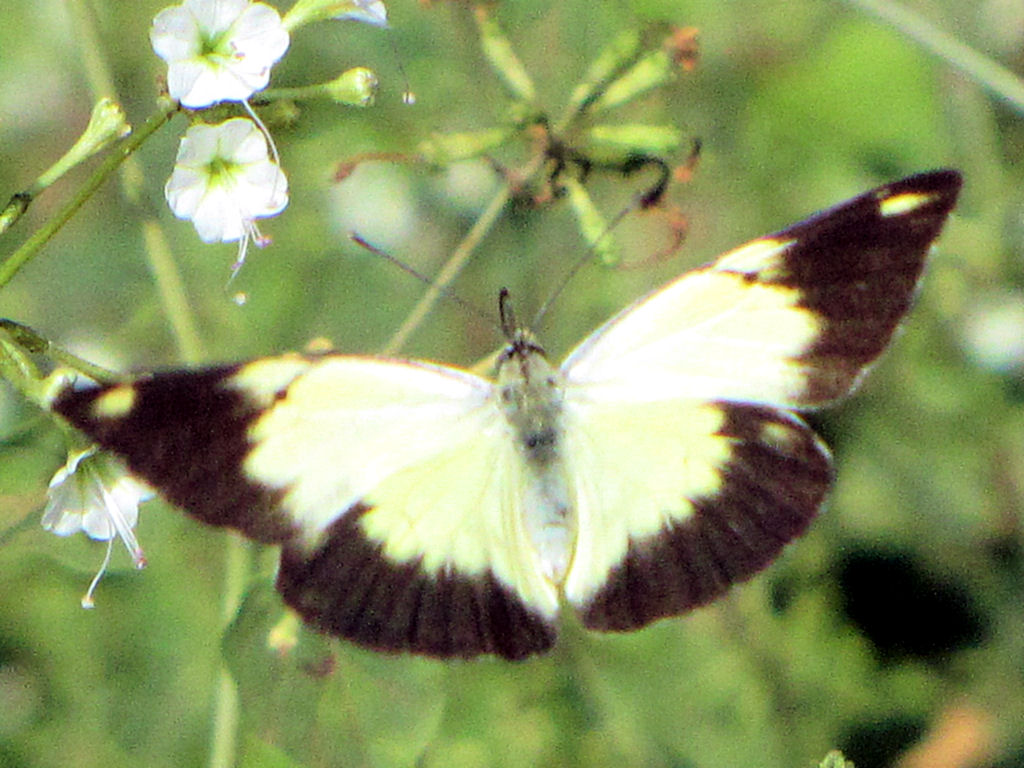
- Lake Manyara National Park, Tanzania
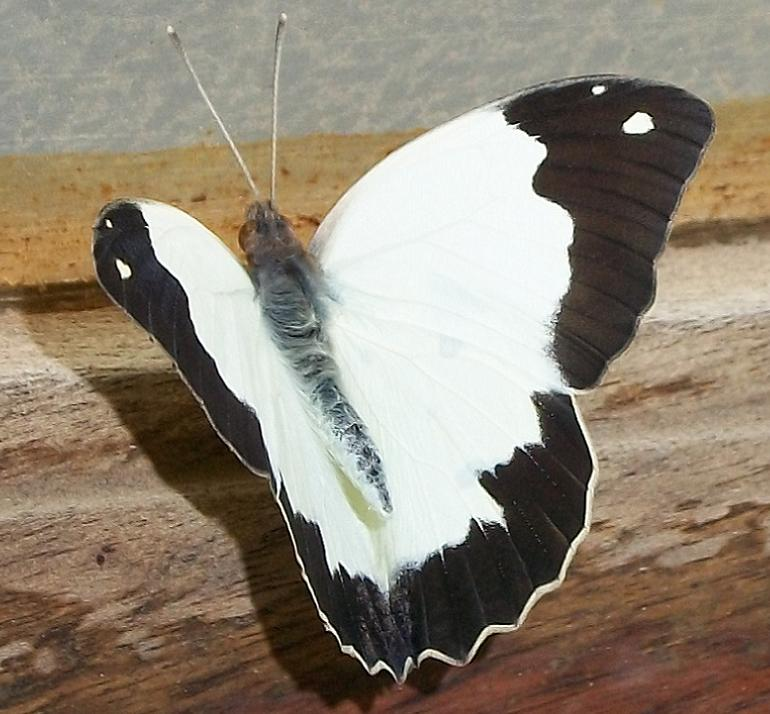
- Captive raised, Amanzimtoti, South Africa

Scientific classification
- Kingdom: Animalia
- Phylum: Arthropoda
- Class: Insecta
- Order: Lepidoptera
- Family: Pieridae
- Genus: Eronia
- Species: E. cleodora

Binomial name
- Eronia cleodora Hübner, [1823]

Synonyms
- Eronia erxia Hewitson, 1867; Eronia cleodora f. semipunctata Le Doux, 1923; Eronia cleodora f. punctata Le Doux, 1923; Eronia cleodora f. erxia ab. unipuncta Dufrane, 1947; Eronia dilatata Butler, 1888; Eronia cleodora var. latimarginata Weymer, 1892; Eronia cleodora f. dorothea Stoneham, 1957

= Eronia cleodora =

Vine-leaf vagrant

Species of butterfly

Eronia cleodora, the vine-leaf vagrant, is a butterfly of the family Pieridae. It is found throughout Africa.

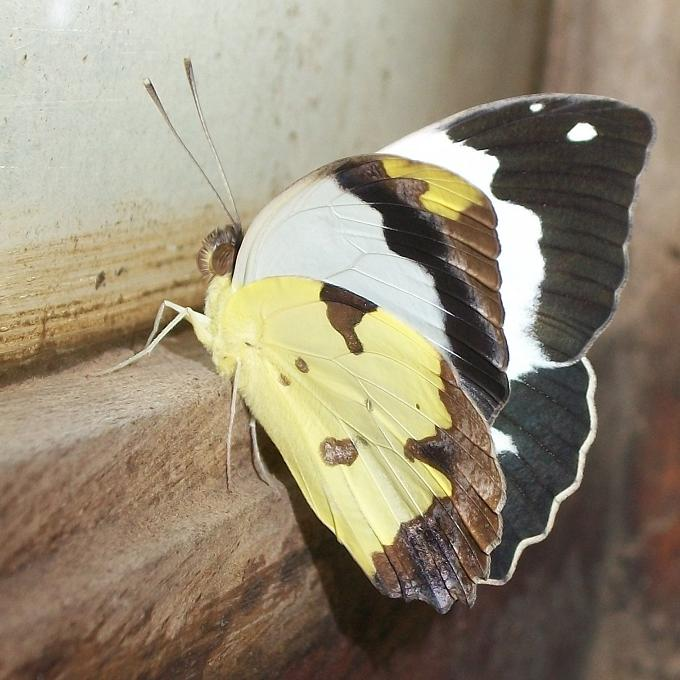
Side view of captive raised individual

The wingspan is 45–60 mm for males and 50–62 mm for females. Adults are on wing year-round in warmer areas with peaks in spring and late summer.

The larvae feed on Capparis fascicularis.

== Subspecies ==
- Eronia cleodora cleodora (southern and eastern Africa)
- Eronia cleodora dilatata Butler, 1888 (coast of Kenya and Tanzania)
