= Vagabond (boat) =

Vagabond is a yacht specifically designed to sail in icy waters. In 2001, she was the first boat to go through the North-East passage without wintering. In 2002, she came back to France via the North-west Passage, completing the first circumnavigation around the Arctic Ocean. Vagabond now serves as a logistic support for scientific expeditions in the Arctic.
