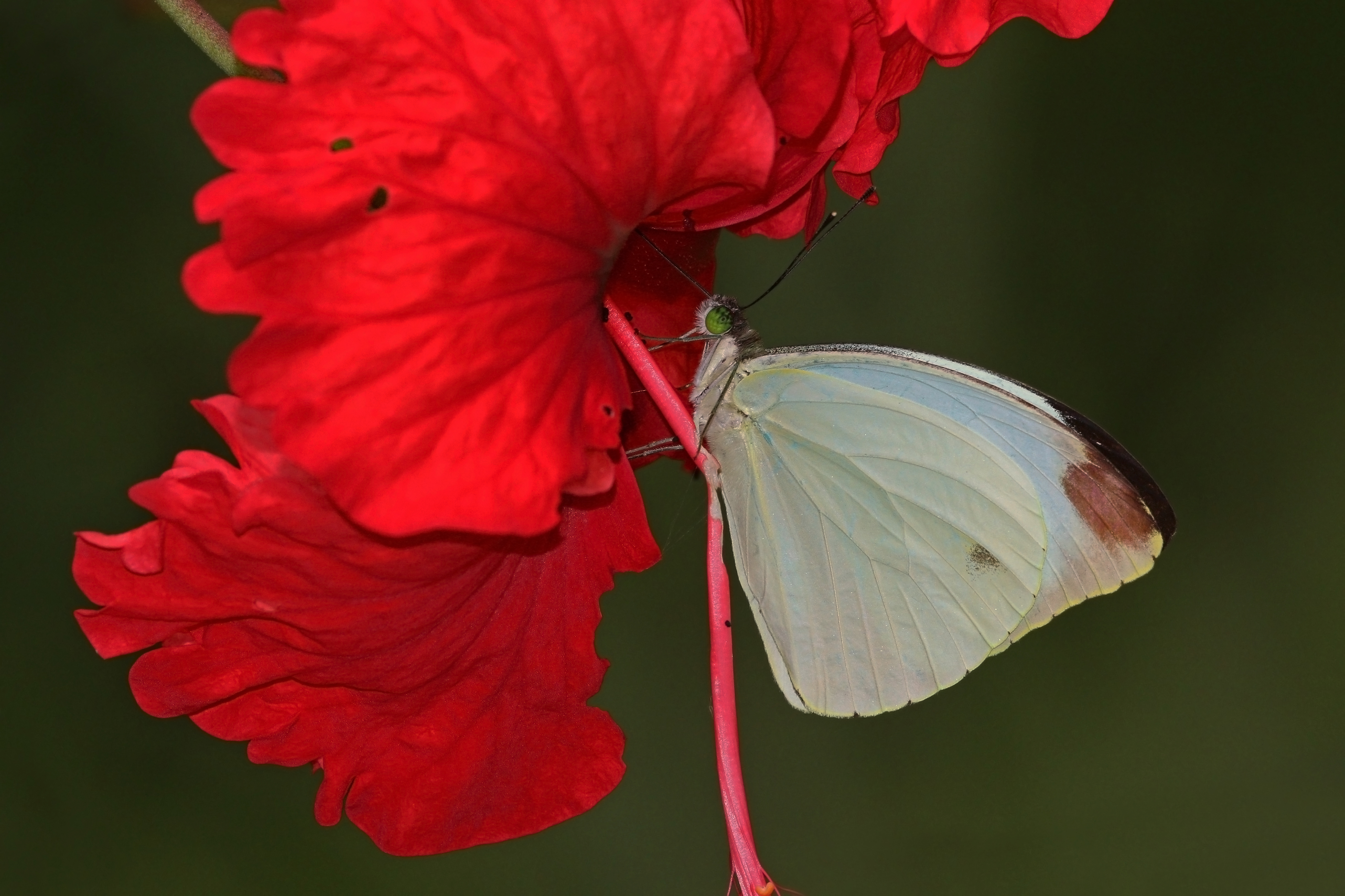
- male N. a. argia Bobiri Forest, Ghana

Scientific classification
- Kingdom: Animalia
- Phylum: Arthropoda
- Clade: Pancrustacea
- Class: Insecta
- Order: Lepidoptera
- Family: Pieridae
- Genus: Nepheronia
- Species: N. argia

Binomial name
- Nepheronia argia (Fabricius, 1775)

Synonyms
- Papilio argia Fabricius, 1775; Papilio cassiopea Cramer, 1779; Pieris idotea Boisduval, 1836; Eronia argia ab. semiflava Aurivillius, 1895; Eronia argia ab. mixta Aurivillius, 1895; Eronia argia ab. sulphurea Aurivillius, 1895; Eronia argia virescens Suffert, 1904; Eronia argia var. castelaini Schouteden, 1912; Nepheronia argia hollandi Fox, 1963; Nepheronia argia argia aurantiaca Bernardi, 1968; Nepheronia argia f. mongala Berger, 1981; Eronia argia f. euterpe Stoneham, 1957; Erone argia f. calliope Stoneham, 1957; Eronia argia f. erato Stoneham, 1957; Eronia argia giara Suffert, 1904; Eronia usambara Aurivillius, 1907; Eronia varia Trimen, 1864; Eronia argia aurora Suffert, 1904; Nepheronia argia f. oraria van Son, 1949; Nepheronia argia f. hemicrocea van Son, 1949

= Nepheronia argia =

Large vagrant

Species of butterfly

Nepheronia argia, the large vagrant, is a butterfly of the family Pieridae. It is found throughout Africa.

The wingspan is 50–65 mm for males and 48–70 mm for females. Adults are on wing year-round in warmer areas with peaks in late summer and autumn.

The larvae feed on Hippocratea longipetolata, Cassipurea ruwenzorensis, and Ritchiea species.

== Subspecies ==
- N. a. argia (Fabricius, 1775) (Senegal, Gambia, Guinea-Bissau, Guinea, Sierra Leone, Liberia, Ivory Coast, Ghana, Togo, Nigeria, Cameroon, Equatorial Guinea, Congo, Democratic Republic of the Congo, Angola, Sudan, northern Uganda)
- N. a. argolisia (Stoneham, 1957) (Uganda, western Kenya, western Tanzania, north-western Zambia)
- N. a. mhondana (Suffert, 1904) (eastern Kenya, Tanzania, Zambia, Malawi, eastern Zimbabwe, central and northern Mozambique)
- N. a. varia (Trimen, 1864) (South Africa)
- N. a. variegata Henning, 1994 (southern Mozambique, South Africa, Eswatini)

Torben Larsen developed a species numbering system for his 2005 publication Butterflies of West Africa. The nominate subspecies is #45. The 'Larsen' numbers have since been used with permission in A Sharp Eye on Butterflies of Ghana.

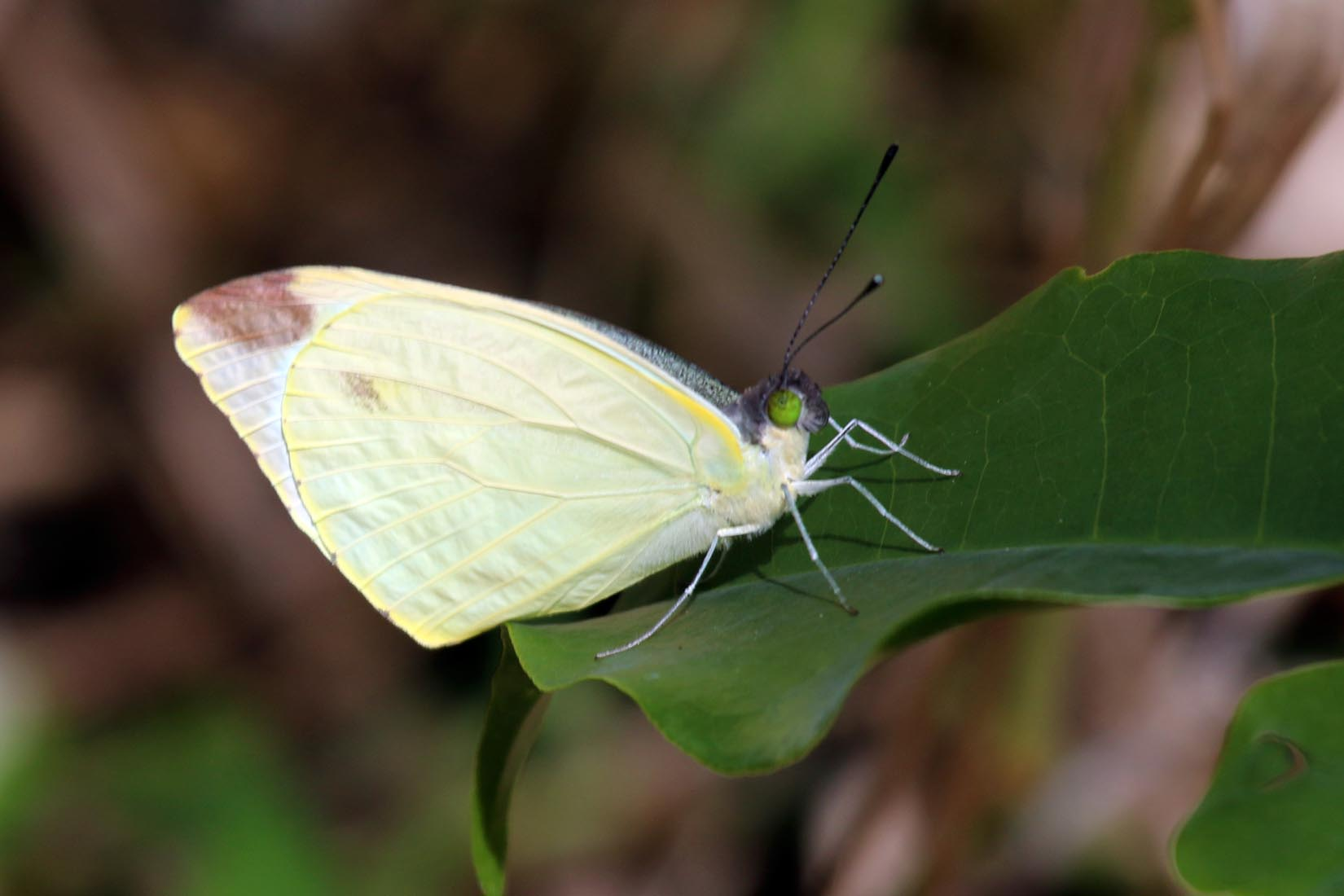
Male N. a. varia, iSimangaliso Wetland Park, KwaZulu-Natal, South Africa

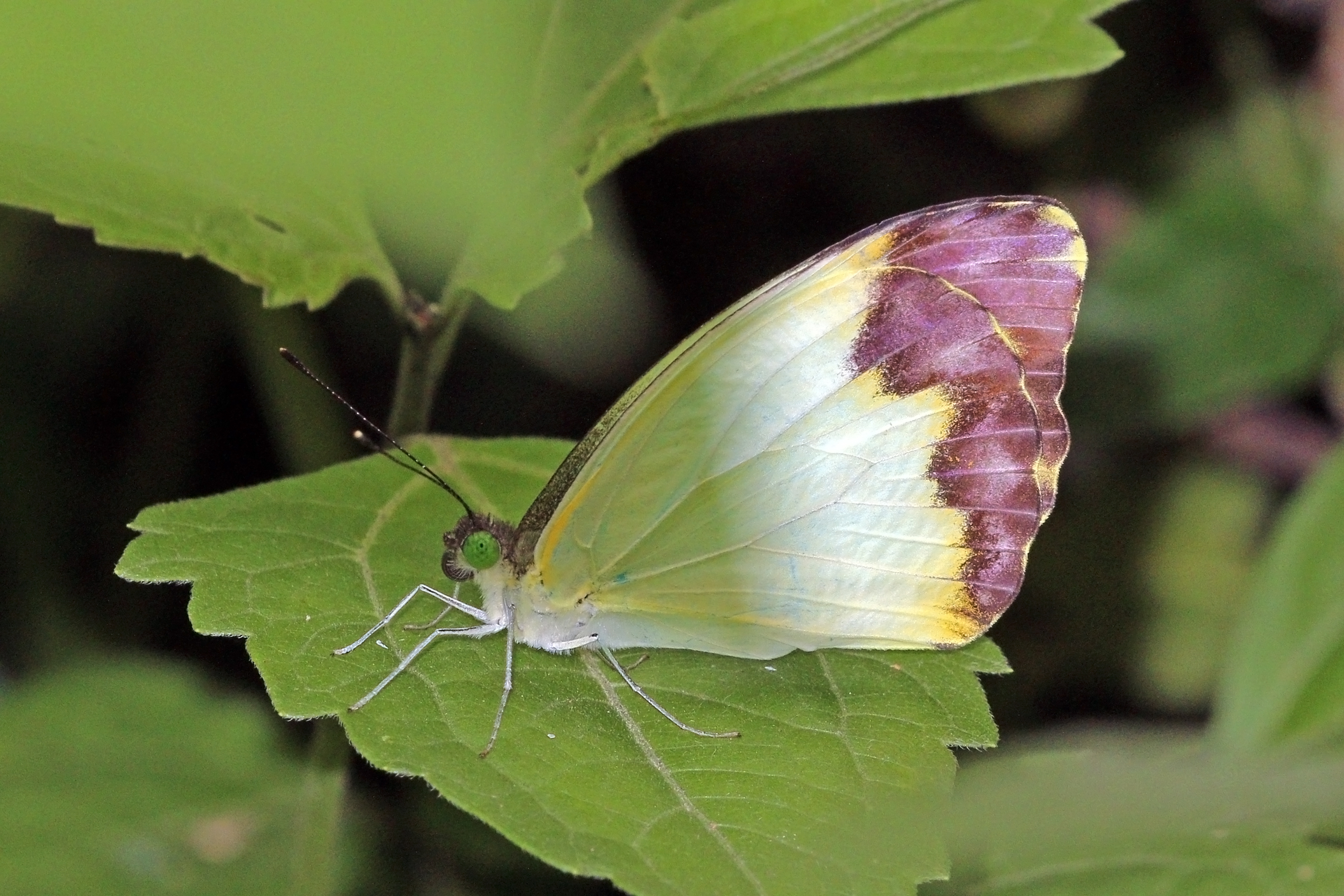
Female N. a. argia, Bobiri Forest, Ghana
