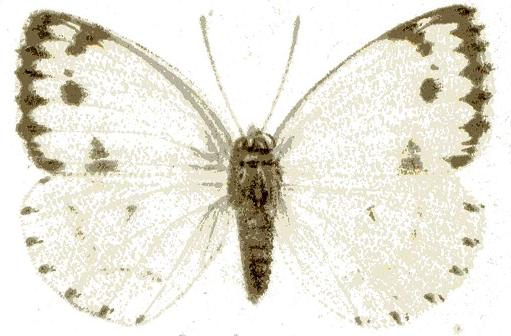
- Female

Scientific classification
- Kingdom: Animalia
- Phylum: Arthropoda
- Class: Insecta
- Order: Lepidoptera
- Family: Pieridae
- Genus: Dixeia
- Species: D. charina

Binomial name
- Dixeia charina (Boisduval, [1836])

Synonyms
- Pieris charina Boisduval, [1836]; Pinacopteryx nigropunctata Sharpe, 1890; Pieris anactorie Doubleday, 1842; Pieris gerda dagera Suffert, 1904; Pieris liliana anali Suffert, 1904; Belenois liliana Grose-Smith, 1889; Pinacopteryx gerda Grose-Smith and Kirby, 1893; Dixeia doxo liliana f. transiens Talbot, 1943; Dixeia doxo liliana f. immaculata Talbot, 1943; Dixeia doxo liliana f. ochreata Talbot, 1943; Pinacopteryx lambertoni Le Cerf, 1921; Pinacopteryx narena Grose-Smith, 1898; Pinacopteryx liliana pulverulenta Dixey, 1929; Dixeia doxo septentrionalis Bernardi, 1958; Pieris simana Hopffer, 1855

= Dixeia charina =

African small white

Species of butterfly

Dixeia charina, the African small white, is a butterfly in the family Pieridae and is native to southeastern Africa.

The wingspan is 34–40 mm in males and 36–42 mm in females. Its flight period is year-round.

Larvae feed on Capparis citrifolia and Capparis sepiaria.

== Subspecies ==
Listed alphabetically:

- D. c. charina (southern Mozambique, South Africa, Eswatini)
- D. c. dagera (Suffert, 1904) (Tanzania)
- D. c. liliana (Grose-Smith, 1889) (eastern and coastal Kenya, northern Tanzania)
- D. c. narena (Grose-Smith, 1898) (Madagascar)
- D. c. pulverulenta (Dixey, 1929) (Kenya)
- D. c. septentrionalis Bernardi, 1958 (eastern and northern Ethiopia)
- D. c. simana Hopffer, 1855 (northern Mozambique)
