= Vagabond (disambiguation) =

A vagabond is a person who wanders from place to place without a permanent home or regular work.

(The) Vagabond or Vagabonds may also refer to:

== Literature ==
- The Vagabond, a 1799 novel by George Walker
- The Vagabond, an 1878 play by W. S. Gilbert, originally called The Ne'er-do-Weel
- The Vagabond (poem), a 1895 poem by Henry Lawson, published in The Bulletin
- The Vagabond, a poem by Robert Louis Stevenson, published in Songs of Travel and Other Verses in 1896
- The Vagabond, a 1903 novel by Frederick Palmer
- The Vagabond (novel), a 1910 novel by Colette
- The Vagabond, a 1994 novel by Alexandra Sellers
- Vagabond (novel), a 2002 novel by Bernard Cornwell, the second book in The Grail Quest series
- The Vagabonds, a 2004 novel by Nicholas Delbanco
- Vagabond, a 2014 novel by Gerald Seymour
- Vagabonds, a 2020 novel by Hao Jingfang
- Vagabond, a 2025 memoir by Tim Curry

== Publications ==
- Vagabond (manga), a 1998 manga by Takehiko Inoue
- Vagabond (comics), a Marvel Universe character
- Vagabond (magazine), a Swedish travel magazine

== Film and television ==
- The Vagabonds (1912 film), an American silent film
- The Vagabond (1916 film), a film starring Charlie Chaplin
- The Vagabonds (1916 film), an Austrian silent comedy film
- The Vagabonds (1937 film), a German operetta film
- The Vagabonds (1939 film), a Polish film
- Vagabond (1950 film), an Iranian film
- Awaara (1951 film), an Indian film also known as The Vagabond
- The Vagabond (1953 film), a Mexican comedy film
- Vagabond (1985 film), a film by Agnès Varda
- Paradesi (2013 film), an Indian Tamil language period drama film
- Le Vagabond, or The Littlest Hobo, a Canadian film and television series
- Mo Amer: The Vagabond (2018), a Netflix comedy special by Mo Amer
- Vagabond (TV series), a 2019 South Korean television series

== Music ==
=== Bands ===
- Vagabond (Norwegian band), an alternative rock band fronted by Jørn Lande
- Vagabond (UK band), a band from the UK
- Jimmy James and the Vagabonds, featuring Jimmy James (singer) (born 1940), Jamaican soul music singer
- The Four Vagabonds, commonly known as The Vagabonds.

=== Albums ===
- Vagabond (Eddi Reader album), 2014
- Vagabond (Lasse Stefanz album), 2007
- Vagabond, by Michale Graves
- Vagabond (Spiers and Boden album)
- Vagabond, by Tony Sheridan
- Vagabond, by Valina
- Vagabonds (Gary Louris album), 2008
- Vagabonds, by Satellite Stories
- Vagabonds (The Classic Crime album)
- The Vagabond, by Bryn Terfel
- The Vagabond, a 2005 solo album by Speech

=== Songs ===
- "Vagabond", by Wolfmother from their self-titled album
- "Vagabond", by Greenskeepers in Grand Theft Auto IV
- "Vagabond", by Juliana Hatfield from the album There's Always Another Girl
- "Vagabond", by MisterWives from the album Our Own House
- "Vagabonds", by New Model Army from the album Thunder and Consolation
- "The Vagabond", a musical setting of a Robert Louis Stevenson poem by Ralph Vaughan Williams in his song cycle Songs of Travel
- "The Vagabond", by John Ireland

== Other ==
- Julian Thomas (journalist) (1843–1896), also known as The Vagabond, English-born Australian journalist and author
- Vagabond (boat), a French polar yacht
- Vagabond (sailing dinghy)
- Vagabond Inn, an American hotel chain
- Piper PA-15 Vagabond, a civilian airplane
- Vagabonds RUFC, a rugby union club located in Douglas, Isle of Man
- The Vagabonds (club), a lunch club within the National Arts Club
- Vagabonds Club, an English dining club (1887–1894)

== See also ==
- La Vagabonde (disambiguation)
