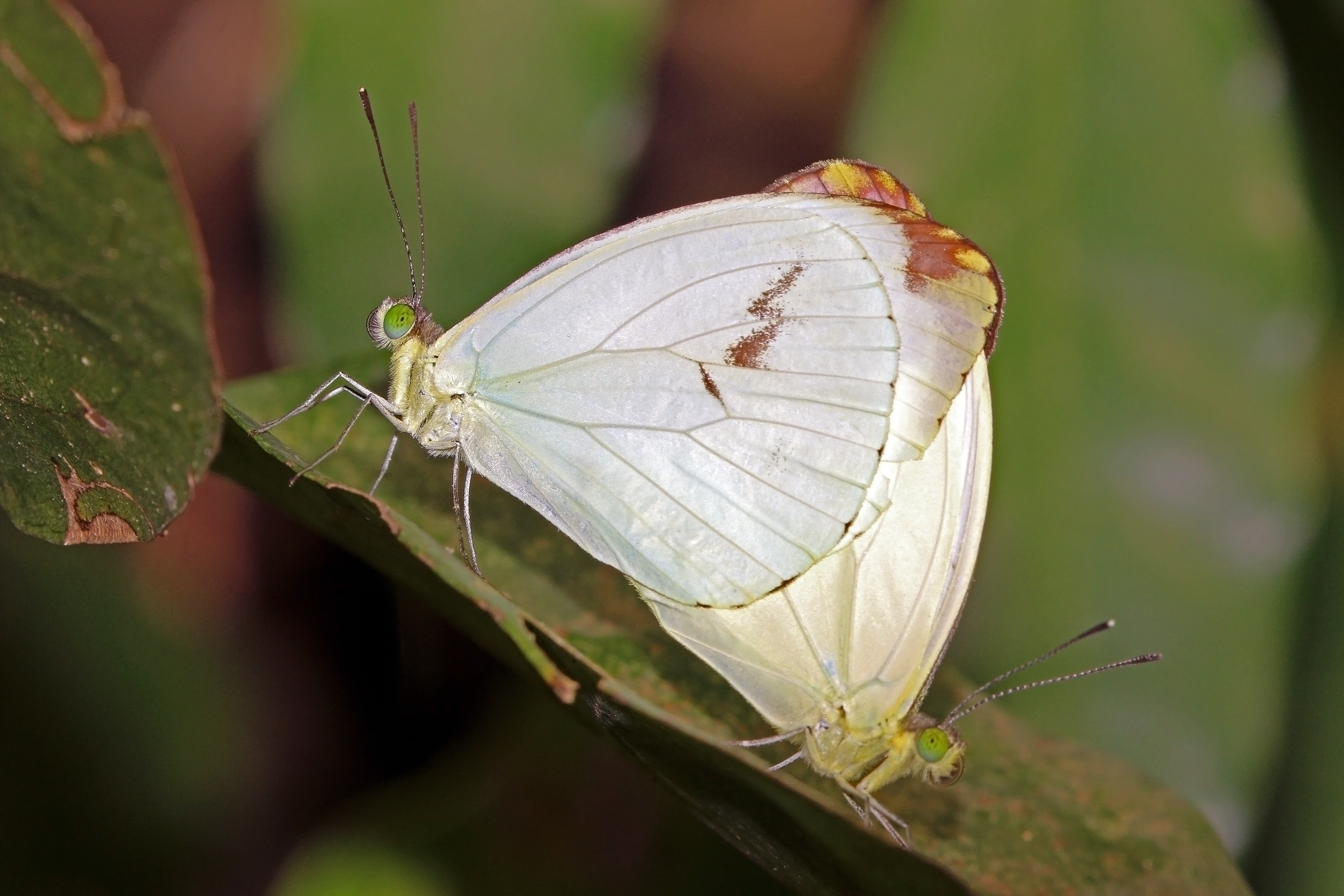
- N. p. pharis, mating Kakum National Park, Ghana

Scientific classification
- Kingdom: Animalia
- Phylum: Arthropoda
- Clade: Pancrustacea
- Class: Insecta
- Order: Lepidoptera
- Family: Pieridae
- Genus: Nepheronia
- Species: N. pharis

Binomial name
- Nepheronia pharis (Boisduval, 1836)

Synonyms
- Pieris pharis Boisduval, 1836; Pieris chione Doubleday, 1844; Lepteronia pharis silvanus Stoneham, 1957

= Nepheronia pharis =

Species of butterfly

Nepheronia pharis, the round-winged vagrant, is a butterfly in the family Pieridae. It is found in Sierra Leone, Guinea, Liberia, Ivory Coast, Ghana, Togo, Benin, Nigeria, Cameroon, Equatorial Guinea, the Republic of the Congo, Angola, the Central African Republic, the Democratic Republic of the Congo, Uganda, Kenya and Tanzania. The habitat consists of undisturbed primary lowland forests and riverine forests.

== Subspecies ==
- Nepheronia pharis pharis (Sierra Leone, coast and north-eastern Guinea, Liberia, Ivory Coast, Ghana, Togo, Benin, Nigeria, Cameroon, Equatorial Guinea, Congo, Angola, Central African Republic, Democratic Republic of the Congo, Uganda)
- Nepheronia pharis silvanus (Stoneham, 1957) (Uganda, western Kenya, north-western Tanzania)

Torben Larsen developed a species numbering system for his 2005 publication Butterflies of West Africa. The nominate subspecies is #47. The 'Larsen' numbers have since been used with permission in A Sharp Eye on Butterflies of Ghana.
