= Meander Eatery =

Restaurant in Pagosa Springs, Colorado, U.S.

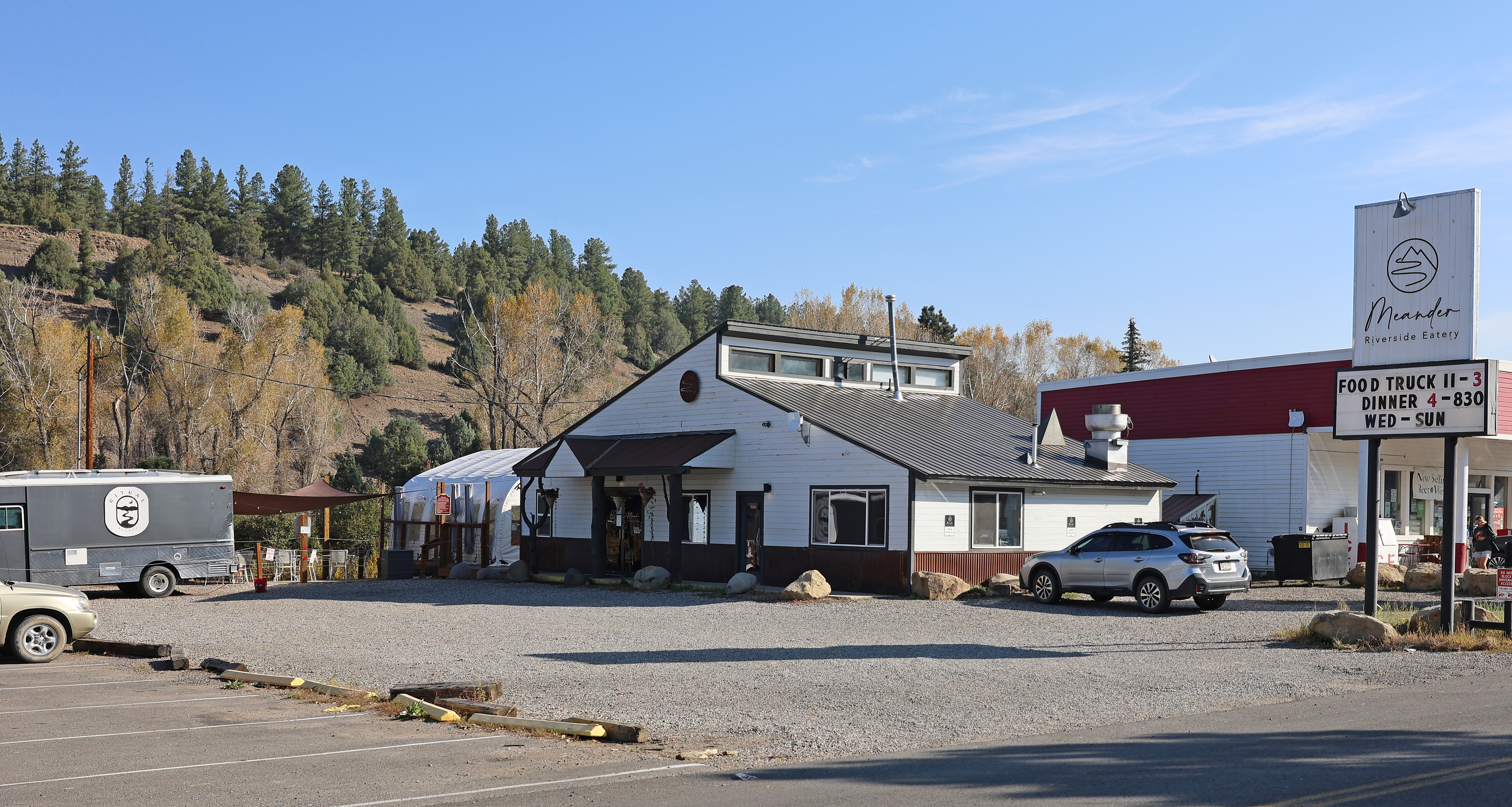
- The restaurant in 2024
- Interactive map of Meander Eatery

Restaurant information
- Established: 2022
- Owner: Charles MacDonald
- Head chef: Charles MacDonald
- Location: 358 East Pagosa Street, Pagosa Springs, Archuleta, Colorado, 81147, United States
- Coordinates: 37°16′11.51″N 106°59′51.65″W
- Website: www.meandereatery.com

Meander Eatery is a farm-to-table restaurant in Pagosa Springs, Colorado. It was included in The New York Times's 2024 list of the fifty best restaurants in the United States. The restaurant was established in 2022.
