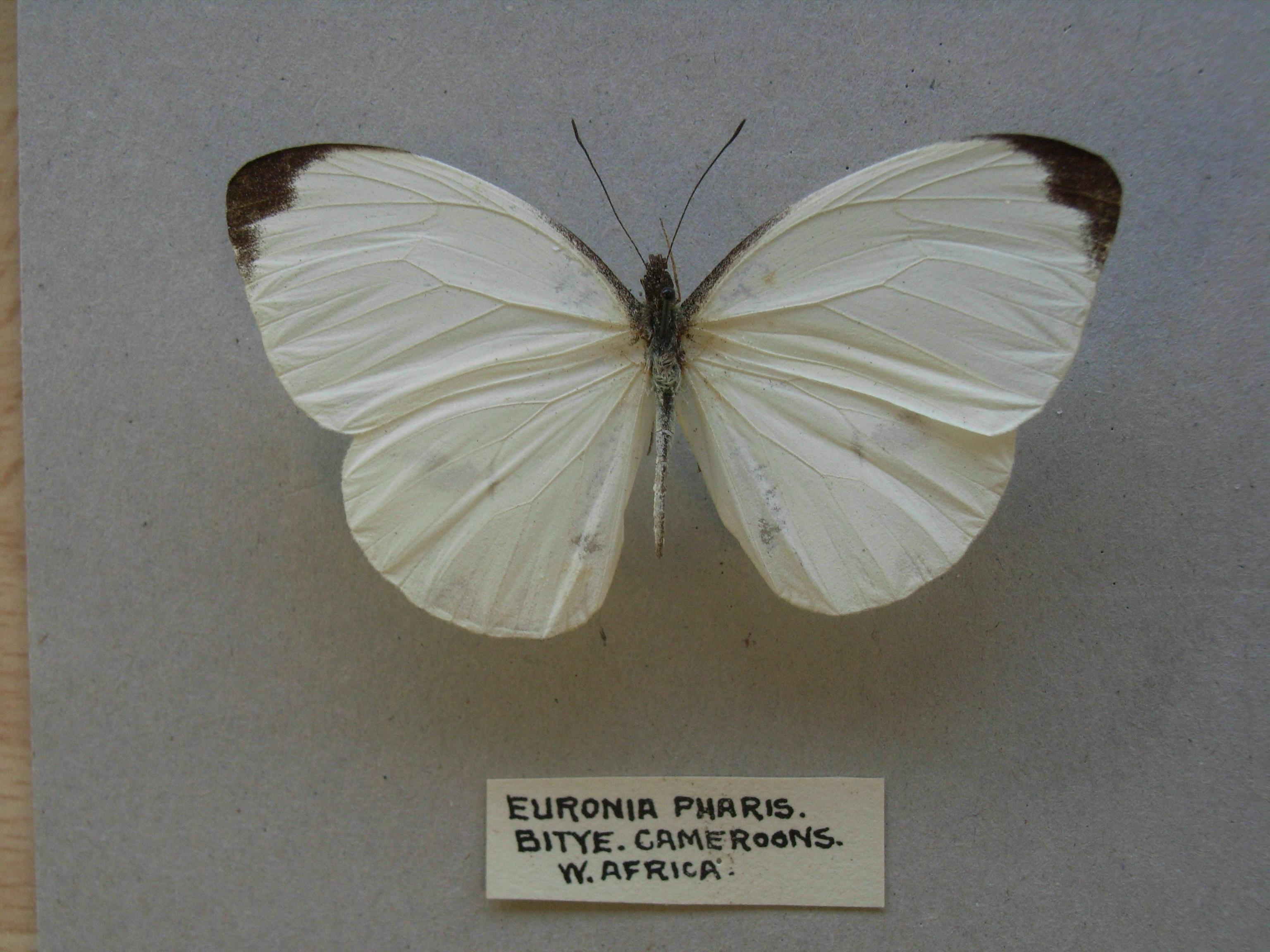
- Nepheronia pharis

Scientific classification
- Kingdom: Animalia
- Phylum: Arthropoda
- Class: Insecta
- Order: Lepidoptera
- Family: Pieridae
- Tribe: Nepheroniini
- Genus: Nepheronia; Butler, 1870

Synonyms
- Leuceronia Aurivillius, 1895; Lepteronia Stoneham, 1957

= Nepheronia =

Butterfly genus in family Pieridae

Nepheronia, commonly called vagrants, is a genus of butterflies of the subfamily Pierinae endemic to Africa. For other vagrants, see the genus Eronia.

== Species ==
Listed alphabetically:

- Nepheronia argia (Fabricius, 1775) – large vagrant
- Nepheronia avatar (Moore, 1858)
- Nepheronia buquetii (Boisduval, 1836) – plain vagrant or Buquet's vagrant
- Nepheronia pharis (Boisduval, 1836)
- Nepheronia thalassina (Boisduval, 1836) – Cambridge vagrant or blue vagrant
- ?Nepheronia usambara (Aurivillius, 1907)

== Bibliography ==
- Woodhall, Steve (2005). Field Guide to Butterflies of South Africa. Cape Town, South Africa: Struik. ISBN 978-1-86872-724-7.
