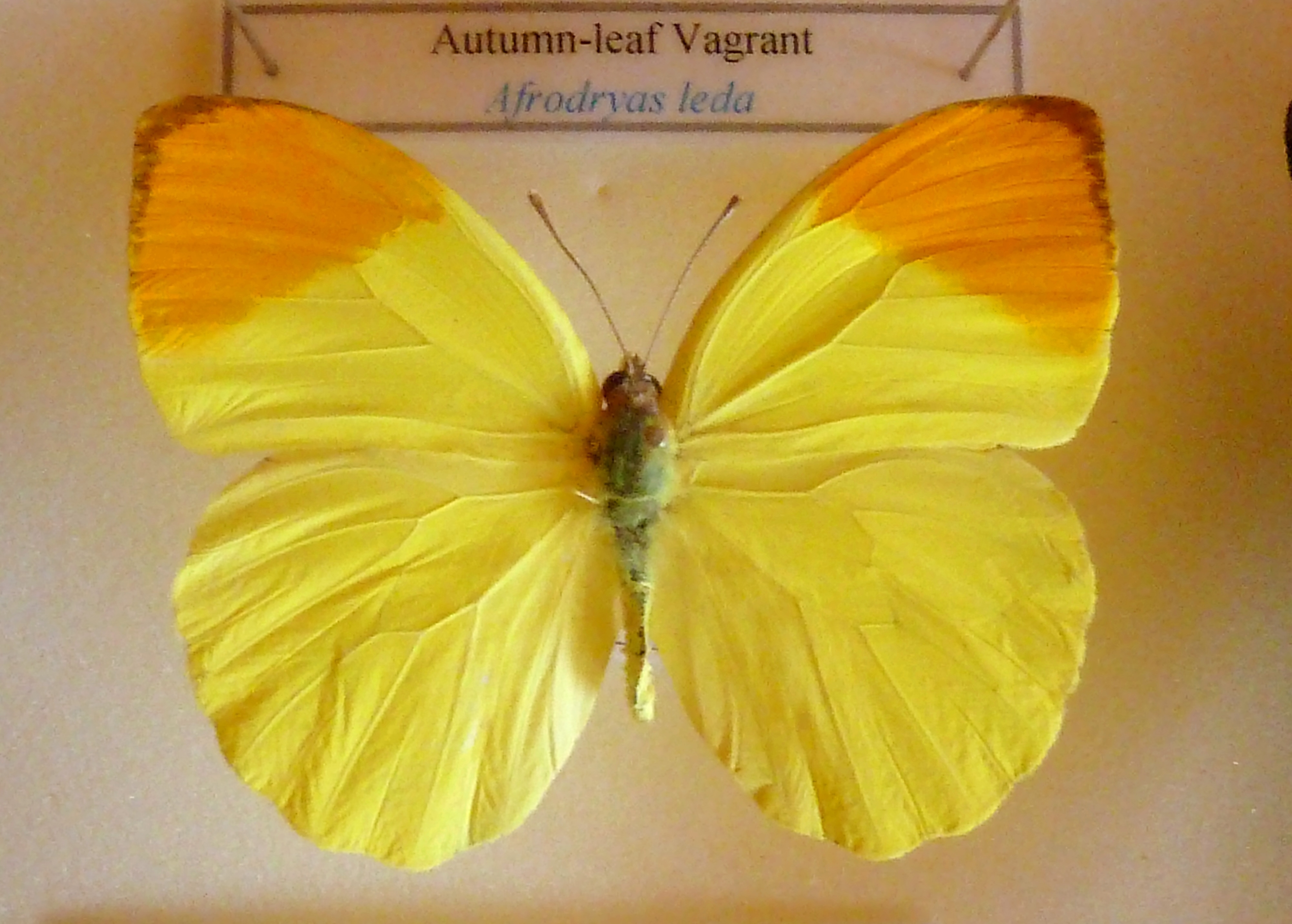

Scientific classification
- Kingdom: Animalia
- Phylum: Arthropoda
- Class: Insecta
- Order: Lepidoptera
- Family: Pieridae
- Tribe: Teracolini
- Genus: Afrodryas Stoneham, 1957
- Species: A. leda

Binomial name
- Afrodryas leda (Boisduval, 1847)

Synonyms
- Dryas leda Boisduval, 1847; Anthocharis tekoukoule Guérin-Méneville, 1849; Dryas wahlbergi Wallengren, 1857; Eronia trimeni Oberthür, 1878; Eronia leda cygnophila Suffert, 1904; Eronia leda pupillata Strand, 1911; Eronia leda var. inargyrata Gaede, 1916; Eronia leda f. trimeni ab. gomensis Dufrane, 1945; Eronia leda f. trimeni ab. flava Dufrane, 1945; Afodryas leda f. clytaemnestra Stoneham, 1957

= Afrodryas leda =

Butterfly of the family Pieridae

Afrodryas leda, the autumn leaf vagrant or orange-and-lemon, is a butterfly of the family Pieridae. It is found throughout Africa.

The wingspan is 50–55 mm for males and 48–56 mm for females. Adults are on wing year-round in warmer areas with peaks in late summer and autumn.

The larvae feed on Capparis tomentosa.
