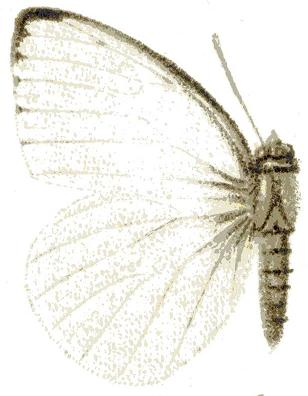
- Male
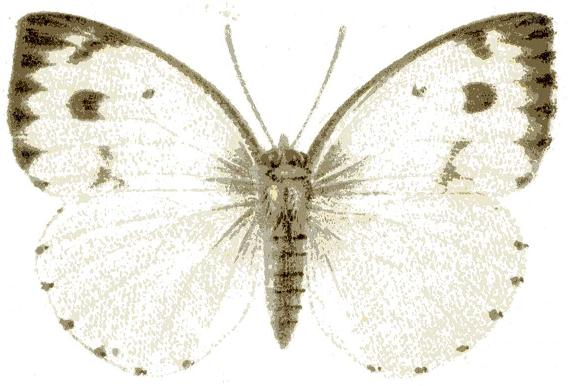
- Female

Scientific classification
- Kingdom: Animalia
- Phylum: Arthropoda
- Clade: Pancrustacea
- Class: Insecta
- Order: Lepidoptera
- Family: Pieridae
- Genus: Dixeia
- Species: D. doxo

Binomial name
- Dixeia doxo (Godart, [1819])

Synonyms
- Pieris doxo Godart, 1819; Pinacopteryx venata voltaensis Talbot, 1929; Pinacopteryx venata voltaensis f. minor Talbot, 1929; Dixeia doxo parva f. inspersa Talbot, 1943; Dixeia doxo parva f. aspersa Talbot, 1943; Ixias venatus Butler, 1871; Dixeia doxo venatus f. desertorum Talbot, 1943

= Dixeia doxo =

Black-veined white

Species of butterfly

Dixeia doxo, the black-veined white, is a butterfly in the family Pieridae and is native to southern Africa.

Wingspan is 34–40 mm in males and 36–42 mm in females. Flight period is year-round.

Larvae feed on Capparis species.

== Subspecies ==
Listed alphabetically.

- D. d. alberta (Grünberg, 1912) (eastern Democratic Republic of the Congo, central and north-central Tanzania)
- D. d. costata Talbot, 1943 (Uganda, western Kenya, coast of Tanzania)
- D. d. doxo (Senegal, Burkina Faso, northern Ghana, northern Nigeria to western Sudan)
- D. d. parva Talbot, 1943 (Malawi, Zambia, Mozambique, Zimbabwe, South Africa)
- D. d. venatus (Butler, 1871) (south-western Ethiopia, southern Sudan)
