= Akinola Alada =

Nigerian professor of physiology

- Born: Nigeria
- Education: University of Cairo (Bsc); University of Ibadan (Msc, PhD)
- Children: 2
- Scientific career
- Workplaces: University of Ibadan

Akinola Alada is a Nigerian professor of physiology at the University of Ibadan and the former Dean of students' affair of the institution.

== Early life and education ==
Akinola Alada was born in Nigeria, he obtained his first bachelor's degree in BSc (Hons) Human Anatomy and Physiology from the university of Cairo in 1985, he obtained his MSc in 1988 and was promoted to the rank of professor of physiology endocrinology and metabolism in 2005 at the University of Ibadan

== Academic career ==
He was the head of department of Human physiology from 2001 to 2003 and was also reappointed in 2010 to 2012. He was the Dean, Students' Affairs Division of university of Ibadan up until August 2025. He is a member of physiological association of Nigeria and also the Editor-in-chief of Nigerian journal of physiological sciences In 2023, he was shortlisted for vice chancellor of university of Ilorin

== Selected publications ==
- Biological effects of Myristica fragrans (nutmeg) extract
- Hematological effect
- Effect of aqueous leaf extract of tridax procumbens on blood pressure and heart rate in rats
- Cardioprotective effects of curcumin-nisin based poly lactic acid nanoparticle on myocardial infarction in guinea pigs
- Efficacy of different brands of mouth rinses on oral bacteria load count in healthy adults
- A comparative study of students' performance in preclinical physiology assessed by multiple choice and short essay questions.
- Studies on the anti-inflammatory properties of Entada abyssinica
- Potassium channels and prostacyclin contribute to vasorelaxant activities of Tridax procumbens crude aqueous leaf extract in rat superior mesenteric arteries HM Salahdeen

== Awards and honors ==
Akinola Alada is a fellow of physiological society of Nigeria, a fellow of Nigerian society of cooperative professionals, member American Physiological Society, physiological society London, and west African society of pharmacology.
