= Sulfate nitrates =

Class of chemical compounds

The sulfate nitrates are a family of double salts that contain both sulfate and nitrate ions (SO^{2−}_{4} and NO^{−}_{3}). They are in the class of mixed anion compounds. A few rare minerals are in this class. Two sulfate nitrates are in the class of anthropogenic compounds, accidentally made as a result of human activities in fertilizers that are a mix of ammonium nitrate and ammonium sulfate, and also in the atmosphere as polluting ammonia, nitrogen dioxide, and sulfur dioxide react with the oxygen and water there to form solid particles. The nitrato group (NO_{3}−) can act as a ligand, and complexes containing it can form salts with sulfate.

== List ==
name	formula	ratio	system	space group	unit cell	volume (Å^{3})	density	optical	references
Darapskite	Na_{3}(SO_{4})(NO_{3})·H_{2}O	1:1	Monoclinic	2/m	a = 10.57 Å, b = 6.91 Å, c = 5.18 Å β = 102.77°	368.98		Biaxial (-) n_{α} = 1.388 n_{β} = 1.479 n_{γ} = 1.486; 2V = 28°	
Humberstonite	Na_{7}K_{3}Mg_{2}(SO_{4})_{6}(NO_{3})_{2}·6H_{2}O	6:2	Trigonal	R3̅	a = 10.905 Å, c = 24.394 Å Z=3	2,512.26	2.252	Uniaxial (-) n_{ω} = 1.474 n_{ε} = 1.436	
Ungemachite	K_{3}Na_{8}Fe(SO_{4})_{6}(NO_{3})_{2}·6H_{2}O	6:2	Trigonal	R3̅	a = 10.898 Å, c = 24.989 Å	2,570.24	2.287	Uniaxial (-) n_{ω} = 1.502 n_{ε} = 1.449	
Mbobomkulite	Ni_{0.75}Cu_{0.25}Al_{4}(NO_{3})_{1.5}(SO_{4})_{0.5}(OH)_{12}·3(H_{2}O)	?	Monoclinic	P2_{1}	a = 10.171 b = 8.865 c = 17.145 β = 95.37°	1,539.11	2.45	blue	
hydrombobomkulite									
Witzkeite	Na_{4}K_{4}Ca(NO_{3})_{2}(SO_{4})_{4}·2H_{2}O	4:2	Monoclinic	C2/c	a = 24.902, b = 5.3323, c = 17.246 Å, β = 94.281(7)°,	2283.6	2.40	biaxial (−) α = 1.470, β = 1.495, γ = 1.510, 2V = 50–70°	
Artificial
Ammonium sulfate nitrate 2AN.AS	(NH_{4})_{4}SO_{4}(NO_{3})_{2}	1:2	Monoclinic	P2_{1}/c	a = 10.3178 b = 11.4014 c = 10.2567 β = 105.956 z = 4	1160.09			
Ammonium sulfate nitrate 3AN.AS	(NH_{4})_{5}SO_{4}(NO_{3})_{3}	1:3	Monoclinic	P2_{1}	a = 9.9566 b = 5.9332 c = 12.4161 β = 92.817 z = 2	732.59			
?	K(NH_{4})_{3}(NO_{3})_{2}SO_{4}								
?	K_{2}(NH_{4})_{2}(NO_{3})_{2}SO_{4}								
Neodymium sulfate nitrate trihydrate	Nd[SO_{4}][NO_{3}]·3H_{2}O	1:1	Monoclinic	P2_{1}/m	a = 6.3056, b = 6.9234, c = 8.9827, β = 93.305° Z = 2			Pale violet	
	Bi(SO_{4})(NO_{3})·3H_{2}O	1:1	Monoclinic	P2_{1}/m	a = 6.2730 b = 6.9370 c = 8.9363β = 92.696°				
Complexes
	[Co(2,2′-bipy)_{2}(NO_{3})]_{2}SO_{4}·(H_{2}O)_{5}								
thiourea complex	[Cu_{4}(SCN_{2}H_{4})_{7}(NO_{3})](NO_{3})(SO_{4}) · 3.3H_{2}O		Monoclinic	P2_{1}	a = 12.6072 Å, b = 15.4265 Å, c = 22.108 Å, β = 120.133° Z = 4				
guanidinium	CN_{3}H_{6}Bi(NO_{3})_{2}SO_{4}	1:2							
ethylenediammonium	C_{2}N_{2}H_{10}BiNO_{3}(SO_{4})_{2}	2:1							
ethylenediammonium	(C_{2}N_{2}H_{10})_{5}Bi_{4}(NO_{3})_{2}(SO_{4})_{10}·8H_{2}O	10:2							
