= Exoskeleton =

External skeleton of an organism

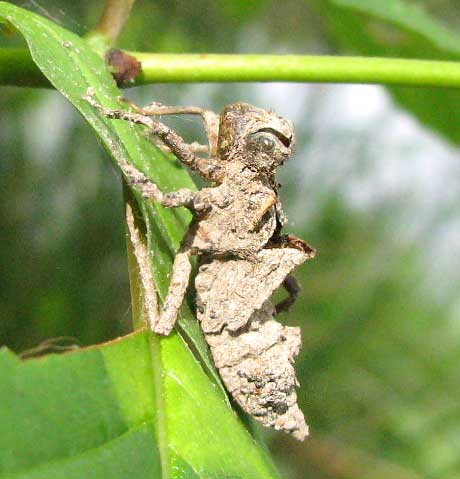
Discarded exoskeleton (exuviae) of dragonfly nymph

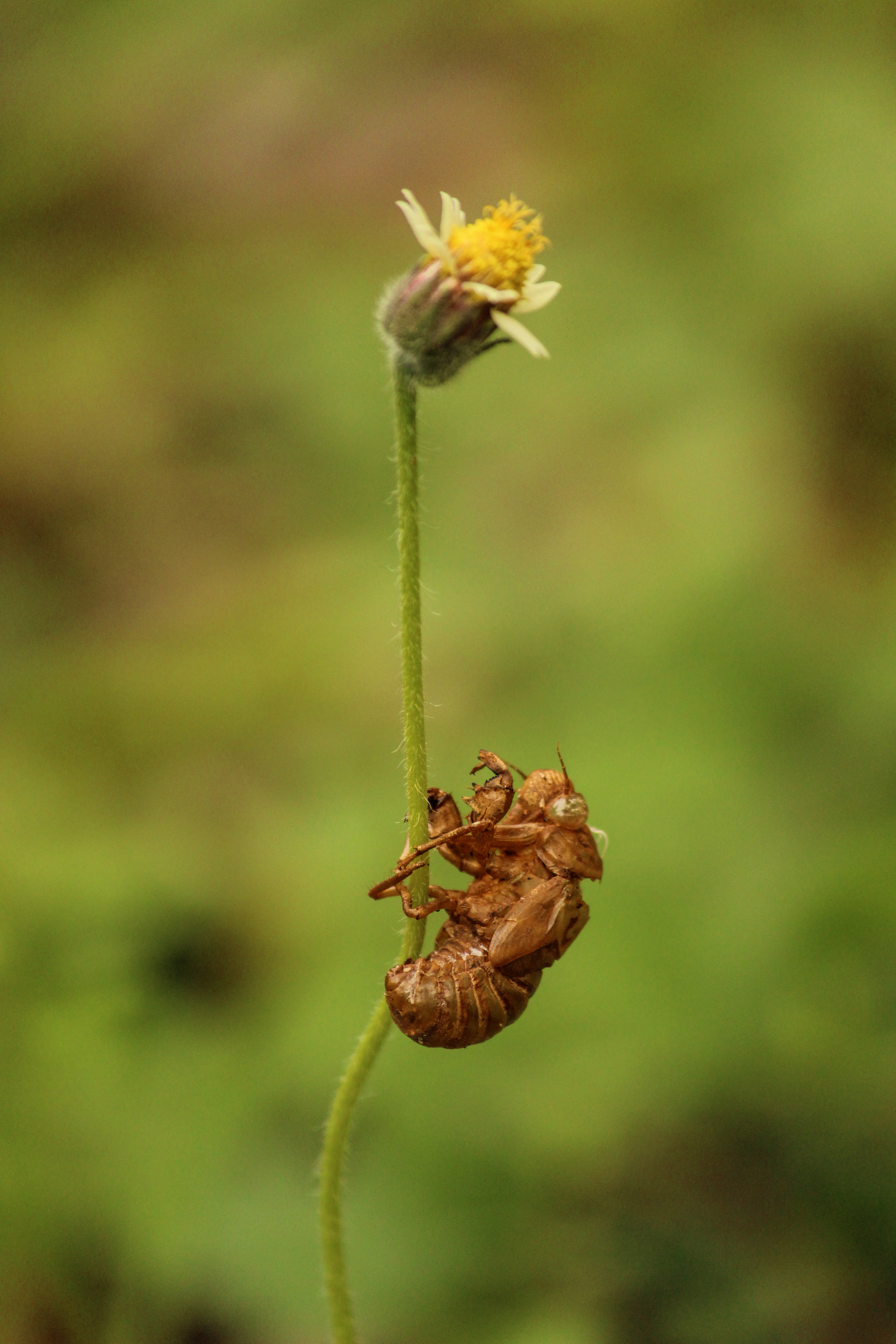
Exoskeleton of cicada attached to a Tridax procumbens (colloquially known as the tridax daisy)

An exoskeleton (from Ancient Greek έξω (éxō) 'outer' and σκελετός (skeletós) 'skeleton') is a skeleton that is on the exterior of an animal in the form of hardened integument, which both supports the body's shape and protects the internal organs, in contrast to an internal endoskeleton (e.g. that of a human) which is enclosed underneath other soft tissues. Some large, hard and non-flexible protective exoskeletons are known as shell or armour.

Examples of exoskeletons in animals include the cuticle skeletons shared by arthropods (insects, chelicerates, myriapods and crustaceans) and tardigrades, as well as the skeletal cups formed by hardened secretion of stony corals, the test/tunic of sea squirts and sea urchins, and the prominent mollusc shell shared by snails, clams, tusk shells, chitons and nautilus. Some vertebrate animals, such as the turtle, have both an endoskeleton and a protective exoskeleton.

== Role ==
Exoskeletons contain rigid and resistant components that fulfill a set of functional roles in addition to structural support in many animals, including protection, respiration, excretion, sensation, feeding and courtship display, and as an osmotic barrier against desiccation in terrestrial organisms. Exoskeletons have roles in defence from parasites and predators and in providing attachment points for musculature.

Arthropod exoskeletons contain chitin; the addition of calcium carbonate makes them harder and stronger, at the price of increased weight. Ingrowths of the arthropod exoskeleton known as apodemes serve as attachment sites for muscles. These structures are composed of chitin and are approximately six times stronger and twice the stiffness of vertebrate tendons. Similar to tendons, apodemes can stretch to store elastic energy for jumping, notably in locusts. Calcium carbonates constitute the shells of molluscs, brachiopods, and some tube-building polychaete worms. Silica forms the exoskeleton in the microscopic diatoms and radiolaria. One mollusc species, the scaly-foot gastropod, even uses the iron sulfides greigite and pyrite.

Some organisms, such as some foraminifera, agglutinate exoskeletons by sticking grains of sand and shell to their exterior. Contrary to a common misconception, echinoderms do not possess an exoskeleton and their test is always contained within a layer of living tissue.

Exoskeletons have evolved independently many times; 18 lineages evolved calcified exoskeletons alone. Further, other lineages have produced tough outer coatings, such as some mammals, that are analogous to an exoskeleton. This coating is constructed from bone in the armadillo, and hair in the pangolin. The armour of reptiles like turtles and dinosaurs like Ankylosaurs is constructed of bone; crocodiles have bony scutes and horny scales.

== Growth ==
Since exoskeletons are rigid, they present some limits to growth. Organisms with open shells can grow by adding new material to the aperture of their shell, as is the case in gastropods, bivalves, and other molluscans. A true exoskeleton, like that found in panarthropods, must be shed via moulting (ecdysis) when the animal starts to outgrow it. A new exoskeleton is produced beneath the old one, and the new skeleton is soft and pliable before shedding the old one. The animal will typically stay in a den or burrow during moulting, as it is quite vulnerable to trauma during this period. Once at least partially set, the organism will plump itself up to try to expand the exoskeleton. The new exoskeleton is still capable of growing to some degree before it is eventually hardened. In contrast, moulting reptiles shed only the outer layer of skin and often exhibit indeterminate growth. These animals produce new skin and integuments throughout their life, replacing them according to growth. Arthropod growth, however, is limited by the space within its current exoskeleton. Failure to shed the exoskeleton once outgrown can result in the animal's death or prevent subadults from reaching maturity, thus preventing them from reproducing. This is the mechanism behind some insect pesticides, such as Azadirachtin.

== Paleontological significance ==
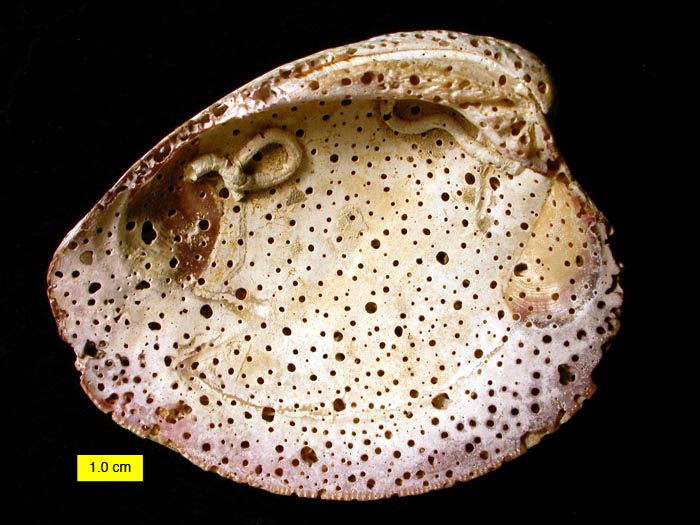
Borings in exoskeletons can provide evidence of animal behaviour. In this case, boring sponges attacked this hard clam shell after the death of the clam, producing the trace fossil Entobia.

Exoskeletons, as hard parts of organisms, are greatly useful in assisting the preservation of organisms, whose soft parts usually rot before they can be fossilized. Mineralized exoskeletons can be preserved as shell fragments. The possession of an exoskeleton permits a couple of other routes to fossilization. For instance, the strong layer can resist compaction, allowing a mould of the organism to be formed underneath the skeleton, which may later decay. Alternatively, exceptional preservation may result in chitin being mineralised, as in the Burgess Shale.

However, our dependence on fossilised skeletons also significantly limits our understanding of evolution. Only the parts of organisms that were already mineralised are usually preserved, such as the shells of molluscs. It helps that exoskeletons often contain "muscle scars", marks where muscles have been attached to the exoskeleton, which may allow the reconstruction of much of an organism's internal parts from its exoskeleton alone. The most significant limitation is that, although there are 30-plus phyla of living animals, two-thirds of these phyla have never been found as fossils, because most animal species are soft-bodied and decay before they can become fossilised.

Mineralized skeletons first appear in the fossil record shortly before the base of the Cambrian period, 550 million years ago. The evolution of a mineralised exoskeleton is considered a possible driving force of the Cambrian explosion of animal life, resulting in a diversification of predatory and defensive tactics. However, some Precambrian (Ediacaran) organisms produced tough outer shells while others, such as Cloudina, had a calcified exoskeleton. Some Cloudina shells even show evidence of predation, in the form of borings.

== Evolution ==
The fossil record primarily contains mineralized exoskeletons, since these are by far the most durable. Since most lineages with exoskeletons are thought to have started with a non-mineralized exoskeleton which they later mineralized, it is difficult to comment on the very early evolution of each lineage's exoskeleton. It is known, however, that in a very short course of time, just before the Cambrian period, exoskeletons made of various materials – silica, calcium phosphate, calcite, aragonite, and even glued-together mineral flakes – sprang up in a range of different environments. Most lineages adopted the form of calcium carbonate which was stable in the ocean at the time they first mineralized, and did not change from this mineral morph - even when it became less favourable.

Some Precambrian (Ediacaran) organisms produced tough but non-mineralized outer shells, while others, such as Cloudina, had a calcified exoskeleton, but mineralized skeletons did not become common until the beginning of the Cambrian period, with the rise of the "small shelly fauna". Just after the base of the Cambrian, these miniature fossils become diverse and abundant – this abruptness may be an illusion since the chemical conditions which preserved the small shells appeared at the same time. Most other shell-forming organisms appeared during the Cambrian period, with the Bryozoans being the only calcifying phylum to appear later, in the Ordovician. The sudden appearance of shells has been linked to a change in ocean chemistry which made the calcium compounds of which the shells are constructed stable enough to be precipitated into a shell. However, this is unlikely to be a sufficient cause, as the main construction cost of shells is in creating the proteins and polysaccharides required for the shell's composite structure, not in the precipitation of the mineral components. Skeletonization also appeared at almost the same time that animals started burrowing to avoid predation, and one of the earliest exoskeletons was made of glued-together mineral flakes, suggesting that skeletonization was likewise a response to increased pressure from predators.

Ocean chemistry may also control which mineral shells are constructed of. Calcium carbonate has two forms, the stable calcite and the metastable aragonite, which is stable within a reasonable range of chemical environments but rapidly becomes unstable outside this range. When the oceans contain a relatively high proportion of magnesium compared to calcium, aragonite is more stable, but as the magnesium concentration drops, it becomes less stable, hence harder to incorporate into an exoskeleton, as it will tend to dissolve.

Except for the molluscs, whose shells often comprise both forms, most lineages use just one form of the mineral. The form used appears to reflect the seawater chemistry – thus which form was more easily precipitated – at the time that the lineage first evolved a calcified skeleton, and does not change thereafter. However, the relative abundance of calcite- and aragonite-using lineages does not reflect subsequent seawater chemistry – the magnesium/calcium ratio of the oceans appears to have a negligible impact on organisms' success, which is instead controlled mainly by how well they recover from mass extinctions. A recently discovered modern gastropod Chrysomallon squamiferum that lives near deep-sea hydrothermal vents illustrates the influence of both ancient and modern local chemical environments: its shell is made of aragonite, which is found in some of the earliest fossil molluscs; but it also has armour plates on the sides of its foot, and these are mineralised with the iron sulfides pyrite and greigite, which had never previously been found in any metazoan but whose ingredients are emitted in large quantities by the vents.

Exoskeleton of a cicada

== See also ==
- Arthropod exoskeleton
- Endoskeleton
- Hydrostatic skeleton
- Osteoderm
- Powered exoskeleton
- Scaly-foot gastropod – Deep-sea gastropod known to incorporate iron into its exoskeleton
- Spiracle – small openings in the exoskeleton that allow insects to breathe
- Stolon
