= Tarucus ungemachi =

Scientific classification
- Kingdom: Animalia
- Phylum: Arthropoda
- Class: Insecta
- Order: Lepidoptera
- Family: Lycaenidae
- Genus: Tarucus
- Species: T. ungemachi

Binomial name
- Tarucus ungemachi Stempffer, 1942

Species of butterfly

Tarucus ungemachi, the Ungemach's Pierrot, is a butterfly in the family Lycaenidae. It is found in Senegal, the Gambia, Guinea, Burkina Faso, northern Ghana, northern Nigeria, northern Cameroon, Chad, southern Sudan, Ethiopia, northern Uganda and northwestern Kenya. The habitat consists of savanna, including Sudan savanna and Guinea savanna.

The species is named after Henri Ungemach.

Adults typically feed from the flowers of Ziziphus, Tridax and other species.

The larvae feed on Ziziphus abyssinica.
