= Oreocossus politzari =

Scientific classification
- Kingdom: Animalia
- Phylum: Arthropoda
- Clade: Pancrustacea
- Class: Insecta
- Order: Lepidoptera
- Family: Cossidae
- Genus: Oreocossus
- Species: O. politzari

Binomial name
- Oreocossus politzari Yakovlev & Saldaitis, 2011

Species of moth

Oreocossus politzari is a species of moth of the family Cossidae. It is found in Kenya.
