= Acraea ungemachi =

Scientific classification
- Kingdom: Animalia
- Phylum: Arthropoda
- Class: Insecta
- Order: Lepidoptera
- Family: Nymphalidae
- Genus: Acraea
- Species: A. ungemachi

Binomial name
- Acraea ungemachi Le Cerf, 1927

Synonyms
- Acraea (Actinote) ungemachi; Acraea ungemachi f. nuda Ungemach, 1932

Species of insect

Acraea ungemachi is a butterfly in the family Nymphalidae. It is found in the highlands of Ethiopia. The species is named after Henri Ungemach.

== Taxonomy ==
It is a member of the Acraea circeis species group - but see also Pierre & Bernaud, 2014
