= Henri Ungemach =

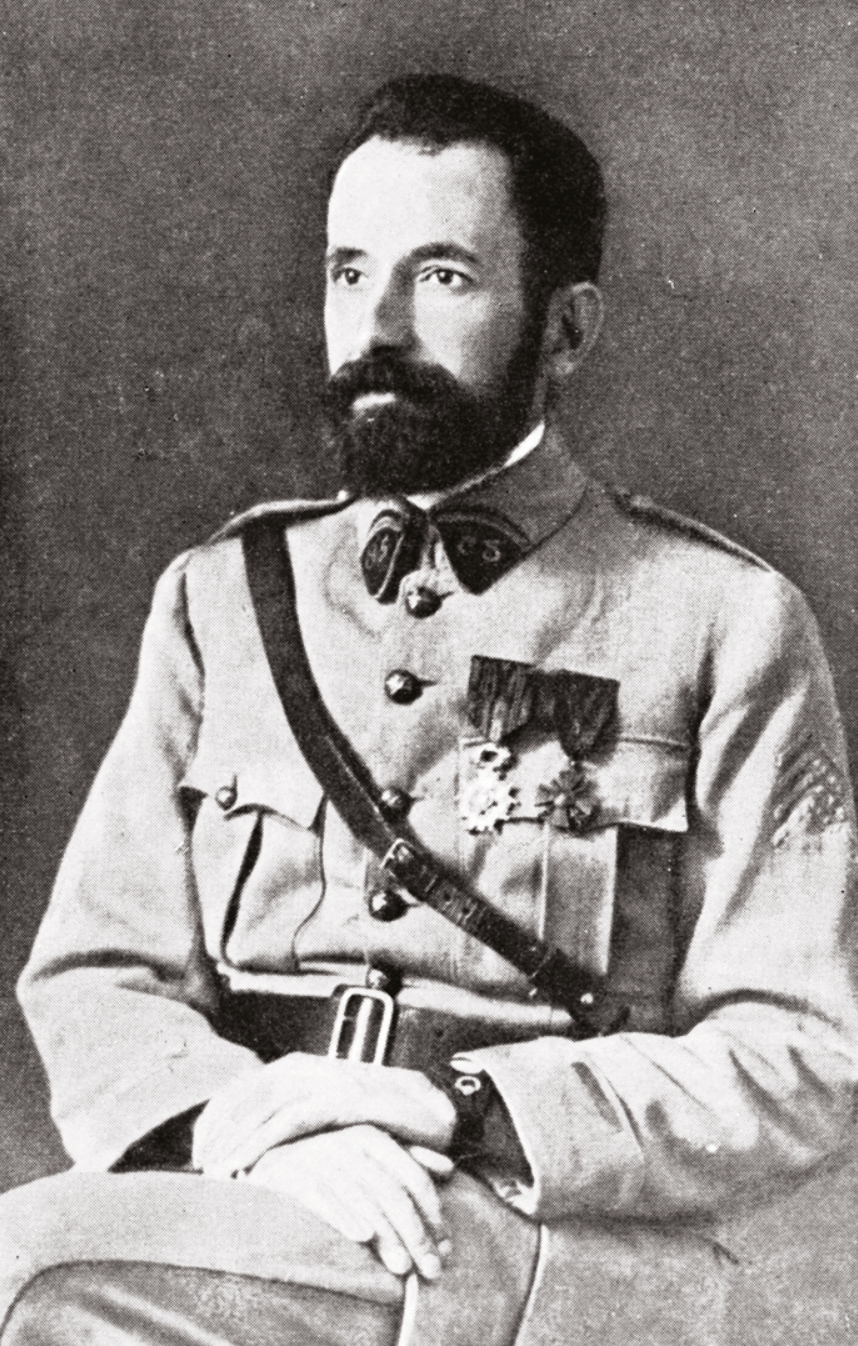
In 1918 wearing in the uniform of the 85th artillery regiment

Henri Léon Ungemach (19 September 1879 – 11 June 1936) was an Alsatian mineralogist who made a collection of minerals, nearly 3000 of which are now held at the Muséum National d’Histoire Naturelle in Paris. He described minerals using their crystal geometry. The minerals Ungemachite and Clino-Ungemachite (hydrated salt sulphates) are named after him. He also collected insects (particularly moths), molluscs and plants during his travels.

== Life and work ==
Ungemach was born in Strasbourg to industrialist Charles Léon and Marie Élisabeth . He went to study at the Jean Sturm Gymnasium in Strasbourg before going to the Eidgenossische Technische Hochschule in Zurich to study chemistry. He graduated in 1904 and went to the Imperial University of Strasbourg where he received a doctorate in 1907 with a thesis ("Die Erzlagerstätten des Weilertales") on the minerals of the Val de Villé. He travelled to North America before joining in prospecting for silver in the Val de Villé from 1908. In 1912 he joined the Compagnie Générale des Colonies for prospecting in Morocco and Madagascar. During World War I he joined an Alsatian regiment but refused to fight for the Germans. After World War I he travelled extensively including to Ethiopia. Chronic bronchitis made him return to Strasbourg in 1932 where he began to catalogue the mineral collections in the university. He studied crystals and made goniometric measurements of more than 2300 crystals using a Babinet-Fuess one-circle reflecting goniometer. He drew the crystal structures with great care and calculated Miller indices for the faces. His work was later used in comparisons with X-ray crystallography results. His diagrams were also used in the atlas produced by Victor Goldschmidt (1853–1933). He introduced a term "syntaxy" referring to intergrowth of dimorphous substances. Just before his death he passed on some of his collections and manuscripts to José Donnay of the University of Baltimore. Donnay donated the collections to the Canadian museum. After his death some of his collections went to the Université de Liège in Belgium. His lepidopteran collections are in Paris. A number of species were described from his collections and named after him including:

- Colotis ungemachi Le Cerf, 1922
- Tarucus ungemachi Stempffer, 1924
- Cigaritis allardi ungemachi Rothschild, 1926
- Plebejus martini ungemachi Rothschild, 1926
- Acraea ungemachi Le Cerf, 1927
- Charaxes lactetinctus ungemachi Le Cerf, 1927
- Atlantarctia ungemachi Le Cerf, 1924
- Odontocheilopteryx ungemachi Tams, 1931
- Adactylotis ungemachi D. Lucas, 1933
- Uollega ungemachi Berio, 1945
- Aspidhampsonia ungemachi Laporte, 1978
- Aspidifrontia ungemachi Laporte, 1978
- Amazonides ungemachi Laporte, 1984
- Stilbotis ungemachi Laporte, 1984
- Oreocossus ungemachi Rougeot, 1977

Ungemach married Éva Denise Andrée, daughter of the French art historian Léonce Bénédite in Paris in 1908. They had four children.
