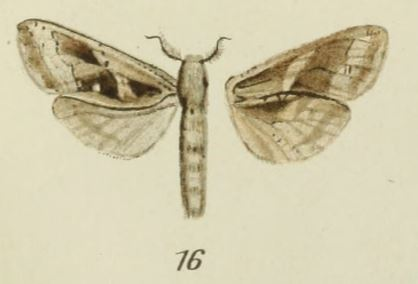

Scientific classification
- Domain: Eukaryota
- Kingdom: Animalia
- Phylum: Arthropoda
- Class: Insecta
- Order: Lepidoptera
- Family: Cossidae
- Genus: Oreocossus
- Species: O. occidentalis

Binomial name
- Oreocossus occidentalis Strand, 1913

= Oreocossus occidentalis =

Species of moth

Oreocossus occidentalis is a moth in the family of Cossidae.

== Distribution ==
It is found in Angola, Cameroon, the Democratic Republic of the Congo, Equatorial Guinea, Ethiopia, Kenya, Mozambique, South Africa, Tanzania and Uganda.
