= Arctia ungemachi =

Scientific classification
- Domain: Eukaryota
- Kingdom: Animalia
- Phylum: Arthropoda
- Class: Insecta
- Order: Lepidoptera
- Superfamily: Noctuoidea
- Family: Erebidae
- Subfamily: Arctiinae
- Genus: Arctia
- Species: A. ungemachi

Binomial name
- Arctia ungemachi (Le Cerf, 1924)

Synonyms
- Atlantarctia ungemachi (Le Cerf, 1924); Apantesis ungemachi Le Cerf, 1924

Species of moth

Arctia ungemachi is a moth of the family Erebidae. It was described by Ferdinand Le Cerf in 1924 and is named after Henri Ungemach. It is found in Morocco.

The larvae feed on Taraxacum and Plantago species.

This species, along with the others of the genus Atlantarctia, was moved to Arctia as a result of phylogenetic research published by Rönkä et al. in 2016.
