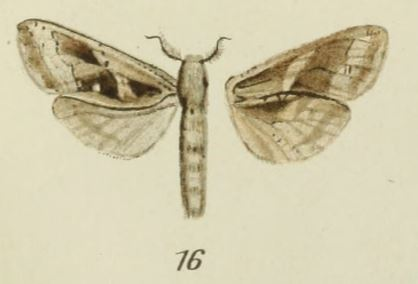
- Oreocossus occidentalis

Scientific classification
- Domain: Eukaryota
- Kingdom: Animalia
- Phylum: Arthropoda
- Class: Insecta
- Order: Lepidoptera
- Family: Cossidae
- Subfamily: Zeuzerinae
- Genus: Oreocossus; Aurivillius, 1910

= Oreocossus =

Genus of moths

Oreocossus is a genus of moths in the family Cossidae.

== Species ==
- Oreocossus grzimeki Yakovlev, 2011
- Oreocossus gurkoi Yakovlev, 2011
- Oreocossus kilimanjarensis (Holland, 1892)
- Oreocossus occidentalis Strand, 1913
- Oreocossus politzari Yakovlev & Saldaitis, 2011
- Oreocossus ungemachi Rougeot, 1977
