= Oreocossus ungemachi =

Scientific classification
- Kingdom: Animalia
- Phylum: Arthropoda
- Clade: Pancrustacea
- Class: Insecta
- Order: Lepidoptera
- Family: Cossidae
- Genus: Oreocossus
- Species: O. ungemachi

Binomial name
- Oreocossus ungemachi Rougeot, 1977

Species of moth

Oreocossus ungemachi is a species of moth of the family Cossidae. It is found in Ethiopia. The species is named after Henri Ungemach.
