= Oreocossus kilimanjarensis =

Scientific classification
- Domain: Eukaryota
- Kingdom: Animalia
- Phylum: Arthropoda
- Class: Insecta
- Order: Lepidoptera
- Family: Cossidae
- Genus: Oreocossus
- Species: O. kilimanjarensis

Binomial name
- Oreocossus kilimanjarensis (Holland, 1892)

Synonyms
- Duomitus kilimanjarensis Holland, 1892; Oreocossus kilimandjaronis Gaede, 1929; Duomitus cilimanjarensis Hampson, 1909

Species of moth

Oreocossus kilimanjarensis is a moth in the family Cossidae. It is found in the Democratic Republic of Congo, Ethiopia, Kenya, Malawi, South Africa, Tanzania and Zimbabwe.
