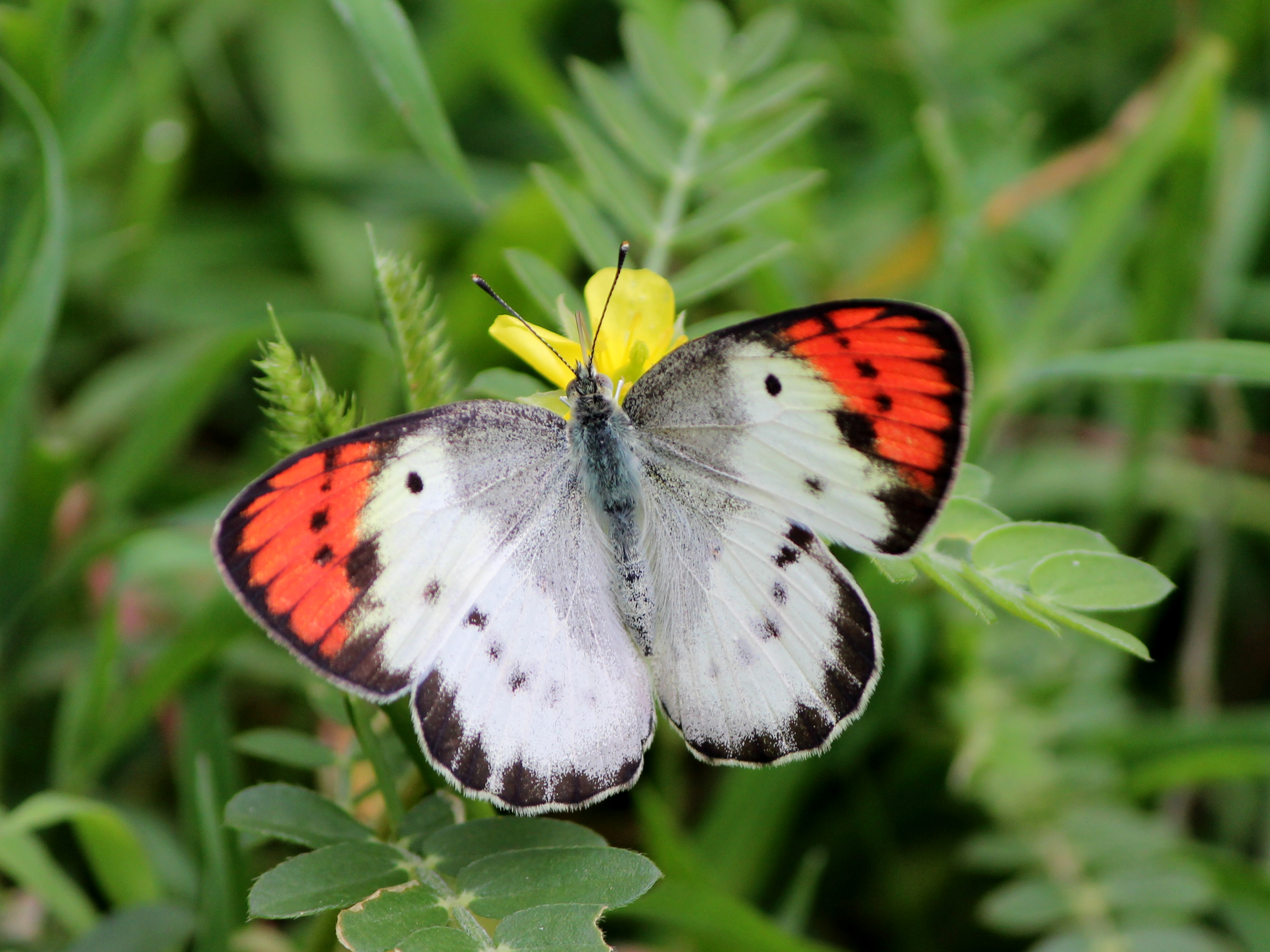

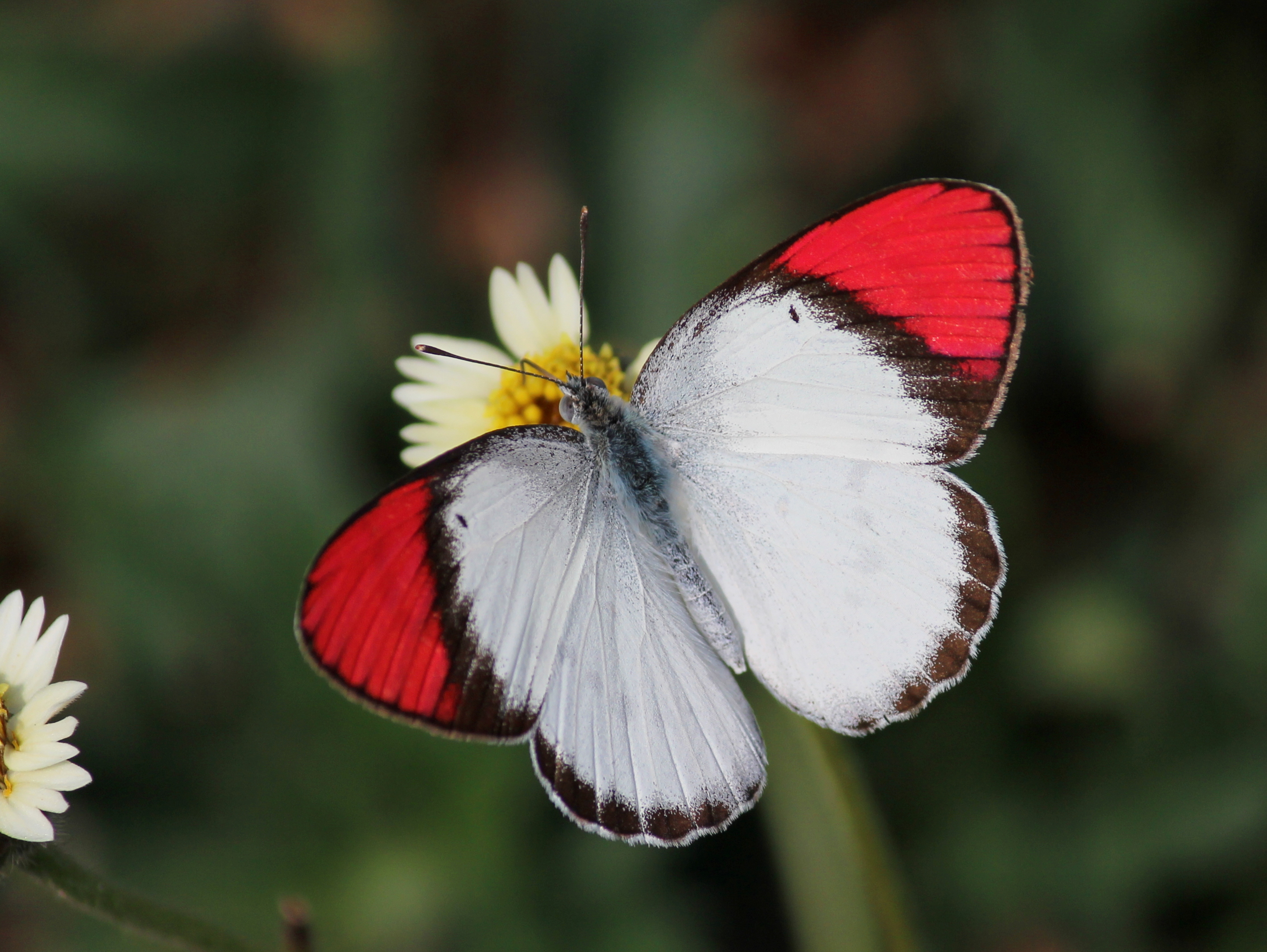
- Female and male at Bangalore, India

Scientific classification
- Domain: Eukaryota
- Kingdom: Animalia
- Phylum: Arthropoda
- Class: Insecta
- Order: Lepidoptera
- Family: Pieridae
- Genus: Colotis
- Species: C. danae

Binomial name
- Colotis danae (Fabricius, 1775)

Synonyms
- Papilio danae Fabricius, 1775; Colotis (Colotis) danae; Teracolus dulcis Butler, 1876; Teracolus dirus Butler, 1876; Teracolus eboreoides Butler, 1876; Teracolus immaculatus Swinhoe, 1884; Teracolus subroseus Swinhoe, 1884; Callosune alberta Swinhoe, 1890; Callosune subroseus Swinhoe, 1884; Thestias annae Wallengren, 1857; Teracolus cinerascens Butler, 1873; Teracolus wallengreni Butler, 1876; Callosune confusa Westwood, 1889; Colotis ione phlegyas ab. cotini Dufrane, 1947; Colotis ione phlegyas ab. flava Dufrane, 1947; Colotis danae ab. fuliginea Vári, 1976; Colotis danae annae f. steeleii Woodhall, 2000; Pontia eupompe Klug, 1829; Anthopsyche theopompe Felder and Felder, 1865; Anthopsyche anteupompe Felder and Felder, 1865; Anthopsyche dedecora Felder and Felder, 1865; Teracolus eupompe f. pulchra Ungemach, 1932; Teracolus eupompe f. depurpurata Ungemach, 1932; Teracolus eupompe ab. pallidus Ungemach, 1932; Colotis danae annae f. benadirensis Storace, 1949; Teracolus pseudacaste Butler, 1876; Teracolus phoenius Butler, 1876; Teracolus miles Butler, 1883; Teracolus annae ab. sulphurosa Thurau, 1904; Colotis danae pseudacaste f. nigrilinea Talbot, 1939; Colotis eupompe f. cytherea Stoneham, 1957; Colotis eupompe f. dione Stoneham, 1957; Colotis eupompe f. ceres Stoneham, 1957; Teracolus walkeri Butler, 1884

= Colotis danae =

Crimson tip

Species of butterfly

Colotis danae, the crimson tip or scarlet tip, is a small butterfly of the family Pieridae, that is, the yellows and whites. It is found in Asia and Africa.

== Description ==
Colouration very variable, especially in the female, from orange to red.

=== Male ===
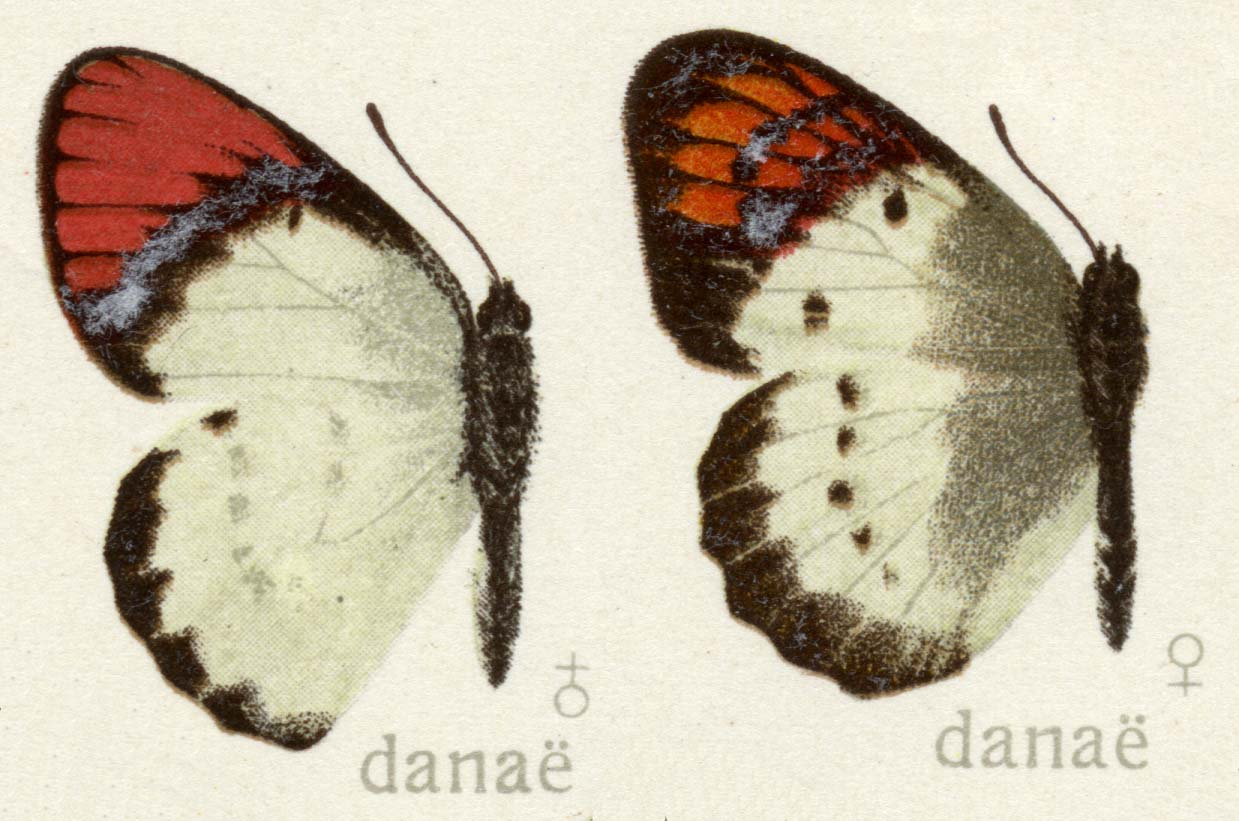

Upperside: white, base of wings generally irrorated (speckled), but to a varying extent, with black scales. This irroration in many specimens is entirely wanting. Forewing: with or without a minute black spot on the discocellulars; apex broadly carmine, edged internally and externally with black, this black border varies in width, but both inner and outer borders meet on the costa and on the termen, on the latter they unite and sometimes extend as a black line to the tornus. Hindwing: uniform, except for a series of black terminal spots, which in some specimens are comparatively large and connected together by an anteciliary slender black line, in others minute, more or less obsolescent, unconnected dots.

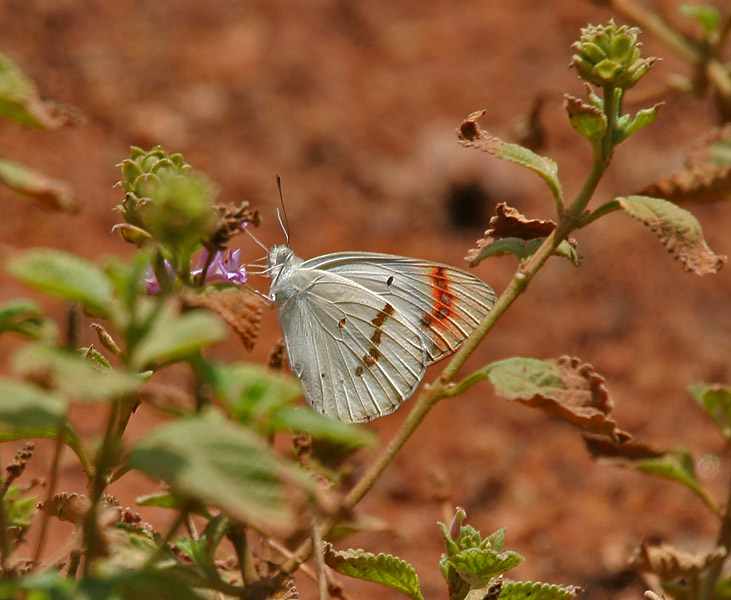
Male in Hyderabad, India

Underside: white. Forewing: base of cell washed with sulphur-yellow; spot on discocellulars as on the upperside; apical carmine area of the upperside represented by an ochraceous-pink patch, not margined with black, but similar in shape and position; in some specimens this is more or less suffused with greyish scales; in all, it is crossed near its inner edge by an obliquely placed series of four or five spots that vary in colour from pale ferruginous to black. In some specimens there are two terminal diffuse black spots, one each at the ends of veins 2 and 3. Hindwing: the ground colour generally lightly, often heavily, suffused with ochraceous pink, sometimes pure white; a small spot on the discocellulars pale ferruginous to black, sometimes annular and centred with carmine; followed by a curved macular discal band that also varies in colour from pale ferruginous to black and has the posterior spots often obsolescent, or even completely absent; a series of minute black dots at the apices of the veins that runs to the termen, and may or may not be connected by a slender black anteciliary line. Antennae pale brown, speckled with white; head, thorax and abdomen black; head and thorax anteriorly clothed with brown, sometimes greyish-black hairs; beneath: palpi, thorax and abdomen white.

=== Female ===
Upperside: white; base of wings lightly, often heavily, irrorated with greyish-black scales. In some specimens the irroration is very scanty, in others it occupies fully a third of the wings from base and extends as a broad band parallel to the dorsum on the hindwing. Forewing: an apical carmine patch as in the male but smaller, sometimes reduced to a mere row of preapical pale rosy streaks, but always bordered externally, and generally internally also, by black of varying width. In some specimens the inner black border is very narrow, in others broad, and in a very few entirely absent. The outer border again in some specimens is inwardly festooned, and may be either broad or comparatively narrow. Discocellular spot as in the male but larger, followed by an anterior, postdiscal, macular, curved, black band, the upper spots of which cross the carmine area, or when the carmine area is reduced to short streaks the band crosses the black internal edging to it, showing up in a darker tint than the edging itself; lastly, a black transverse, somewhat diffuse, spot in interspaces 1 and 2. Hindwing: with a dusky spot on the discocellulars, a black, macular, discal, curved, more or less incomplete band, and a terminal row of black spots that in some specimens are connected and form a continuous band. All these markings are generally diffuse.

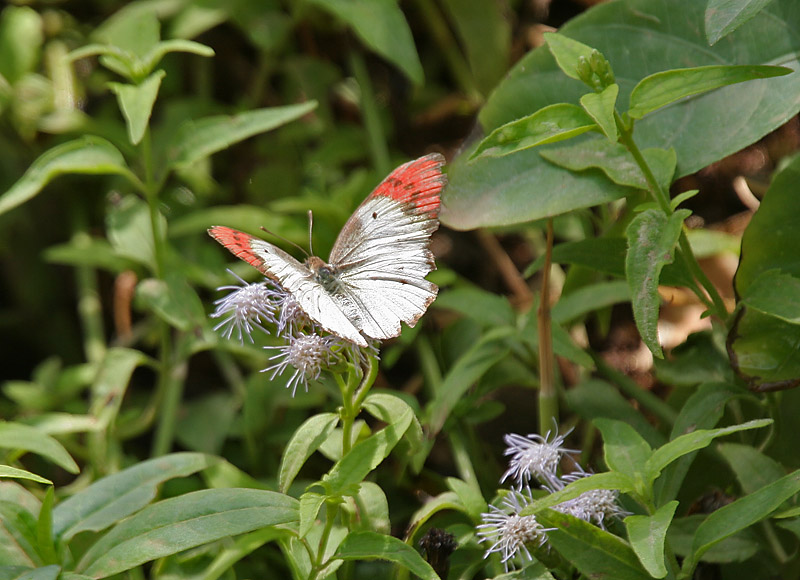
Female in Hyderabad, India

Underside, forewing: white, suffused with sulphur yellow at base of cell and with ochraceous (in some specimens ochraceous grey, in others ochraceous red) on apical area; spot on discocellulars, the postdiscal macular band and spots in interspaces 1 and 2 as on the upperside, but more clearly defined, the spots that compose the postdiscal band sometimes annular. Hindwing: white, suffused to a greater or less degree with, ochraceous, sometimes pink; spot on discocellulars and discal macular band as on the upperside, but both the discocellular spot and the spots that compose the latter more clearly defined, annular and generally centred with carmine; a terminal row of black specks which may or may not be connected by a very slender anteciliary line.

Wingspan of 45–50 mm in males and 48–52 mm in females.

== Distribution ==
Baluchistan, western and southern India, Sri Lanka, Mauritania, Senegal, the Gambia, Mali, Burkina Faso, Ivory Coast, Iran, Ghana, Nigeria, Niger, Chad, Sudan, Ethiopia, Arabia, Somalia, Uganda, Kenya, Tanzania, Angola, Malawi, Zambia, Mozambique, Zimbabwe, Botswana, Namibia, South Africa, Eswatini and United Arab Emirates.

== Subspecies ==
- C. d. danae — India, Sri Lanka
- C. d. annae (Wallengren, 1857) — Malawi, southern and eastern Zambia, Mozambique, Zimbabwe, north-eastern Botswana, north-eastern Namibia, South Africa, Eswatini
- C. d. dulcis (Butler, 1876) — Persian Gulf
- C. d. eupompe (Klug, 1829) — Mauritania, Senegal, Gambia, Mali, Burkina Faso, Ivory Coast, Ghana, northern Nigeria, Niger, Chad, Sudan, Ethiopia, Somalia, Kenya, United Arab Emirates, to southern and western Arabia
- C. d. pseudacaste (Butler, 1876) — Ethiopia, Somalia, Uganda, south-eastern Kenya, Tanzania
- C. d. walkeri (Butler, 1884) — south-western Angola, north-western Namibia

== Habits, behaviour, life cycle ==
The larval food plants include the genera Cadaba, Capparis and Maerua (all in the family Capparaceae).

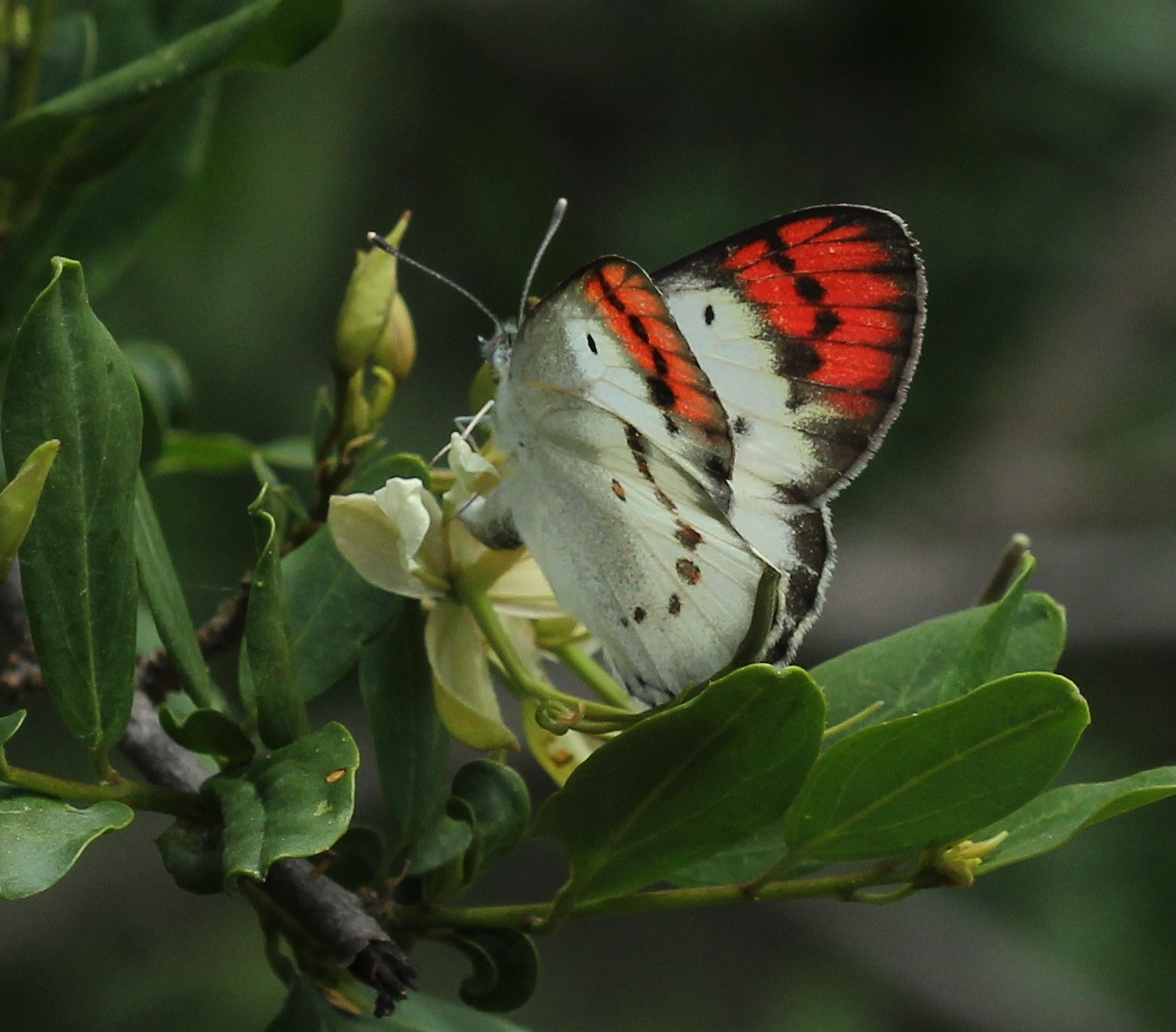
Egg laying

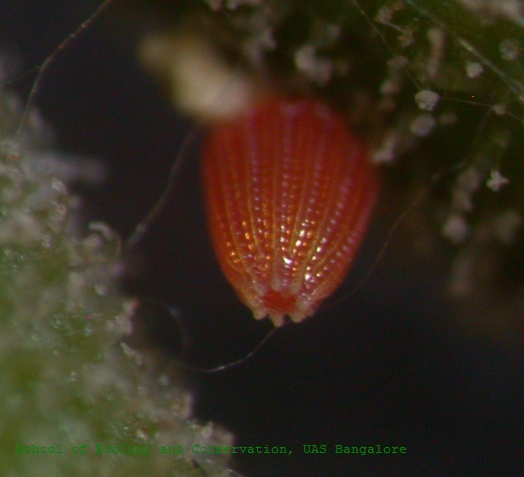
Egg

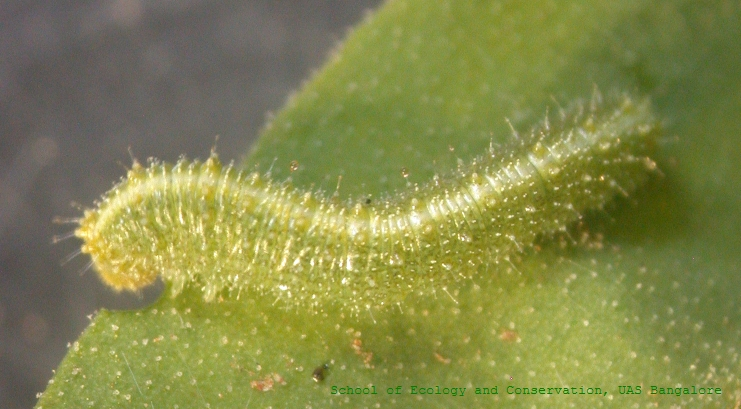
Caterpillar

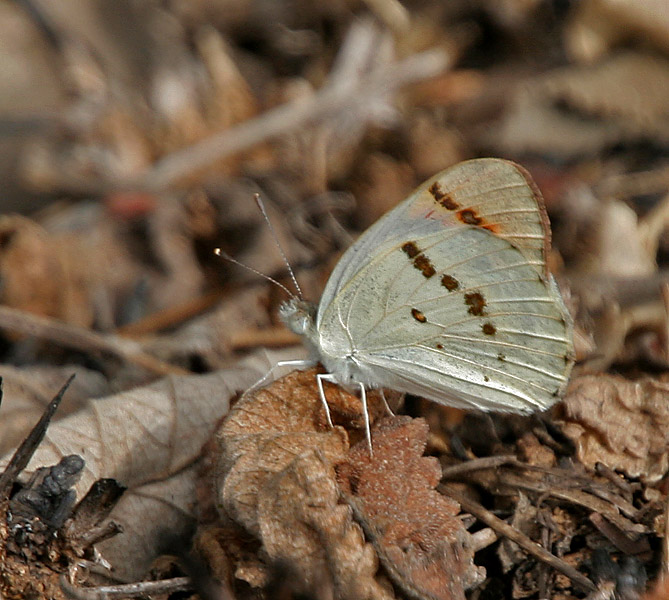
Male in Hyderabad, India

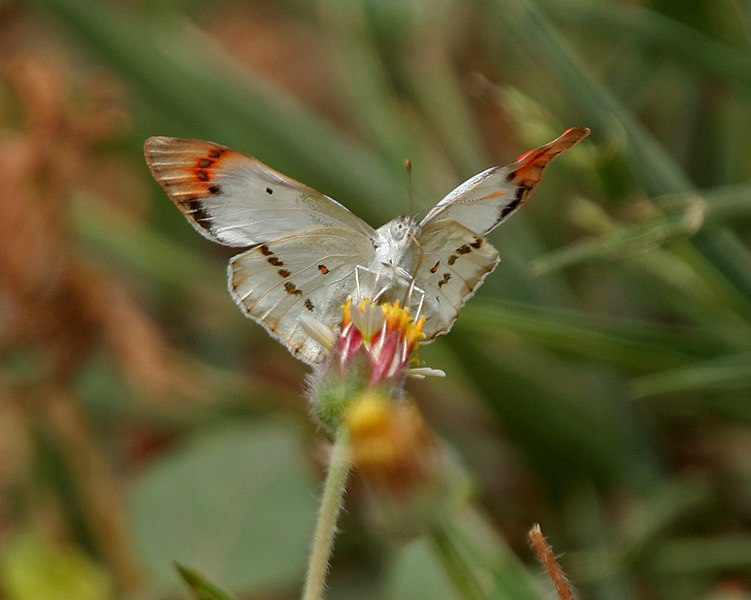
Male on coatbuttons (Tridax procumbens) in Hyderabad, India

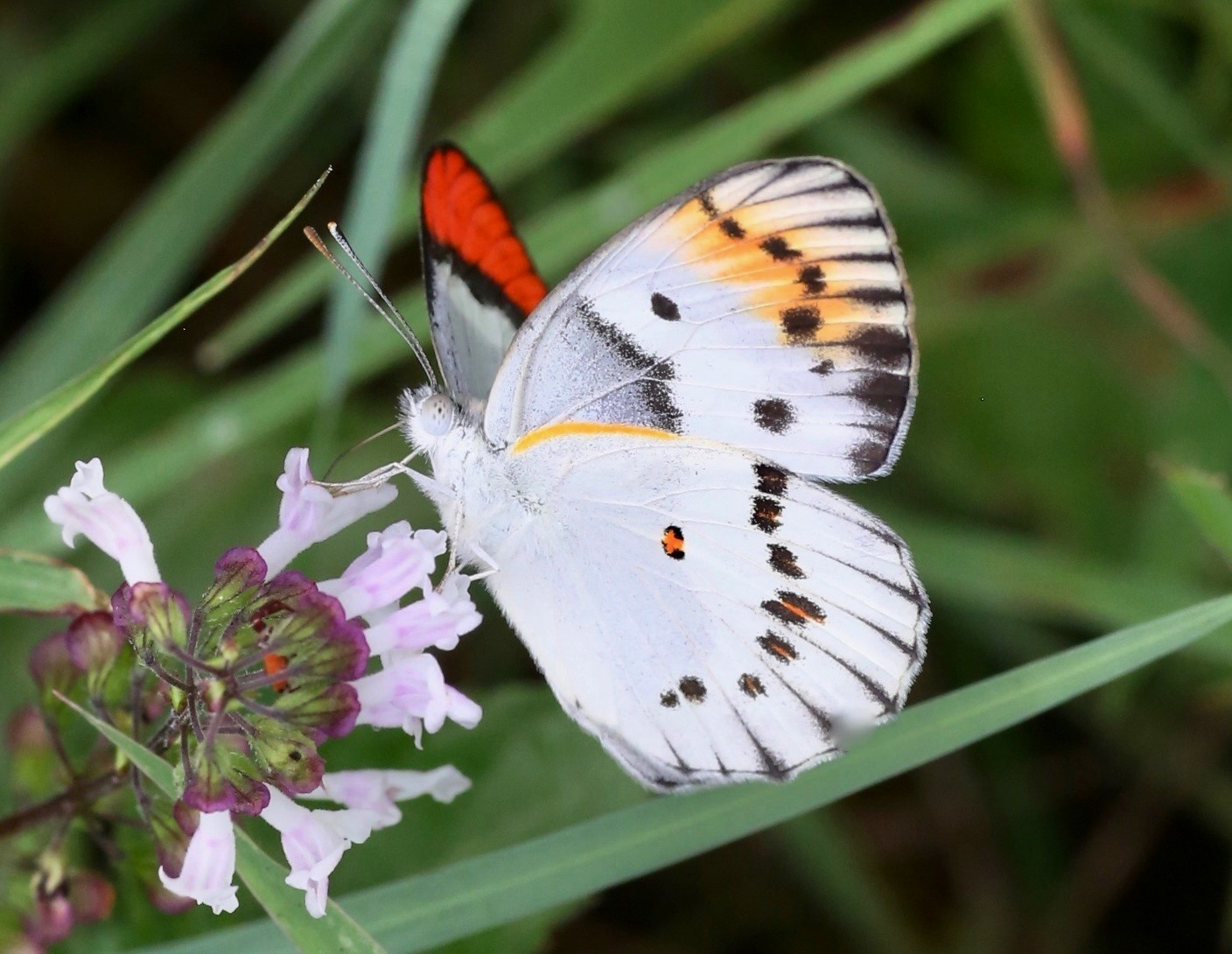
Male imago, C. d. annae, feeding

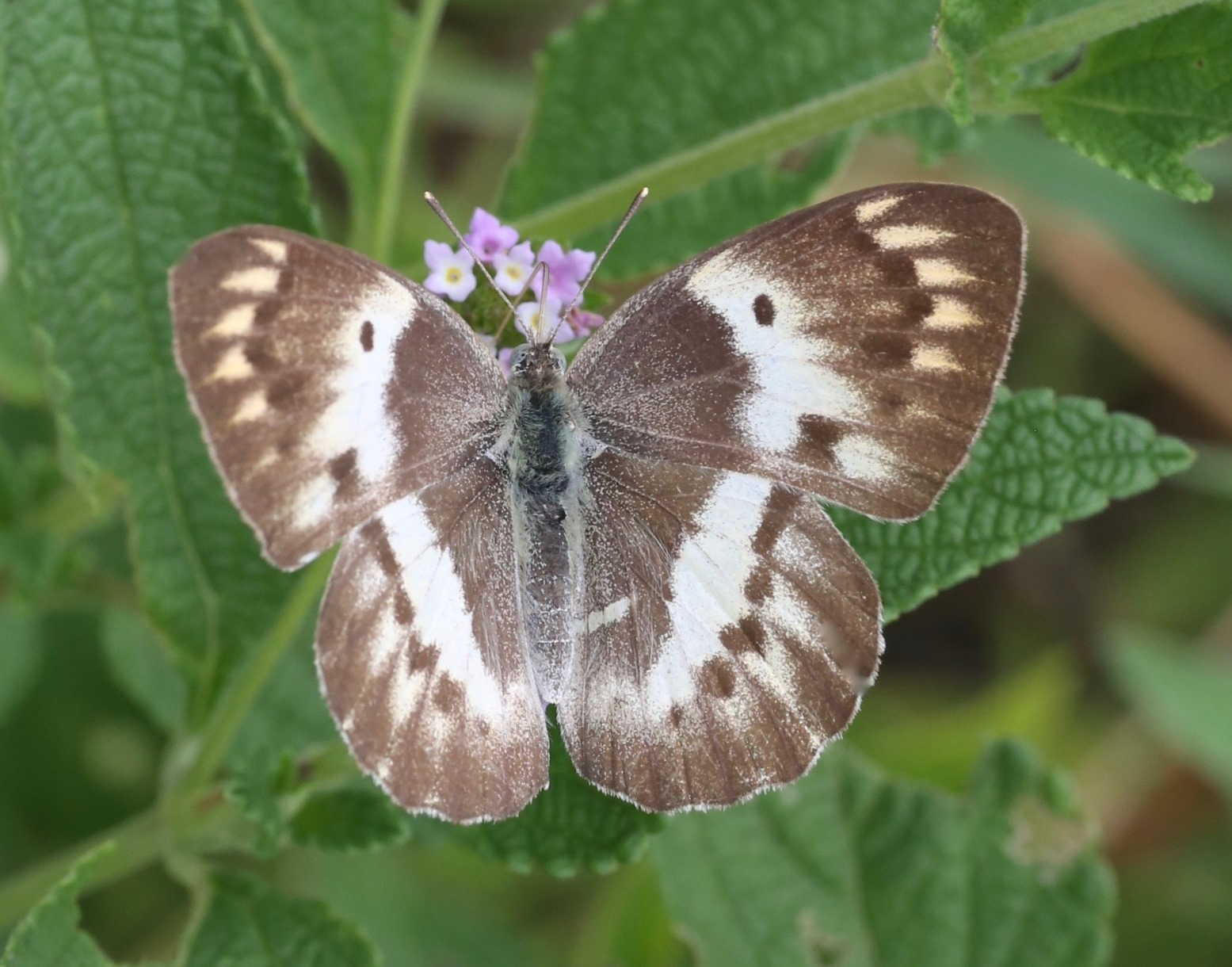
Female imago, C. d. annae, feeding

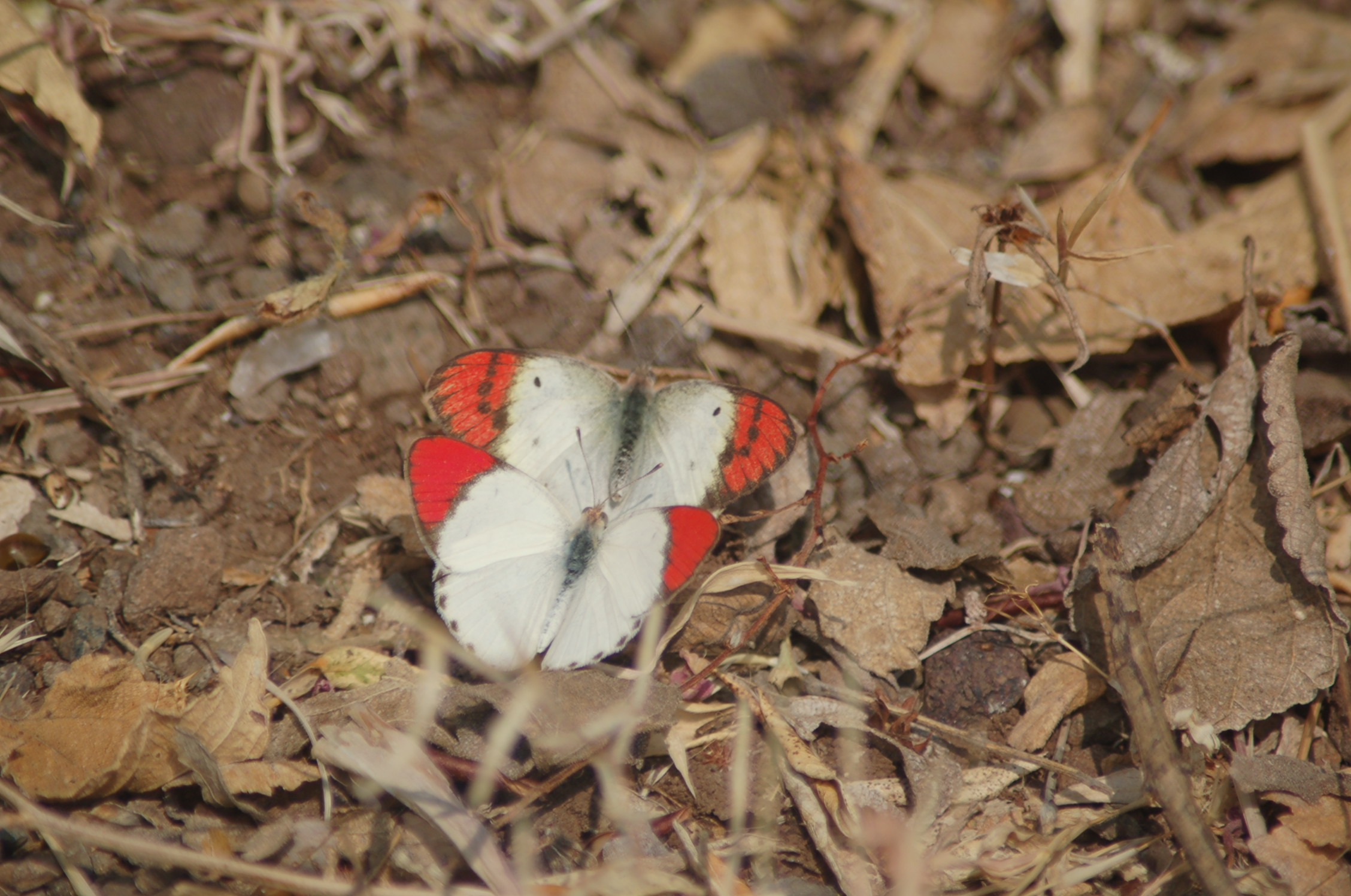
Mating pair
