= Colotis ungemachi =

Scientific classification
- Kingdom: Animalia
- Phylum: Arthropoda
- Class: Insecta
- Order: Lepidoptera
- Family: Pieridae
- Genus: Colotis
- Species: C. ungemachi

Binomial name
- Colotis ungemachi (Le Cerf, 1922)

Synonyms
- Teracolus ungemachi Le Cerf, 1922; Colotis (Colotis) ungemachi

Species of butterfly

Colotis ungemachi is a butterfly in the family Pieridae. It is found in south-western Saudi Arabia, Yemen, north-eastern Ethiopia and possibly Sudan. The species is named after Henri Ungemach.
