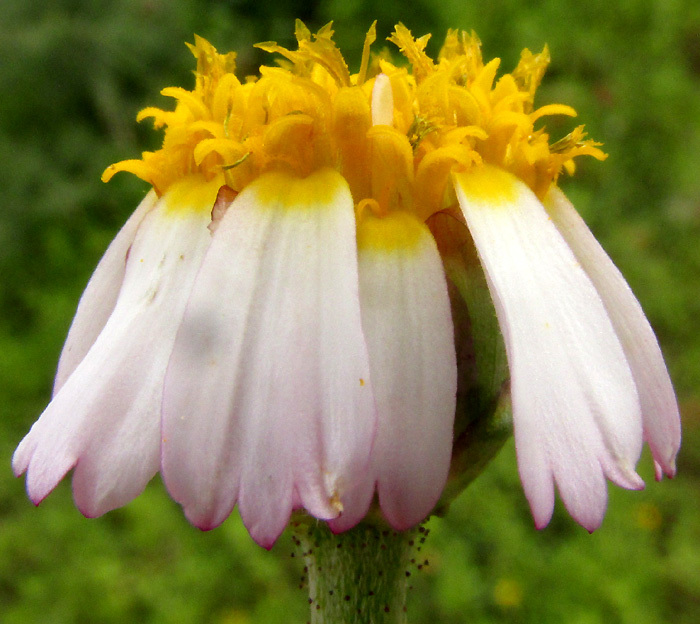
- Tridax rosea flowering head

Scientific classification
- Kingdom: Plantae
- Clade: Tracheophytes
- Clade: Angiosperms
- Clade: Eudicots
- Clade: Asterids
- Order: Asterales
- Family: Asteraceae
- Genus: Tridax
- Species: T. rosea

Binomial name
- Tridax rosea Sch.Bip. ex B.L.Rob. & Greenm. (1896)

= Tridax rosea =

Species of flowering plant

Tridax rosea is a central-Mexican plant bearing no English name for itself, though sometimes all species within the genus Tridax are called coatbuttons or just tridaxes. The species belongs to tribe Millerieae of the family Asteraceae.

== Description ==
Tridax rosea is an herbaceous plant that can be either an annual or a perennial growing up to 60 cm tall (~2 feet) and branching from the base. Beyond that, here are details helping to distinguish it from the 32,000 or so other Aster Family species:

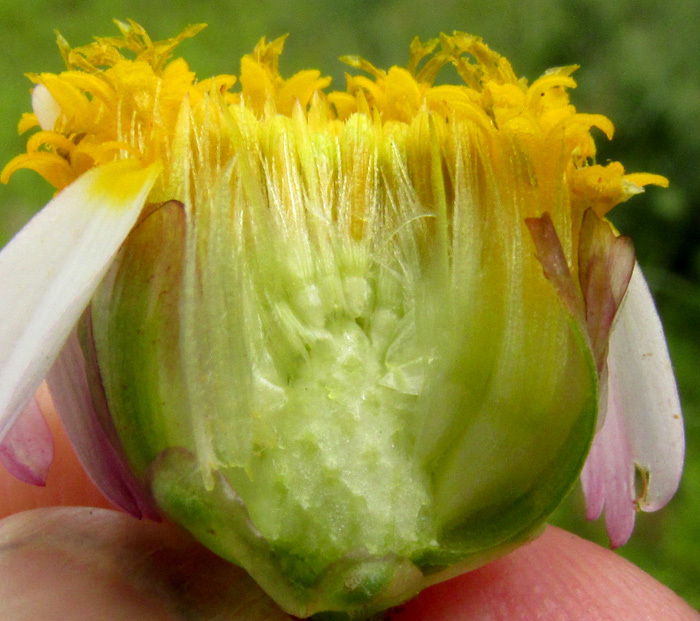
Tridax rosea dissected flower head showing florets atop a cone-shaped involucre

- Leaves arise opposite one another on petioles up to 2 cm long (~¾ inch).
- Leaf blades are deeply 3-lobed or pinnately lobed, the lobes often quite slender with both surfaces covered with hairs, or trichomes.
- Single flowering heads appear at stem tips atop peduncles which are glandular-hairy and up to 25 cm tall (10 inches).
- Flowering heads consist of 5-8 white, rosy or purplish petal-like ray florets along the margins, with the heads' yellow "eyes" composed of 20-40 yellow disk florets.
- The flowering head's florets are held within a goblet-shaped involucre composed of 12-20 scale-like bracts overlapping in 4 or 5 series.
- Within each head, florets stand upon a conical receptacle, with florets separated from one another by scale-like bracts between them.
- Each floret has at its base a developing one-seeded, cypsela-type fruit atop which the corolla's base is surrounded by a pappus consisting of 35-45 white trichomes of varying lengths, each bearing tiny projections; they're "plumose."
- The one-seeded cypselae when mature are blackish, densely covered with fine, silky hairs, shaped like an inverted cone, and up to 3 mm long (~ 1/10 inch).

== Distribution ==
Tridax rosea is endemic just to Mexico City and the central Mexican states of México, Guanajuato, Querétaro, and Hidalgo, at elevations of 1200–2550 meters (~3900–8400 feet).

== Habitat ==
Tridax rosea favors disturbed places, but also appears in dry scrub and oak forests. Pictured on this page is an individual among weeds in an abandoned, rocky, eroding, grazed scrub area at an elevation of about 1900m, (6200 ft).

== Taxonomy ==
In 1896 when Benjamin Lincoln Robinson and Jesse More Greenman revised the genus Tridax, they judged the first publication of the name Tridax rosea by Carl Heinrich "Bipontinus" Schultz as "A good but apparently unedited species, founded by Schultz upon Schaffner's no. 60..." thus not having been properly described. They formally described the species but kept Schultz's name of Tridax rosea, in recognition of Shultz having first recognized the presence of the species. That's the story behind the species' authority usually being stated as "Sch.Bip. ex B.L.Rob. & Greenm."

However, Plants of the World Online, following a 2018 publication, gives Schultz as the only authority, using only "Sch.Bi." Meanwhile, the International Plant Names Index appears to accept both authority statements, providing duplicate citations.

A reason for accepting Schultz's original presentation of the name as a valid description may be that when Schultz published his botanical works often he presented them in the manner of identification keys in which one was led to a taxon by progressively noting its features, in Latin; For example, if there's a pappus of bristles present, then it's not this taxon, but among those which follow. When one arrives at the taxon under consideration, enough necessary identification features will have been gathered possibly to represent an adequate formal description. It's a matter of whether describing a species in this manner is acceptable or not.

== Etymology ==
The genus name Tridax possibly alludes to the 3-lobed leaf bades typical of the first described species.

The species name rosea is of uncertain origin, though it's to be noted that sometimes the petal-like ray-floret corollas of Tridax rosea are rosy colored.

== Gallery ==
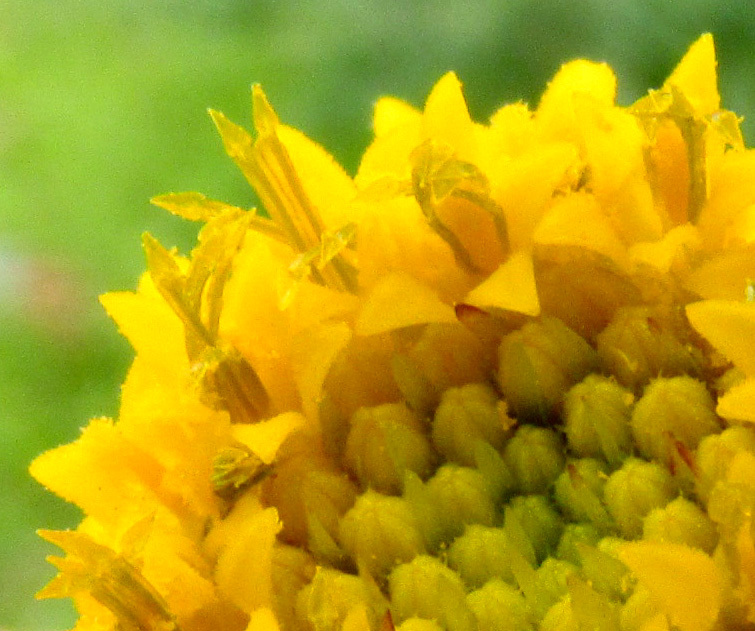
Tridax rosea disk florets in the flowering head's "eye"

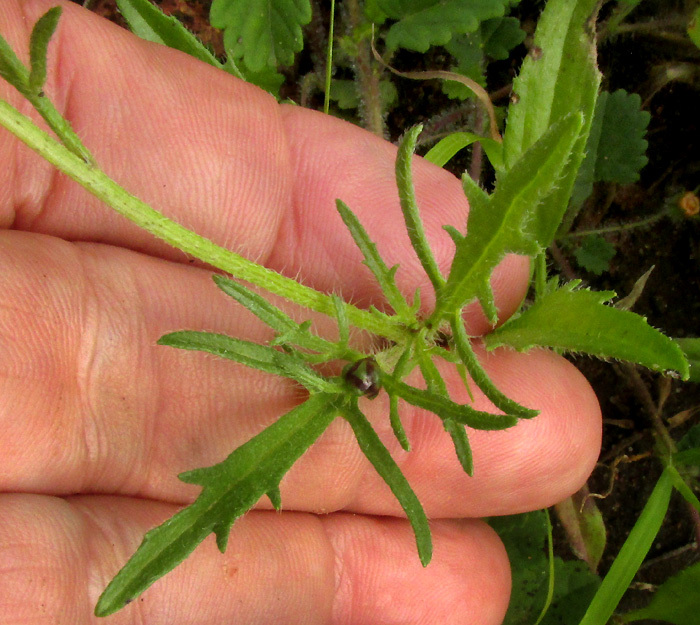
Tridax rosea deeply lobed leaves

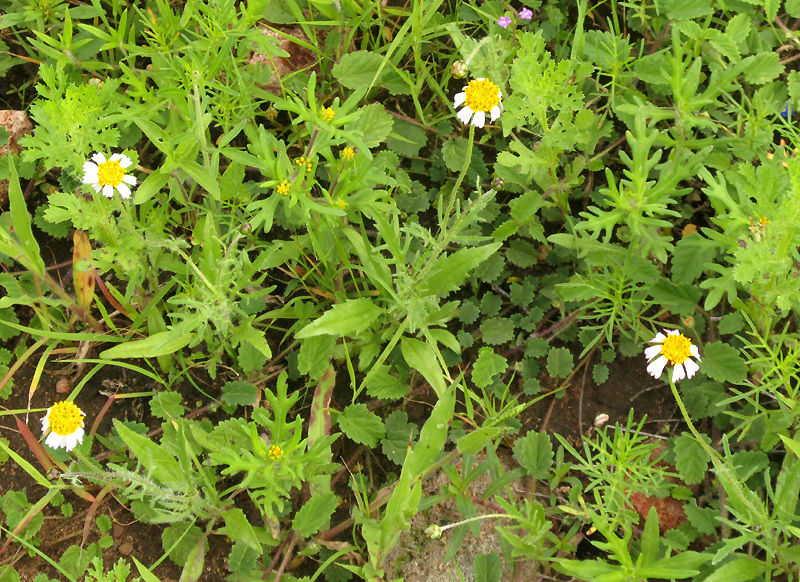
Tridax rosea in weedy disturbed habitat
