= Oreocossus grzimeki =

Scientific classification
- Kingdom: Animalia
- Phylum: Arthropoda
- Clade: Pancrustacea
- Class: Insecta
- Order: Lepidoptera
- Family: Cossidae
- Genus: Oreocossus
- Species: O. grzimeki

Binomial name
- Oreocossus grzimeki Yakovlev, 2011

Species of moth

Oreocossus grzimeki is a species of moth of the family Cossidae. It is found in Kenya.
