= Ungemachite =

General
- Category: Sulfate mineral
- Formula: K_{3}Na_{8}Fe(SO_{4})_{6}(NO_{3})_{2}•6H_{2}O
- IMA symbol: Ugm
- Strunz classification: 7.DG.10
- Dana classification: 32.2.3.1
- Crystal system: Trigonal
- Crystal class: R3̅
- Unit cell: a = 10.898 Å, c = 24.989 Å

Identification
- Colour: pale yellow
- Fracture: uneven
- Tenacity: brittle
- Mohs scale hardness: 2 1/2
- Luster: vitreous
- Density: 2.287
- Optical properties: uniaxial (−)
- Refractive index: nω = 1.502 nε = 1.449
- Birefringence: 0.053

Ungemachite is a rare mineral (K_{3}Na_{8}Fe(SO_{4})_{6}(NO_{3})_{2} · 6H_{2}O) known from only two locations - a copper deposit in the Atacama Desert (Chile) and in the New Cobar copper–gold deposit, New South Wales (Australia). The formation of Ungemachite requires the presence of nitrate minerals, which requires arid conditions, as well as sulfates. It has been synthesized under laboratory conditions and its properties have been studied. The mineral was described in 1936 and is named after the mineralogist Henri Ungemach.
