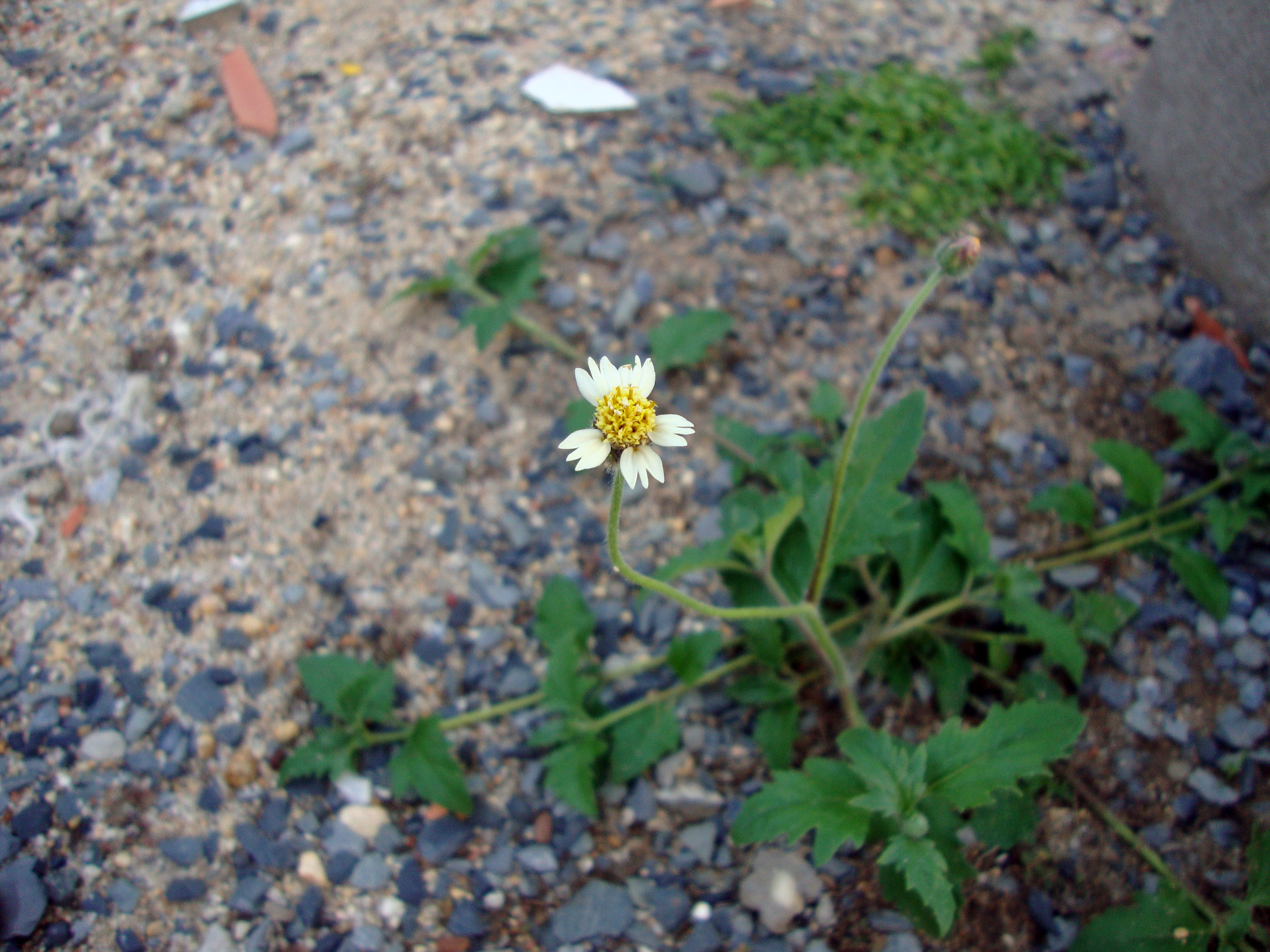
- Tridax procumbens

Scientific classification
- Kingdom: Plantae
- Clade: Embryophytes
- Clade: Tracheophytes
- Clade: Angiosperms
- Clade: Eudicots
- Clade: Asterids
- Order: Asterales
- Family: Asteraceae
- Subfamily: Asteroideae
- Tribe: Millerieae
- Subtribe: Galinsoginae
- Genus: Tridax; L.

Type species
- Tridax procumbens L.

Synonyms
- Ptilostephium Kunth; Mandonia Wedd.; Sogalgina Cass.; Balbisia Willd. 1803, rejected homonym not Cav. 1804 (Francoaceae) nor DC. 1833 (Asteraceae); Bartolia Adans.; Bartolina Adans.; Carphostephium Cass.; Galinsogea Kunth 1818, illegitimate homonym not Willd. 1803

= Tridax =

Genus of flowering plants

Tridax is a genus of flowering plants in the family Asteraceae.

Tridax is native primarily to the tropical regions of North and South America. Tridax procumbens has become naturalized in the southern United States and is considered a noxious weed in some places.

Species

- Tridax angustifolia Spruce ex Benth. & Hook.f. - Ecuador, Peru
- Tridax balbisioides (Kunth) A.Gray - Guanajuato
- Tridax bicolor A.Gray - Chihuahua
- Tridax bilabiata A.M.Powell - Guerrero
- Tridax boliviensis (Wedd.) R.E.Fr. - Bolivia
- Tridax brachylepis Hemsl. - Oaxaca
- Tridax cajamarcensis H.Rob. - Peru
- Tridax candidissima A.Gray - San Luis Potosí
- Tridax coronopifolia (Kunth) Hemsl. - widespread from Tamaulipas to Chiapas
- Tridax dubia Rose - Colima
- Tridax erecta A.Gray
- Tridax hintonii (B.L.Turner & A.M.Powell) D.J.Keil, Luckow & Pinkava - Michoacán
- Tridax hintoniorum B.L.Turner - Nuevo León
- Tridax luisana Brandegee - Puebla, Oaxaca
- Tridax mexicana A.M.Powell - Guerrero, Oaxaca, Jalisco, México State, Veracruz, Nayarit, Michoacán
- Tridax moorei B.L.Rob. - Hidalgo
- Tridax oaxacana B.L.Turner - Oaxaca
- Tridax obovata Turcz. - Oaxaca
- Tridax oligantha C.E.Anderson & Beaman
- Tridax palmeri A.Gray - San Luis Potosí
- Tridax platyphylla B.L.Rob. - Jalisco
- Tridax procumbens (L.) L. - Veracruz; widespread invasive
- Tridax purpurea S.F.Blake - Guatemala, Chiapas
- Tridax rosea Sch.Bip. ex B.L.Rob. & Greenm. - Hidalgo, D.F.
- Tridax tambensis Hieron. - Peru, Ecuador
- Tridax tenuifolia Rose - Chihuahua
- Tridax trilobata (Cav.) Hemsl. - Michoacán, México State
- Tridax venezuelensis Aristeg. & Cuatrec. - Venezuela
- Tridax yecorana B.L.Turner - eastern Sonora in Sierra Madre Occidental

formerly included

see Calea Layia Sabazia

- Tridax accedens - Calea verticillata
- Tridax ehrenbergii - Sabazia sarmentosa
- Tridax gaillardioides - Layia gaillardioides
- Tridax verticillata - Calea verticillata
