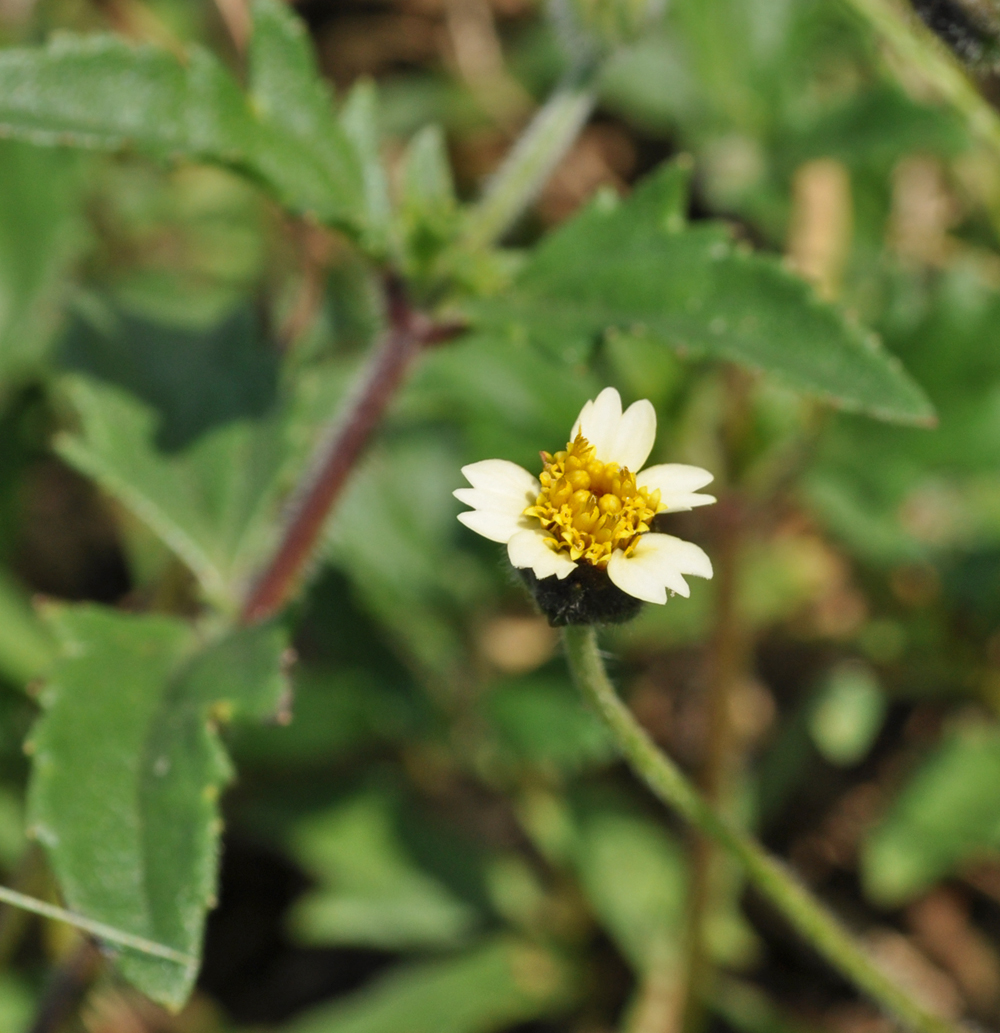

Scientific classification
- Kingdom: Plantae
- Clade: Tracheophytes
- Clade: Angiosperms
- Clade: Eudicots
- Clade: Asterids
- Order: Asterales
- Family: Asteraceae
- Genus: Tridax
- Species: T. procumbens

Binomial name
- Tridax procumbens L.

Synonyms
- Amellus pedunculatus Ortega ex Willd.; Balbisia canescens Rich. ex Pers.; Balbisia divaricata Cass.; Balbisia elongata Willd.; Balbisia pedunculata Hoffmanns.; Chrysanthemum procumbens (L.) Sessé & Moc.

= Tridax procumbens =

Species of flowering plant

Tridax procumbens, commonly known as coatbuttons or tridax daisy, is a species of flowering plant in the family Asteraceae. It is best known as a widespread weed and pest plant. It is native to the tropical Americas including Mexico, but it has been introduced to tropical, subtropical, and mild temperate regions worldwide. It is listed as a noxious weed in the United States and has pest status in nine states.

== Common names ==
Its common names include coatbuttons and tridax daisy in English.

Names in other European languages include cadillo chisaca in Spanish and herbe caille in French.

Among Indo-Aryan languages, it is known in Sanskrit as jayanti veda (जयंती वेद) or avanti. In Gujarati it is called ghajadvu or ghaburi (ઘાબુરી). In Assamese it is known as bikhalyakarani. In Hindi it is known as ghamra, and in Urdu it is called zagh mai hayat. In Bengali it is called tridhara (ত্রিধারা). In Marathi it is called kambarmodi, jakhamjudi or tantani (कंबरमोडी, जखमजुडी and टनटनी, respectively).

Among Dravidian languages, it is called jayanthi (ಜಯoತಿ) in Kannada, while it is known in Malayalam by the names kumminnippacha (കുമ്മിനിന്നിപാച്ച), kurikootticheera (കുറികോട്ടിച്ചിചിറ), muriyampachila (മുരിയമ്പാചില), odiyancheera (ഒഡിയൻ‌ചിറ), railpoochedi (റൈലാപൂച്ചെഡി), sanipoovu (ഷാനിപോവ്), thelkuthi (തെക്കുത്തി) or chiravanakku (ചിരവനാക്ക്).

In Oriya, it is called bishalya karani (ବିଶଲ୍ୟକରଣୀ). In Telugu, it is called gayapaaku (గాయపాకు), gaddi chemanthi (గడ్డి చామంతి), or balapaaku (బలపాకు). In Tamil it is called vettukaaya poondu, thatha poo or kinatruppasan (கிணற்றுப்பாசான்) and it is called kurunagala daisy in Sinhala.

It is called kotobukigiku in Japanese and tīn túkkæ (ตีนตุ๊กแก; 'gecko feet') in Thai.

== Description ==
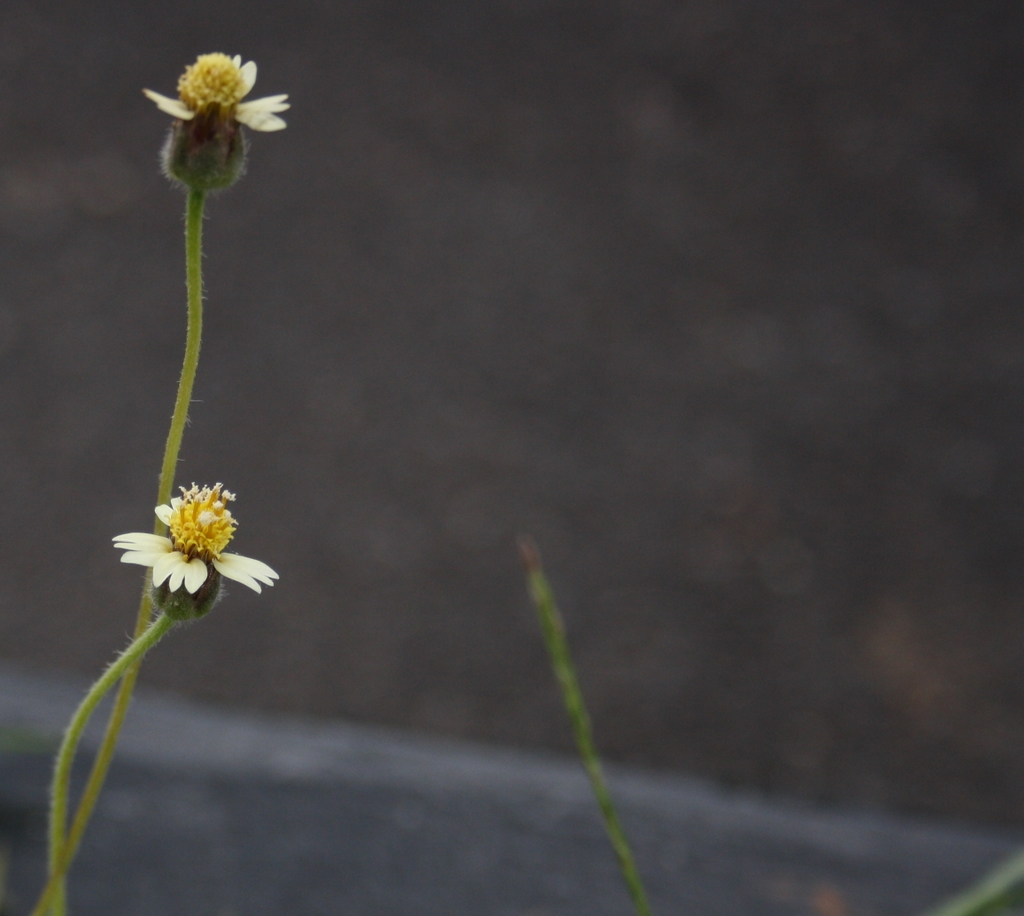
Tridax procumbens stalks in Hyderabad, Andhra Pradesh.

The plant bears daisy-like yellow-centered white or yellow flowers with three-toothed ray florets. The leaves are toothed and generally arrowhead-shaped. Calyx is represented by scales or reduced to pappus.

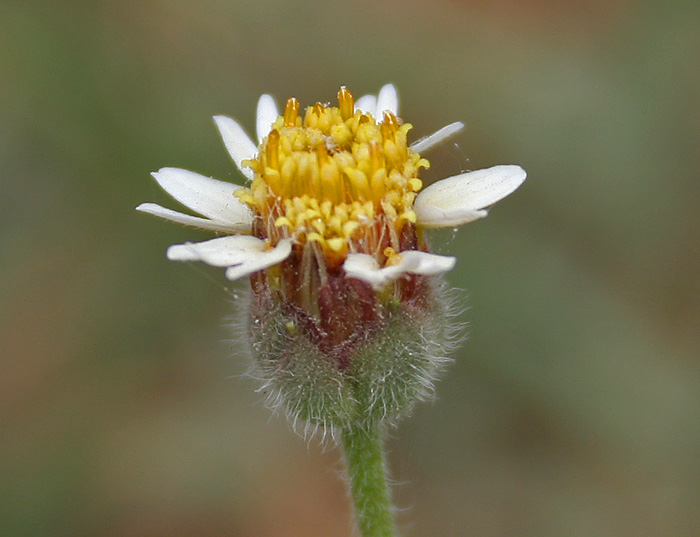
Flower in Hyderabad.

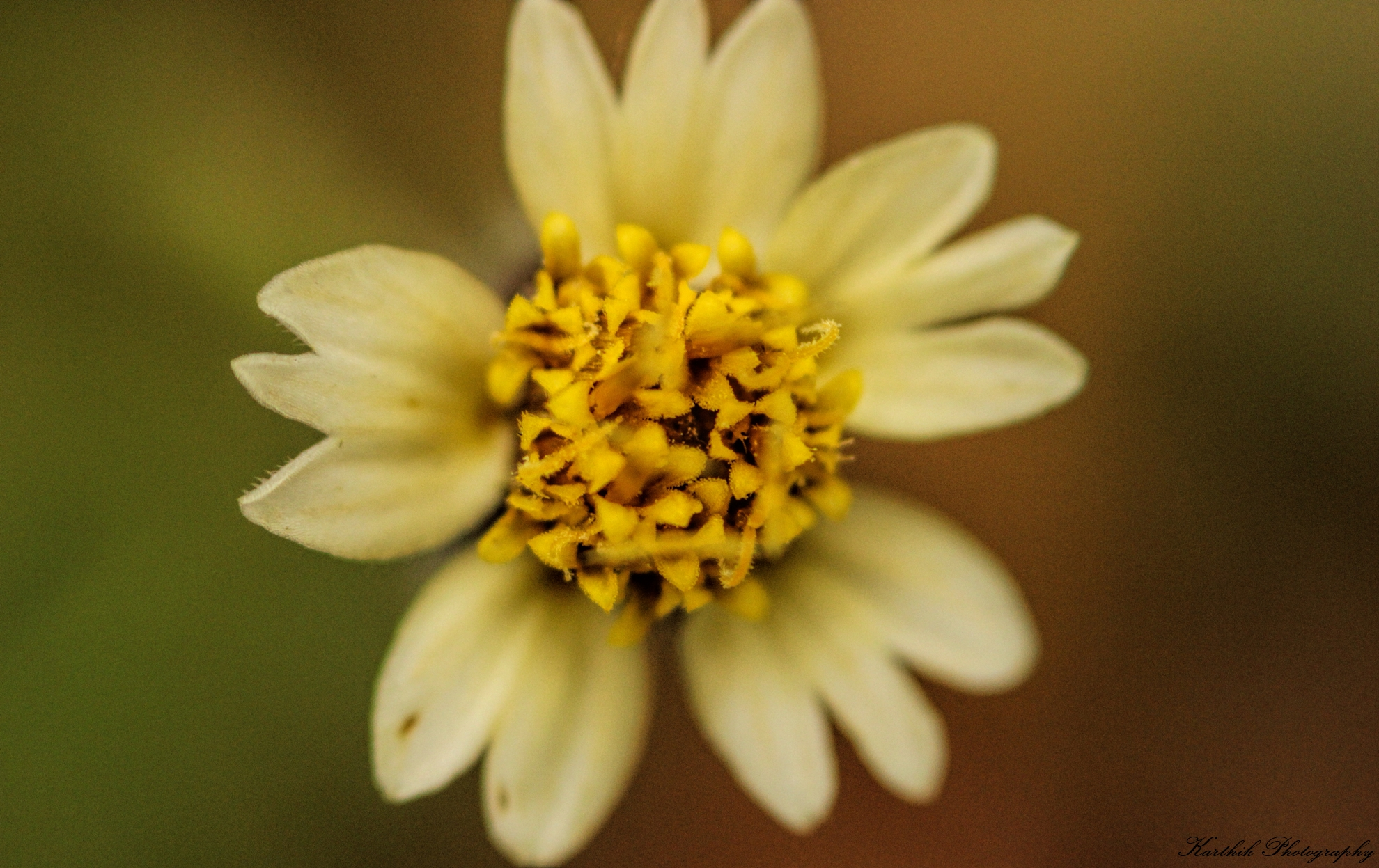
Top view of the flower

Its fruit is a hard achene covered with stiff hairs and having a feathery, plumelike white pappus at one end. The plant is invasive in part because it produces so many of these achenes, up to 1500 per plant, and each achene can catch the wind in its pappus and be carried some distance. This plant can be found in fields, meadows, croplands, disturbed areas, lawns, and roadsides in areas with tropical or semi-tropical climates. It is listed in the United States as a Noxious Weed and regulated under the Federal Noxious Weed Act.

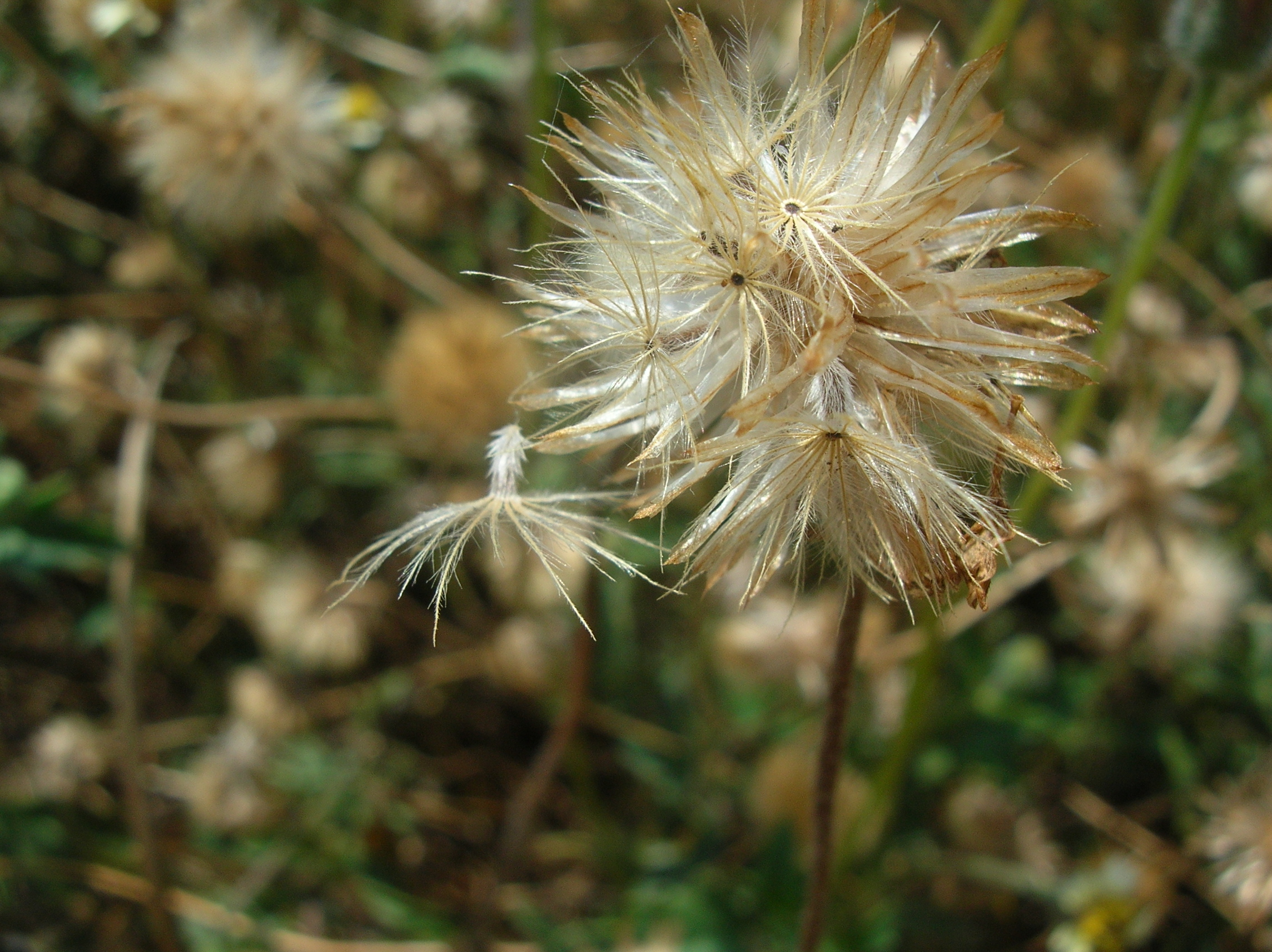
Ripe fruit with winged achenes ready for wind-dispersal.

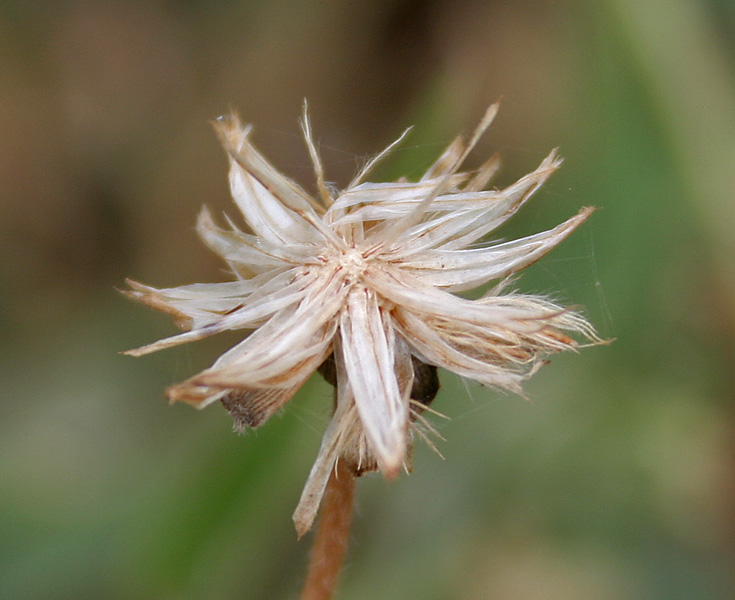
Residual fruit after achene dispersal.

== Use in traditional medicine ==
Traditionally, Tridax procumbens has been in use in India for wound healing and as an anticoagulant, antifungal, and insect repellent. Animal studies have found that Tridax procumbens Linn. has anti-inflammatory and analgesic effects. It is also used as a treatment for boils, blisters, and cuts by local healers in parts of India. It's leaves extract are useful for stopping the bleeding after leech bites.

Younger leaves of Tridax procumbens can be easily crushed by hand to yield a deep green juice, which is directly dripped onto wounds to arrest bleeding. Anectodal evidence also suggests the juice is effective in curing nail fungus.

== Chemical constituents ==
The flavonoid procumbenetin has been isolated from the aerial parts of Tridax procumbens. Other chemical compounds isolated from the plant include alkyl esters, sterols, pentacyclic triterpenes, fatty acids, and polysaccharides. Several main active chemical compounds were found to be present. But toxicological knowledge is scarce and more research described to be needed on this plant.

== Gallery ==
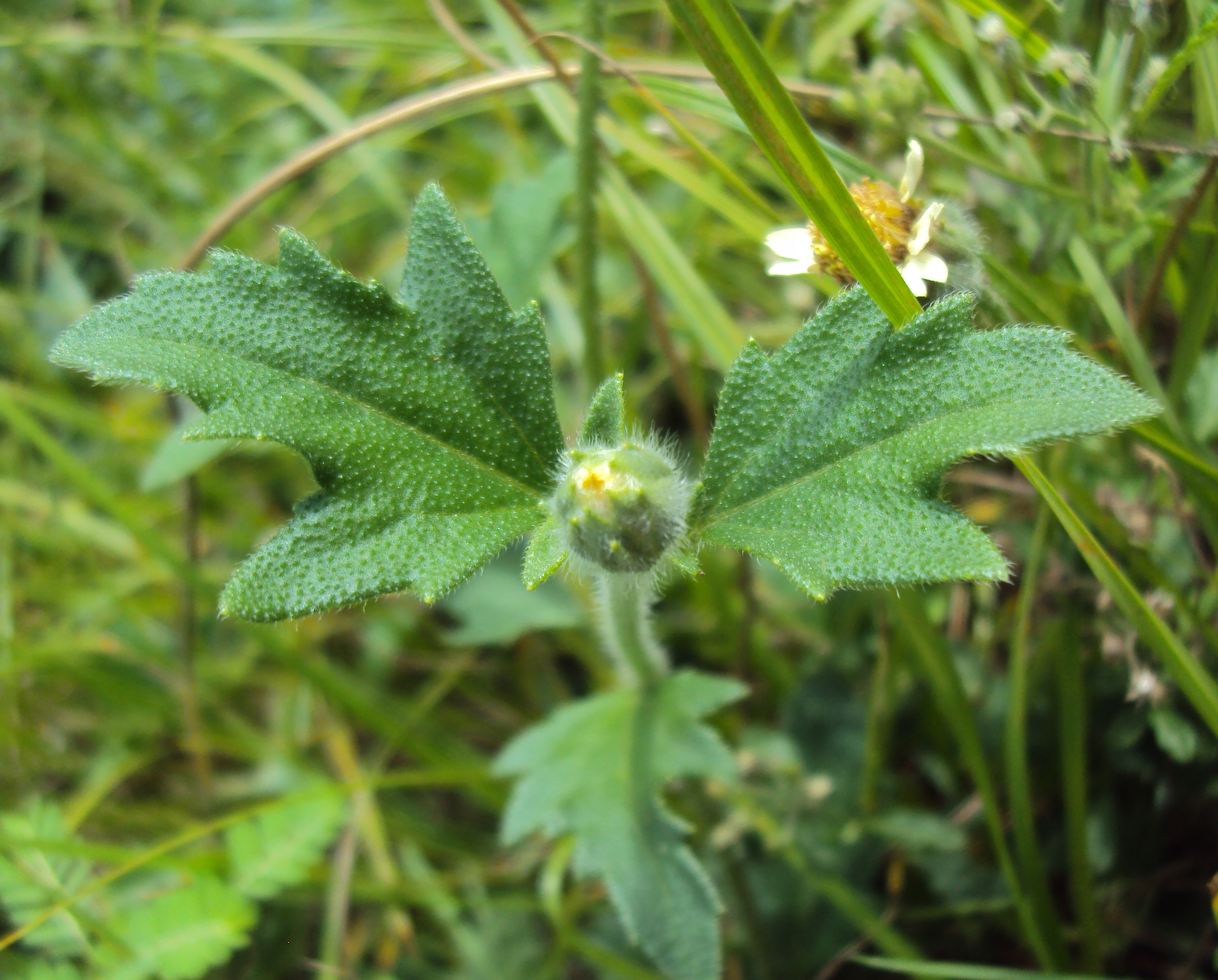
Flower bud and leaves of Tridax procumbens

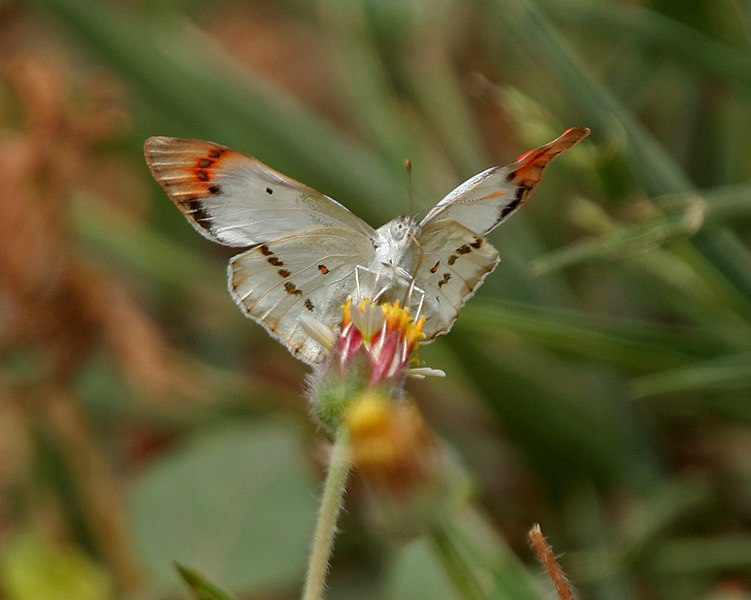
Crimson Tip Colotis danae in Hyderabad, India. Coat buttons are widely visited by butterflies.

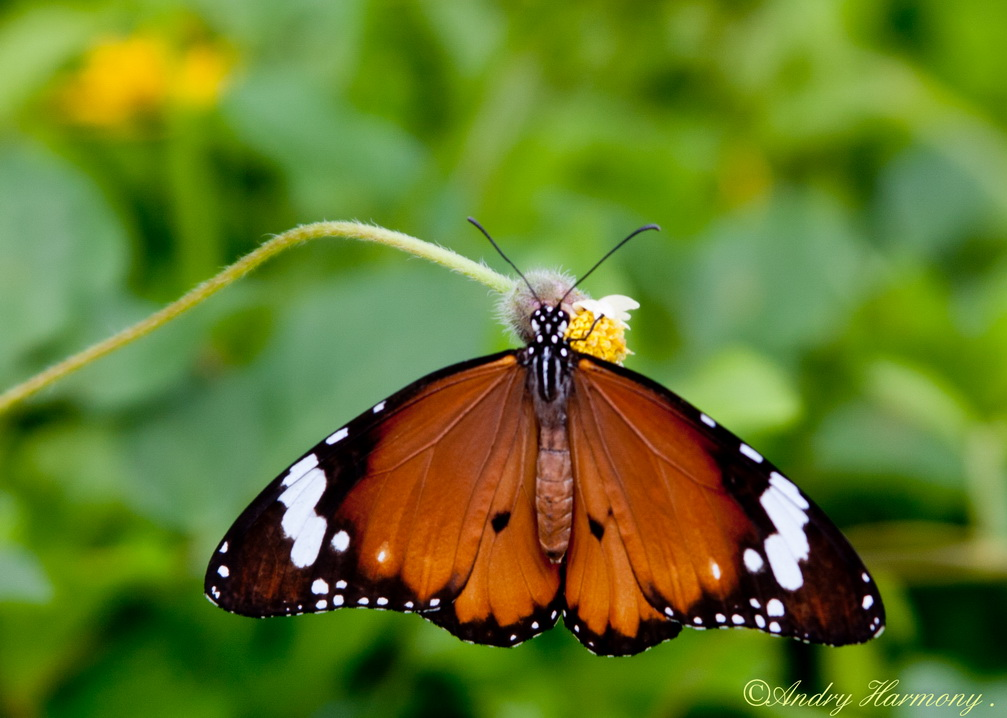
Danaus chrysippus feeding on Tridax procumbens in Bandung West Java, Indonesia.

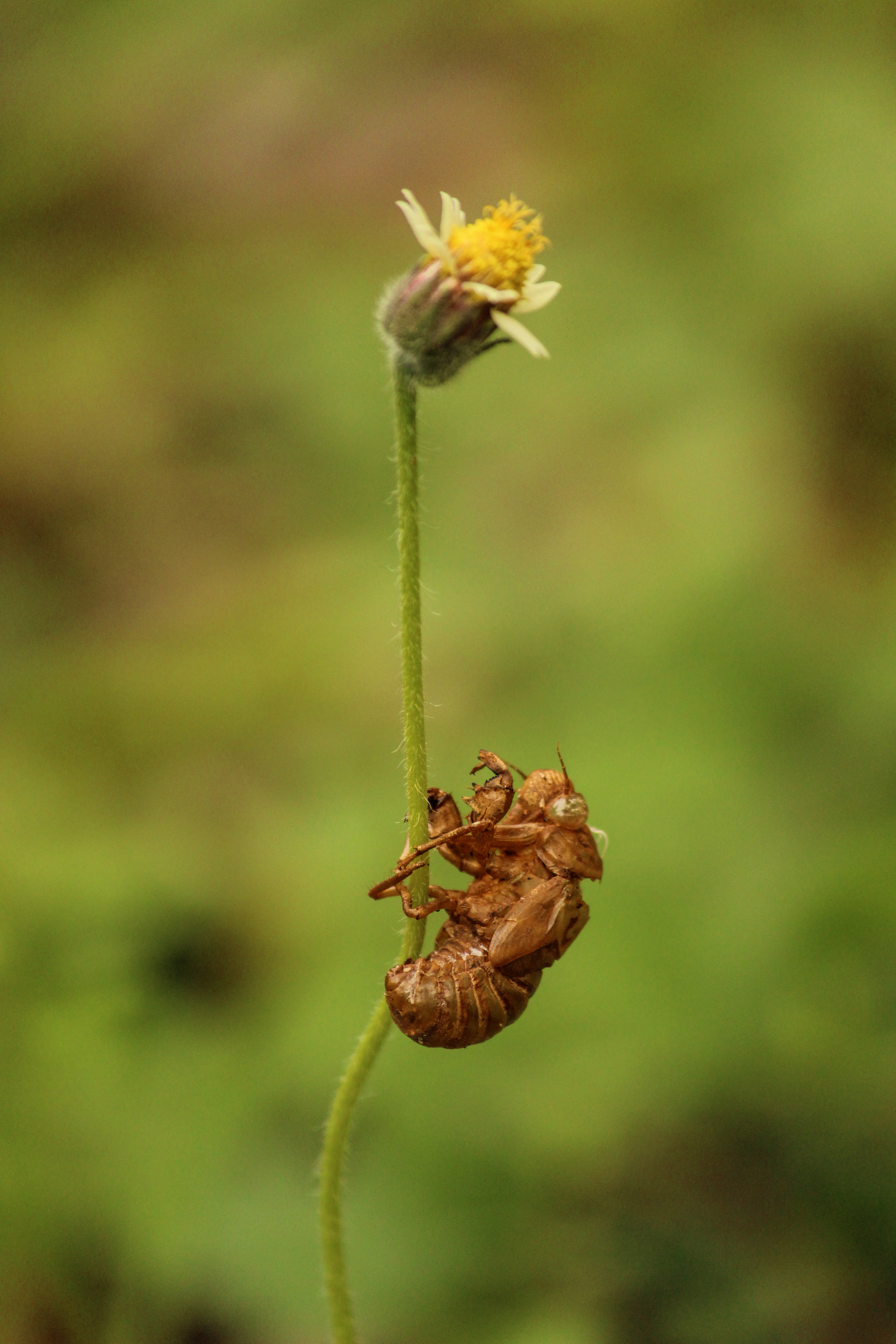
Exoskeleton of cicada clinging to Tridax procumbens stem.

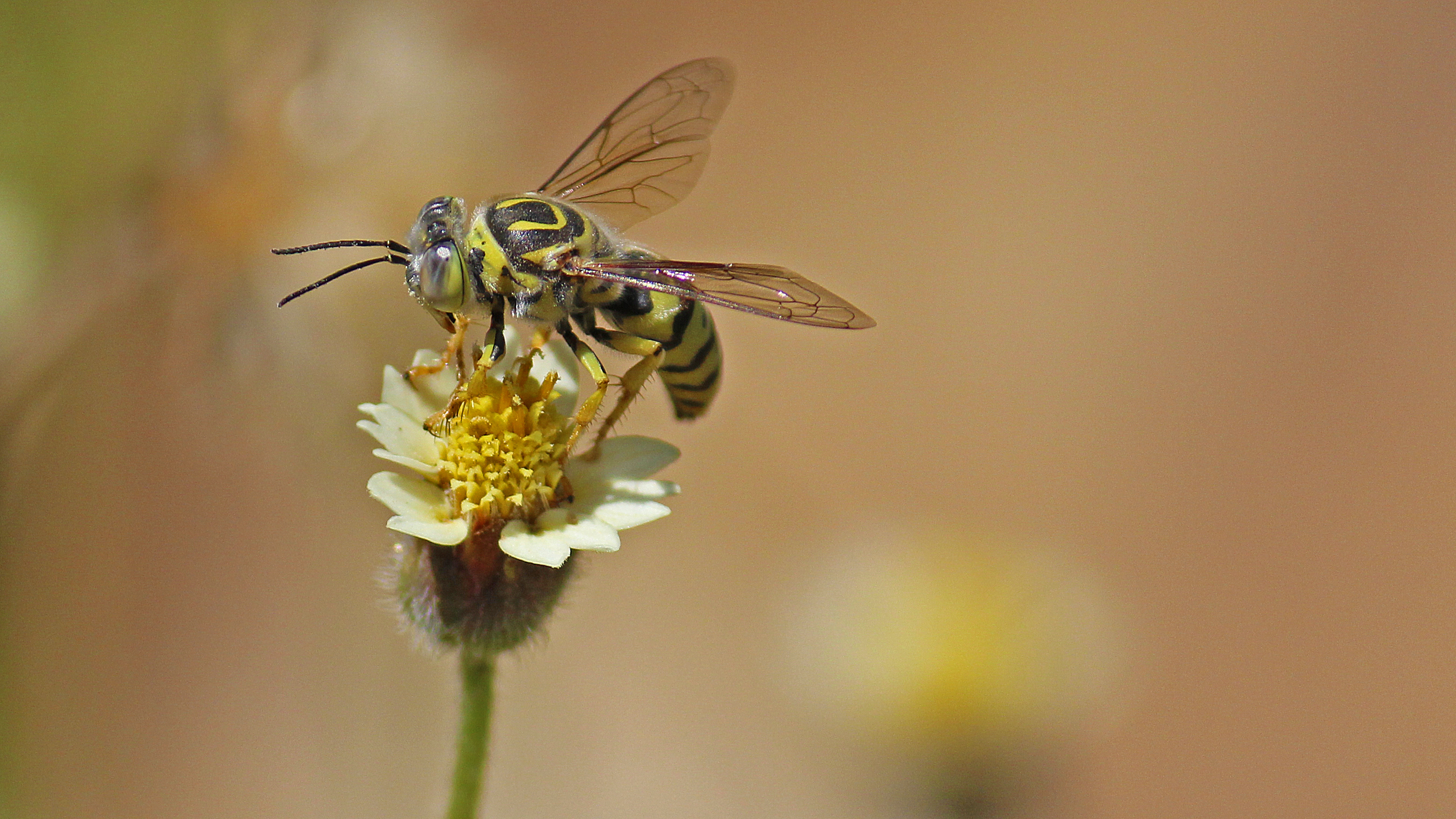
Wasp feeding the nectar of Tridax procumbens

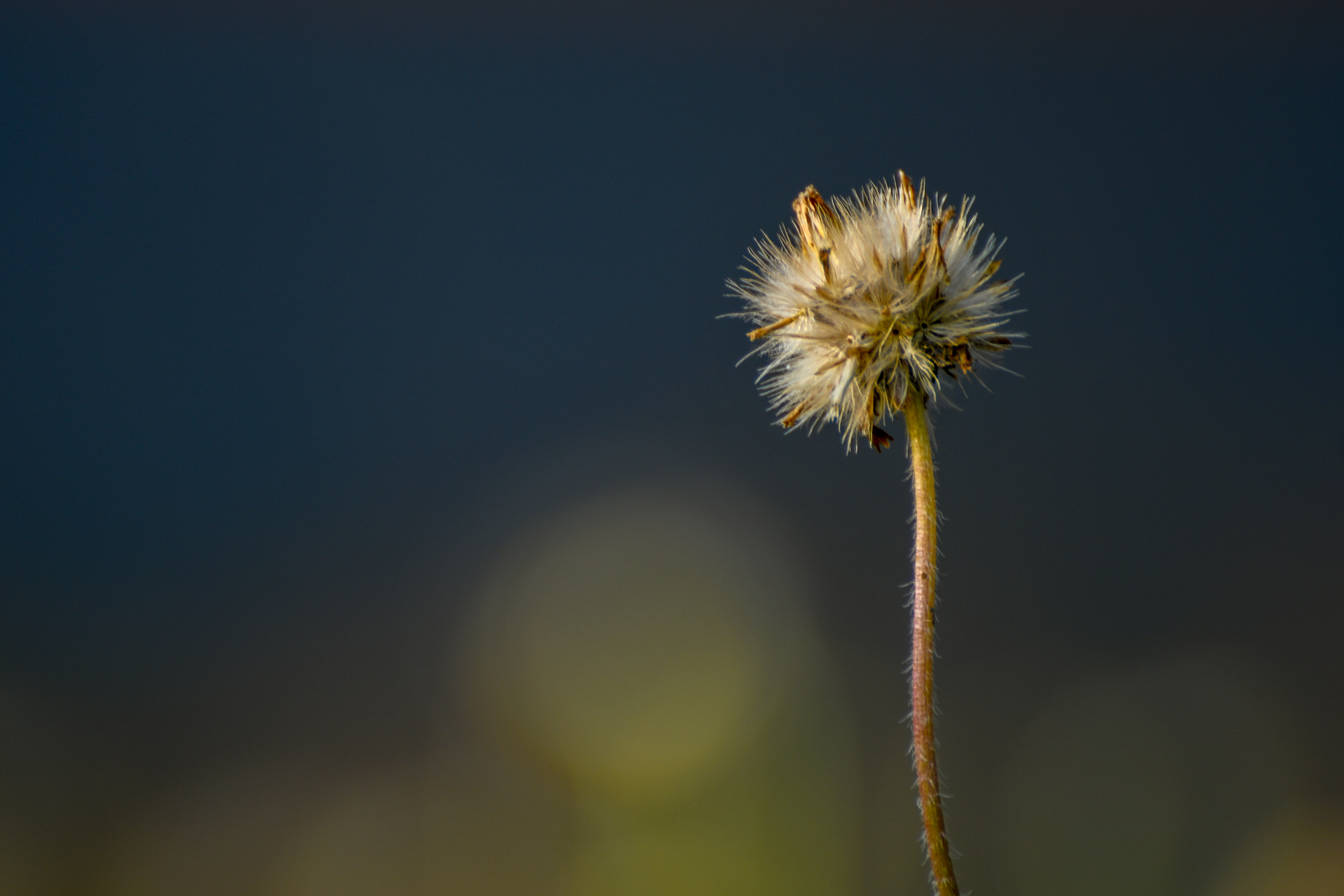
Ripe fruit with winged achenes
