= List of butterflies of Kenya =

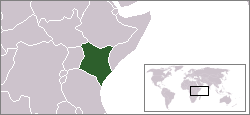
Location of Kenya

This is a list of butterflies of Kenya. About 559 species are known from Kenya, 34 of which are endemic.

== Papilionidae ==
=== Papilioninae ===
==== Papilionini ====
- Papilio chrapkowskii Ernst Suffert, 1904
- Papilio desmondi desmondi van Someren, 1939
- Papilio desmondi teita van Someren, 1960
- Papilio hornimani Distant, 1879
- Papilio cynorta Fabricius, 1793
- Papilio constantinus constantinus Ward, 1871
- Papilio constantinus lecerfi Koçak, 1996
- Papilio echerioides joiceyi Gabriel, 1945
- Papilio echerioides kiellandi Clifton & Collins, 1997
- Papilio echerioides nyiro Carcasson, 1962
- Papilio echerioides wertheri Karsch, 1898
- Papilio nobilis nobilis Rogenhofer, 1891
- Papilio nobilis crippsianus Stoneham, 1936
- Papilio lormieri Distant, 1874
- Papilio ophidicephalus Oberthür, 1878
- Papilio phorcas roscoei Cramer, 1775

==== Leptocercini ====
- Graphium antheus (Cramer, 1779)
- Graphium kirbyi (Hewitson, 1872)
- Graphium polistratus (Grose-Smith, 1889)
- Graphium colonna (Ward, 1873)
- Graphium porthaon porthaon (Hewitson, 1865)
- Graphium porthaon mackiei Collins & Larsen, 1991
- Graphium philonoe philonoe (Ward, 1873)
- Graphium philonoe whalleyi (Talbot, 1929)

== Pieridae ==
=== Coliadinae ===
- Eurema floricola leonis (Butler, 1886)

=== Pierinae ===
- Colotis antevippe zera (Lucas, 1852)
- Colotis aurigineus (Butler, 1883)
- Colotis aurora evarne (Klug, 1829)
- Colotis auxo (Lucas, 1852)
- Colotis celimene (Lucas, 1852)
- Colotis chrysonome (Klug, 1829)
- Colotis daira jacksoni (Sharpe, 1890)
- Colotis daira stygia (Felder & Felder, 1865)
- Colotis danae eupompe (Klug, 1829)
- Colotis danae pseudacaste (Butler, 1876)
- Colotis eunoma flotowi (Suffert, 1904)
- Colotis evagore antigone (Boisduval, 1836)
- Colotis evenina casta (Gerstaecker, 1871)
- Colotis evenina sipylus (Swinhoe, 1884)
- Colotis evenina xantholeuca (Sharpe, 1904)
- Colotis halimede restricta Talbot, 1939
- Colotis hetaera hetaera (Gerstaecker, 1871)
- Colotis hetaera lorti (Sharpe, 1896)
- Colotis hildebrandtii (Staudinger, 1884)
- Colotis incretus (Butler, 1881)
- Colotis phisadia rothschildi (Sharpe, 1898)
- Colotis phisadia vagus d'Abrera, 1980
- Colotis pleione heliocaustus (Butler, 1886)
- Colotis protomedia (Klug, 1829)
- Colotis regina (Trimen, 1863)
- Colotis rogersi (Dixey, 1915)
- Colotis venosa (Staudinger, 1885)
- Colotis vesta catachrysops (Butler, 1878)
- Colotis vesta hanningtoni (Butler, 1883)
- Colotis vestalis castalis (Staudinger, 1884)
- Eronia leda (Boisduval, 1847)
- Pinacopterix eriphia melanarge (Butler, 1886)
- Nepheronia buquetii (Boisduval, 1836)

==== Pierini ====
- Appias lasti (Grose-Smith, 1889)
- Appias phaola isokani (Grose-Smith, 1889)
- Pontia distorta (Butler, 1886)
- Pontia glauconome Klug, 1829
- Pontia helice johnstonii (Crowley, 1887)
- Mylothris agathina (Cramer, 1779)
- Mylothris jacksoni jacksoni Sharpe, 1891
- Mylothris jacksoni cephisus Talbot, 1946
- Mylothris jacksoni sagitta Clifton, 1980
- Mylothris kilimensis Kielland, 1990
- Mylothris kiwuensis rhodopoides Talbot, 1944
- Mylothris sagala narcissus Butler, 1888
- Mylothris sagala neumanni Sharpe, 1896
- Mylothris schumanni Suffert, 1904
- Dixeia charina liliana (Grose-Smith, 1889)
- Dixeia charina pulverulenta (Dixey, 1929)
- Dixeia doxo costata Talbot, 1943
- Dixeia orbona vidua (Butler, 1900)
- Dixeia pigea (Boisduval, 1836)
- Dixeia spilleri (Spiller, 1884)
- Belenois gidica abyssinica (Lucas, 1852)
- Belenois margaritacea margaritacea Sharpe, 1891
- Belenois margaritacea somereni (Talbot, 1928)
- Belenois margaritacea kenyensis (Joicey & Talbot, 1927)
- Belenois rubrosignata peeli Dixey, 1900
- Belenois solilucis loveni (Aurivillius, 1921)
- Belenois zochalia (Boisduval, 1836)

== Lycaenidae ==
=== Miletinae ===
==== Liphyrini ====
- Aslauga orientalis Cottrell, 1981
- Aslauga purpurascens Holland, 1890

==== Miletini ====
- Lachnocnema bibulus (Fabricius, 1793)
- Lachnocnema pseudobibulus Libert, 1996
- Lachnocnema sosia Libert, 1996
- Lachnocnema durbani Trimen & Bowker, 1887
- Lachnocnema emperamus (Snellen, 1872)
- Lachnocnema divergens Gaede, 1915
- Lachnocnema vuattouxi Libert, 1996
- Lachnocnema dohertyi Libert, 1996

=== Poritiinae ===
==== Liptenini ====
- Alaena amazoula nyasana Hawker-Smith, 1933
- Alaena johanna johanna Sharpe, 1890
- Alaena johanna tsavoa Jackson, 1966
- Alaena ngonga Jackson, 1966
- Alaena picata Sharpe, 1896
- Pentila pauli Staudinger, 1888
- Pentila rogersi (Druce, 1907)
- Pentila tachyroides Dewitz, 1879
- Pentila tropicalis chyulu van Someren, 1939
- Pentila tropicalis mombasae (Grose-Smith & Kirby, 1889)
- Ornipholidotos katangae Stempffer, 1947
- Ornipholidotos amieti angulata Libert, 2005
- Ornipholidotos peucetia peuceda (Grose-Smith, 1889)
- Mimacraea krausei Dewitz, 1889
- Mimacraea marshalli marshalli Trimen, 1898
- Mimacraea marshalli dohertyi Rothschild, 1901
- Mimeresia dinora (Kirby, 1890)
- Liptena kiellandi Congdon & Collins, 1998
- Tetrarhanis ilma (Hewitson, 1873)
- Tetrarhanis stempfferi kigezi (Stempffer, 1956)
- Pseuderesia mapongua (Holland, 1893)
- Eresina crola Talbot, 1935
- Teriomima subpunctata Kirby, 1887
- Teriomima micra (Grose-Smith, 1898)
- Teriomima parva Hawker-Smith, 1933
- Baliochila hildegarda (Kirby, 1887)
- Baliochila dubiosa Stempffer & Bennett, 1953
- Baliochila minima (Hawker-Smith, 1933)
- Baliochila amanica Stempffer & Bennett, 1953
- Baliochila latimarginata (Hawker-Smith, 1933)
- Baliochila lipara Stempffer & Bennett, 1953
- Baliochila confusa Henning & Henning, 2004
- Baliochila fragilis Stempffer & Bennett, 1953
- Baliochila stygia Stempffer & Bennett, 1953
- Cnodontes vansomereni Stempffer & Bennett, 1953
- Eresinopsides bichroma jefferyi Stempffer, 1950

==== Epitolini ====
- Iridana tororo Stempffer, 1964
- Cerautola miranda vidua (Talbot, 1935)
- Cephetola mengoensis (Bethune-Baker, 1906)
- Cephetola orientalis (Roche, 1954)
- Deloneura ochrascens ochrascens (Neave, 1904)
- Deloneura ochrascens littoralis Talbot, 1935
- Neaveia lamborni Druce, 1910
- Hewitsonia inexpectata Bouyer, 1997

=== Aphnaeinae ===
- Lipaphnaeus leonina (Sharpe, 1890)
- Chloroselas azurea Butler, 1900
- Chloroselas esmeralda Butler, 1886
- Chloroselas minima Jackson, 1966
- Chloroselas pseudozeritis pseudozeritis (Trimen, 1873)
- Chloroselas pseudozeritis umbrosa Jackson, 1966
- Chloroselas trembathi Collins & Larsen, 1991
- Chloroselas vansomereni Jackson, 1966
- Vansomerenia rogersi (Riley, 1932)
- Cigaritis apelles (Oberthür, 1878)
- Cigaritis ella (Hewitson, 1865)
- Cigaritis mozambica (Bertoloni, 1850)
- Cigaritis nairobiensis (Sharpe, 1904)
- Cigaritis nilus (Hewitson, 1865)
- Cigaritis somalina (Butler, 1886)
- Cigaritis tavetensis (Lathy, 1906)
- Cigaritis victoriae (Butler, 1884)
- Zeritis neriene Boisduval, 1836
- Axiocerses tjoane (Wallengren, 1857)
- Axiocerses collinsi Henning & Henning, 1996
- Axiocerses punicea (Grose-Smith, 1889)
- Axiocerses jacksoni Stempffer, 1948
- Aloeides conradsi angoniensis Tite & Dickson, 1973
- Aloeides conradsi talboti Tite & Dickson, 1973
- Aphnaeus coronae littoralis Carcasson, 1964
- Aphnaeus hutchinsonii Trimen & Bowker, 1887
- Aphnaeus jacksoni Stempffer, 1954
- Aphnaeus neavei Bethune-Baker, 1926
- Aphnaeus williamsi Carcasson, 1964

=== Theclinae ===
- Myrina dermaptera nyassae Talbot, 1935
- Myrina silenus ficedula Trimen, 1879
- Myrina subornata kacheleba d'Abrera, 1980
- Hypolycaena buxtoni rogersi Bethune-Baker, 1924
- Hypolycaena obscura Stempffer, 1947
- Hypolycaena pachalica Butler, 1888
- Hypolycaena philippus (Fabricius, 1793)
- Hemiolaus caeculus littoralis Stempffer, 1954
- Leptomyrina hirundo (Wallengren, 1857)
- Leptomyrina gorgias cana Talbot, 1935
- Leptomyrina gorgias sobrina Talbot, 1935
- Iolaus bolissus Hewitson, 1873
- Iolaus alienus ugandae Stempffer, 1953
- Iolaus apatosa (Stempffer, 1952)
- Iolaus arborifera (Butler, 1901)
- Iolaus bansana Bethune-Baker, 1926
- Iolaus bellina (Plötz, 1880)
- Iolaus diametra diametra (Karsch, 1895)
- Iolaus diametra littoralis (Congdon & Collins, 1998)
- Iolaus hemicyanus Sharpe, 1904
- Iolaus iasis Hewitson, 1865
- Iolaus jacksoni (Stempffer, 1950)
- Iolaus mermis (Druce, 1896)
- Iolaus mimosae haemus (Talbot, 1935)
- Iolaus mimosae rhodosense (Stempffer & Bennett, 1959)
- Iolaus pollux Aurivillius, 1895
- Iolaus sibella (Druce, 1910)
- Iolaus silanus Grose-Smith, 1889
- Iolaus tajoraca tajoraca Walker, 1870
- Iolaus tajoraca ertli Aurivillius, 1916
- Iolaus umbrosa (Butler, 1886)
- Iolaus pallene (Wallengren, 1857)
- Iolaus menas tatiana (d'Abrera, 1980)
- Iolaus crawshayi crawshayi (Butler, 1901)
- Iolaus crawshayi elgonae (Stempffer & Bennett, 1958)
- Iolaus crawshayi littoralis (Stempffer & Bennett, 1958)
- Iolaus crawshayi maureli Dufrane, 1954
- Iolaus crawshayi nyanzae (Stempffer & Bennett, 1958)
- Iolaus lalos (Druce, 1896)
- Iolaus maritimus (Stempffer & Bennett, 1958)
- Iolaus silarus Druce, 1885
- Iolaus poultoni (Riley, 1928)
- Iolaus catori Bethune-Baker, 1904
- Stugeta bowkeri kedonga van Someren, 1939
- Stugeta bowkeri mombasae Butler, 1901
- Stugeta bowkeri nyanzana Wichgraf, 1911
- Stugeta carpenteri Stempffer, 1946
- Stugeta marmoreus olalae Stoneham, 1934
- Stugeta somalina Stempffer, 1946
- Pilodeudorix obscurata (Trimen, 1891)
- Pilodeudorix camerona (Plötz, 1880)
- Pilodeudorix congoana (Aurivillius, 1923)
- Paradeudorix ituri ugandae (Talbot, 1935)
- Deudorix dariaves Hewitson, 1877
- Deudorix dinochares Grose-Smith, 1887
- Deudorix diocles Hewitson, 1869
- Deudorix ecaudata Gifford, 1963
- Deudorix jacksoni Talbot, 1935
- Deudorix livia (Klug, 1834)
- Deudorix suk Stempffer, 1948
- Deudorix vansomereni Stempffer, 1951
- Capys calpurnia Henning & Henning, 1988
- Capys catharus rileyi Stempffer, 1967
- Capys collinsi Henning & Henning, 1988
- Capys cupreus Henning & Henning, 1988
- Capys hermes Henning & Henning, 1988
- Capys juliae Henning & Henning, 1988
- Capys meruensis Henning & Henning, 1988

=== Lycaeninae ===
- Lycaena phlaeas abbottii (Holland, 1892)

=== Polyommatinae ===
==== Lycaenesthini ====
- Anthene amarah (Guérin-Méneville, 1849)
- Anthene bjoernstadi Collins & Larsen, 1991
- Anthene butleri butleri (Oberthür, 1880)
- Anthene butleri galla Stempffer, 1947
- Anthene butleri stempfferi Storace, 1954
- Anthene contrastata mashuna (Stevenson, 1937)
- Anthene contrastata turkana Stempffer, 1936
- Anthene hobleyi hobleyi (Neave, 1904)
- Anthene hobleyi elgonensis (Aurivillius, 1925)
- Anthene hobleyi teita Stempffer, 1961
- Anthene hodsoni hodsoni (Talbot, 1935)
- Anthene hodsoni usamba (Talbot, 1937)
- Anthene janna Gabriel, 1949
- Anthene kersteni (Gerstaecker, 1871)
- Anthene lasti (Grose-Smith & Kirby, 1894)
- Anthene lemnos loa (Strand, 1911)
- Anthene minima (Trimen, 1893)
- Anthene opalina Stempffer, 1946
- Anthene otacilia dulcis (Pagenstecher, 1902)
- Anthene rothschildi (Aurivillius, 1922)
- Anthene rubricinctus (Holland, 1891)
- Anthene talboti Stempffer, 1936
- Anthene wilsoni (Talbot, 1935)
- Anthene staudingeri obsoleta (Stempffer, 1947)
- Anthene kimboza (Kielland, 1990)
- Anthene lamias (Hewitson, 1878)
- Anthene nigeriae (Aurivillius, 1905)

==== Polyommatini ====
- Cupidopsis jobates (Hopffer, 1855)
- Pseudonacaduba aethiops (Mabille, 1877)
- Uranothauma heritsia (Hewitson, 1876)
- Uranothauma nubifer (Trimen, 1895)
- Uranothauma vansomereni Stempffer, 1951
- Phlyaria cyara (Hewitson, 1876)
- Cacyreus tespis (Herbst, 1804)
- Harpendyreus aequatorialis (Sharpe, 1892)
- Harpendyreus marungensis (Joicey & Talbot, 1924)
- Leptotes adamsoni Collins & Larsen, 1991
- Leptotes babaulti (Stempffer, 1935)
- Leptotes brevidentatus (Tite, 1958)
- Leptotes jeanneli (Stempffer, 1935)
- Leptotes marginalis (Stempffer, 1944)
- Leptotes pulchra (Murray, 1874)
- Tuxentius calice gregorii (Butler, 1894)
- Tuxentius cretosus cretosus (Butler, 1876)
- Tuxentius cretosus usemia (Neave, 1904)
- Tuxentius melaena (Trimen & Bowker, 1887)
- Tarucus grammicus (Grose-Smith & Kirby, 1893)
- Tarucus kulala Evans, 1955
- Tarucus legrasi Stempffer, 1948
- Tarucus rosacea (Austaut, 1885)
- Tarucus theophrastus (Fabricius, 1793)
- Tarucus ungemachi Stempffer, 1942
- Zintha hintza (Trimen, 1864)
- Zizina antanossa (Mabille, 1877)
- Actizera lucida (Trimen, 1883)
- Azanus ubaldus (Stoll, 1782)
- Eicochrysops distractus (de Joannis & Verity, 1913)
- Eicochrysops masai (Bethune-Baker, 1905)
- Eicochrysops messapus (Godart, 1824)
- Eicochrysops rogersi Bethune-Baker, 1924
- Euchrysops albistriata (Capronnier, 1889)
- Euchrysops barkeri (Trimen, 1893)
- Euchrysops brunneus Bethune-Baker, 1923
- Euchrysops horus (Stoneham, 1938)
- Euchrysops kabrosae (Bethune-Baker, 1906)
- Euchrysops malathana (Boisduval, 1833)
- Euchrysops mauensis Bethune-Baker, 1923
- Euchrysops nilotica (Aurivillius, 1904)
- Euchrysops osiris (Hopffer, 1855)
- Euchrysops severini Hulstaert, 1924
- Euchrysops subpallida Bethune-Baker, 1923
- Thermoniphas colorata (Ungemach, 1932)
- Oboronia bueronica Karsch, 1895
- Oboronia guessfeldti (Dewitz, 1879)
- Chilades naidina (Butler, 1886)
- Freyeria trochylus (Freyer, [1843])
- Lepidochrysops kitale (Stempffer, 1936)
- Lepidochrysops desmondi Stempffer, 1951
- Lepidochrysops elgonae elgonae Stempffer, 1950
- Lepidochrysops elgonae moyo van Someren, 1957
- Lepidochrysops jansei van Someren, 1957
- Lepidochrysops kocak Seven, 1997
- Lepidochrysops loveni (Aurivillius, 1922)
- Lepidochrysops lukenia van Someren, 1957
- Lepidochrysops neonegus neonegus (Bethune-Baker, [1923])
- Lepidochrysops neonegus borealis van Someren, 1957
- Lepidochrysops peculiaris peculiaris (Rogenhofer, 1891)
- Lepidochrysops peculiaris hypoleucus (Butler, 1893)
- Lepidochrysops polydialecta (Bethune-Baker, [1923])
- Lepidochrysops pterou pterou (Bethune-Baker, [1923])
- Lepidochrysops pterou suk van Someren, 1957
- Lepidochrysops victoriae vansomereni Stempffer, 1951

== Nymphalidae ==
=== Danainae ===
==== Danaini ====
- Danaus dorippus (Klug, 1845)
- Amauris crawshayi Butler, 1897
- Amauris ellioti altumi van Someren, 1936
- Amauris ellioti ansorgei Sharpe, 1896
- Amauris ochlea ochlea (Boisduval, 1847)
- Amauris ochlea darius Rothschild & Jordan, 1903

=== Satyrinae ===
==== Melanitini ====
- Aphysoneura pigmentaria kiellandi Congdon & Collins, 1998
- Aphysoneura pigmentaria pringlei (Sharpe, 1894)
- Aphysoneura scapulifascia collinsi Kielland, 1989

==== Satyrini ====
- Bicyclus angulosa (Butler, 1868)
- Bicyclus anynana (Butler, 1879)
- Bicyclus auricruda fulgidus Fox, 1963
- Bicyclus campina carcassoni Condamin, 1963
- Bicyclus campina ocelligera (Strand, 1910)
- Bicyclus ena (Hewitson, 1877)
- Bicyclus kenia (Rogenhofer, 1891)
- Bicyclus milyas (Hewitson, 1864)
- Bicyclus pavonis (Butler, 1876)
- Heteropsis phaea (Karsch, 1894)
- Heteropsis teratia (Karsch, 1894)
- Heteropsis peitho (Plötz, 1880)
- Ypthima condamini Kielland, 1982
- Ypthima asterope (Klug, 1832) - common three ring
- Ypthima impura paupera Ungemach, 1932
- Ypthima jacksoni Kielland, 1982
- Ypthima pupillaris Butler, 1888
- Ypthima rhodesiana Carcasson, 1961
- Ypthima yatta Kielland, 1982
- Neocoenyra duplex Butler, 1886
- Neocoenyra fulleborni Thurau, 1903
- Neocoenyra masaica Carcasson, 1958
- Coenyropsis carcassoni Kielland, 1976
- Physcaeneura leda (Gerstaecker, 1871)
- Neita victoriae (Aurivillius, 1899)

=== Charaxinae ===
==== Charaxini ====
- Charaxes varanes (Cramer, 1777)
- Charaxes acuminatus kulalae van Someren, 1975
- Charaxes acuminatus oreas Talbot, 1932
- Charaxes acuminatus shimbanus van Someren, 1963
- Charaxes acuminatus teitensis van Someren, 1963
- Charaxes protoclea azota (Hewitson, 1877)
- Charaxes macclounii Butler, 1895
- Charaxes lasti Grose-Smith, 1889
- Charaxes jasius Poulton, 1926
- Charaxes epijasius Reiche, 1850
- Charaxes jasius harrisoni Sharpe, 1904
- Charaxes jasius saturnus Butler, 1866
- Charaxes hansali baringana Rothschild, 1905
- Charaxes hansali kulalae van Someren, 1975
- Charaxes ansorgei ansorgei Rothschild, 1897
- Charaxes ansorgei jacksoni Poulton, 1933
- Charaxes ansorgei loita Plantrou, 1982
- Charaxes eudoxus amaurus Poulton, 1929
- Charaxes overlaeti Schouteden, 1934
- Charaxes bohemani Felder & Felder, 1859
- Charaxes xiphares desmondi van Someren, 1939
- Charaxes xiphares kulal van Someren, 1962
- Charaxes xiphares walwandi Collins, 1989
- Charaxes nandina Rothschild & Jordan, 1901
- Charaxes cithaeron kennethi Poulton, 1926
- Charaxes cithaeron nairobicus van Son, 1953
- Charaxes violetta maritima van Someren, 1966
- Charaxes violetta meru van Someren, 1966
- Charaxes ameliae victoriae van Someren, 1972
- Charaxes achaemenes achaemenes Felder & Felder, 1867
- Charaxes achaemenes monticola van Someren, 1970
- Charaxes jahlusa ganalensis Carpenter, 1937
- Charaxes jahlusa kenyensis Joicey & Talbot, 1925
- Charaxes dilutus ngonga van Someren, 1974
- Charaxes baumanni baumanni Rogenhofer, 1891
- Charaxes baumanni bamptoni van Someren, 1974
- Charaxes baumanni nyiro Collins & Larsen, 1991
- Charaxes baumanni tenuis van Someren, 1971
- Charaxes blanda kenyae Poulton, 1926
- Charaxes ethalion littoralis van Someren, 1967
- Charaxes ethalion marsabitensis van Someren, 1967
- Charaxes ethalion nyanzae van Someren, 1967
- Charaxes viola Butler, 1866
- Charaxes chanleri Holland, 1896
- Charaxes kirki Butler, 1881
- Charaxes aubyni aubyni van Someren & Jackson, 1952
- Charaxes aubyni ecketti van Someren & Jackson, 1957
- Charaxes contrarius van Someren, 1969
- Charaxes guderiana rabaiensis Poulton, 1929
- Charaxes paphianus Ward, 1871
- Charaxes zoolina (Westwood, [1850])

==== Euxanthini ====
- Charaxes eurinome (Cramer, 1775)
- Charaxes wakefieldi (Ward, 1873)
- Charaxes tiberius tiberius (Grose-Smith, 1889)
- Charaxes tiberius meruensis (van Someren, 1936)

=== Nymphalinae ===
- Vanessula milca (Hewitson, 1873)

==== Nymphalini ====
- Antanartia schaeneia (Trimen, 1879)
- Vanessa dimorphica (Howarth, 1966)
- Vanessa abyssinica jacksoni Howarth, 1966
- Junonia artaxia Hewitson, 1864
- Junonia natalica (Felder & Felder, 1860)
- Junonia ansorgei (Rothschild, 1899)
- Salamis cacta cacta (Fabricius, 1793)
- Salamis cacta amaniensis Vosseler, 1907
- Protogoniomorpha anacardii nebulosa (Trimen, 1881)
- Precis actia Distant, 1880
- Precis archesia (Cramer, 1779)
- Precis limnoria taveta Rogenhofer, 1891
- Precis sinuata hecqui Berger, 1981
- Hypolimnas deceptor (Trimen, 1873)
- Hypolimnas monteironis (Druce, 1874)
- Hypolimnas salmacis (Drury, 1773)
- Hypolimnas usambara (Ward, 1872)

=== Biblidinae ===
==== Biblidini ====
- Byblia anvatara acheloia (Wallengren, 1857)
- Neptidopsis fulgurata platyptera Rothschild & Jordan, 1903
- Eurytela dryope (Cramer, [1775])
- Eurytela hiarbas (Drury, 1782)

==== Epicaliini ====
- Sevenia morantii (Trimen, 1881)
- Sevenia natalensis (Boisduval, 1847)
- Sevenia rosa (Hewitson, 1877)

=== Limenitinae ===
==== Limenitidini ====
- Harma theobene blassi (Weymer, 1892)
- Harma theobene superna (Fox, 1968)
- Cymothoe coranus Grose-Smith, 1889
- Cymothoe teita van Someren, 1939
- Pseudacraea deludens echerioides Talbot, 1941

==== Neptidini ====
- Neptis agouale Pierre-Baltus, 1978
- Neptis aurivillii Schultze, 1913
- Neptis gratiosa Overlaet, 1955
- Neptis jordani Neave, 1910
- Neptis katama Collins & Larsen, 1991
- Neptis kikuyuensis Jackson, 1951
- Neptis kiriakoffi Overlaet, 1955
- Neptis lugubris Rebel, 1914
- Neptis nemetes Hewitson, 1868
- Neptis quintilla Mabille, 1890
- Neptis nicoteles Hewitson, 1874
- Neptis nina Staudinger, 1896
- Neptis occidentalis Rothschild, 1918
- Neptis rogersi Eltringham, 1921

==== Adoliadini ====
- Euryphura achlys (Hopffer, 1855)
- Euryphura isuka Stoneham, 1935
- Bebearia cocalia badiana (Rbel, 1914)
- Bebearia orientis orientis (Karsch, 1895)
- Bebearia orientis dealbata (Carcasson, 1958)
- Bebearia orientis taveta Clifton, 1980
- Bebearia sophus (Fabricius, 1793)
- Bebearia chriemhilda (Staudinger, 1896)
- Euphaedra zaddachii crawshayi Butler, 1895
- Euphaedra viridicaerulea nitidula van Someren, 1935
- Euphaedra paradoxa Neave, 1904
- Euphaedra rattrayi Sharpe, 1904
- Euphaedra orientalis Rothschild, 1898
- Euphaedra neophron littoralis Talbot, 1929
- Euphaedra neophron ellenbecki Pagenstrecher, 1902
- Euphaedra neophron meruensis van Someren, 1935
- Euptera kinugnana (Grose-Smith, 1889)
- Pseudathyma lucretioides Carpenter & Jackson, 1950
- Pseudathyma nzoia van Someren, 1939

=== Heliconiinae ===
==== Acraeini ====
- Acraea acara Hewitson, 1865
- Acraea anemosa Hewitson, 1865
- Acraea boopis ama Pierre, 1979
- Acraea chilo Godman, 1880
- Acraea cuva Grose-Smith, 1889
- Acraea endoscota Le Doux, 1928
- Acraea magnifica Carpenter & Jackson, 1950
- Acraea matuapa Grose-Smith, 1889
- Acraea neobule Doubleday, 1847
- Acraea pseudolycia astrigera Butler, 1899
- Acraea rabbaiae Ward, 1873
- Acraea satis Ward, 1871
- Acraea zetes (Linnaeus, 1758)
- Acraea rudolfi Eltringham, 1929
- Acraea zonata Hewitson, 1877
- Acraea acrita Hewitson, 1865
- Acraea petraea Boisduval, 1847
- Acraea pudorina Staudinger, 1885
- Acraea braesia Godman, 1885
- Acraea caecilia caecilia (Fabricius, 1781)
- Acraea caecilia kulal van Someren, 1936
- Acraea caecilia pudora Aurivillius, 1910
- Acraea caldarena caldarena Hewitson, 1877
- Acraea caldarena neluska Oberthür, 1878
- Acraea equatorialis equatorialis Neave, 1904
- Acraea equatorialis anaemia Eltringham, 1912
- Acraea lygus Druce, 1875
- Acraea mirabilis Butler, 1886
- Acraea miranda Riley, 1920
- Acraea natalica Boisduval, 1847
- Acraea pudorella Aurivillius, 1899
- Acraea sykesi Sharpe, 1902 xx
- Acraea adrasta Weymer, 1892
- Acraea aganice montana (Butler, 1888)
- Acraea aganice ugandae (van Someren, 1936)
- Acraea epaea epitellus Staudinger, 1896
- Acraea epaea paragea (Grose-Smith, 1900)
- Acraea umbra hemileuca (Jordan, 1914)
- Acraea althoffi neavei Poulton, 1924
- Acraea ansorgei Grose-Smith, 1898
- Acraea baxteri philos Le Cerf, 1933
- Acraea bonasia (Fabricius, 1775)
- Acraea cabira Hopffer, 1855
- Acraea esebria Hewitson, 1861
- Acraea excelsior Sharpe, 1891
- Acraea pentapolis Ward, 1871
- Acraea rangatana rangatana Eltringham, 1912
- Acraea rangatana ecketti Jackson, 1951
- Acraea viviana Staudinger, 1896
- Acraea anacreontica chyulu van Someren, 1939
- Acraea bomba Grose-Smith, 1889
- Acraea wigginsi Neave, 1904
- Acraea aubyni Eltringham, 1912
- Acraea parrhasia kenya van Someren & Rogers, 1926
- Acraea parrhasia orientis Aurivillius, 1904

==== Argynnini ====
- Issoria hanningtoni jeanneli (Bernardi, 1968)

==== Vagrantini ====
- Lachnoptera ayresii Trimen, 1879
- Phalanta phalantha aethiopica (Rothschild & Jordan, 1903)

== Hesperiidae ==
=== Coeliadinae ===
- Coeliades anchises (Gerstaecker, 1871)
- Coeliades hanno (Plötz, 1879)
- Coeliades keithloa kenya Evans, 1937
- Coeliades keithloa merua Evans, 1947
- Coeliades pisistratus (Fabricius, 1793)
- Coeliades sejuncta (Mabille & Vuillot, 1891)

=== Pyrginae ===
==== Celaenorrhinini ====
- Celaenorrhinus handmani Collins & Congdon, 1998
- Celaenorrhinus lourentis de Jong, 1976
- Eretis umbra (Trimen, 1862)
- Sarangesa phidyle (Walker, 1870)
- Sarangesa princei Karsch, 1896
- Sarangesa thecla mabira Evans, 1956

==== Tagiadini ====
- Eagris decastigma Mabille, 1891
- Caprona adelica Karsch, 1892
- Leucochitonea hindei Druce, 1903
- Abantis meru Evans, 1947
- Abantis paradisea (Butler, 1870)
- Abantis tettensis Hopffer, 1855
- Abantis venosa Trimen & Bowker, 1889

==== Carcharodini ====
- Spialia colotes semiconfluens de Jong, 1978
- Spialia colotes transvaaliae (Trimen & Bowker, 1889)
- Spialia confusa obscura Evans, 1937
- Spialia delagoae (Trimen, 1898)
- Spialia depauperata (Strand, 1911)
- Spialia doris (Walker, 1870)
- Spialia kituina (Karsch, 1896)
- Spialia mafa higginsi Evans, 1937
- Spialia mangana (Rebel, 1899)
- Spialia wrefordi Evans, 1951
- Gomalia elma (Trimen, 1862)

=== Hesperiinae ===
==== Aeromachini ====
- Astictopterus stellata (Mabille, 1891)
- Prosopalpus saga Evans, 1937
- Ampittia capenas (Hewitson, 1868)
- Kedestes brunneostriga (Plötz, 1884)
- Kedestes callicles (Hewitson, 1868)
- Kedestes nancy Collins & Larsen, 1991
- Kedestes nerva paola Plötz, 1884
- Kedestes rogersi Druce, 1907
- Kedestes wallengrenii (Trimen, 1883)
- Gorgyra diva Evans, 1937
- Gorgyra johnstoni (Butler, 1894)
- Gorgyra minima Holland, 1896
- Gorgyra subflavidus Holland, 1896
- Teniorhinus herilus (Hopffer, 1855)
- Ceratrichia semlikensis Joicey & Talbot, 1921
- Acada biseriata (Mabille, 1893)
- Osmodes thora (Plötz, 1884)
- Parosmodes morantii (Trimen, 1873)
- Semalea arela (Mabille, 1891)
- Andronymus neander (Plötz, 1884)
- Chondrolepis telisignata (Butler, 1896)
- Zophopetes nobilior (Holland, 1896)
- Artitropa erinnys ehlersi Karsch, 1896
- Artitropa erinnys radiata Riley, 1925
- Artitropa erinnys vansomereni Riley, 1925
- Artitropa reducta Aurivillius, 1925
- Gretna carmen carmen Evans, 1937
- Gretna carmen capra Evans, 1937
- Leona halma Evans, 1937
- Monza cretacea (Snellen, 1872)
- Platylesches moritili (Wallengren, 1857)
- Platylesches tina Evans, 1937

==== Baorini ====
- Borbo fanta (Evans, 1937)
- Borbo ferruginea (Aurivillius, 1925)

=== Heteropterinae ===
- Metisella abdeli abdeli (Krüger, 1928)
- Metisella abdeli elgona Evans, 1938
- Metisella formosus (Butler, 1894)
- Metisella quadrisignatus quadrisignatus (Butler, 1894)
- Metisella quadrisignatus nanda Evans, 1937
- Metisella willemi (Wallengren, 1857)
- Metisella midas (Butler, 1894)

== See also ==
- Geography of Kenya
- List of ecoregions in Kenya
- Kakamega Forest
