= Anthene hodsoni =

Hodson's hairtail

Scientific classification
- Domain: Eukaryota
- Kingdom: Animalia
- Phylum: Arthropoda
- Class: Insecta
- Order: Lepidoptera
- Family: Lycaenidae
- Genus: Anthene
- Species: A. hodsoni

Binomial name
- Anthene hodsoni (Talbot, 1935)

Synonyms
- Lycaenesthes hodsoni Talbot, 1935; Anthene (Anthene) hodsoni; Lycaenesthes hodsoni usamba Talbot, 1937

Species of butterfly

Anthene hodsoni, the Hodson's hairtail, is a butterfly in the family Lycaenidae. It is found in Ethiopia, Sudan, Uganda and Kenya. The habitat consists of savanna.

The larvae feed on Acacia drepanolobium from within galls. The larvae are associated with ants of the genus Pheidole.

== Subspecies ==
- Anthene hodsoni hodsoni (south-western Ethiopia, Sudan, Uganda, north-western Kenya)
- Anthene hodsoni usamba (Talbot, 1937) (central Kenya)
