= Lepidochrysops elgonae =

Scientific classification
- Kingdom: Animalia
- Phylum: Arthropoda
- Class: Insecta
- Order: Lepidoptera
- Family: Lycaenidae
- Genus: Lepidochrysops
- Species: L. elgonae

Binomial name
- Lepidochrysops elgonae Stempffer, 1950

Synonyms
- Lepidochrysops neonegus elgonae Stempffer, 1950

Species of butterfly

Lepidochrysops elgonae, the Elgon blue, is a butterfly in the family Lycaenidae. It is found in Kenya. The habitat consists of areas with short grass.

Adults have been recorded in April, June and July.

The larvae feed on Salvia species. They are thought to be associated with harvester ants of the genus Messor.

== Subspecies ==
- Lepidochrysops elgonae elgonae (Kenya: west of the Rift Valley, from south and east of Elgon through the Trans Nzoia to Eldoret and the Mau)
- Lepidochrysops elgonae moyo van Someren, 1957 (Kenya: east of the Rift Valley)
