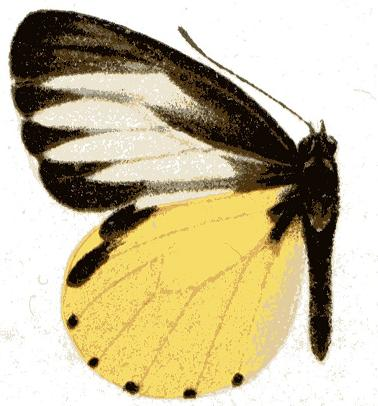
- M. s. dentatus

Scientific classification
- Kingdom: Animalia
- Phylum: Arthropoda
- Clade: Pancrustacea
- Class: Insecta
- Order: Lepidoptera
- Family: Pieridae
- Genus: Mylothris
- Species: M. sagala

Binomial name
- Mylothris sagala Grose-Smith, 1886

Synonyms
- Mylothris narcissus var. dentatus Butler, 1896; Mylothris narcissus var. dulcis Thurau, 1903; Mylothris narcissus ab. decora Thurau, 1903; Mylothris narcissus ab. aequimargo Thurau, 1903; Mylothris narcissus Butler, 1888; Mylothris neumanni Sharpe, 1896; Mylothris sagala sagala f. seminigra Talbot, 1944; Mylothris swaynei Butler, 1899; Mylothris sagala f. umtaliana van Son, 1949

= Mylothris sagala =

Species of butterfly

Mylothris sagala, the dusky dotted border or lemon dotted border, is a butterfly in the family Pieridae. It is found in Ethiopia, Kenya, Tanzania, the Democratic Republic of the Congo, Rwanda, Malawi, Zambia and Zimbabwe. The habitat consists of submontane and montane forests.

Adults have a weak flight. They feed on the nectar of various flowers. Adults have been recorded on wing in August, September, December and from February to May.

The larvae feed on Loranthus freisiorum, Erianthemum dregei, Oncocalyx fischeri, Oncocalyx sulfureus, Phragmanthera usuiensis, Englerina, Agelanthus and Viscum species.

== Subspecies ==
- M. s. sagala (Tanzania)
- M. s. albissima Talbot, 1944 (south-western Tanzania, northern Zambia, Democratic Republic of the Congo: Shaba, Lomami)
- M. s. dentatus Butler, 1896 (Malawi, north-eastern Zambia, Tanzania: Udzungwa Mountains)
- M. s. mahale Kielland, 1990 (Tanzania)
- M. s. mayenceae Berger, 1987 (Rwanda)
- M. s. narcissus Butler, 1888 (south-eastern Kenya, Tanzania: Mount Kilimanjaro)
- M. s. neumanni Sharpe, 1896 (central highlands of Kenya)
- M. s. oldeanensis Kielland, 1990 (north-eastern Tanzania)
- M. s. seminigra d’Abrera, 1980 (Tanzania: Uluguru Mountains)
- M. s. swaynei Butler, 1899 (highlands of Ethiopia)
- M. s. umtaliana d’Abrera, 1980 (eastern border of Zimbabwe, western border of Mozambique)
