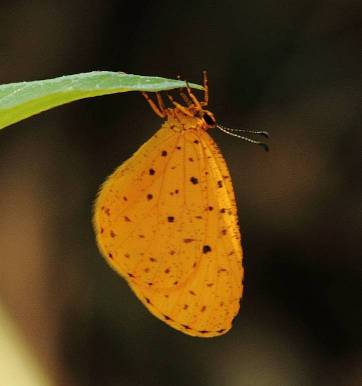
- Pentila tropicalis tropicalis
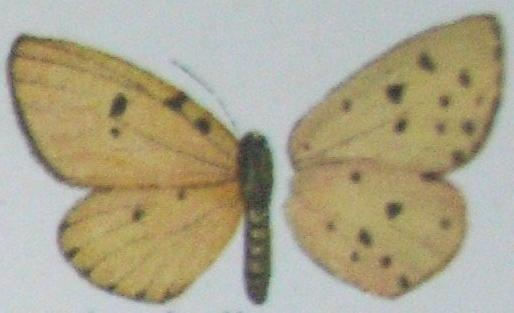

Scientific classification
- Domain: Eukaryota
- Kingdom: Animalia
- Phylum: Arthropoda
- Class: Insecta
- Order: Lepidoptera
- Family: Lycaenidae
- Genus: Pentila
- Species: P. tropicalis

Binomial name
- Pentila tropicalis (Boisduval, 1847)

Synonyms
- Tingra tropicalis Boisduval, 1847; Tingra lasti Grose-Smith & Kirby, 1889; Pentila lasti (dry-season form); Pentila amenaida chyulu van Someren, 1939; Tingra mombasae Grose-Smith & Kirby, 1889; Pentila mombassae ab. sigiensis Strand, 1910

= Pentila tropicalis =

Species of butterfly

Pentila tropicalis, the tropical pentila or spotted buff, is a butterfly of the family Lycaenidae. It is found in eastern Africa.

The wingspan is 29–38 mm for males and 34–44 mm for females. Subspecies P. t. tropicalis has two generations per year, with adults on wing in October and November and from January to April. Subspecies P. t. fuscipunctata has continuous broods from November to April.

The larvae feed on species of cyanobacteria.

== Subspecies ==
- P. t. tropicalis (KwaZulu-Natal, Zululand, Mozambique, Zimbabwe, Zambia, Malawi)
- P. t. chyulu van Someren, 1939 (south-eastern Kenya (Chyulu Hills))
- P. t. fuscipunctata Henning & Henning, 1994 (sheltered riverine lowland forest of the eastern Limpopo province and further north)
- P. t. mombasae (Grose-Smith & Kirby, 1889) (coastal forests of eastern Kenya and eastern Tanzania)
