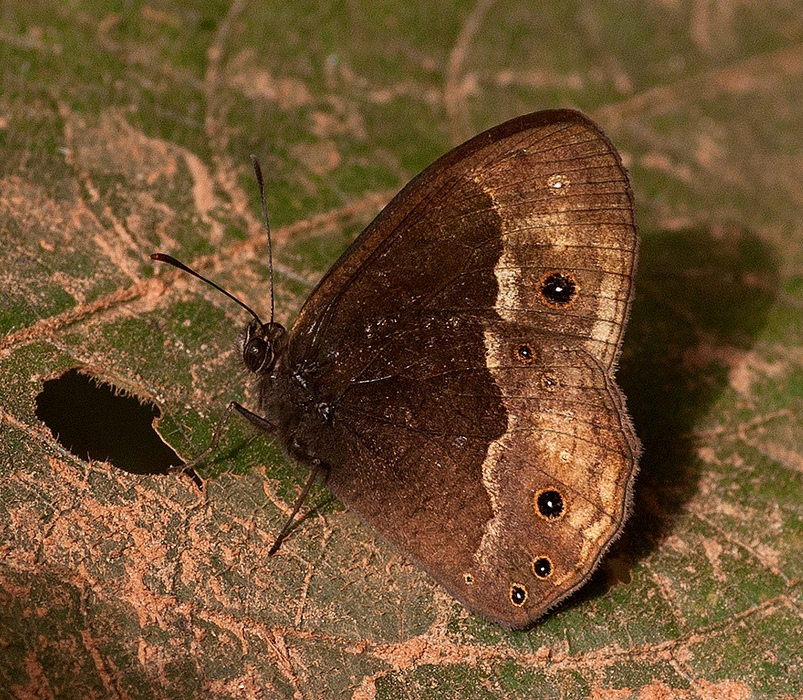
- B. c. campina in Chirinda Forest

Scientific classification
- Kingdom: Animalia
- Phylum: Arthropoda
- Clade: Pancrustacea
- Class: Insecta
- Order: Lepidoptera
- Family: Nymphalidae
- Genus: Bicyclus
- Species: B. campina

Binomial name
- Bicyclus campina (Aurivillius, 1901)

Synonyms
- Mycalesis campina Aurivillius, 1901; Mycalesis campina var. goetzi Thurau, 1903; Mycalesis fuelleborni Bartel, 1905; Mycalesis fuelleborni f. ocelligera Strand, 1910; Mycalesis campina var. subapicalis Aurivillius, 1910

= Bicyclus campina =

Chirinda bush brown

Species of butterfly

Bicyclus campina, the Chirinda bush brown, is a butterfly in the family Nymphalidae. It is found in Semuliki National Park, western Uganda, Kenya, Tanzania, the Democratic Republic of the Congo, Zambia, Malawi, Mozambique and Zimbabwe. The habitat consists of dense savanna and open forests.

Adults are on wing year round. There are well-defined seasonal forms.

The larvae feed on Poaceae species.

== Subspecies ==
- Bicyclus campina campina (Uganda, Tanzania, Democratic Republic of the Congo, Zambia, Malawi, Mozambique, eastern Zimbabwe)
- Bicyclus campina carcassoni Condamin, 1963 (central Kenya)
- Bicyclus campina ocelligera (Strand, 1910) (coast of Kenya, the coast and north-eastern of highlands Tanzania)
