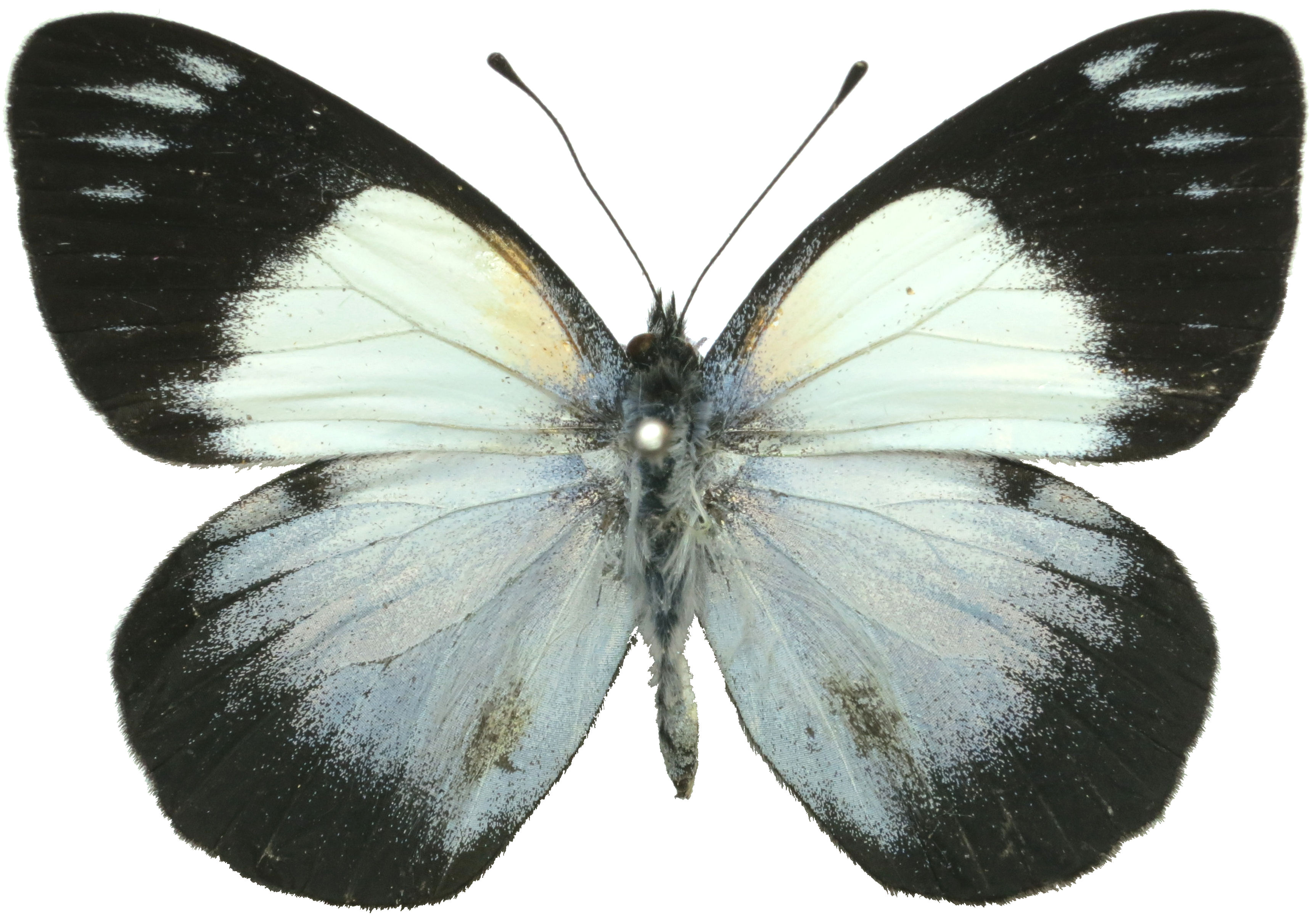
- Belenois margaritacea kenyensis - Coast Province, Kenya

Scientific classification
- Kingdom: Animalia
- Phylum: Arthropoda
- Class: Insecta
- Order: Lepidoptera
- Family: Pieridae
- Genus: Belenois
- Species: B. margaritacea

Binomial name
- Belenois margaritacea Sharpe, 1891

Synonyms
- Pieris margaritacea somereni Talbot, 1928; Pieris margaritacea kenyensis Joicey & Talbot, 1927; Pieris margaritacea plutonica Joicey & Talbot, 1927

= Belenois margaritacea =

Margarita's caper white

Species of butterfly

Belenois margaritacea, the Margarita's caper white, is a butterfly in the family Pieridae. It is found in Kenya and Tanzania. The habitat consists of montane forests.

The larvae feed on Maerua, Capparis and Ritchiea species.

== Subspecies ==
- B. m. margaritacea (south-western Kenya)
- B. m. intermedia Kielland, 1982 (eastern Tanzania)
- B. m. kenyensis (Joicey & Talbot, 1927) (south-eastern Kenya)
- B. m. plutonica (Joicey & Talbot, 1927) (Tanzania)
- B. m. somereni (Talbot, 1928) (central Kenya)
