= Deloneura ochrascens =

Scientific classification
- Kingdom: Animalia
- Phylum: Arthropoda
- Class: Insecta
- Order: Lepidoptera
- Family: Lycaenidae
- Genus: Deloneura
- Species: D. ochrascens

Binomial name
- Deloneura ochrascens (Neave, 1904)

Synonyms
- Poultonia ochrascens Neave, 1904

Species of butterfly

Deloneura ochrascens is a butterfly in the family Lycaenidae. It is found in Uganda, Kenya, Tanzania and Malawi. Its habitat consists of woodland and savannah at altitudes ranging from 900 to 1,700 metres.

The larvae have been found on the bark of Acacia stenocarpa and are associated with the ant species Crematogaster castanea var. tricolor. The larvae are thought to feed on the bark of their host plant or fungus or lichen growing on the bark.

== Subspecies ==
- Deloneura ochrascens ochrascens (Uganda, western Kenya)
- Deloneura ochrascens littoralis Talbot, 1935 (eastern Kenya, Tanzania, Malawi: south to Mlanje)
