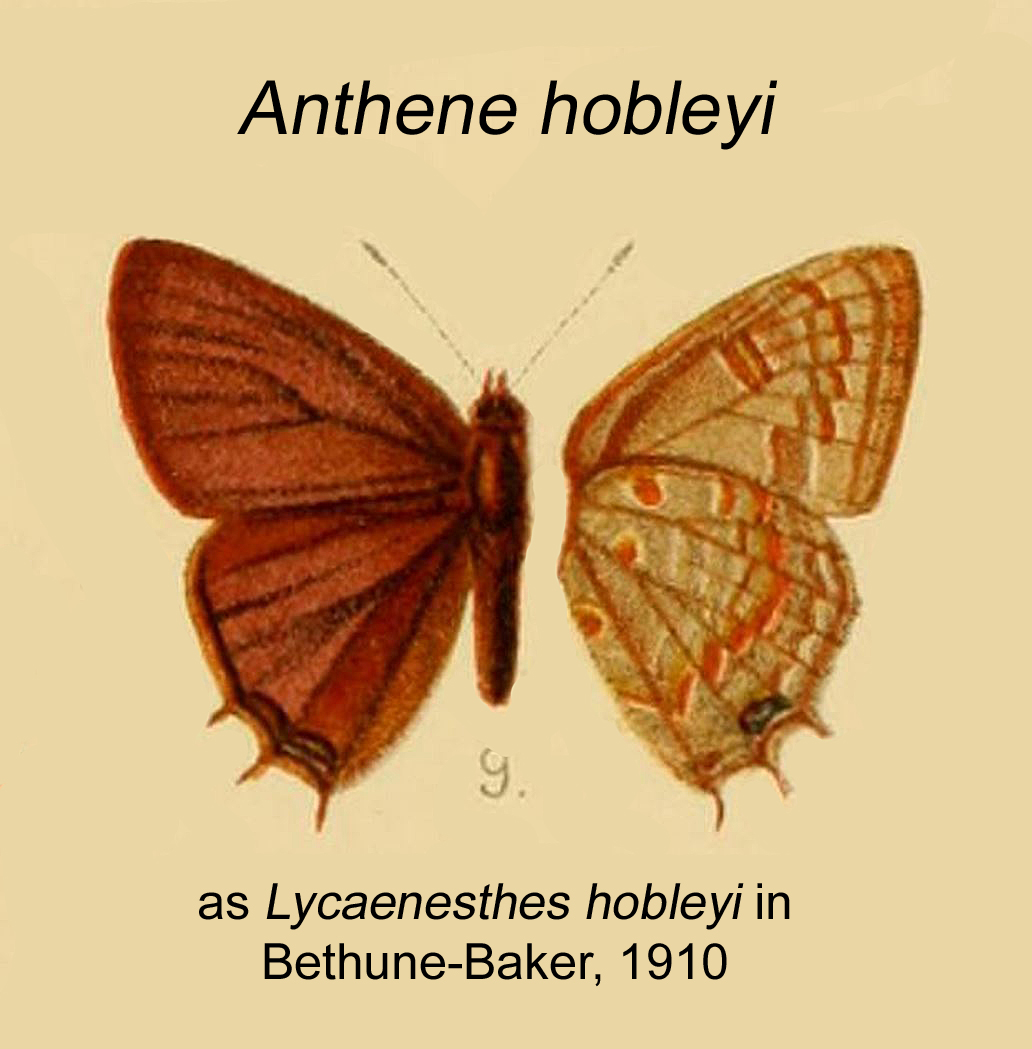

Scientific classification
- Domain: Eukaryota
- Kingdom: Animalia
- Phylum: Arthropoda
- Class: Insecta
- Order: Lepidoptera
- Family: Lycaenidae
- Genus: Anthene
- Species: A. hobleyi

Binomial name
- Anthene hobleyi (Neave, 1904)

Synonyms
- Lycaenesthes hobleyi Neave, 1904; Anthene (Anthene) hobleyi; Lycaenesthes pauperula var. elgonensis Aurivillius, 1925

= Anthene hobleyi =

Hobley's hairtail

Species of butterfly

Anthene hobleyi, the Hobley's hairtail, is a butterfly in the family Lycaenidae. It is found in the Democratic Republic of the Congo, Uganda, Kenya, Tanzania, north-eastern Zambia and possibly Rwanda and Burundi. The habitat consists of semi-montane and montane forests.

== Subspecies ==
- A. h. hobleyi (central Kenya)
- A. h. elgonensis (Aurivillius, 1925) (eastern Uganda, western Kenya)
- A. h. kigezi Stempffer, 1961 (Democratic Republic of the Congo: north-east to North Kivu and possibly Shaba, Uganda (south-east), possibly Rwanda and Burundi)
- A. h. teita Stempffer, 1961 (Kenya: south-east to the Teita Hills)
- A. h. ufipa Kielland, 1990 (Tanzania: Ufipa, Usambara and Kigoma regions)
