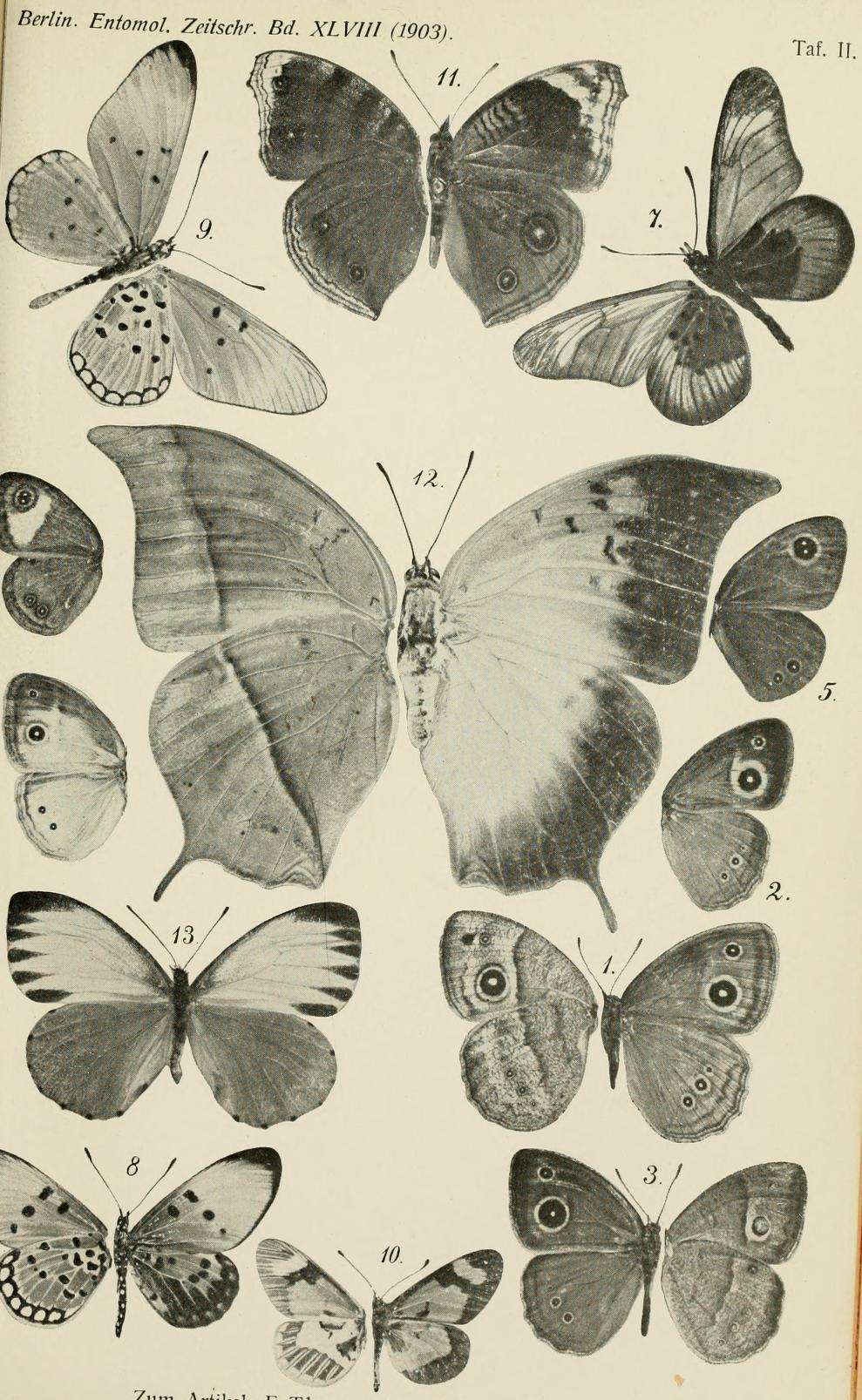
- Figure 7

Scientific classification
- Kingdom: Animalia
- Phylum: Arthropoda
- Class: Insecta
- Order: Lepidoptera
- Family: Nymphalidae
- Genus: Acraea
- Species: A. baxteri

Binomial name
- Acraea baxteri Sharpe, 1902

Synonyms
- Acraea (Actinote) baxteri; Acraea fuelleborni Thurau, 1903; Acraea baxteri subsquamia f. lutea Carpenter and Jackson, 1950; Acraea fuelleborni var. subsquamia Thurau, 1903

= Acraea baxteri =

Species of butterfly

Acraea baxteri is a butterfly in the family Nymphalidae. It is found in Uganda, Kenya, Tanzania, Malawi and Zambia.

== Description ==
A. baxteri E. Sharpe (54 a). Forewing entirely without black dots, in the basal part yellow-red to reddish as far as the apex of the cell and the middle of cellule 2, in the apical part blackish with three whitish, semitransparent spots in 4 to 6. The discal dots of the hindwing are all present, almost touch one another and stand in a curved row, which runs close to the apex of the cell; hindwing above black as far as the discal dots. Distal half yellow-red with narrow, unspotted, black marginal band; beneath in the basal part as far as the discal dots coffee-brown with distinct black dots, then reddish white and at the distal margin with rust-brown marginal band 3 mm. in breadth and black fringes. . Nyassaland, German and British East Africa. - ab.fuelleborni Thur. has the light subapical spots of the fore wing larger and the marginal band on the upperside of the hindwing about 2 mm. in breadth. Nyassaland. In ab. subsquamia Thur. the wings are more densely scaled and the red colour on the upperside of the hindwing extends nearly to the base of cellules 4 to 6. Usambara.

== Subspecies ==
- Acraea baxteri baxteri (southern Tanzania, northern Malawi, Zambia)
- Acraea baxteri oldeani Kielland, 1990 (northern Tanzania)
- Acraea baxteri philos Le Cerf, 1933 (north-eastern Uganda, Kenya)
- Acraea baxteri subsquamia Thurau, 1903 (north-eastern Tanzania)

== Biology ==
The habitat consists of montane forests.

The larvae feed on Urera species.

== Taxonomy ==
It is a member of the Acraea jodutta species group - but see also Pierre & Bernaud, 2014
