= Spialia kituina =

Scientific classification
- Domain: Eukaryota
- Kingdom: Animalia
- Phylum: Arthropoda
- Class: Insecta
- Order: Lepidoptera
- Family: Hesperiidae
- Genus: Spialia
- Species: S. kituina

Binomial name
- Spialia kituina (Karsch, 1896)

Synonyms
- Hesperia kituina Karsch, 1896; Pyrgus bettoni Butler, 1898

Species of butterfly

Spialia kituina, the Kitui grizzled skipper, is a butterfly in the family Hesperiidae. It is found in north-western, central and eastern Kenya.

The larvae feed on Sida species.
