= Lepidochrysops pterou =

Scientific classification
- Kingdom: Animalia
- Phylum: Arthropoda
- Class: Insecta
- Order: Lepidoptera
- Family: Lycaenidae
- Genus: Lepidochrysops
- Species: L. pterou

Binomial name
- Lepidochrysops pterou (Bethune-Baker, [1923])

Synonyms
- Neochrysops pterou Bethune-Baker, [1923]; Euchrysops pteron lilacina Ungemach, 1932

Species of butterfly

Lepidochrysops pterou is a butterfly in the family Lycaenidae. It is found in Ethiopia, Uganda and Kenya. The habitat consists of rocky hillsides and the tops of low rocky outcrops with sparse grass and lamiates and stunted vegetation. Subspecies suk is found on rocky hills and in sparse grass-lamiate areas in savanna under thorn trees and Combretum species.

Adults feed from flowers. They have been recorded on wing in January, March, September and October.

The larvae feed on the flowers of Lamiaceae species

== Subspecies ==
- Lepidochrysops pterou pterou (Uganda: West Nile Province and the south-east, south-western Kenya)
- Lepidochrysops pterou lilacina (Ungemach, 1932) (Ethiopia: valley of the Didessa River)
- Lepidochrysops pterou suk van Someren, 1957 (Kenya: Suk-Karamoja country, the border between Kenya and Uganda and north of Mount Elgon)
