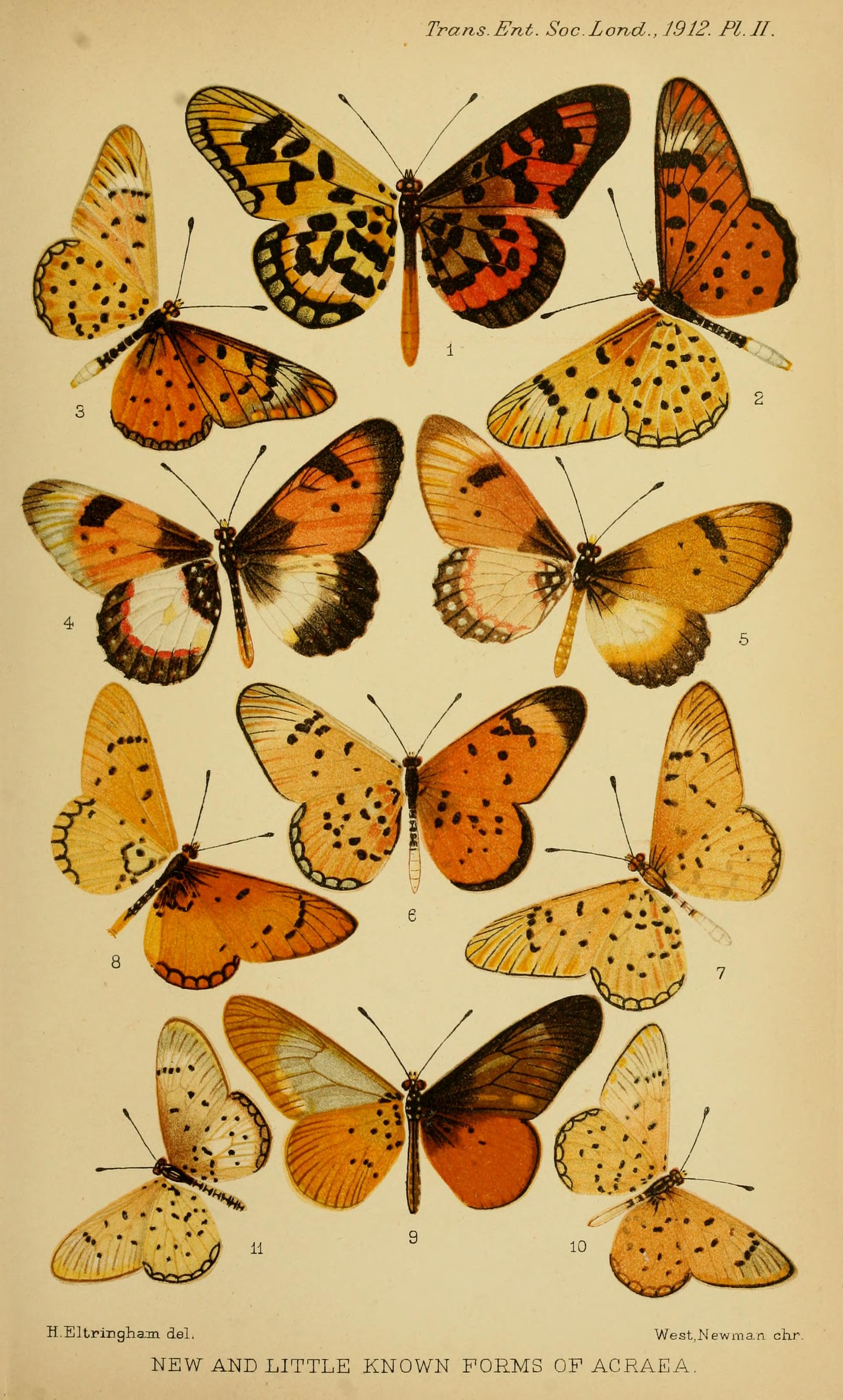
- Figures 10 and 11

Scientific classification
- Kingdom: Animalia
- Phylum: Arthropoda
- Class: Insecta
- Order: Lepidoptera
- Family: Nymphalidae
- Genus: Acraea
- Species: A. equatorialis

Binomial name
- Acraea equatorialis Neave, 1904

Synonyms
- Acraea (Acraea) equatorialis

= Acraea equatorialis =

Species of butterfly

Acraea equatorialis is a butterfly in the family Nymphalidae. It is found in Uganda, Kenya and Tanzania.

== Description ==
A. aequatorialis [sic] Neave (60 g) has the forewing thinly scaled and only bordered by a fine black line at the apex and distal margin; marginal band of the hindwing above in the male very narrowly light-spotted or incomplete, in the female more sharply defined and more indistinctly spotted; the base of the hind wing above narrowly tinged with blackish; the black dots are arranged as in the other species; wings above light (reddish) yellow; the forewing at the distal margin with finely black veins and fine streaks on the folds, occasionally with submarginal dot in 2 or in lb. British East Africa: Kisumu. - anaemia Eltr. only differs in the lighter and more thinly scaled wings. Kilimandjaro and British East Africa.

== Subspecies ==
- Acraea equatorialis equatorialis (eastern Uganda, western Kenya, north-western Tanzania)
- Acraea equatorialis anaemia Eltringham, 1912 (eastern Kenya, north-eastern Tanzania)

== Biology ==
The larvae feed on Passiflora species and Malva verticillata.

== Taxonomy ==
It is a member of the Acraea caecilia species group. See also Pierre & Bernaud, 2014.
