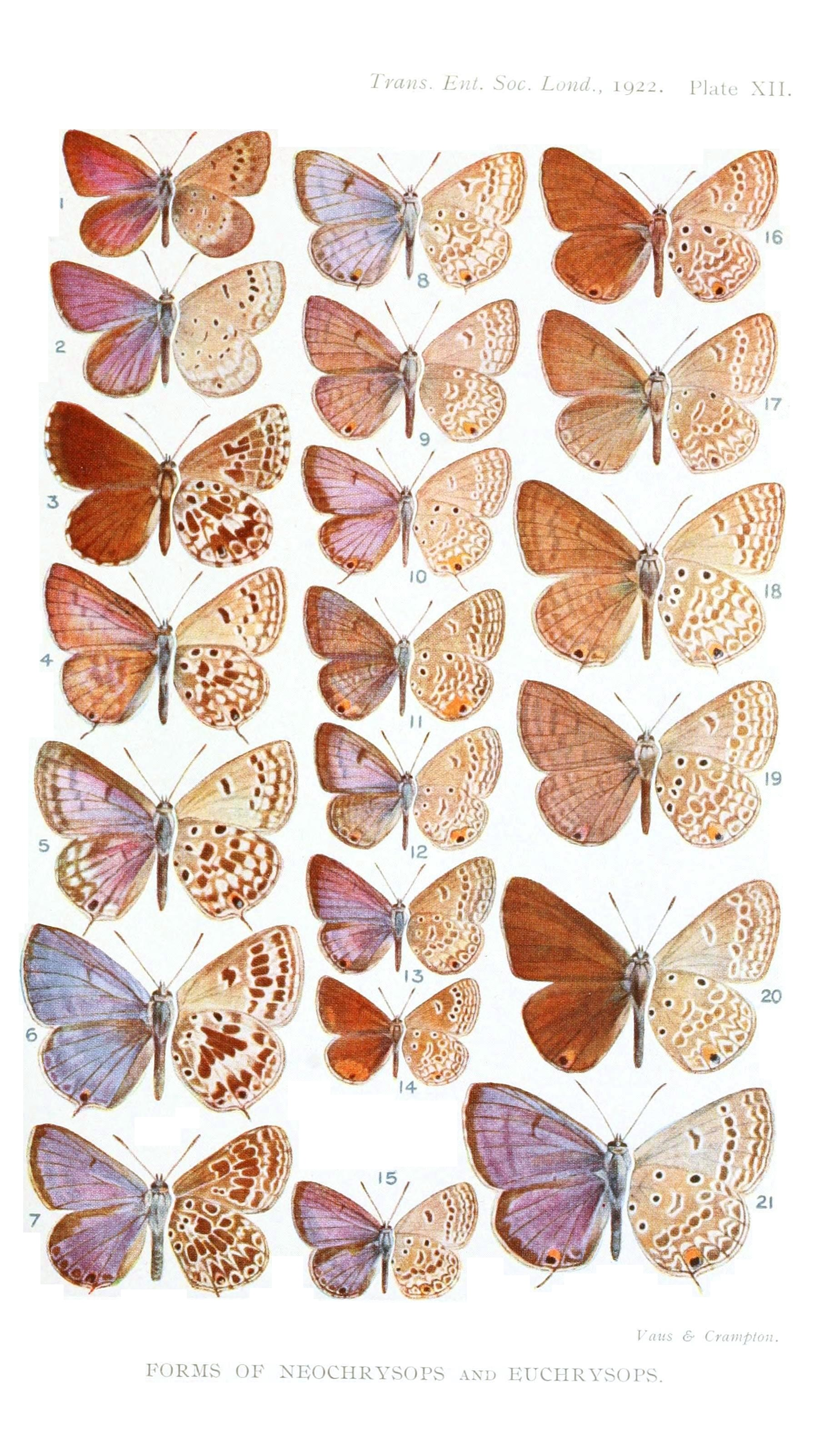
- Figure 8

Scientific classification
- Kingdom: Animalia
- Phylum: Arthropoda
- Class: Insecta
- Order: Lepidoptera
- Family: Lycaenidae
- Genus: Lepidochrysops
- Species: L. neonegus

Binomial name
- Lepidochrysops neonegus (Bethune-Baker, [1923])

Synonyms
- Neochrysops neonegus Bethune-Baker, [1923]; Neochrysops variegata Bethune-Baker, 1923

= Lepidochrysops neonegus =

Species of butterfly

Lepidochrysops neonegus is a butterfly in the family Lycaenidae. It is found in Uganda, Kenya and Tanzania. The habitat consists of areas with short grass in thornbush-Combretum savanna, Acacia savanna and open habitats at altitudes between 900 and 1,800 meters.

Adults feed from the flowers of the family Lamiaceae. They have been recorded in February, May and June. The species is thought to be seasonal.

The larvae feed on Lamiaceae species. They are associated with harvester-ants of the genus Messor.

== Subspecies ==
- Lepidochrysops neonegus neonegus (Kenya: south-central and westwards in the Rift Valley, Tanzania: northern highlands)
- Lepidochrysops neonegus borealis van Someren, 1957 (northern and eastern Uganda, Kenya: north-west to Suk country)
