= Spialia wrefordi =

Scientific classification
- Domain: Eukaryota
- Kingdom: Animalia
- Phylum: Arthropoda
- Class: Insecta
- Order: Lepidoptera
- Family: Hesperiidae
- Genus: Spialia
- Species: S. wrefordi

Binomial name
- Spialia wrefordi Evans, 1951

Species of butterfly

Spialia wrefordi, Wreford's grizzled skipper, is a butterfly in the family Hesperiidae. It is found in western and southern north-eastern Uganda and central and south-eastern Kenya.
