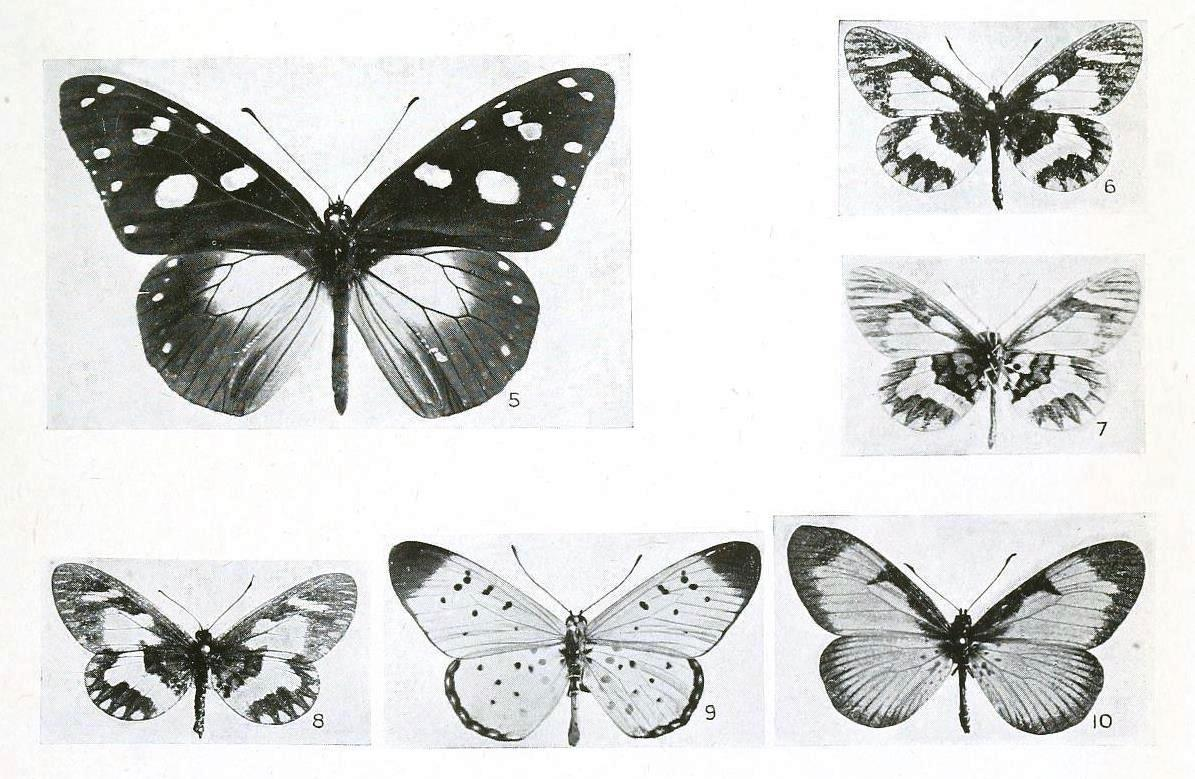
- Figures 6, 7 and 8

Scientific classification
- Kingdom: Animalia
- Phylum: Arthropoda
- Class: Insecta
- Order: Lepidoptera
- Family: Nymphalidae
- Genus: Acraea
- Species: A. rangatana

Binomial name
- Acraea rangatana Eltringham, 1912

Synonyms
- Acraea terpsichore f. rangatana Eltringham, 1912; Acraea (Actinote) rangatana; Acraea bettiana Joicey & Talbot, 1921; Acraea bettiana ab. kissenjensis Joicey and Talbot, 1921; Acraea bettiana ab. hades Joicey and Talbot, 1927; Acraea ventura basilewskyi Berger, 1956; Acraea maji Carpenter, 1935

= Acraea rangatana =

Species of butterfly

Acraea rangatana is a butterfly in the family Nymphalidae. It is found in Kenya, Uganda, Rwanda, Burundi, the Democratic Republic of the Congo and Ethiopia.

== Description ==
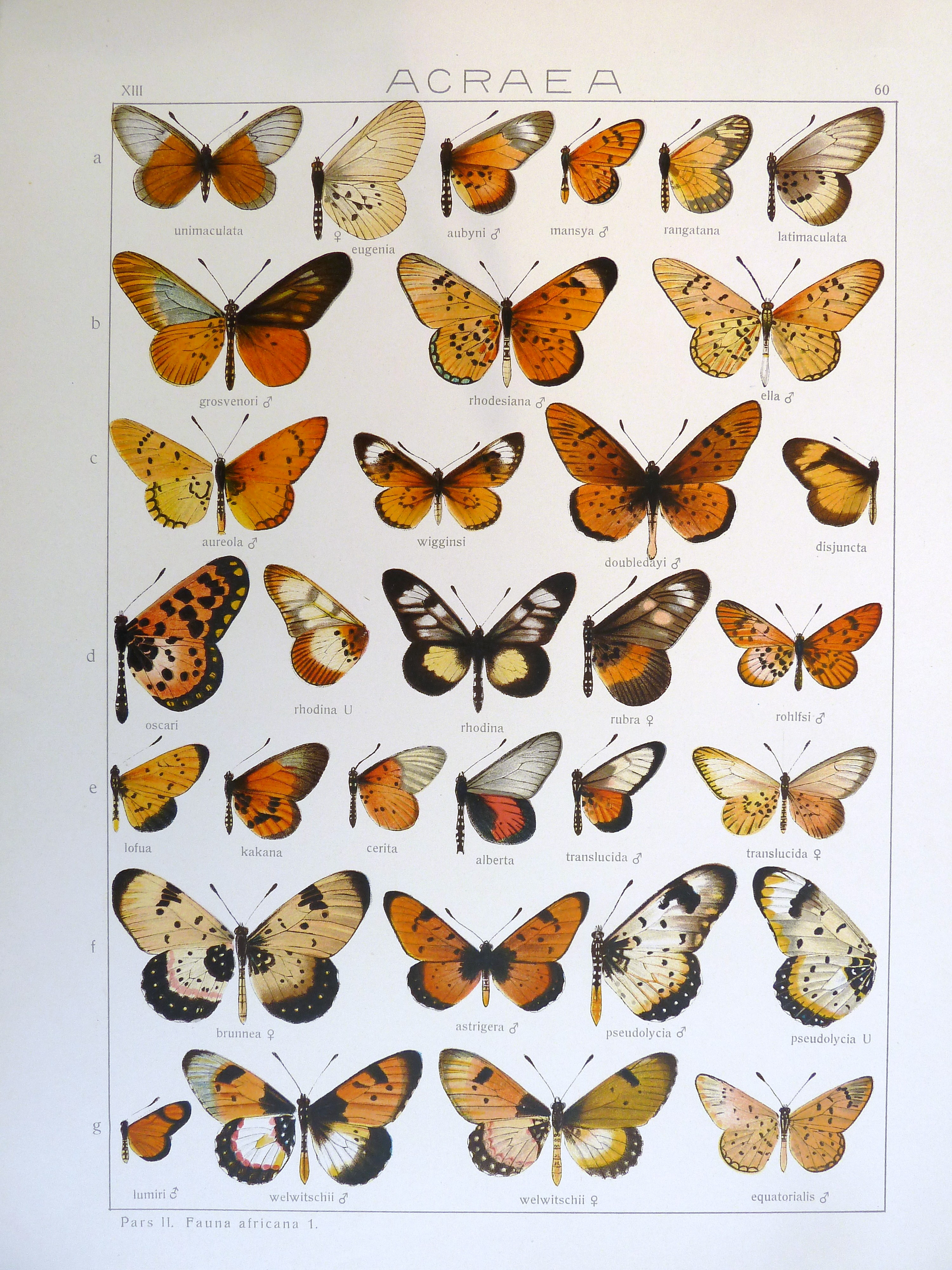
Seitz Fauna Africana taf 60

rangatana Eltr. (60 a) recalls the female of Acraea ventura, on the upper surface the dark marginal band of both wings is broader and the marginal spots are smaller and removed from the distal margin; the subapical band of the forewing is placed quite free and consists of three narrow whitish spots in cellules 4 to 6, of which the one in 6 is not half as long as the others; the ground-colour of the upper surface light ochre-yellow; hindwing beneath whitish yellow and marked almost as in ventura-, the red streaks in the basal part, however, united into a transverse band. British East Africa. -According to Trimen the larva is dull green with a white line on each side of the dorsum; dorsal and upper lateral spines black, the lower lateral spines yellow; head ochre-yellow; the first two dorsal spines projecting forwards and longer than the rest; lives on Hermannia and Triumfetta rhomboidea. Pupa whitish with the usual black markings; Fawcett has observed that pupae kept in dark boxes become slate-grey.

== Subspecies ==
- Acraea rangatana rangatana (Kenya: highlands east of the Rift Valley)
- Acraea rangatana bettiana Joicey & Talbot, 1921 (Uganda: south-west to Kigezi, Rwanda, Burundi, Democratic Republic of the Congo: northern Kivu)
- Acraea rangatana ecketti Jackson, 1951 (Kenya: highlands west of the Rift Valley)
- Acraea rangatana maji Carpenter, 1935 (south-western Ethiopia)

== Biology ==
The larvae feed on Nesaea pediculata, Alchemilla gracilipes and Rotola species.

== Taxonomy ==
Acraea rangatana is a member of the Acraea bonasia species group; see Acraea. See also Pierre & Bernaud, 2014
