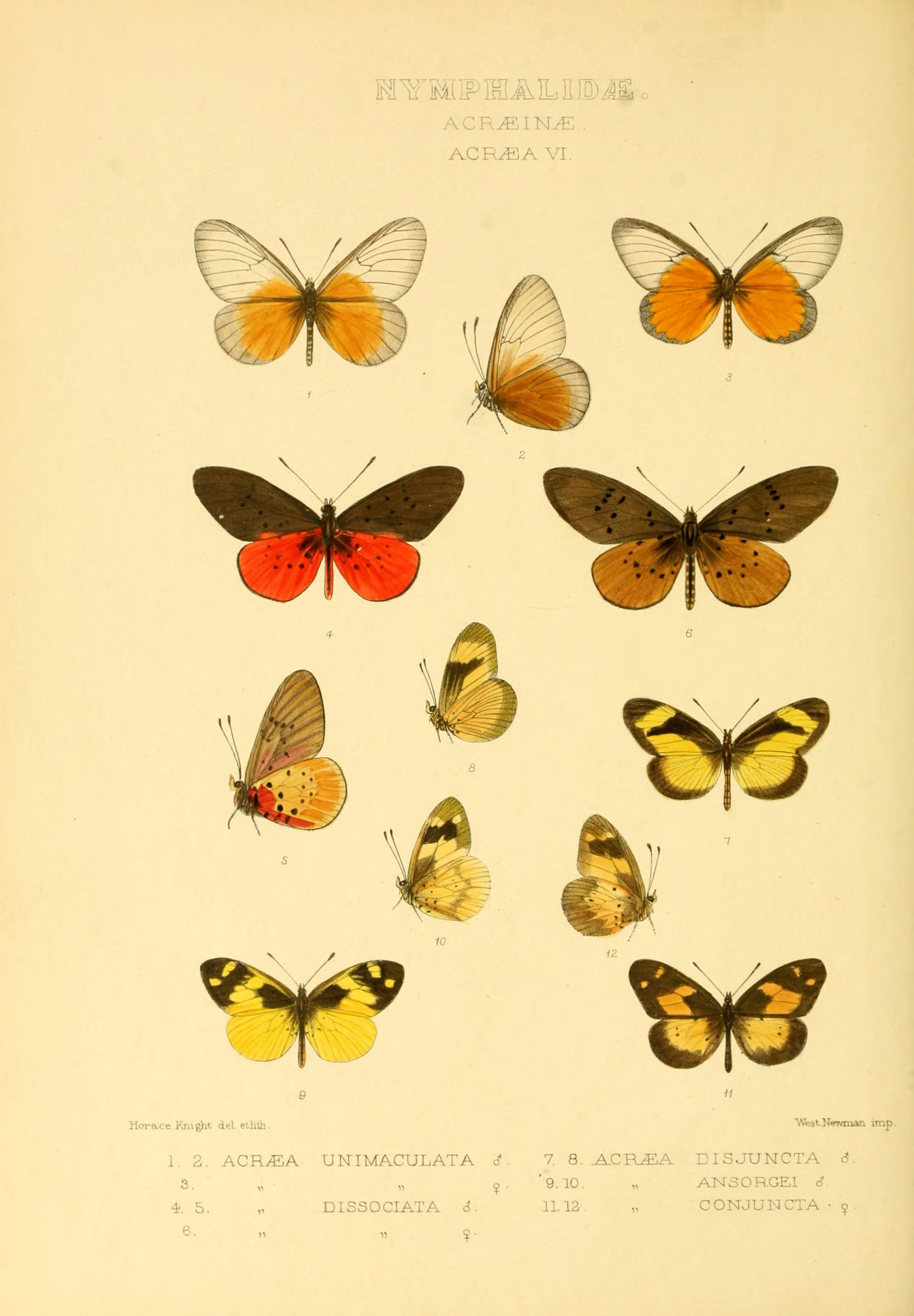
- Figures 9, 10, 11 and 12

Scientific classification
- Kingdom: Animalia
- Phylum: Arthropoda
- Class: Insecta
- Order: Lepidoptera
- Family: Nymphalidae
- Genus: Acraea
- Species: A. ansorgei

Binomial name
- Acraea ansorgei Grose-Smith, 1898

Synonyms
- Acraea (Actinote) ansorgei; Acraea conjuncta Grose-Smith, 1898; Planema nandensis Sharpe, 1899; Acraea conjuncta f. silacea Eltringham, 1912; Acraea conjuncta f. mutata Eltringham, 1912; Acraea conjuncta f. pica Eltringham, 1912; Acraea conjuncta f. lutealba Eltringham, 1912; Acraea conjuncta f. suffusa Eltringham, 1912; Acraea conjuncta f. interrupta Eltringham, 1912; Acrea ansorgei f. aurivilliana Bryk, 1925; Acrea ansorgei f. loveni Bryk, 1925; Acrea ansorgei f. jefferyi Bryk, 1925; Acraea ansorgei f. aurata Bryk, 1931; Acraea ansorgei f. vansomereni Bryk, 1931; Acraea ansorgei bantu Bryk, 1931; Acraea ansorgei f. paulinae Bryk, 1931; Acraea ansorgei f. bryki Le Doux, 1931; Acraea ansorgei f. rufoniger van Someren, 1936; Acraea ansorgei f. luteflava van Someren, 1936; Acraea ansorgei f. tricolor van Someren, 1936; Acraea ansorgei f. flavipuncta van Someren, 1936; Acraea ansorgei f. adaurantica van Someren, 1936; Acraea ansorgei f. chrysippoides van Someren, 1936; Acraea ansorgei f. flaveola van Someren, 1936; Acraea ansorgei f. wickhami Gabriel, 1939; Acraea ansorgei f. uniformis Gabriel, 1939; Acraea ansorgei f. elgonensis Howarth, 1969; Acraea ansorgei f. jacksoni Howarth, 1969; Acraea ansorgei f. gabrieli Howarth, 1969

= Acraea ansorgei =

Species of butterfly

Acraea ansorgei is a butterfly in the family Nymphalidae. It is found in Kenya, Uganda and the Democratic Republic of the Congo.

== Description ==
A. conjuncta Sm. (ansorgei) has an expanse of only 46 mm. and the sexes are similarly marked and coloured. Wings above with blackish, beneath with dark grey ground-colour; the dark ochre-yellow hindmarginal spot is about 4 mm. in breadth, reaches vein 3 without completely covering the base of cellule 2, occasionally also forms a small spot at the base of cellule 3 and joins the spot in the cell, which, however, forms almost a right angle with the hindmarginal spot; the small subapical spots are also dark yellow; the hindwing is dark yellow, at the base and the inner and distal margins blackish; the marginal band about 3 mm. in breadth. The under surface is lighter, but otherwise little different. British East Africa. f. interrupta Eltr. has the median transverse band of the forewing broken up into separate spots.- female-ab. silacea Eltr. The light markings of the upper surface are light yellow. - female-ab. mutata Eltr. only differs from silacea in having the subapical spots of the forewing white.- female-ab. pica Eltr. has all the light markings white.- female-ab. lutealba Eltr. has the light spots of the forewing orange-yellow and the median band of the hindwing white.-female-ab. suffusa Eltr. is characterized by having the fore wing blackish only at the base and apex, otherwise suffused with orange-yellow; on the hindwing the marginal band is irrorated with yellow scales.-ansorgei. A. ansorgei Sm. [species in Seitz] The forewing marked almost exactly as in conjuncta; the hindwing above unicolorous orange-yellow, beneath clearer yellow with a nebulous grey median band; the light markings are sometimes cream-yellow and the subapical dots of the fore wing white. Hitherto only females known. British East Africa.

== Taxonomy ==
It is a member of the Acraea jodutta species group.- but see also Pierre & Bernaud, 2014
