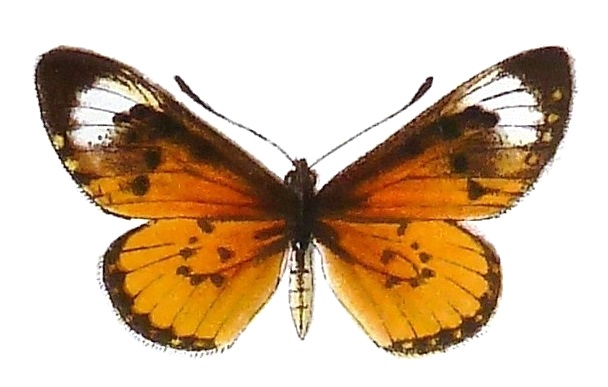
- Imago illustrated in Seitz (1900)

Scientific classification
- Kingdom: Animalia
- Phylum: Arthropoda
- Class: Insecta
- Order: Lepidoptera
- Family: Nymphalidae
- Genus: Acraea
- Species: A. wigginsi

Binomial name
- Acraea wigginsi Neave, 1904

Synonyms
- Acraea (Actinote) wigginsi; Acraea wigginsi r. occidentalis Bethune-Baker, 1926

= Acraea wigginsi =

Wiggins' acraea

Species of butterfly

Acraea wigginsi, the Wiggins' acraea, is a butterfly in the family Nymphalidae which is native to tropical Africa.

== Range ==
It is found in Cameroon, the Democratic Republic of the Congo, Uganda and Kenya.

== Description ==
A. wigginsi Neave. Forewing above blackish at the costal margin, in the apical part and at the distal margin, with a broad white subapical band in cellules 3 to 6, 9 and 10 and often also with yellow marginal spots; the cell and cellules 1a to 2 red-yellow as far as the marginal band; a black dot in the cell and a transverse spot at its apex and also discal dots in 1b to 5 or at least in 1b to 3; hindwing above golden yellow with narrow, yellow-spotted marginal band; forewing beneath as above, but lighter and at the distal margin grey with black veins; hindwing beneath light yellow with narrow white-spotted marginal band, which is proximally accompanied by gold-yellow quadrate spots, and between the discal and basal dots with an irregularly broken red transverse band, in addition with a red spot at the base of cellules 1c and 8. The female only differs in having the red-yellow colour on the forewing above less extended. Expanse 46 to 56 mm. British East Africa and Uganda.

== Subspecies ==
- Acraea wigginsi wigginsi — Democratic Republic of the Congo: Ituri, Uganda, western Kenya
- Acraea wigginsi occidentalis Bethune-Baker, 1926 — Cameroon

== Biology ==
The habitat consists of grassy edges of sub-montane forests at altitudes above 1,500 meters.

The larvae feed on Cassia zambesiacus and Kotschya strigosa.

== Taxonomy ==
It is a member of the Acraea rahira species group – but see also Pierre & Bernaud, 2014.
