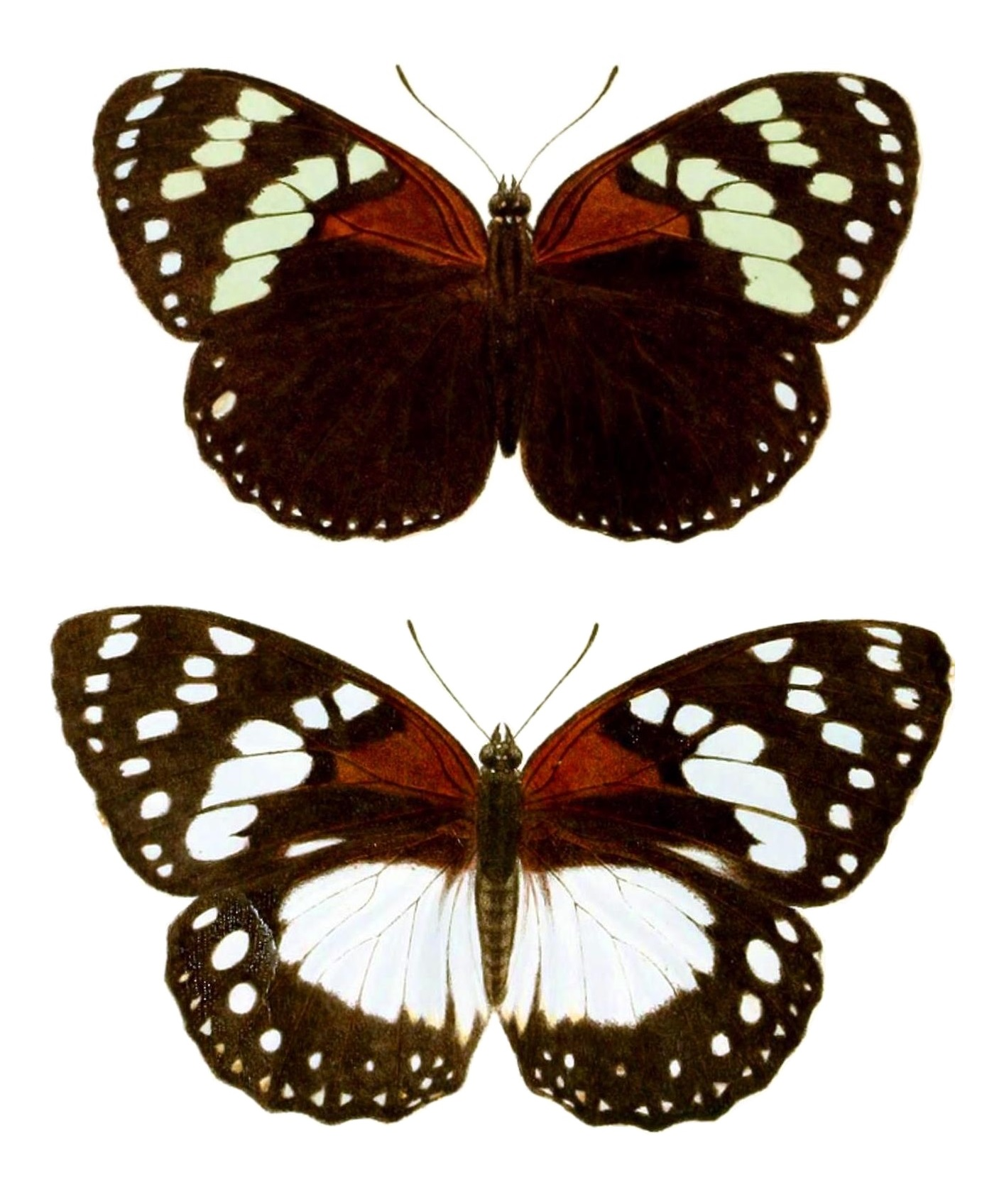
- ♂ & ♀ Euxanthe tiberius (nom. subsp.)

Scientific classification
- Domain: Eukaryota
- Kingdom: Animalia
- Phylum: Arthropoda
- Class: Insecta
- Order: Lepidoptera
- Family: Nymphalidae
- Genus: Euxanthe
- Species: E. tiberius

Binomial name
- Euxanthe tiberius Grose-Smith, 1889

Synonyms
- Euxanthe (Hypomelaena) tiberius; Charaxes tiberius; Euxanthe tiberius ab. tiberiella Strand, 1911

= Euxanthe tiberius =

Species of butterfly

Euxanthe tiberius is a butterfly in the family Nymphalidae. It is found in Kenya and Tanzania. The habitat consists of lowland evergreen forests, including coastal forests.

Both sexes are attracted to fermenting bananas.

The larvae feed on Deinbollia species.

== Subspecies ==
- Euxanthe tiberius subsp. tiberius – coast of Kenya, eastern and north-eastern Tanzania
- Euxanthe tiberius subsp. meruensis van Someren, 1936 – Kenya: eastern and north-eastern slopes of Mount Kenya

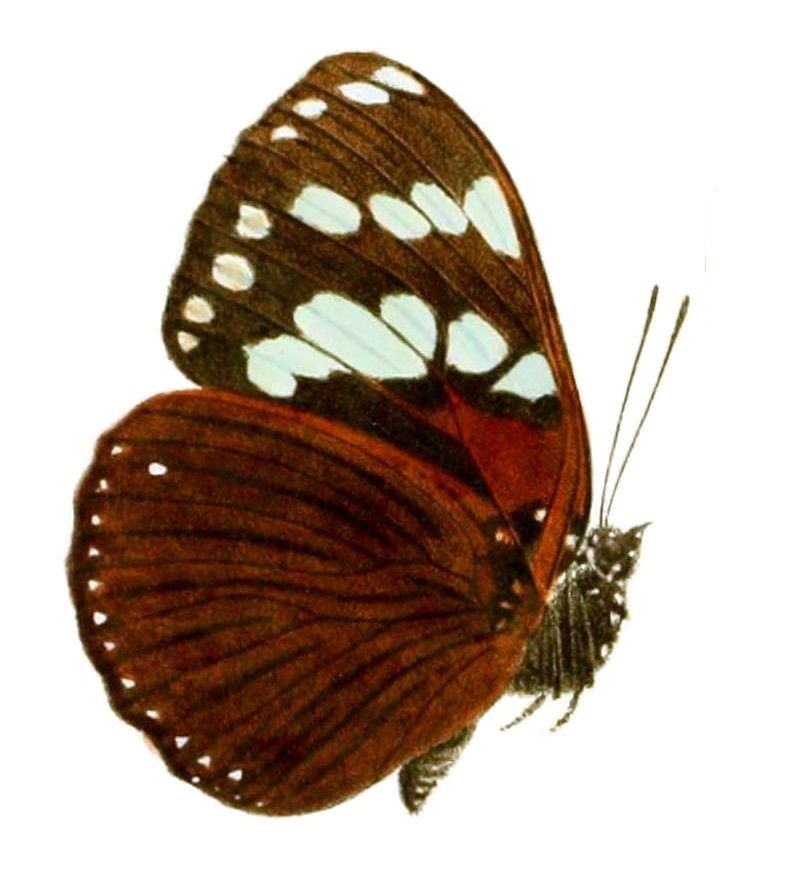
♂ underside
