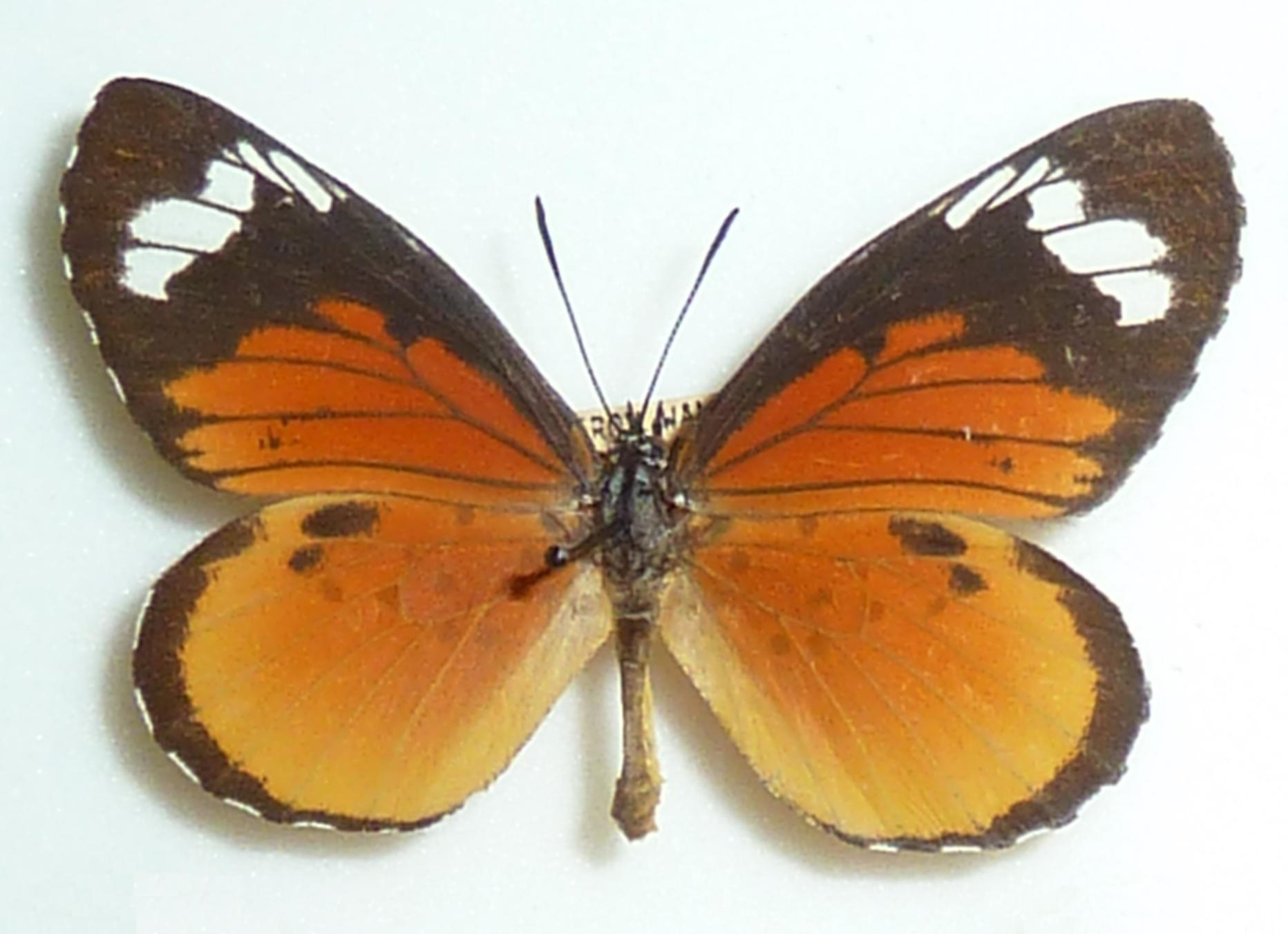

Scientific classification
- Domain: Eukaryota
- Kingdom: Animalia
- Phylum: Arthropoda
- Class: Insecta
- Order: Lepidoptera
- Family: Lycaenidae
- Genus: Mimacraea
- Species: M. marshalli

Binomial name
- Mimacraea marshalli Trimen, 1898

Synonyms
- Mimacraea marshalli media Talbot, 1937; Mimacraea marshalli nzoia Talbot, 1937; Mimacraea dohertyi Rothschild, 1901; Mimacraea marshalli dohertyi f. somereni Talbot, 1937

= Mimacraea marshalli =

Species of butterfly

Mimacraea marshalli, Marshall's acraea mimic, is a butterfly in the family Lycaenidae. It is found in Uganda, Kenya, Tanzania, Malawi, the Democratic Republic of the Congo, Zambia and Zimbabwe. The habitat consists of Brachystegia woodland in hilly country at altitudes ranging from 1,200 to 1,700 metres, as well as open woodland.

Adults feed from the secretions of scale insects (Coccoidea species). Adults are on wing from October to May.

== Subspecies ==
- Mimacraea marshalli marshalli (Uganda, Kenya, Tanzania, Malawi, Zambia, north-eastern and eastern Zimbabwe, Democratic Republic of the Congo: Sankuru, Lualaba, South Kivu and Haut-Uele)
- Mimacraea marshalli dohertyi Rothschild, 1901 (Kenya: highlands east of the Rift Valley, Tanzania: north to the Arusha district)

== Mimicry ==
M. marshalli is a Batesian mimic of another butterfly found in eastern Africa, Danaus chrysippus.
