= Metisella quadrisignatus =

Scientific classification
- Kingdom: Animalia
- Phylum: Arthropoda
- Class: Insecta
- Order: Lepidoptera
- Family: Hesperiidae
- Genus: Metisella
- Species: M. quadrisignatus

Binomial name
- Metisella quadrisignatus (Butler, 1894)

Synonyms
- Cyclopides quadrisignatus Butler, 1894

Species of butterfly

Metisella quadrisignatus, the four-spot sylph, is a butterfly in the family Hesperiidae. It is found in Sudan, Kenya, Tanzania and Malawi.

== Subspecies ==
- Metisella quadrisignatus quadrisignatus (southern Sudan, Kenya: from the south-east to the Chyulu Hills, Tanzania, Malawi)
- Metisella quadrisignatus nanda Evans, 1937 (Kenya: highlands east of the Rift Valley)
