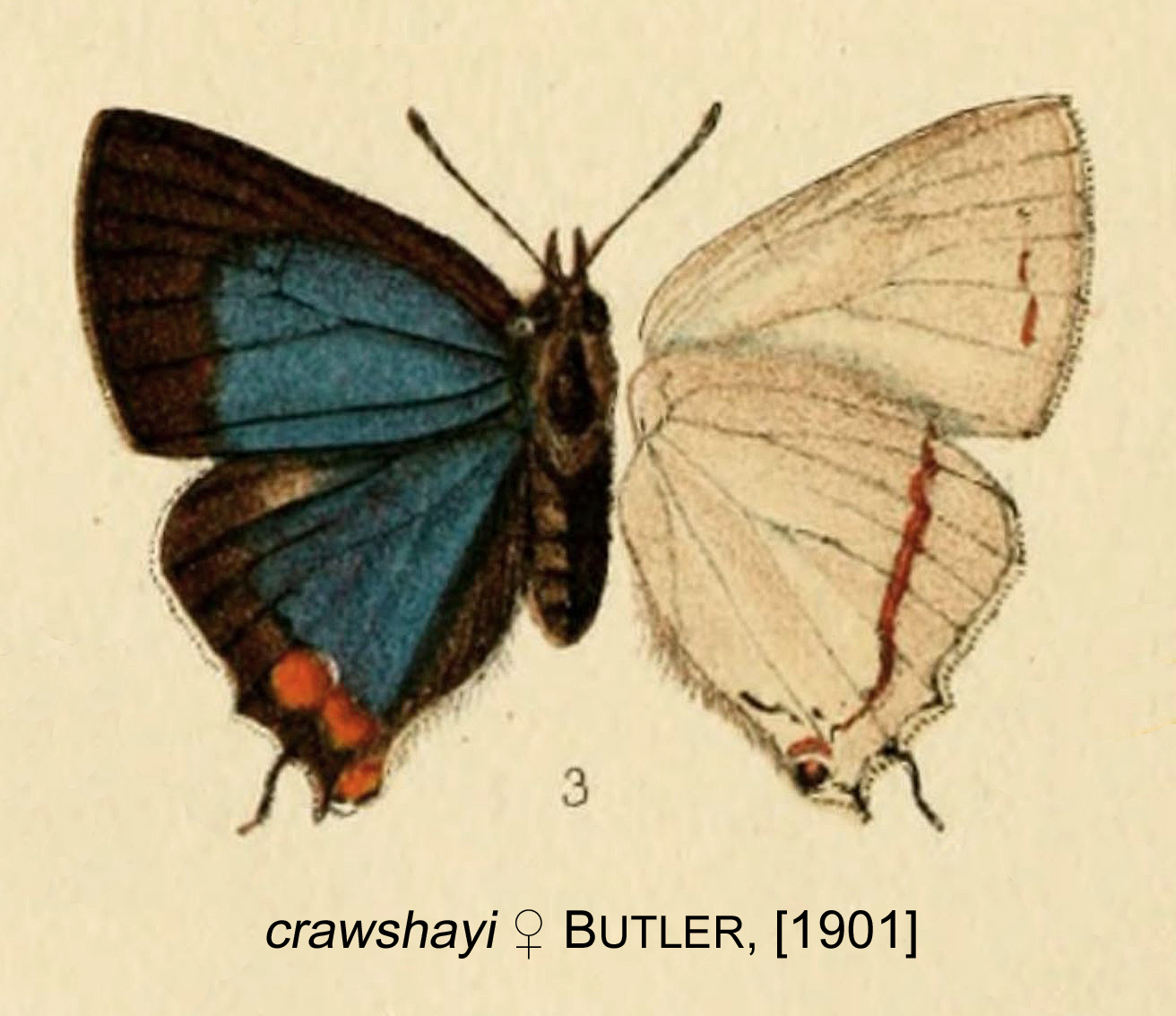

Scientific classification
- Kingdom: Animalia
- Phylum: Arthropoda
- Class: Insecta
- Order: Lepidoptera
- Family: Lycaenidae
- Genus: Iolaus
- Species: I. crawshayi

Binomial name
- Iolaus crawshayi (Butler, 1901)

Synonyms
- Argiolaus crawshayi Butler, 1901; Iolaus (Argiolaus) crawshayi; Argiolaus crawshayi elgonae Stempffer & Bennett, 1958; Argiolaus crawshayi littoralis Stempffer & Bennett, 1958; Iolaus (Argiolaus) crawshayi kalleb Koçak, 1996; Iolaus silas maureli Dufrane, 1954; Argiolaus crawshayi niloticus Stempffer & Bennett, 1958; Argiolaus crawshayi nyanzae Stempffer & Bennett, 1958

= Iolaus crawshayi =

Species of butterfly

Iolaus crawshayi, the Crawshay's sapphire, is a butterfly in the family Lycaenidae. It is found in Ethiopia, Somalia, Kenya, Uganda, the Democratic Republic of the Congo and Tanzania. The habitat consists of moist savanna.

The larvae feed on the young leaves of Erianthemum dregei and Phragmanthera usuiensis.

== Subspecies ==
- I. c. crawshayi (Kenya: highlands east of the Rift Valley)
- I. c. elgonae (Stempffer & Bennett, 1958) (Kenya, Uganda)
- I. c. littoralis (Stempffer & Bennett, 1958) (Tanzania: east and inland to Moshi and Korogwe and south to Lindi, Democratic Republic of the Congo: Shaba, Kenya: eastern lowlands and inland to Makindu, the Kitui district and Mount Marsabit)
- I. c. maureli Dufrane, 1954 (Ethiopia, southern Somalia, north-eastern Kenya)
- I. c. niloticus (Stempffer & Bennett, 1958) (Uganda: West Nile district)
- I. c. nyanzae (Stempffer & Bennett, 1958) (Kenya: western highlands, Uganda: Jinja)
