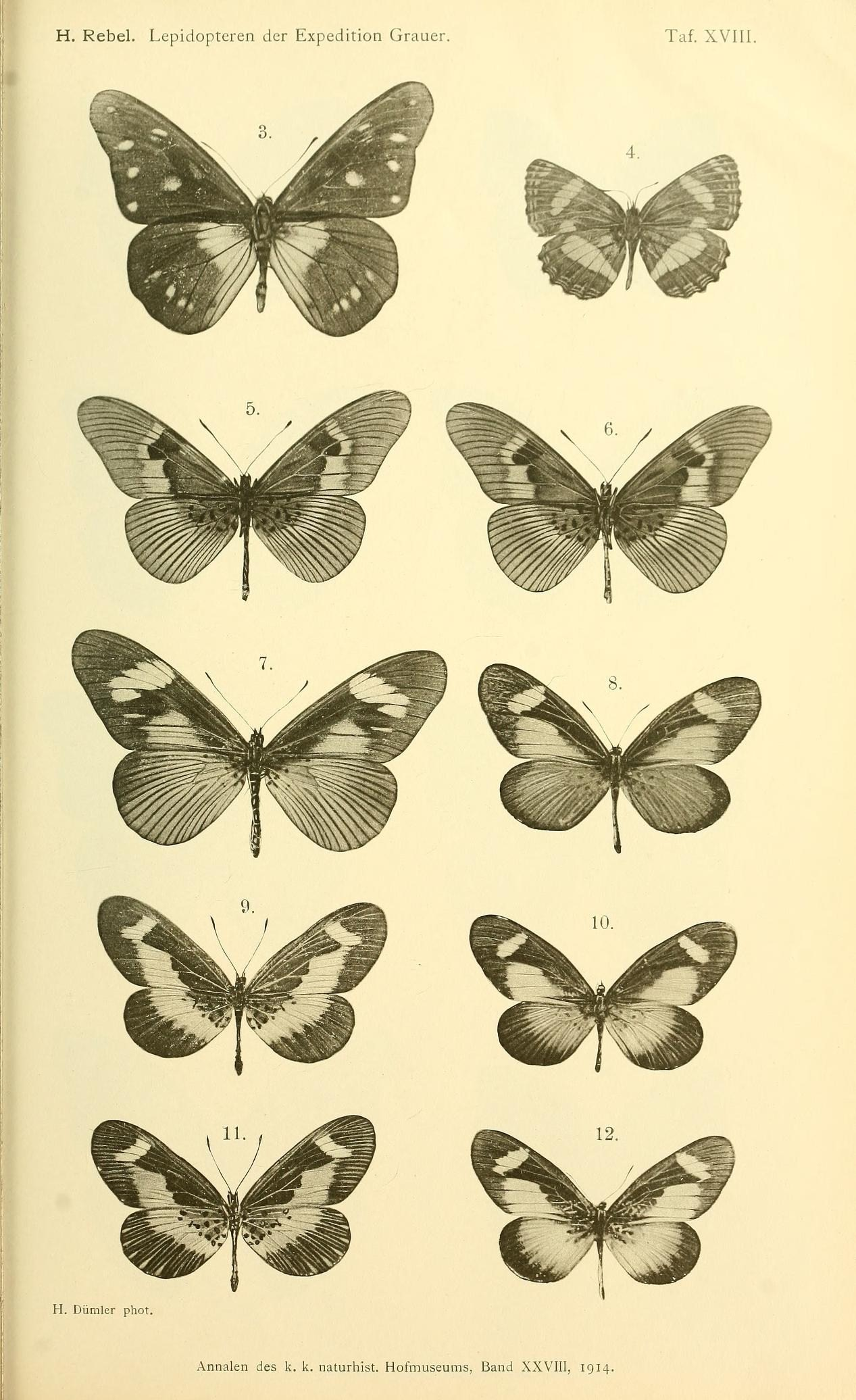

Scientific classification
- Domain: Eukaryota
- Kingdom: Animalia
- Phylum: Arthropoda
- Class: Insecta
- Order: Lepidoptera
- Family: Nymphalidae
- Genus: Amauris
- Species: A. ellioti

Binomial name
- Amauris ellioti Butler, 1895

Synonyms
- Amauris (Amaura) ellioti; Amaurina ellioti ab. styx Rebel, 1914; Amaurina ellioti ab. duponti Dufrane, 1948; Amauris ansorgei altumi van Someren, 1936; Amaurina ansorgei ab. torrefacta Le Cerf, 1920; Amaurina ansorgei var. junia Le Cerf, 1920; Amauris echeria jacksoni f. neavei Poulton, 1929

= Amauris ellioti =

Species of butterfly

Amauris ellioti, Ansorge's danaid, is a butterfly in the family Nymphalidae. It is found in the Democratic Republic of the Congo, Uganda, Rwanda, Burundi, Kenya, Tanzania, Malawi and Zambia. The habitat consists of semi-montane forests.

The larvae feed on Tylophora stolzii, Tylophora anomala, Marsdenia racemosa, Gongronema latifolium, Cynanchum, Gymnema and Secamone species.

== Subspecies ==
- Amauris ellioti ellioti (eastern Democratic Republic of the Congo, western Uganda, Rwanda, Burundi)
- Amauris ellioti altumi van Someren, 1936 (Kenya: east of the Rift Valley, Tanzania)
- Amauris ellioti ansorgei Sharpe, 1896 (Uganda: western slopes of Mount Elgon, Kenya: west of the Rift Valley)
- Amauris ellioti junia (Le Cerf, 1920) (northern Malawi, Zambia, Tanzania: north, central and southern highlands)
