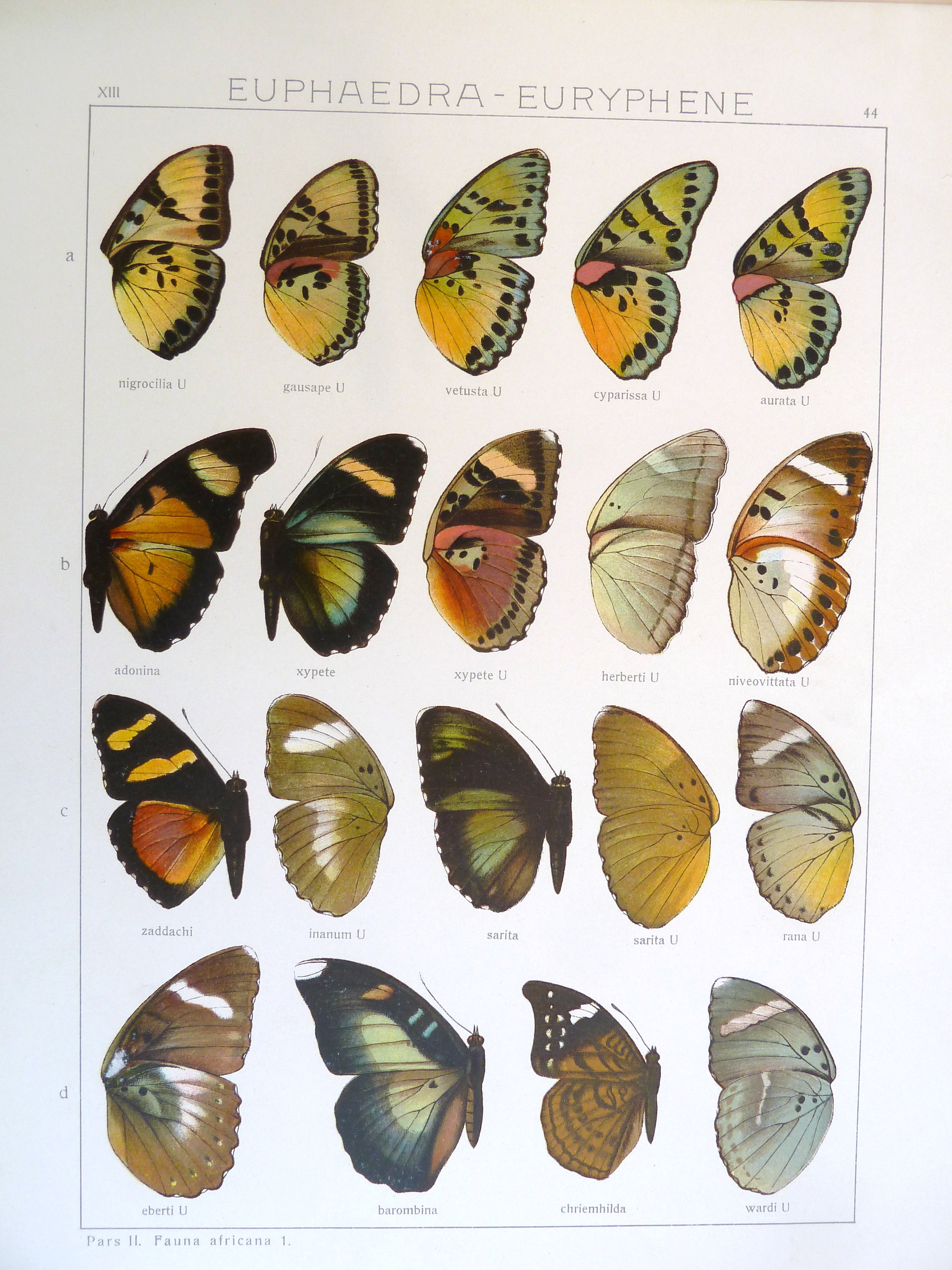
- As E. rana in Adalbert Seitz's Fauna Africana

Scientific classification
- Kingdom: Animalia
- Phylum: Arthropoda
- Class: Insecta
- Order: Lepidoptera
- Family: Nymphalidae
- Genus: Euphaedra
- Species: E. viridicaerulea

Binomial name
- Euphaedra viridicaerulea Bartel, 1905

Synonyms
- Euphaedra (Euphaedrana) viridicaerulea; Euphaedra inanoides Holland, 1920; Euphaedra ugandae f. viridis Rothschild, 1918; Euphaedra uganda f. subargentina Hecq, 1977

= Euphaedra viridicaerulea =

Species of butterfly

Euphaedra viridicaerulea, known as the brown-patch Ceres forester, is a butterfly in the family Nymphalidae. It is found in Nigeria, Cameroon, Gabon, the Democratic Republic of the Congo, the Central African Republic, Uganda and Kenya.

== Subspecies ==
- E. v. viridicaerulea (south-eastern Nigeria, Cameroon)
- E. v. inanoides Holland, 1920 (Central African Republic, central and northern Democratic Republic of the Congo)
- E. v. griseargentina Hecq, 1977 (southern Democratic Republic of the Congo)
- E. v. nitidula van Someren, 1935 (Uganda, Kenya)

== Description ==
E. viridicaerulea Bartel (formerly known as rana Stgr. i.1.) (44 c) differs from ceres in having very indistinct or absent black discal spots on the underside. It also differs from the following species in its distinct, black, bluish-margined submarginal spots on the hindwing underside. The forewing has a bluish-white subapical band, and the hindmarginal spot on the upper surface is very narrow, barely reaching the middle of cellule 1b The marginal band on the hindwing upperside lacks distinct blue spots. The forewing underside features three black spots in the cell and a black submarginal spot in cellule 1 b. The hindwing underside is yellowish, especially towards the inner margin, with one or two black dots in the cell and a black spot at the base of vein 8. The female has an indistinctly defined whitish median band, which is entirely absent in the male. This species is found in South Cameroon and Gaboon.

== Similar species ==
Other members of the Euphaedra ceres species group
