= Lepidochrysops kocak =

Scientific classification
- Kingdom: Animalia
- Phylum: Arthropoda
- Class: Insecta
- Order: Lepidoptera
- Family: Lycaenidae
- Genus: Lepidochrysops
- Species: L. kocak

Binomial name
- Lepidochrysops kocak Seven, 1997

Synonyms
- Lycaena gigantea Trimen, 1898; Catochrysops hypoleucus Butler, 1898; Cupido giganteus; Catachrysops giganteus; Neochrysops gigantea

Species of butterfly

Lepidochrysops kocak, the giant blue, is a butterfly in the family Lycaenidae. It is found in Kenya, Tanzania, Malawi, Zambia, Mozambique and eastern Zimbabwe. The habitat consists of Brachystegia woodland in hilly terrain.

Adults feed from flowers.
