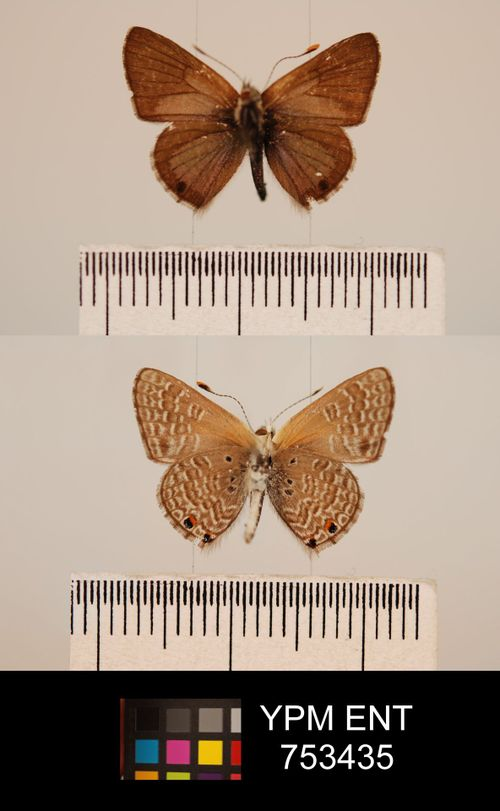

Scientific classification
- Kingdom: Animalia
- Phylum: Arthropoda
- Class: Insecta
- Order: Lepidoptera
- Family: Lycaenidae
- Genus: Anthene
- Species: A. contrastata

Binomial name
- Anthene contrastata (Ungemach, 1932)

Synonyms
- Lycaenesthes contrastata Ungemach, 1932; Lycaenesthes otacilia mashuna Stevenson, 1937

= Anthene contrastata =

Species of butterfly

Anthene contrastata, the mashuna hairtail, is a butterfly of the family Lycaenidae. It is found in eastern Africa, from South Africa, north to Ethiopia and Arabia.

The wingspan is 19–23 mm for males and 21–24 mm for females. Adults are on wing from September to June, with peaks in November and from March to April.

The larvae probably feed on Acacia species, including Acacia karroo and Acacia tortilis.

== Subspecies ==
- Anthene contrastata contrastata (Ethiopia, Yemen)
- Anthene contrastata mashuna (Stevenson, 1937) (West Cape, KwaZulu-Natal to Orange Free State, Gauteng, Mpumalanga, Limpopo Province, North West Province, North Cape, north to Zimbabwe to Kenya)
- Anthene contrastata turkana Stempffer, 1936 (northern Kenya, Somalia, north-eastern Uganda)
