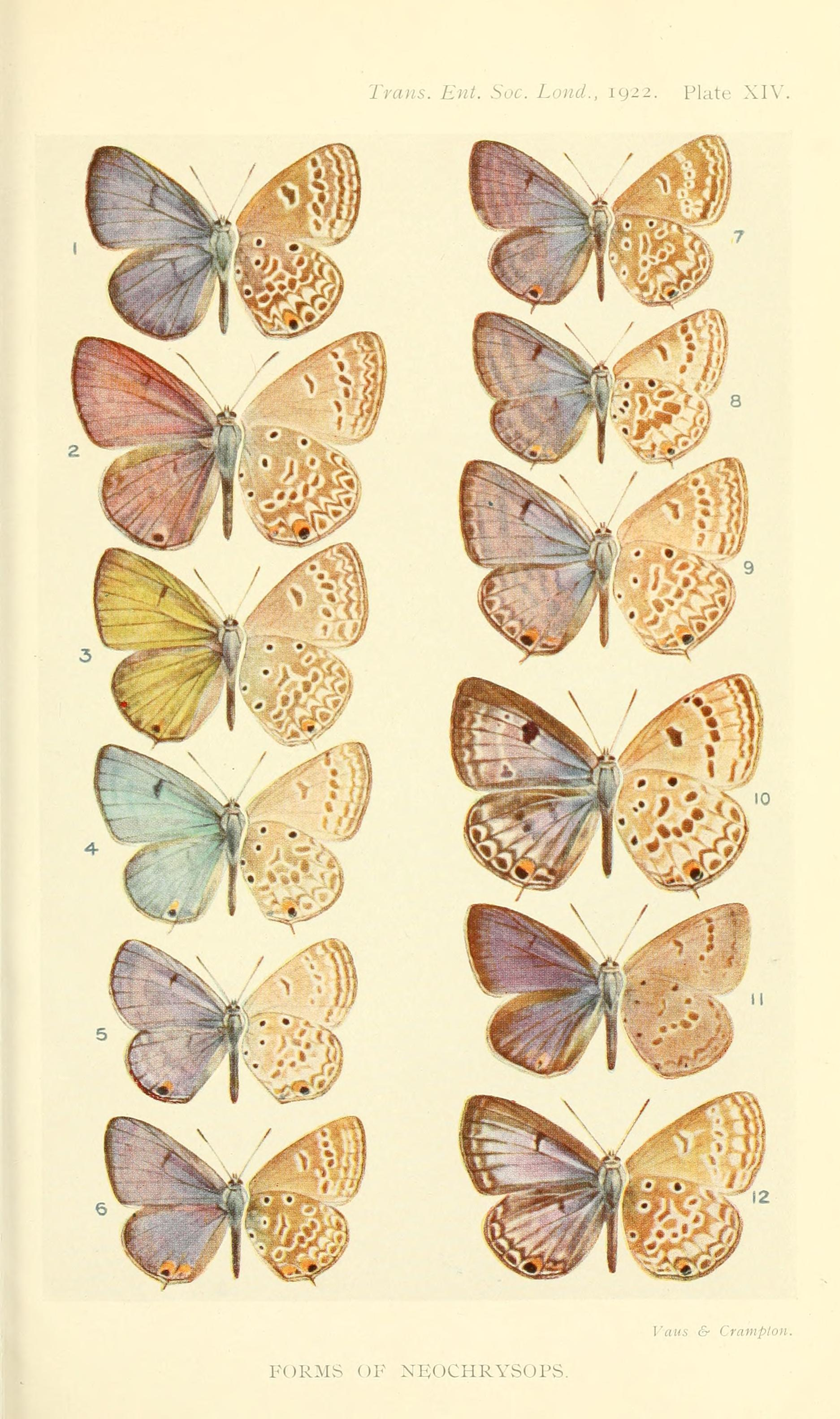
- figure 5

Scientific classification
- Kingdom: Animalia
- Phylum: Arthropoda
- Class: Insecta
- Order: Lepidoptera
- Family: Lycaenidae
- Genus: Lepidochrysops
- Species: L. polydialecta

Binomial name
- Lepidochrysops polydialecta (Bethune-Baker, [1923])

Synonyms
- Neochrysops polydialecta Bethune-Baker, [1923]

= Lepidochrysops polydialecta =

Species of butterfly

Lepidochrysops polydialecta, the lilac giant Cupid, is a butterfly in the family Lycaenidae. It is found in northern Senegal, Mali, northern Nigeria, Niger, northern Cameroon, southern Sudan, the Democratic Republic of the Congo (Lomami), northern and eastern Kenya, Somalia and possibly Uganda. The habitat consists of rocky areas in dry savanna and the Sahel.

Adults have been recorded on wing in May, July, August and September. They often hatch shortly after fires have swept through their colonial habitat.

The larvae probably feed on Ocimum species
