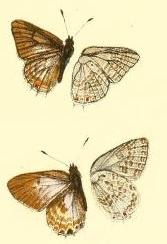

Scientific classification
- Domain: Eukaryota
- Kingdom: Animalia
- Phylum: Arthropoda
- Class: Insecta
- Order: Lepidoptera
- Family: Lycaenidae
- Genus: Anthene
- Species: A. butleri

Binomial name
- Anthene butleri (Oberthür, 1880)

Synonyms
- Lycaena (Lampides) butleri Oberthür, 1880; Lycaenesthes livida Trimen, 1881; Anthene livida galla Stempffer, 1947; Anthene livida stempfferi Storace, 1954

= Anthene butleri =

Pale hairtail

Species of butterfly

Anthene butleri, the pale hairtail or Butler's ciliate blue, is a butterfly of the family Lycaenidae. It is found from South Africa to Kenya, Uganda, and Ethiopia. In South Africa, it is found in coastal lowland forests in KwaZulu-Natal, from the coast to Kosi Bay, and inland across the Makathini Flats.

The wingspan is 23–28 mm for males and 25–32 mm for females. Adults are on wing the year-round, with a peak in the warmer months.

The larvae feed on Kalanchoe crenata, Kalanchoe lugardii and Cotyledon species, including Cotyledon orbiculata .

== Subspecies ==
- A. b. butleri (Ethiopia, southern Sudan, northern Uganda, north-west Kenya)
- A. b. arabicus Gabriel, 1954 (Yemen)
- A. b. galla Stempffer, 1947 (northern Kenya, southern Ethiopia)
- A. b. livida (Trimen, 1881) (Cape, Orange Free State, KwaZulu-Natal, Eswatini, Transvaal, Zimbabwe, Mozambique, Tanzania)
- A. b. stempfferi Storace, 1954 (Kenya: central to the Teita Hills, Tanzania)
