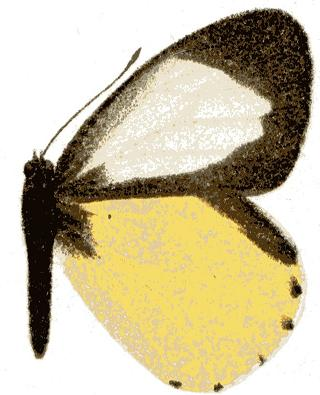
- M. j. knutssoni male
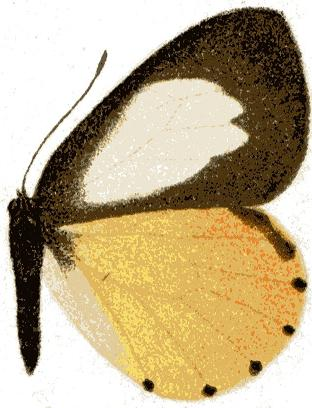
- M. j. knutssoni female

Scientific classification
- Kingdom: Animalia
- Phylum: Arthropoda
- Clade: Pancrustacea
- Class: Insecta
- Order: Lepidoptera
- Family: Pieridae
- Genus: Mylothris
- Species: M. jacksoni

Binomial name
- Mylothris jacksoni Sharpe, 1891

Synonyms
- Mylothris striata Aurivillius, 1910; Mylothris sagala jacksoni f. insignis Talbot, 1944; Mylothris sagala f. hyacinth Stoneham, 1957; Mylothris knutssoni Aurivillius, 1891; Mylothris sagala knutsoni f. discus Talbot, 1944; Mylothris sagala nagichota Talbot, 1944; Mylothris sagala sagitta Clifton, 1980

= Mylothris jacksoni =

Jackson's dotted border

Species of butterfly

Mylothris jacksoni, the Jackson's dotted border, is a butterfly in the family Pieridae. It is found in Nigeria, Equatorial Guinea (Bioko). Cameroon, Sudan, Ethiopia, the Democratic Republic of the Congo, Uganda, Rwanda, Burundi, Kenya and Tanzania. The habitat consists of submontane forests.

The larvae feed on Loranthus species.

== Subspecies ==
- M. j. jacksoni (Democratic Republic of the Congo, Uganda, Rwanda, Burundi, western and central Kenya, northern Tanzania)
- M. j. cederici Collins, 1997 (Bioko)
- M. j. cephisus Talbot, 1946 (south-eastern Kenya)
- M. j. knutssoni Aurivillius, 1891 (eastern highlands of Nigeria, highlands of Cameroon)
- M. j. nagichota Talbot, 1944 (mountains of southern Sudan, Ethiopia)
- M. j. sagitta Clifton, 1980 (Kenya)
