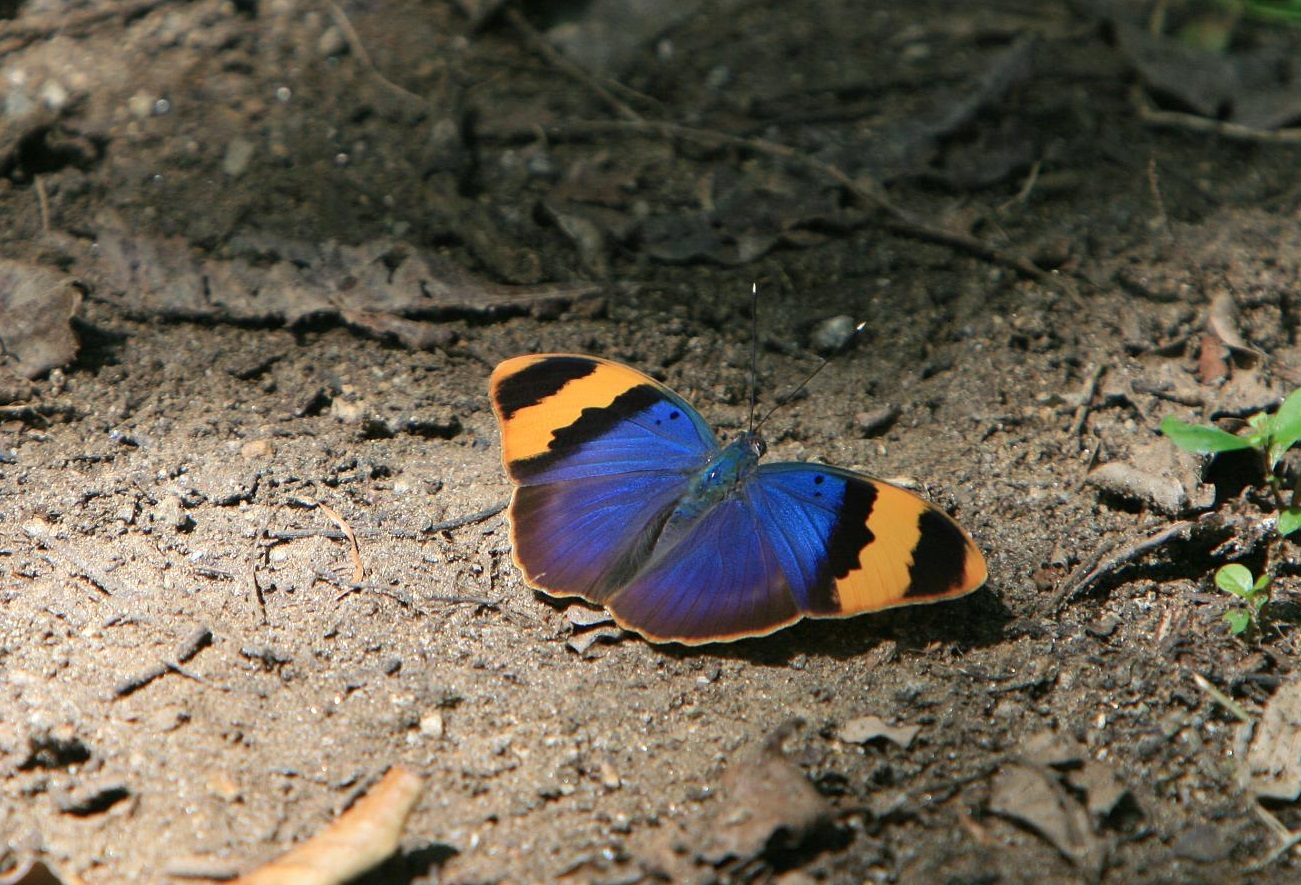

Scientific classification
- Kingdom: Animalia
- Phylum: Arthropoda
- Class: Insecta
- Order: Lepidoptera
- Family: Nymphalidae
- Genus: Euphaedra
- Species: E. neophron

Binomial name
- Euphaedra neophron (Hopffer, 1855)

Synonyms
- Romaleosoma neophron Hopffer, 1855; Euryphene violacea Butler, 1888; Romalaeosoma zambesia Felder and Felder, 1867; Euphaedra ellenbecki Pagenstecher, 1902

= Euphaedra neophron =

Gold banded forester

Species of butterfly

Euphaedra neophron, or the gold banded forester, is a butterfly of the family Nymphalidae. It is found in eastern and southern Africa.

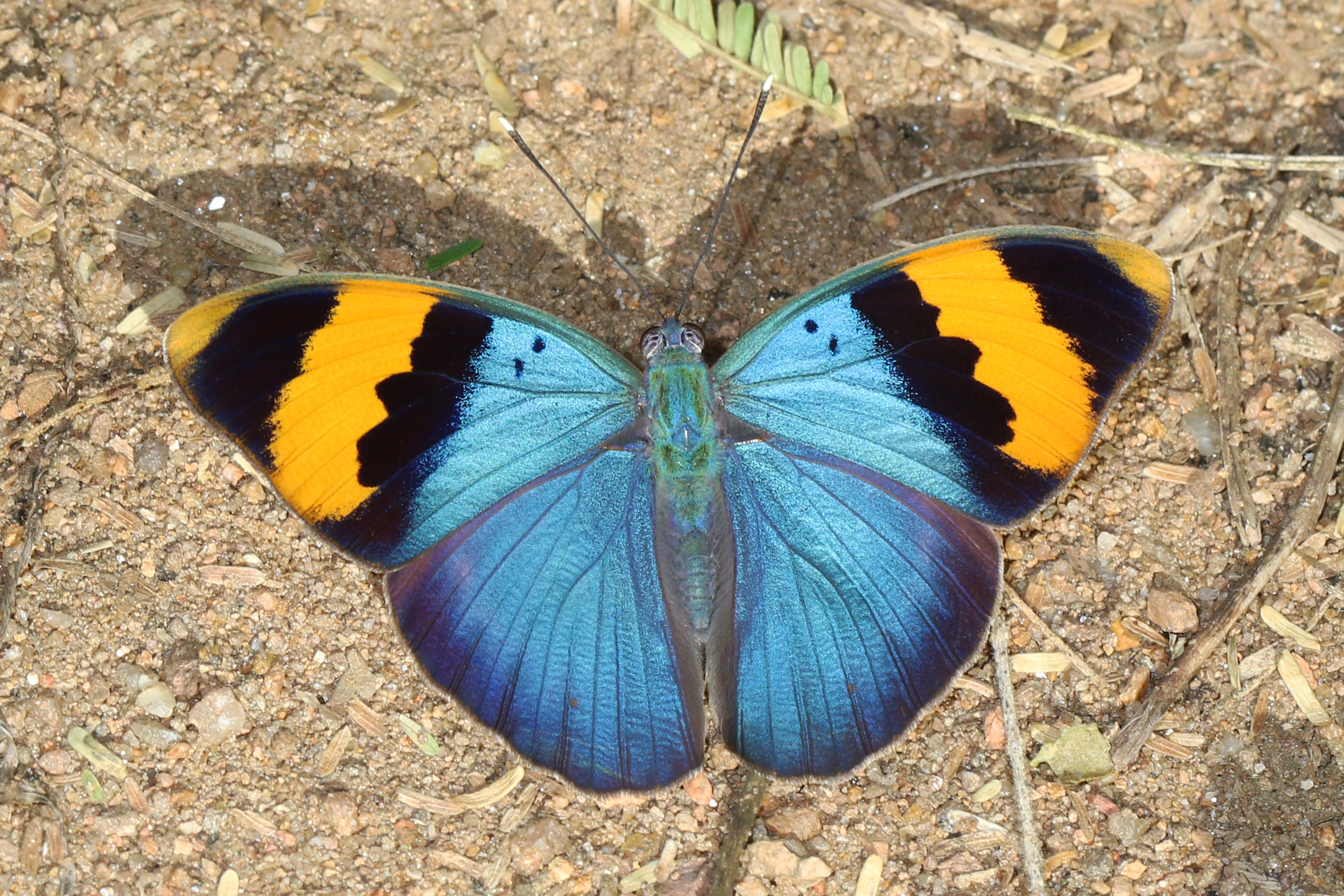
Euphaedra neophron Gorongosa National Park, Mozambique

== Description ==
1. Neophron Group. The species of this group may be easily known by having the upperside of the hindwing and the basal part of the forewing to the beginning of vein 3 similarly coloured, the apical part of the forewing on the other hand black with broad orange subapical band and yellow apex. The under surface is dark brown, grey-brown or yellowish with 1–3 black dots in the cells, lighter (male) to whitish (female) median band and oval, not very distinct postdiscal spots. The subapical band of the forewing shows through faintly. E. neophron Hpffr. The orange subapical band of the forewing reaches vein 2 or even extends somewhat into cellule lb; the basal part of the forewing and the whole upperside of the hindwing are bright green or blue-green with dark marginal band. Larva according to Junod green with two large golden yellow spots on each segment. Delagoa Bay to Usambara.-violacea Btlr. is somewhat larger and differs in having the hindwing and the basal part of the forewing above of a beautiful violet colour and in the subapical band of the fore wing not reaching vein 2; the under surface is darker than in neophron, particularly in the female. Pupa light green with golden spots. Kilimandjaro and British East Africa. E. ellenbecki Pag. entirely agrees with the preceding species in the markings, but is smaller and the hindwing and the basal part of the forewing are brown-yellow above, and but little darker than the subapical band of the forewing. Abyssinia.

== Biology ==
Adults are on wing year round, with a peak from February to July.

The larvae feed on Deinbollia oblongifolia and Blighia unijugata.

== Subspecies ==
Listed alphabetically:

- E. n. neophron (northern Tanzania to northern KwaZulu-Natal, Malawi (Usambara Mountains), eastern Zimbabwe (Chirinda Forest, Sabi Valley))
- E. n. ellenbecki Pagenstecher, 1902 (northern Kenya, southern Somalia)
- E. n. kiellandi Hecq, 1985 (southern Tanzania)
- E. n. littoralis Talbot, 1929 (south-eastern Kenya (coastal forests))
- E. n. meruensis Carpenter, 1935 (Mount Kenya)
- E. n. rydoni Howarth, 1969 (Pemba Island)
- E. n. violacea (Butler, 1888) (Kenya (Taveta, Kasigau), northern Tanzania (Mount Meru, Mount Kilimanjaro))
