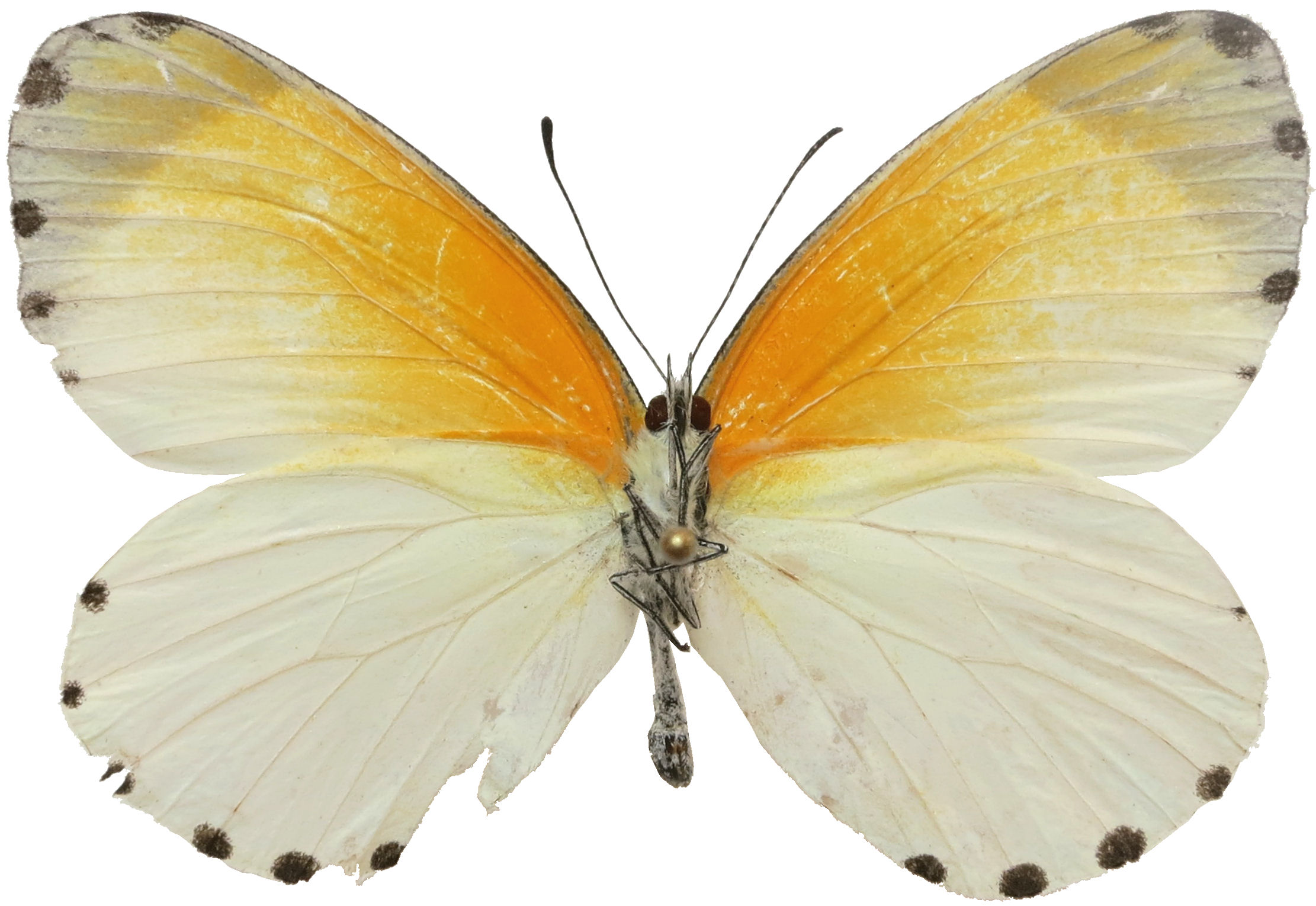
- Mylothris kiwuensis ventral view - Ituri Province, DRC

Scientific classification
- Kingdom: Animalia
- Phylum: Arthropoda
- Clade: Pancrustacea
- Class: Insecta
- Order: Lepidoptera
- Family: Pieridae
- Genus: Mylothris
- Species: M. kiwuensis

Binomial name
- Mylothris kiwuensis Grünberg, 1910

Synonyms
- Mylothris flavicosta Rebel, 1914; Mylothris rhodope r. muanensis Dufrane, 1948

= Mylothris kiwuensis =

Species of butterfly

Mylothris kiwuensis is a butterfly in the family Pieridae. It is found in the Democratic Republic of the Congo, Uganda, Rwanda, Tanzania and possibly Kenya. The habitat consists of primary forests.

The larvae feed on Santalales species.

== Subspecies ==
- M. k. kiwuensis (Rwanda, Democratic Republic of the Congo: Kivu)
- M. k. rhodopoides Talbot, 1944 (eastern Democratic Republic of the Congo, Rwanda, Uganda, north-western Tanzania, possibly Kenya)
- M. k. katera Berger, 1979 (western and southern Uganda)
- M. k. marielouisae Berger, 1979 (Democratic Republic of the Congo)
