= List of butterflies of São Tomé and Príncipe =

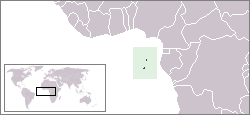
Location of São Tomé and Príncipe

This is a partial list of butterflies of São Tomé and Príncipe. More than 60 species are known from São Tomé and Príncipe, 19 of which are endemic.

== Papilionidae ==
=== Papilioninae ===
==== Papilionini ====
- Papilio nerminae Koçak, 1983 (endemic)
- Papilio dardanus sulfurea Palisot de Beauvois, 1806
- Papilio demodocus Esper, 1798

==== Leptocercini ====
- Graphium angolanus baronis (Ungemach, 1932)
- Graphium ridleyanus (White, 1843)
- Graphium leonidas leonidas (Fabricius, 1793)
- Graphium leonidas santamarthae (Joicey & Talbot, 1927)
- Graphium leonidas thomasius (Le Cerf, 1924)
- Graphium latreillianus theorini (Aurivillius, 1881)

== Pieridae ==
=== Coliadinae ===
- Catopsilia florella (Fabricius, 1775)

=== Pierinae ===
==== Pierini ====
- Leptosia nupta (Butler, 1873)
- Mylothris nubila (Möschler, 1884)
- Mylothris rembina (Plötz, 1880)
- Dixeia piscicollis Pinhey, 1972 (endemic)

== Lycaenidae ==
=== Poritiinae ===
- Liptena evanescens (Kirby, 1887)

=== Theclinae ===
- Iolaus bellina maris (Riley, 1928)
- Deudorix caliginosa Lathy, 1903
- Deudorix chalybeata Joicey & Talbot, 1926 (endemic)
- Deudorix lorisona (Hewitson, 1862)

=== Polyommatinae ===
- Euchrysops malathana (Boisduval, 1833)
- Lampides boeticus (Linnaeus, 1767)
- Leptotes pirithous (Linnaeus, 1767)
- Leptotes sanctithomae (Sharpe, 1893) (endemic)
- Zizeeria knysna (Trimen, 1862)

== Nymphalidae ==
=== Libytheinae ===
- Libythea labdaca Westwood, 1851

=== Danainae ===
==== Danaini ====
- Danaus chrysippus Linnaeus, 1758

=== Satyrinae ===
==== Melanitini ====
- Melanitis leda (Linnaeus, 1758)

==== Satyrini ====
- Bicyclus dorothea concolor Condamin & Fox, 1964
- Bicyclus medontias (Hewitson, 1873)

=== Charaxinae ===
==== Charaxini ====
- Charaxes defulvata Joicey & Talbot, 1926 (endemic)
- Charaxes thomasius Staudinger, 1886 (endemic)
- Charaxes lemosi Joicey & Talbot, 1927 (endemic)
- Charaxes odysseus Staudinger, 1892 (endemic)
- Charaxes antiquus Joicey & Talbot, 1926 (endemic)
- Charaxes barnsi Joicey & Talbot, 1927 (endemic)
- Charaxes monteiri Staudinger, 1886 (endemic)

=== Nymphalinae ===
==== Nymphalini ====
- Junonia cymodoce lugens (Schultze, 1912)
- Precis sinuata Plötz, 1880
- Hypolimnas misippus Linnaeus, 1764
- Hypolimnas anthedon Doubleday, 1845
- Hypolimnas salmacis thomensis Aurivillius, 1910

=== Cyrestinae ===
==== Cyrestini ====
- Cyrestis camillus (Fabricius, 1781)

=== Biblidinae ===
==== Epicaliini ====
- Sevenia boisduvali insularis (Joicey & Talbot, 1926)

=== Limenitinae ===
==== Limenitidini ====
- Pseudacraea lucretia gamae Joicey & Talbot, 1927

==== Neptidini ====
- Neptis eltringhami Joicey & Talbot, 1926 (endemic)
- Neptis larseni Wojtusiak & Pyrcz, 1997 (endemic)

=== Heliconiinae ===
==== Acraeini ====
- Acraea annobona d'Abrera, 1980
- Acraea medea (Cramer, 1775) (endemic)
- Acraea niobe Sharpe, 1893 (endemic)
- Acraea alcinoe racaji (Pyrcz, 1991)
- Acraea insularis Sharpe, 1893 (endemic)
- Acraea jodutta (Fabricius, 1793)
- Acraea newtoni Sharpe, 1893 (endemic)
- Acraea neobule Doubleday, 1847

== Hesperiidae ==
=== Coeliadinae ===
- Coeliades bocagii (Sharpe, 1893) (endemic)
- Coeliades hanno (Plötz, 1879)

=== Hesperiinae ===
==== Aeromachini ====
- Andronymus neander thomasi Riley, 1928

==== Baorini ====
- Borbo fatuellus thomea (Evans, 1937)
- Borbo perobscura (Druce, 1912)

== See also ==
- List of moths of São Tomé and Príncipe
- Wildlife of São Tomé and Príncipe
