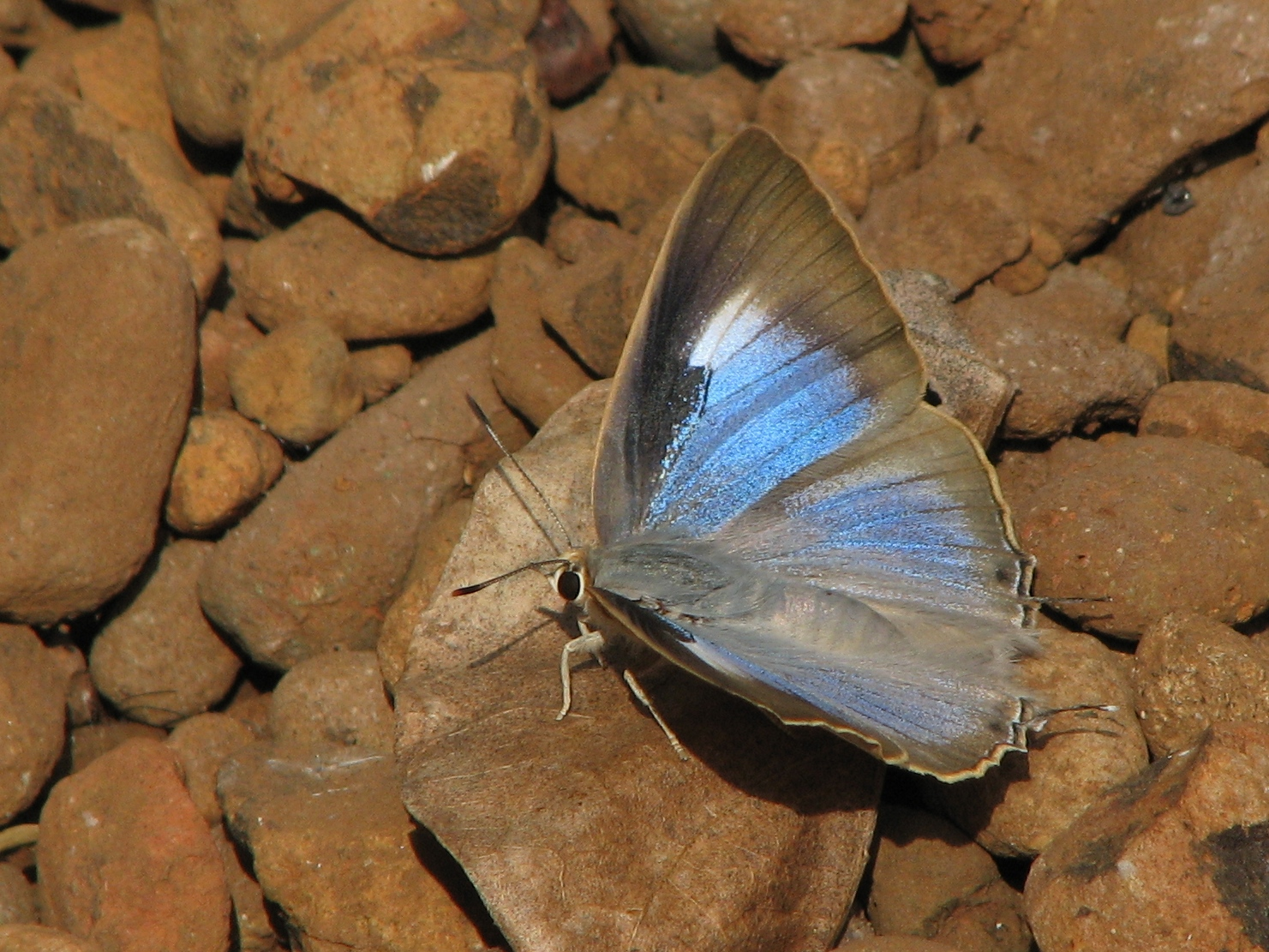
- Virachola perse

Scientific classification
- Domain: Eukaryota
- Kingdom: Animalia
- Phylum: Arthropoda
- Class: Insecta
- Order: Lepidoptera
- Family: Lycaenidae
- Tribe: Deudorigini
- Genus: Virachola

= Virachola =

Butterfly genus or subgenus in family Lycaenidae

Virachola is a group of butterfly species in the family Lycaenidae. It was previously considered a valid genus, but recent authors consider it a subgenus of Deudorix.

Species include:

- Virachola isocrates - common guava blue
- Virachola perse - large guava blue
