= List of lycaenid genera: V =

The large butterfly family Lycaenidae contains the following genera starting with the letter V:

- Virachola
