= Charaxes octavus =

Scientific classification
- Domain: Eukaryota
- Kingdom: Animalia
- Phylum: Arthropoda
- Class: Insecta
- Order: Lepidoptera
- Family: Nymphalidae
- Genus: Charaxes
- Species: C. octavus

Binomial name
- Charaxes octavus Minig, 1972

Synonyms
- Charaxes patergodarti Neidhoefer, 1972

Species of butterfly

Charaxes octavus is a butterfly in the family Nymphalidae. It is found in the Central African Republic. The habitat consists of tropical forests.

== Taxonomy ==
Known from a single specimen from the type locality only. Probably a hybrid of brutus and lucretius.

Charaxes lucretius group.

The members are:

- Charaxes lucretius
- Charaxes octavus
- Charaxes odysseus
