= Deudorix kayonza =

Scientific classification
- Kingdom: Animalia
- Phylum: Arthropoda
- Clade: Pancrustacea
- Class: Insecta
- Order: Lepidoptera
- Family: Lycaenidae
- Genus: Deudorix
- Species: D. kayonza

Binomial name
- Deudorix kayonza Stempffer, 1956

Synonyms
- Deudorix (Virachola) kayonza

Species of butterfly

Deudorix kayonza, the false coffee playboy, is a butterfly in the family Lycaenidae. It is found in Sierra Leone, Ivory Coast, Ghana, Cameroon, the Republic of the Congo, the Central African Republic, the eastern part of the Democratic Republic of the Congo, western Uganda and Zambia. The habitat consists of forests.

Adults feed from the flowers of Eupatorium odorata.
