= Deudorix edwardsi =

Scientific classification
- Kingdom: Animalia
- Phylum: Arthropoda
- Clade: Pancrustacea
- Class: Insecta
- Order: Lepidoptera
- Family: Lycaenidae
- Genus: Deudorix
- Species: D. edwardsi

Binomial name
- Deudorix edwardsi Gabriel, 1939

Synonyms
- Deudorix (Virachola) edwardsi

Species of butterfly

Deudorix edwardsi is a butterfly in the family Lycaenidae. It is found in the Rwenzori Mountains of Uganda and the Democratic Republic of the Congo.
