= Deudorix nicephora =

Scientific classification
- Kingdom: Animalia
- Phylum: Arthropoda
- Clade: Pancrustacea
- Class: Insecta
- Order: Lepidoptera
- Family: Lycaenidae
- Genus: Deudorix
- Species: D. nicephora

Binomial name
- Deudorix nicephora Hulstaert, 1924

Synonyms
- Deudorix (Virachola) nicephora

Species of butterfly

Deudorix nicephora is a butterfly in the family Lycaenidae. It is found in the Democratic Republic of the Congo and Angola.
