= Deudorix dinomenes =

Orange playboy

Scientific classification
- Kingdom: Animalia
- Phylum: Arthropoda
- Clade: Pancrustacea
- Class: Insecta
- Order: Lepidoptera
- Family: Lycaenidae
- Genus: Deudorix
- Species: D. dinomenes

Binomial name
- Deudorix dinomenes Grose-Smith, 1887

Synonyms
- Virachola dinomenes; Deudorix (Virachola) dinomenes; Deudorix diomedes Jackson, 1966

Species of butterfly

Deudorix dinomenes, the orange playboy, is a butterfly of the family Lycaenidae. It is found in Senegal, Guinea, Sierra Leone, Ivory Coast, Ghana, Benin, Nigeria, Cameroon, the Central African Republic, the Democratic Republic of the Congo, Uganda, Sudan, Kenya, Tanzania, Malawi, Zambia, Zimbabwe, Mozambique and South Africa.

The wingspan is 24–30 mm for males and 26–32 mm for females. Adults are on wing year-round with a peak from April to July.

The larvae probably feed on the fruit of Deinbollia species

== Subspecies ==
- Deudorix dinomenes dinomenes (coast of Kenya, Tanzania, Malawi, Zambia, eastern Zimbabwe, Mozambique, South Africa: KwaZulu-Natal to the north)
- Deudorix dinomenes diomedes Jackson, 1966 (Senegal, Guinea, Sierra Leone, Ivory Coast, Ghana, Benin, western Nigeria, Cameroon, Central African Republic, Democratic Republic of the Congo, southern Sudan, Uganda, Kenya: west to the Kakamega Forest, western Tanzania)

Torben Larsen developed a species numbering system for his 2005 publication Butterflies of West Africa. The subspecies diomedes is #499. The 'Larsen' numbers have since been used with permission in A Sharp Eye on Butterflies of Ghana.
