= Deudorix renidens =

Scientific classification
- Kingdom: Animalia
- Phylum: Arthropoda
- Clade: Pancrustacea
- Class: Insecta
- Order: Lepidoptera
- Family: Lycaenidae
- Genus: Deudorix
- Species: D. renidens

Binomial name
- Deudorix renidens (Mabille, 1884)

Synonyms
- Hypolycaena renidens Mabille, 1884; Deudorix (Virachola) renidens

Species of butterfly

Deudorix renidens is a butterfly in the family Lycaenidae. It is found on Madagascar.
