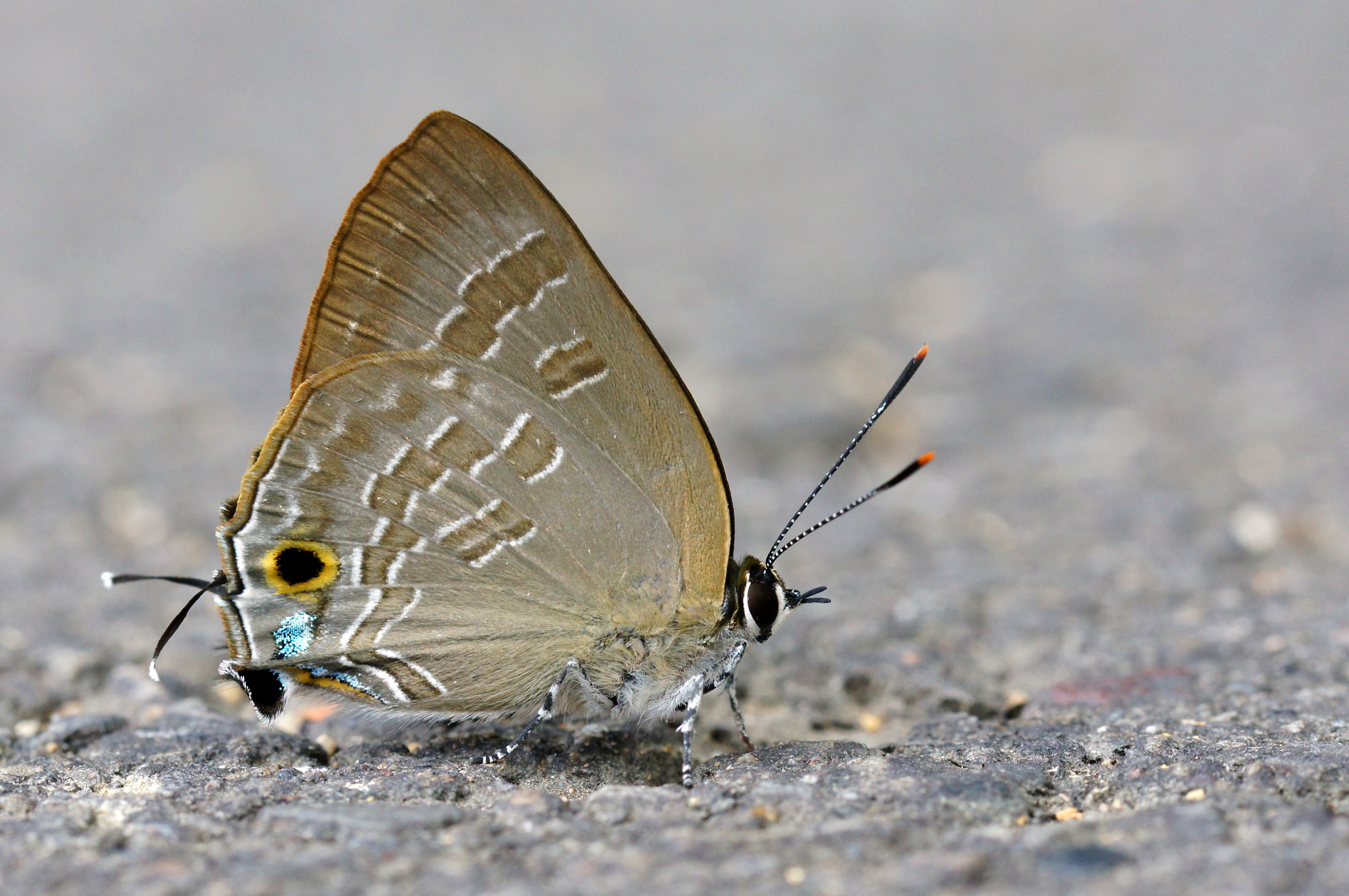

Scientific classification
- Kingdom: Animalia
- Phylum: Arthropoda
- Clade: Pancrustacea
- Class: Insecta
- Order: Lepidoptera
- Family: Lycaenidae
- Genus: Deudorix
- Species: D. epijarbas

Binomial name
- Deudorix epijarbas (Moore, 1857)

Synonyms
- Thecla epijarbas Moore, [1858]; Aphnaeus epijarbas Doubleday, 1847 (nomen nudum); Deudorix ancus Fruhstorfer, 1912; Deudorix amatius Fruhstorfer, 1912; Deudorix cinnabarus Fruhstorfer, 1912; Deudorix mesarchus Fruhstorfer, 1912; Deudorix coriolanus Fruhstorfer, 1912; Deudorix megakles Fruhstorfer, 1912; Deudorix menesicles Fruhstorfer, 1912; Deudorix dido Waterhouse, 1934

= Deudorix epijarbas =

Cornelian

Species of butterfly

Deudorix epijarbas, the cornelian or hairy line blue, is a species of lycaenid or blue butterfly found in south and southeast Asia from India to Fiji, including the Philippines, and also the tropical coast of Queensland in Australia. The species was first described by Frederic Moore in 1857.

== Description ==
Male. Upperside scarlet-red. Forewing with broad black costal and outer marginal borders, the costal band has its inner margin somewhat curved, being limited by the median vein, consequently it is broadest at the apex, its inner edge on the outer margin is uneven, and at the hinder angle the black band is continued for a short distance along the hinder margin; the rest of the hinder margin is narrowly suffused with black, and so is the sub-median vein. Hindwing with the costa, base and abdominal area suffused with lilackish, the abdominal fold brown, outer marginal line finely black, anal lobe black with a small red mark in it; tail black, tipped with white, the veins often more or less finely black. Antennae black, ringed with white, club with a red tip and with a white streak on the underside below it. Underside greyish-brown, markings indicated by their white edges. Forewing with a thick bar, with a pale white line splitting it at the end of the cell; a discal almost straight rather broad band narrowing gradually hindwards, a sub-marginal series of thick lunular marks, edged outwardly with white, its lower end close to the lower end of the discal band. Hindwing with a thick bar with a pale white line running through it, at the end of the cell; a discal series of seven conjoined spots, the upper six squarish, the seventh angled, the series irregular, the second spot a little outwards, the fifth a little inwards, touching the lower end of the spot of the discoidal band, decreasing in size hindwards, the angular .spot running in on to the abdominal margin one-third above the anal augle, a submarginal series of similar spots, increasing in size liinclwards, anal lobe black, a linear white mark, and a curved streak of metallic blue scales above it, a black spot in the first interspace, ringed with orange. Female. Upperside fulvous-brown. Forewing with some fulvous suffusion below the median vein, varying in extent in different examples. Hindwing with the abdominal fold pale, in some examples without any markings, in some the entire wing is tinted with fulvous, and sometimes there are indications of a series of fulvous submarginal spots. Underside as in the male, the ground colour often much paler.

— Charles Swinhoe, Lepidoptera Indica: Volume IX

The wingspan is about 30 mm.

The larvae feed on Sapindus trifoliatus, Euphoria longan, Litchi chinensis, Aesculus indicus, Connarus species (in seed capsules), Harpullia pendula, Pometia pinnata, Caryota rumphiana and Sarcopteryx martyana.

== Subspecies ==
The subspecies are:

- D. e. epijarbas (south India, Sri Lanka)
- D. e. ancus Fruhstorfer, 1912 (northern India)
- D. e. amatius Fruhstorfer, 1912 (Assam to northern Thailand, Indo China)
- D. e. cinnabarus Fruhstorfer, 1912 (southern Thailand to Sundaland)
- D. e. terenzius Fruhstorfer (Nias)
- D. e. enganicus Fruhstorfer (Enggano)
- D. e. mesarchus Fruhstorfer, 1912 (Lesser Sunda Islands)
- D. e. corolianus Fruhstorfer, 1912 (Palawan, Philippines)
- D. e. megakles Fruhstorfer, 1912 (Sulawesi)
- D. e. menesicles Fruhstorfer, 1912 (Taiwan)
- D. e. dido Waterhouse, 1934 (Kuranda, Cairns)
- D. e. biaka Joicey & Talbot (Biak)
- D. e. turbo Fruhstorfer (Moluccas, Waigeu, Misool, Kai, West Irian to Papua, Manam, Tagula)
- D. e. diovella Waterhouse, 1920 (Fiji)
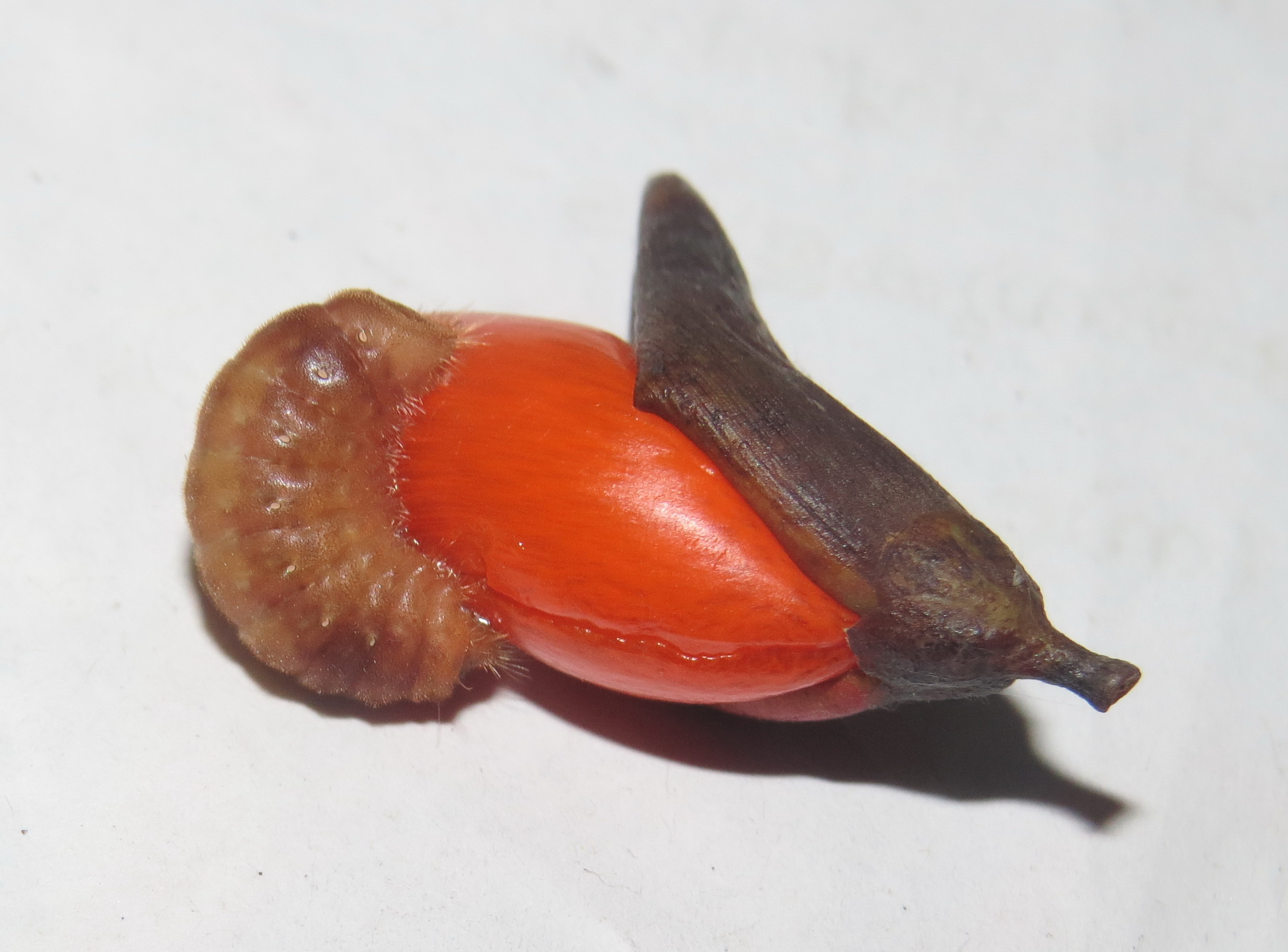
Larva

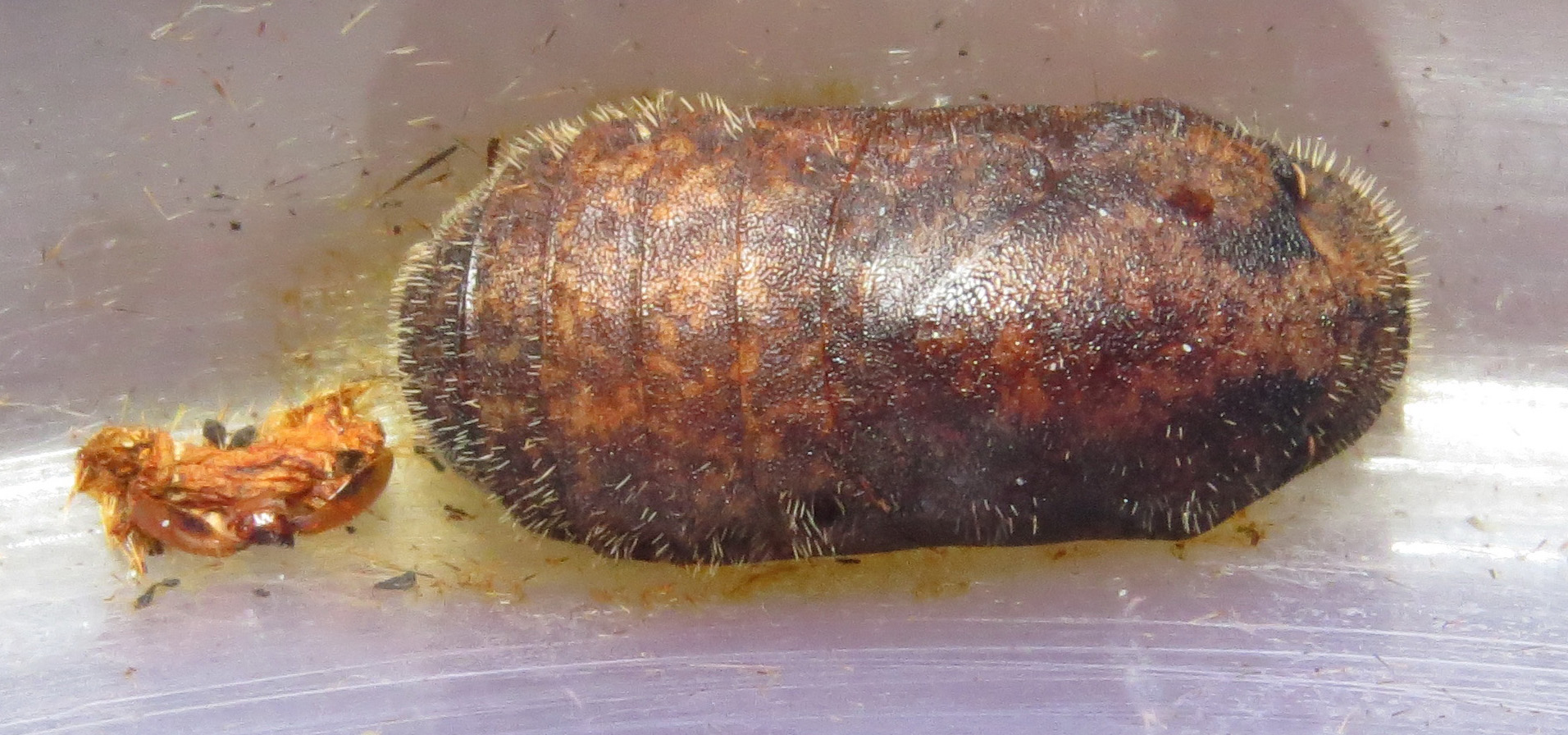
Pupa

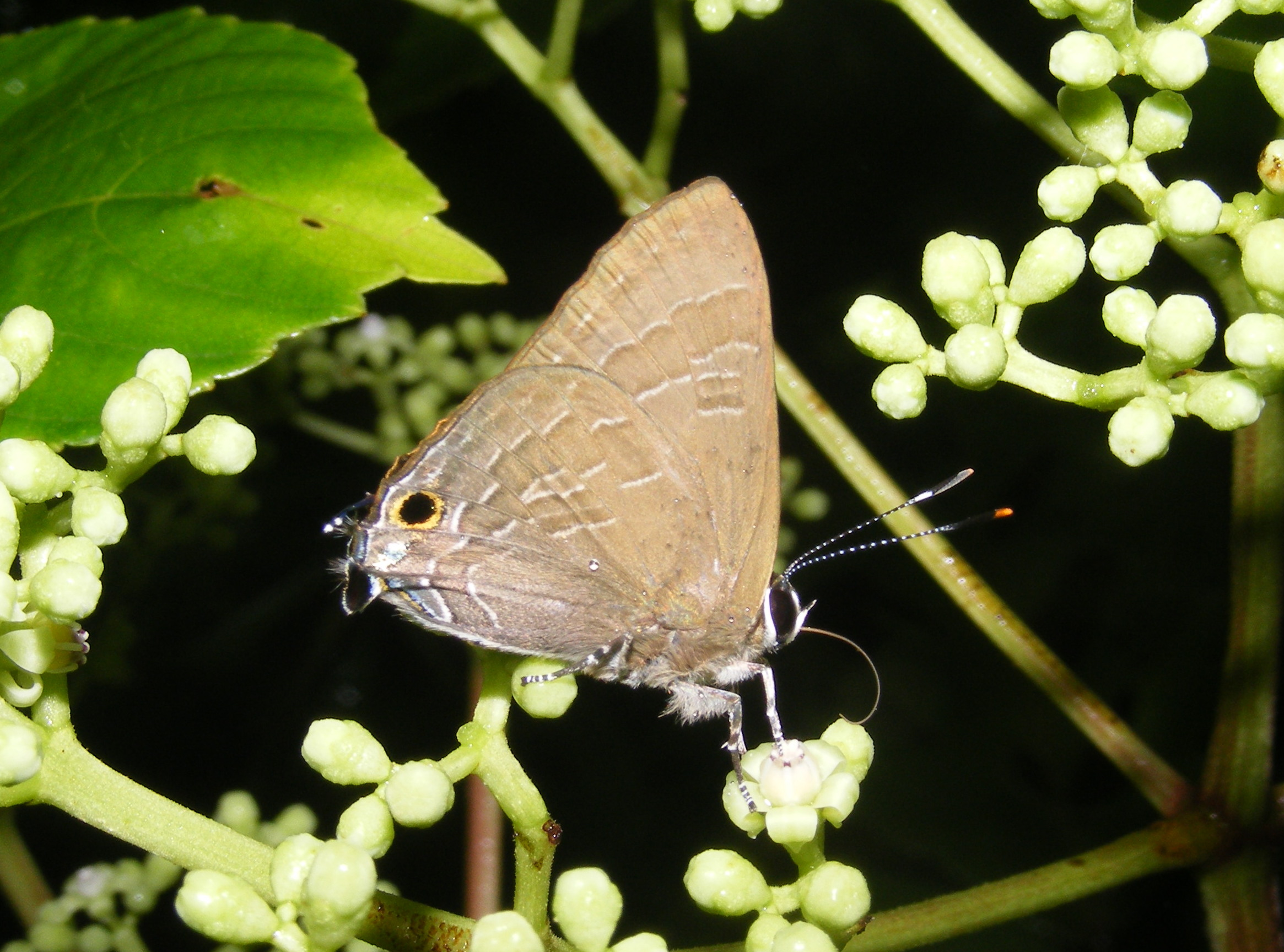
Adult

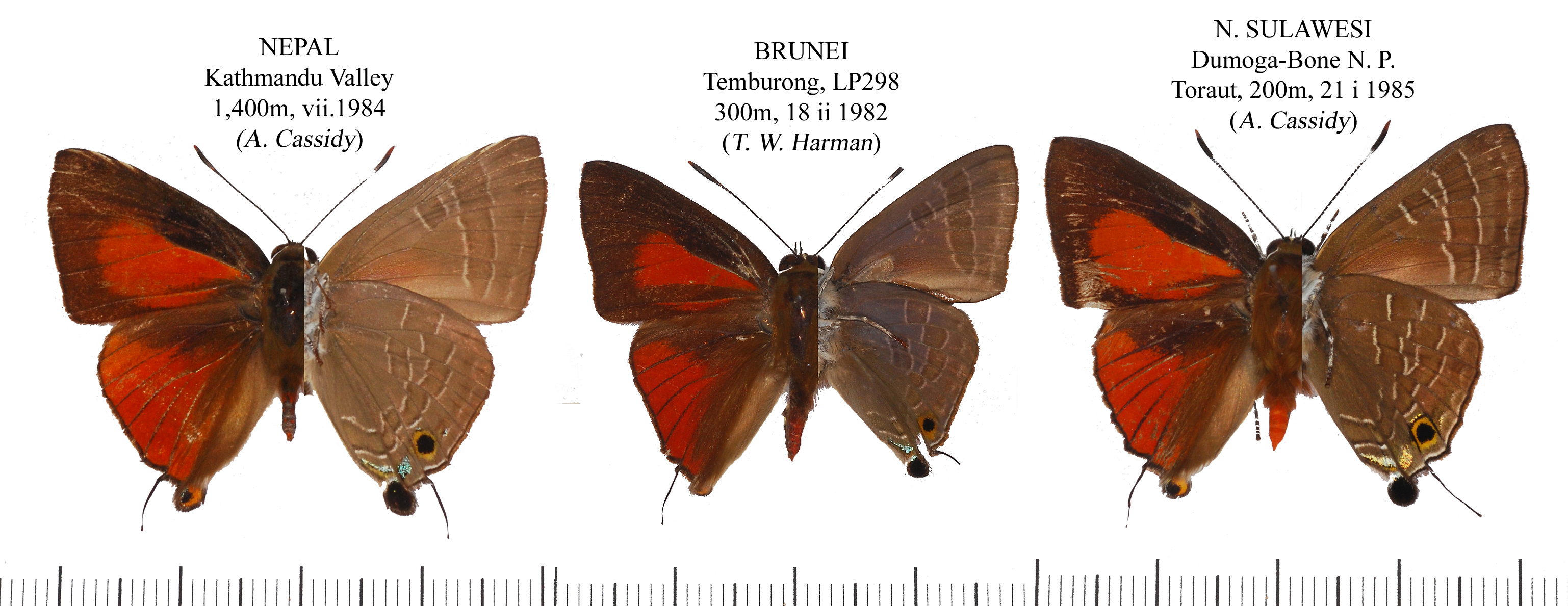
Specimens

== See also ==
- List of butterflies of India (Lycaenidae)
