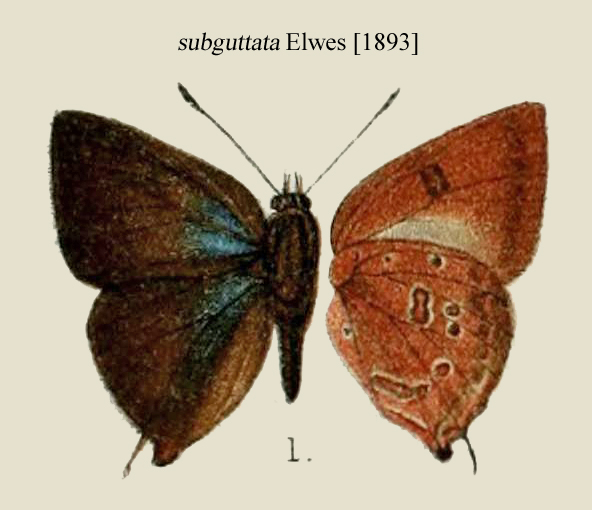

Scientific classification
- Domain: Eukaryota
- Kingdom: Animalia
- Phylum: Arthropoda
- Class: Insecta
- Order: Lepidoptera
- Family: Lycaenidae
- Genus: Deudorix
- Species: D. subguttata

Binomial name
- Deudorix subguttata (Elwes, [1893])

Synonyms
- Rapala subguttata Elwes, [1893]; Virachola malaya Pendlebury & Corbet, 1933

= Deudorix subguttata =

Species of butterfly

Deudorix subguttata is a butterfly in the family Lycaenidae. It was described by Henry John Elwes in 1893. It is found in the Indomalayan realm.

== Subspecies ==
- Deudorix subguttata subguttata (Burma)
- Deudorix subguttata malaya (Pendlebury & Corbet, 1933) (Peninsular Malaysia, Singapore, possibly Sumatra)
