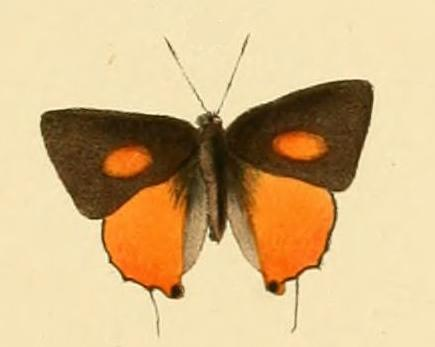

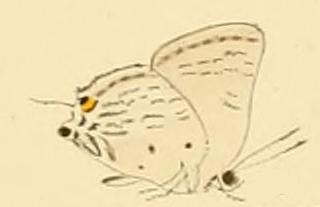

Scientific classification
- Kingdom: Animalia
- Phylum: Arthropoda
- Clade: Pancrustacea
- Class: Insecta
- Order: Lepidoptera
- Family: Lycaenidae
- Genus: Deudorix
- Species: D. wardii

Binomial name
- Deudorix wardii (Mabille, 1878)

Synonyms
- Hypolycaena wardii Mabille, 1878; Deudorix (Virachola) wardii; Thecla rutila Mabille, 1878; Deudorix diopolis Hewitson, 1878; Thecla rutilans Mabille, 1887

= Deudorix wardii =

Species of butterfly

Deudorix wardii is a butterfly in the family Lycaenidae. It is found on Madagascar.
