= Deudorix ufipa =

Scientific classification
- Kingdom: Animalia
- Phylum: Arthropoda
- Clade: Pancrustacea
- Class: Insecta
- Order: Lepidoptera
- Family: Lycaenidae
- Genus: Deudorix
- Species: D. ufipa

Binomial name
- Deudorix ufipa Stempffer, 1948

Synonyms
- Deudorix (Virachola) ufipa

Species of butterfly

Deudorix ufipa is a butterfly in the family Lycaenidae. It is found in western Tanzania and Zambia. The habitat consists of montane areas.

The larvae probably feed on the berries of Rutidea species.
