= Deudorix vansomereni =

Scientific classification
- Kingdom: Animalia
- Phylum: Arthropoda
- Clade: Pancrustacea
- Class: Insecta
- Order: Lepidoptera
- Family: Lycaenidae
- Genus: Deudorix
- Species: D. vansomereni

Binomial name
- Deudorix vansomereni Stempffer, 1951

Synonyms
- Deudorix (Virachola) vansomereni

Species of butterfly

Deudorix vansomereni, the Van Someren's playboy, is a butterfly in the family Lycaenidae. It is found in south-eastern Kenya and north-eastern Tanzania. The habitat consists of forests.

The larvae feed on Acacia species and Agalana obliqua.
