= Deudorix ecaudata =

Untailed playboy

Scientific classification
- Kingdom: Animalia
- Phylum: Arthropoda
- Clade: Pancrustacea
- Class: Insecta
- Order: Lepidoptera
- Family: Lycaenidae
- Genus: Deudorix
- Species: D. ecaudata

Binomial name
- Deudorix ecaudata Gifford, 1963

Synonyms
- Deudorix (Virachola) ecaudata; Deudorix dohertyi Bethune-Baker, 1905

Species of butterfly

Deudorix ecaudata, the untailed playboy, is a butterfly in the family Lycaenidae. It is found in Kenya (east of the Rift Valley), northern Tanzania and Malawi. The habitat consists of thornbush savanna.

The larvae feed on Acacia species and are associated with ants of the genus Pheidole.
