= Deudorix penningtoni =

Pennington's playboy

Scientific classification
- Kingdom: Animalia
- Phylum: Arthropoda
- Clade: Pancrustacea
- Class: Insecta
- Order: Lepidoptera
- Family: Lycaenidae
- Genus: Deudorix
- Species: D. penningtoni

Binomial name
- Deudorix penningtoni van Son, 1949

Synonyms
- Virachola penningtoni

Species of butterfly

Deudorix penningtoni, the Pennington's playboy, is a butterfly of the family Lycaenidae. It is found from northern KwaZulu-Natal and southern Mpumalanga along the Lebombo foothills to the southern part of Limpopo.

The wingspan is 20–23 mm for males and 20–26 mm for females. Adults are on wing year-round with a peak from September to October in most of the range. In Limpopo, there is one main generation with adults on wing from April to June.

The larvae feed on Acacia afra and Acacia burkei, causing stem galls on the twigs.
