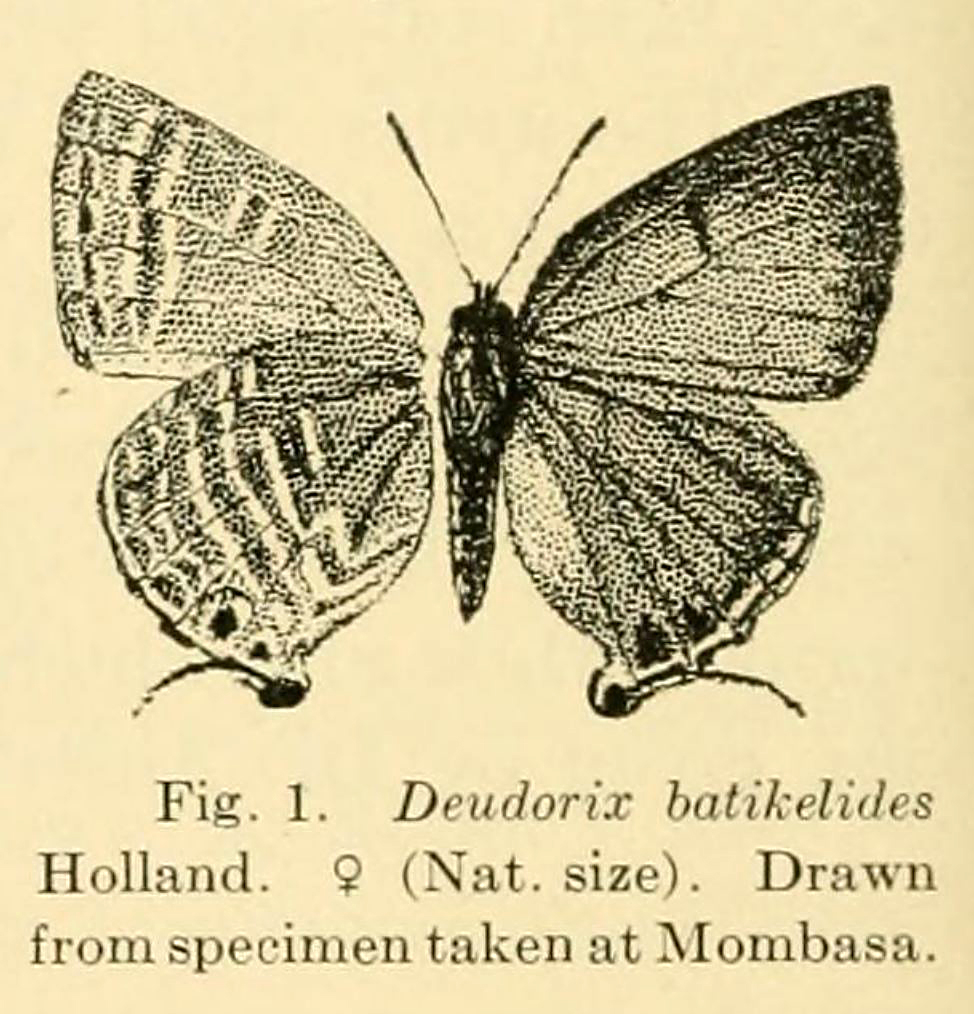

Scientific classification
- Kingdom: Animalia
- Phylum: Arthropoda
- Clade: Pancrustacea
- Class: Insecta
- Order: Lepidoptera
- Family: Lycaenidae
- Genus: Deudorix
- Species: D. batikelides

Binomial name
- Deudorix batikelides Holland, 1920

Synonyms
- Deudorix (Virachola) batikelides

= Deudorix batikelides =

Species of butterfly

Deudorix batikelides is a butterfly in the family Lycaenidae. It is found in the Democratic Republic of the Congo (Uele and Niangara).
