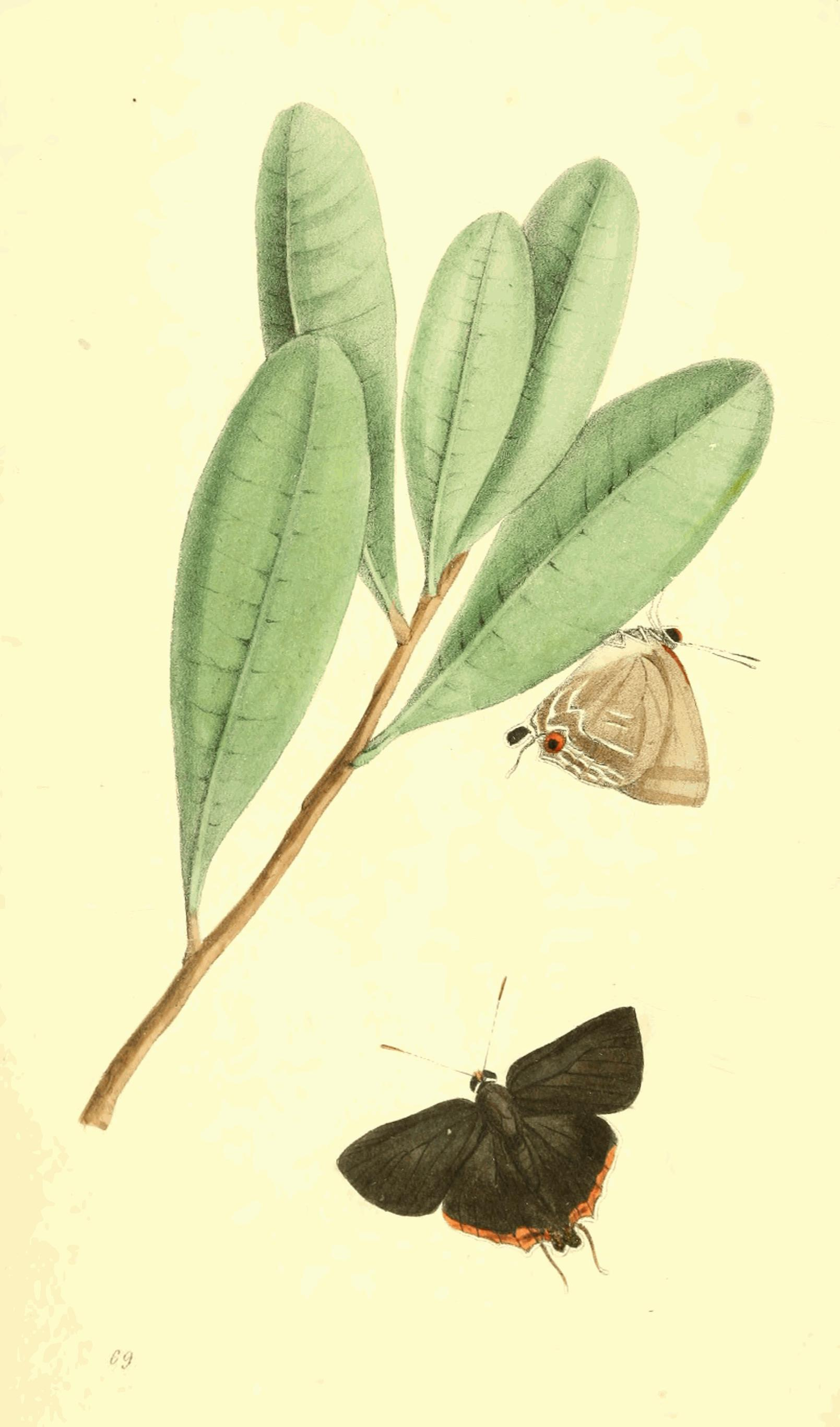

Scientific classification
- Kingdom: Animalia
- Phylum: Arthropoda
- Clade: Pancrustacea
- Class: Insecta
- Order: Lepidoptera
- Family: Lycaenidae
- Genus: Deudorix
- Species: D. galathea

Binomial name
- Deudorix galathea (Swainson, 1821)

Synonyms
- Thecla galathea Swainson, 1821; Deudorix (Virachola) galathea

= Deudorix galathea =

Red-edged playboy

Species of butterfly

Deudorix galathea, the red-edged playboy, is a butterfly in the family Lycaenidae. It is found in Senegal, Guinea, Sierra Leone, Liberia, Ivory Coast, Ghana, Nigeria (south and the Cross River loop), Cameroon and Gabon.
