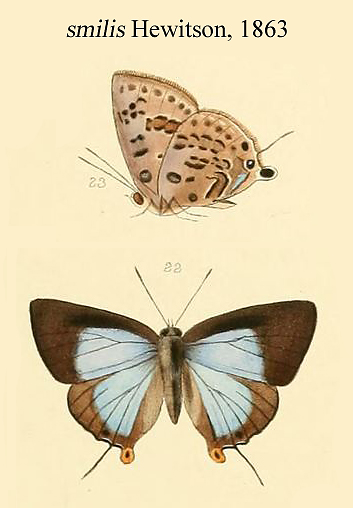

Scientific classification
- Kingdom: Animalia
- Phylum: Arthropoda
- Clade: Pancrustacea
- Class: Insecta
- Order: Lepidoptera
- Family: Lycaenidae
- Genus: Deudorix
- Species: D. smilis

Binomial name
- Deudorix smilis (Hewitson, 1863)

Synonyms
- Deudorix perse silo Fruhstorfer, 1912; Deudorix perse vocetius Fruhstorfer, 1912; Virachola smilis nicevillei Tytler, 1926; Virachola smilis sylvia D'Abrera, 1971; Virachola smilis dalyensis Le Souff & Tindale, 1970

= Deudorix smilis =

Species of butterfly

Deudorix smilis is a butterfly in the family Lycaenidae. It was described by William Chapman Hewitson in 1863. It is found in the Indomalayan realm.

The larvae feed on Strychnos lucida.

== Subspecies ==
- Deudorix smilis smilis (Assam, Burma, Peninsular Malaysia, possibly Thailand, Andamans, possibly Sumatra)
- Deudorix smilis silo Fruhstorfer, 1912 (Borneo)
- Deudorix smilis vocetius Fruhstorfer, 1912 (Palawan)
- Deudorix smilis nicevillei (Tytler, 1926) (Andaman Island)
- Deudorix smilis sylvia (D'Abrera, 1971) (Obi, Bachan)
- Deudorix smilis dalyensis (Le Souff & Tindale, 1970) (Australia: Daly River Crossing)
