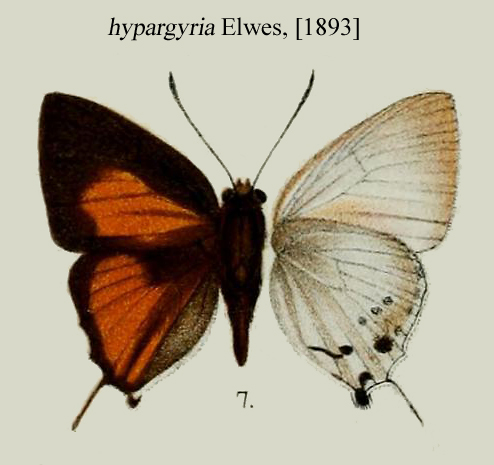

Scientific classification
- Kingdom: Animalia
- Phylum: Arthropoda
- Class: Insecta
- Order: Lepidoptera
- Family: Lycaenidae
- Genus: Deudorix
- Species: D. hypargyria

Binomial name
- Deudorix hypargyria (Elwes, [1893])

Synonyms
- Rapala hypargyria Elwes, [1893]

= Deudorix hypargyria =

Scarce cornelian

Species of butterfly

Deudorix hypargyria, the scarce cornelian, is a species of butterfly belonging to the lycaenid family described by Henry John Elwes in 1893. It is found in the Indomalayan realm (Burma to Sundaland and the Philippines).

== Subspecies ==
- Deudorix hypargyria hypargyria (Burma to Sundaland)
- Deudorix hypargyria annawarneckae Schröder & Treadaway, 2013 (Philippines)
