= Deudorix suk =

Scientific classification
- Kingdom: Animalia
- Phylum: Arthropoda
- Clade: Pancrustacea
- Class: Insecta
- Order: Lepidoptera
- Family: Lycaenidae
- Genus: Deudorix
- Species: D. suk

Binomial name
- Deudorix suk Stempffer, 1948

Synonyms
- Deudorix (Virachola) suk

Species of butterfly

Deudorix suk, the Suk playboy, is a butterfly in the family Lycaenidae. It is found in eastern Uganda and western and central Kenya.

The larvae feed on Acacia species. They feed within galls. The larvae are associated with ants of the genus Pheidole.
