= Deudorix magda =

Scientific classification
- Kingdom: Animalia
- Phylum: Arthropoda
- Clade: Pancrustacea
- Class: Insecta
- Order: Lepidoptera
- Family: Lycaenidae
- Genus: Deudorix
- Species: D. magda

Binomial name
- Deudorix magda Gifford, 1963

Synonyms
- Deudorix (Virachola) magda

Species of butterfly

Deudorix magda, the dusky playboy, is a butterfly in the family Lycaenidae. It is found in Malawi, Zambia and northern and eastern Zimbabwe. The habitat consists of Brachystegia-Uapaca woodland.

Adults are attracted to flowers, including Mesembryanthemum.

The larvae feed on Uapaca kirkiana.
