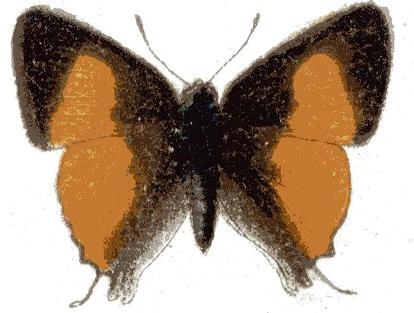

Scientific classification
- Kingdom: Animalia
- Phylum: Arthropoda
- Clade: Pancrustacea
- Class: Insecta
- Order: Lepidoptera
- Family: Lycaenidae
- Genus: Deudorix
- Species: D. batikeli

Binomial name
- Deudorix batikeli (Boisduval, 1833)

Synonyms
- Lycaena batikeli Boisduval, 1833; Deudorix (Virachola) batikeli; Lycaena tsiphana Boisduval, 1833; Thecla licinia Mabille, 1878; Deudorix derona Grose-Smith, 1891

= Deudorix batikeli =

Species of butterfly

Deudorix batikeli is a butterfly in the family Lycaenidae. It is found on Madagascar. The habitat consists of forests.
