= Deudorix jacksoni =

Scientific classification
- Kingdom: Animalia
- Phylum: Arthropoda
- Clade: Pancrustacea
- Class: Insecta
- Order: Lepidoptera
- Family: Lycaenidae
- Genus: Deudorix
- Species: D. jacksoni

Binomial name
- Deudorix jacksoni Talbot, 1935

Synonyms
- Deudorix (Virachola) jacksoni

Species of butterfly

Deudorix jacksoni, the Jackson's playboy, is a butterfly in the family Lycaenidae. It is found in south-western Uganda, western Kenya, Tanzania (from the north-eastern part of the country to the Usambara Mountains) and north-western Zambia. The habitat consists of the ecotone between forests and savanna, especially riverine vegetation.

The larvae feed on the young leaves of Loranthus usuiensis, Albizia gummifera, Phragmanthera usuiensis and Erianthemum dregei. They are dark rich brown.
