= Deudorix badhami =

Scientific classification
- Kingdom: Animalia
- Phylum: Arthropoda
- Clade: Pancrustacea
- Class: Insecta
- Order: Lepidoptera
- Family: Lycaenidae
- Genus: Deudorix
- Species: D. badhami

Binomial name
- Deudorix badhami Carcasson, 1961

Synonyms
- Deudorix (Virachola) badhami Carcasson, 1961

Species of butterfly

Deudorix badhami is a butterfly in the family Lycaenidae. It is found in the Democratic Republic of the Congo (from the south-eastern part of the country to Lualaba) and Zambia.
