= Charaxes lucretius =

- male C. l. lucretius Bobiri Forest, Ghana

Scientific classification
- Kingdom: Animalia
- Phylum: Arthropoda
- Clade: Pancrustacea
- Class: Insecta
- Order: Lepidoptera
- Family: Nymphalidae
- Genus: Charaxes
- Species: C. lucretius

Binomial name
- Charaxes lucretius (Cramer, [1775])

Synonyms
- Papilio lucretius Cramer, [1775]; Charaxes lucretius lucida Le Cerf, 1923; Charaxes lucretius f. caliginosa Le Cerf, 1923; Charaxes cynthia f. albofascia Le Cerf, 1923; Charaxes lucretius f. babingtoni Stoneham, 1943; Charaxes lucretius f. alberici Dufrane, 1945; Charaxes lucretius f. victoriaeincola Storace, 1948

Species of butterfly

Charaxes lucretius, the violet-washed charaxes or common red charaxes, is a butterfly in the family Nymphalidae.

== Description ==
Ch. lucretius Cr. male. Wings above black with slight bluish reflection; forewing rust-brown in the cell and at the costal margin, beyond the middle with a nearly straight row of 8 large red-yellow spots and with similar but smaller marginal spots; hindwing beyond the middle with red-yellow, posteriorly narrower discal band and with broad red-yellow marginal band; the under surface red-brown with black transverse streaks in the basal part. In the female both wings above are smoke-brown with common whitish discal band, placed as in the male but much narrower; the marginal spots of the forewing very small or indistinct; the marginal band of the hindwing much narrower than in the male and whitish with orange-yellow tinge; the base of the costal margin of the forewing only very narrowly red-brown; the under surface lighter than in the male and with whitish discal band, which is broader than above. In the West African forest-region from Sierra Leone to Angola and Uganda, widely distributed and very common. Similar to Charaxes eudoxus but the silvery markings on the underside are absent

== Taxonomy ==
Charaxes lucretius group:

- Charaxes lucretius
- Charaxes octavus
- Charaxes odysseus
- Charaxes lemosi

== Subspecies ==
- C. l. lucretius (Senegal, Guinea, Sierra Leone, Liberia, Ivory Coast, Ghana, Togo, western Nigeria)
- C. l. intermedius van Someren, 1971 (Nigeria, Cameroon, Gabon, Congo, Central African Republic, Democratic Republic of the Congo, Zambia)
- C. l. maximus van Someren, 1971 (Democratic Republic of the Congo, Uganda, Rwanda, Burundi, western Kenya, north-western Tanzania)
- C. l. saldanhai Bivar de Sousa, 1983 (north-western Angola)
- C. l. schofieldi Plantrou, 1989 (north-eastern Zambia)

Torben Larsen developed a species numbering system for his 2005 publication Butterflies of West Africa. The nominate subspecies is #732. The 'Larsen' numbers have since been used with permission in A Sharp Eye on Butterflies of Ghana.

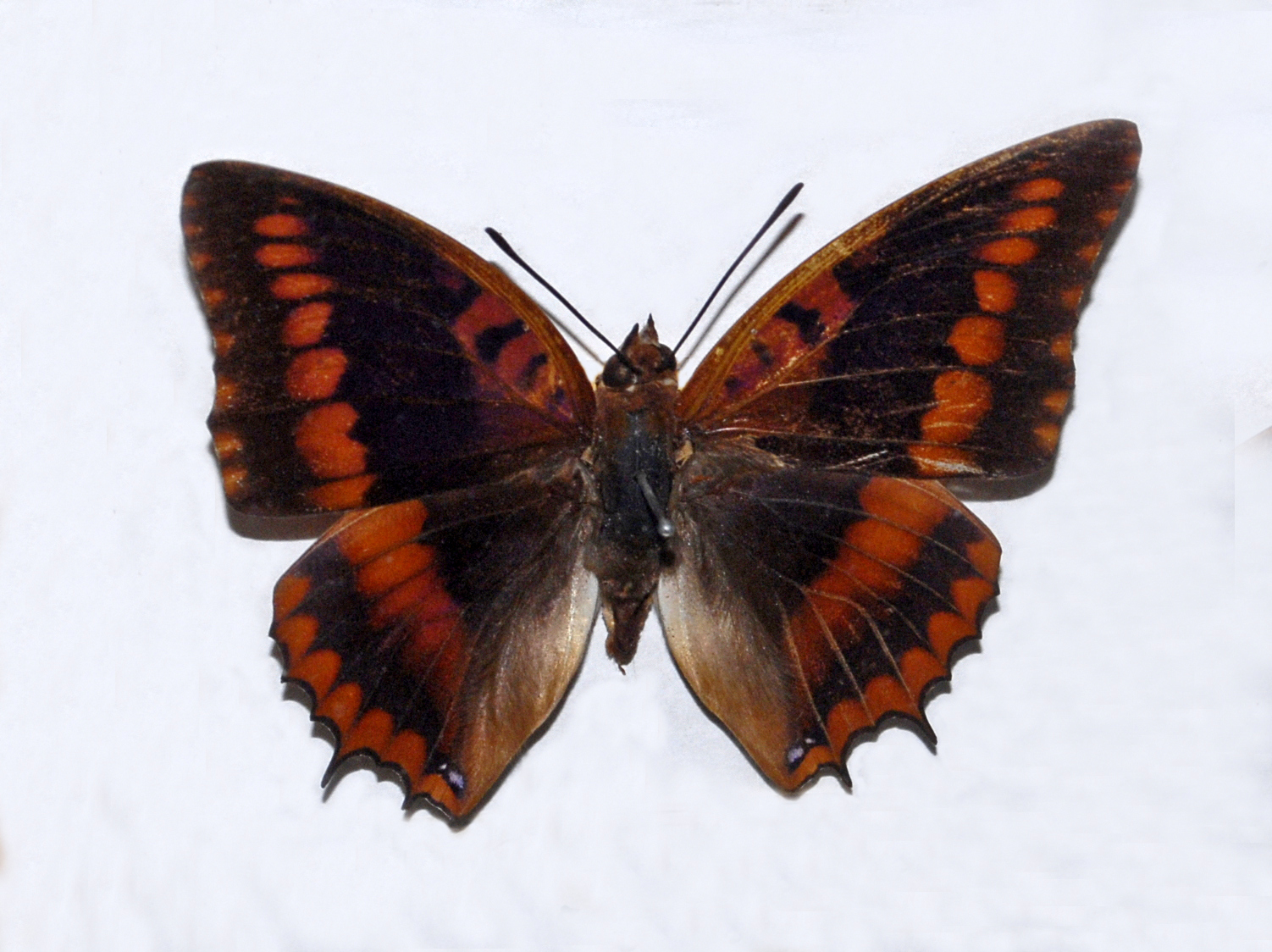
C. l. intermedius - male

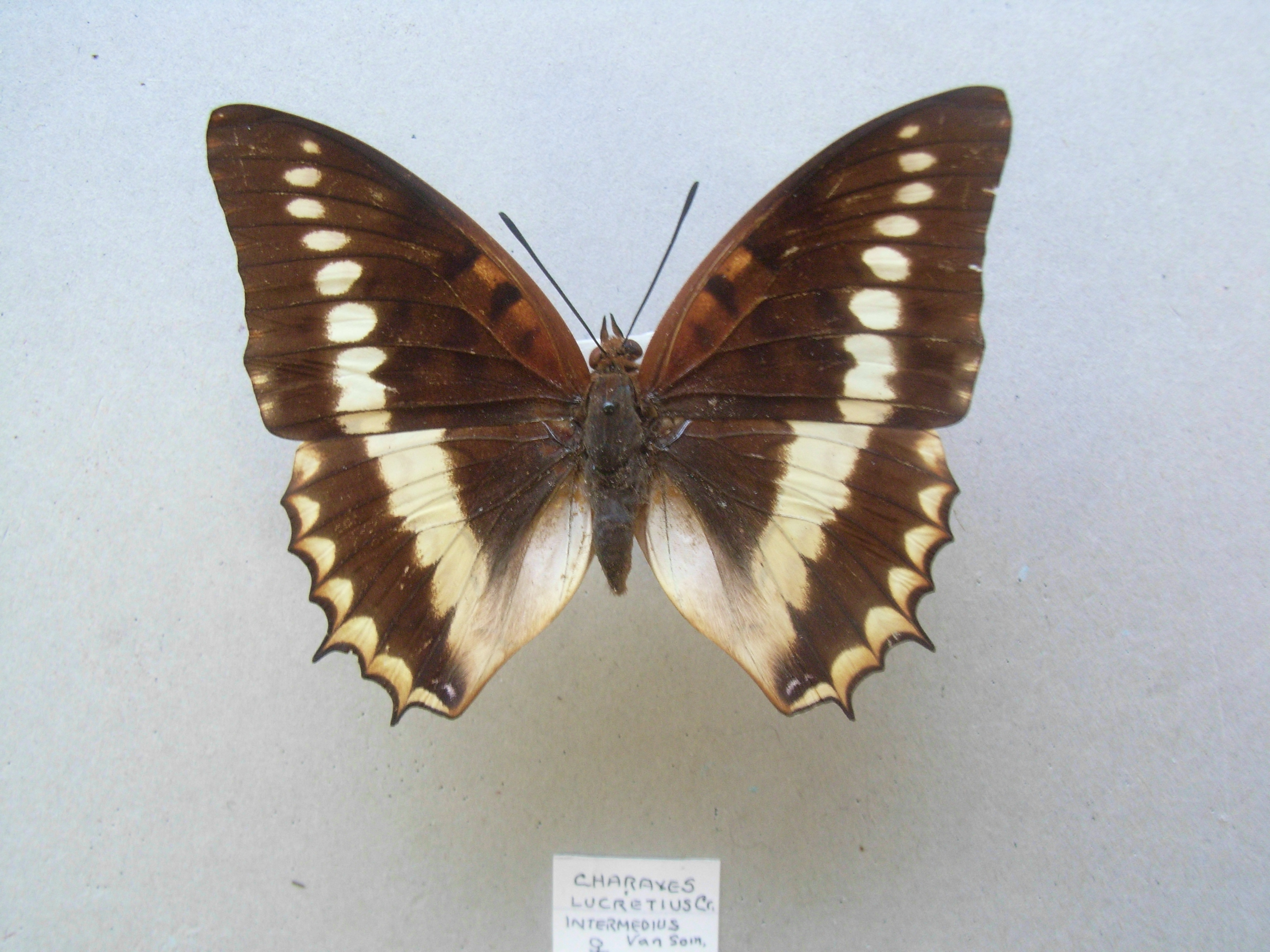
C. l. intermedius - female

== Distribution and habitat ==
It is found in Senegal, Guinea, Sierra Leone, Liberia, Ivory Coast, Ghana, Togo, Nigeria, Cameroon, Equatorial Guinea, Sao Tome and Principe, Gabon, the Republic of the Congo, Angola, the Central African Republic, the Democratic Republic of the Congo, Uganda, Rwanda, Burundi, Kenya, Tanzania and Zambia. The habitat consists of primary forests.

== Biology ==
Notes on the biology of lucretius are provided by Larsen (2005) and Larsen (1991)

The larvae feed on Annona senegalensis, Hugonia platysepala and Trema species.
