= Deudorix mpanda =

Scientific classification
- Kingdom: Animalia
- Phylum: Arthropoda
- Clade: Pancrustacea
- Class: Insecta
- Order: Lepidoptera
- Family: Lycaenidae
- Genus: Deudorix
- Species: D. mpanda

Binomial name
- Deudorix mpanda (Kielland, 1990)

Synonyms
- Virachola mpanda Kielland, 1990; Deudorix (Virachola) mpanda

Species of butterfly

Deudorix mpanda is a species of butterfly in the family Lycaenidae, described by Jan Kielland (1923–1995), a Norwegian lepidopterist who spent much of his life in Tanzania, in 1990. It is found in Tanzania (from the western part of the country to Mpanda District).

Its preferred habitat is montane, typically areas at altitudes between 1,400 and 1,700m, where it inhabits forest margins and scattered stunted woodland rather than dense forest interiors.
