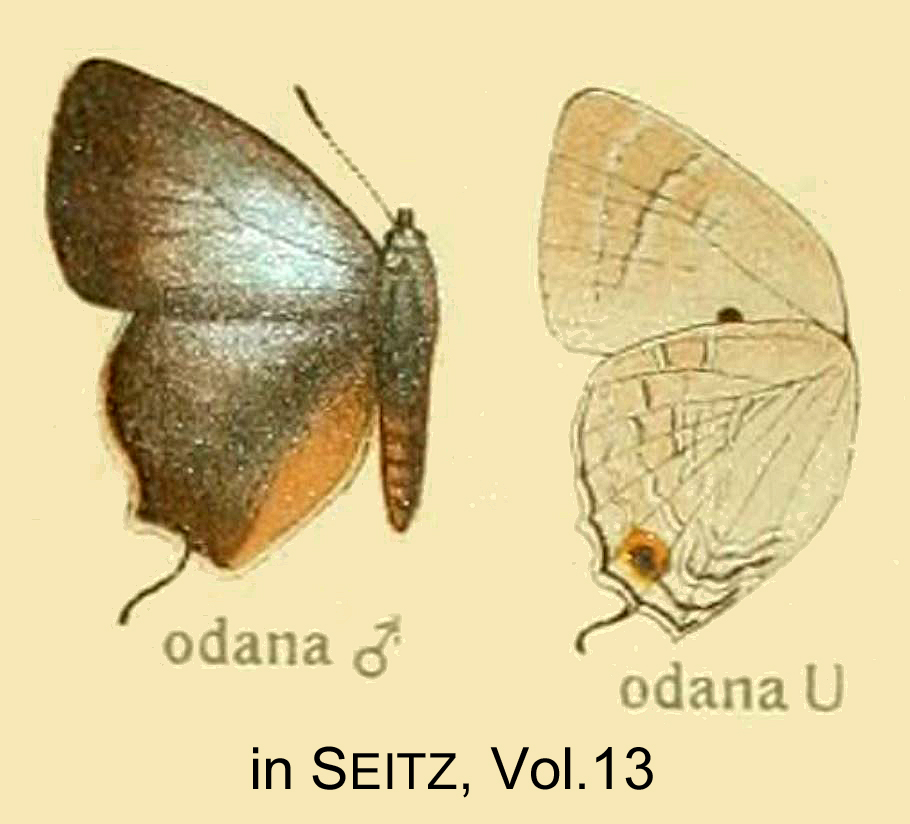

Scientific classification
- Kingdom: Animalia
- Phylum: Arthropoda
- Clade: Pancrustacea
- Class: Insecta
- Order: Lepidoptera
- Family: Lycaenidae
- Genus: Deudorix
- Species: D. odana

Binomial name
- Deudorix odana H. H. Druce, 1887

Synonyms
- Deudorix (Virachola) odana

= Deudorix odana =

Species of butterfly

Deudorix odana, the indigo playboy, is a butterfly in the family Lycaenidae. The species was first described by Hamilton Herbert Druce in 1887. It is found in Senegal, Guinea, Sierra Leone, Ivory Coast, Ghana, Nigeria (south and the Cross River loop), Cameroon, the Republic of the Congo, the Central African Republic, the Democratic Republic of the Congo (Uele, Tshopo, Sankuru and Lualaba), Uganda, western Kenya and north-western Tanzania. The habitat consists of forests.

Adults feed from flowers and both sexes mud-puddle.

The larvae feed on Canavalia ensiformis and Caesalpinia species. They feed on the seeds of their host plant within the pods.

Torben Larsen developed a species numbering system for his 2005 publication Butterflies of West Africa. This species is #500. The 'Larsen' numbers have since been used with permission in A Sharp Eye on Butterflies of Ghana.
