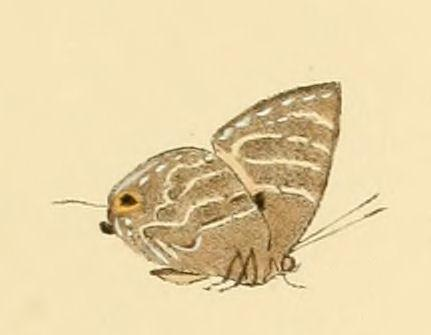

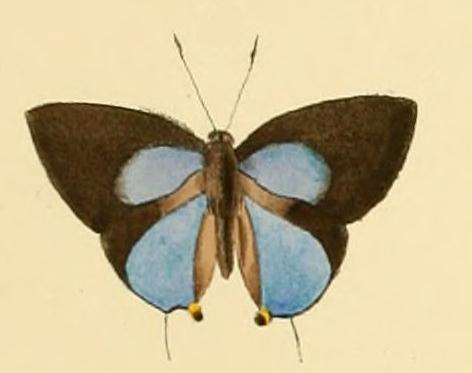

Scientific classification
- Kingdom: Animalia
- Phylum: Arthropoda
- Clade: Pancrustacea
- Class: Insecta
- Order: Lepidoptera
- Family: Lycaenidae
- Genus: Deudorix
- Species: D. kessuma

Binomial name
- Deudorix kessuma (Horsfield, [1829])

Synonyms
- Thecla kessuma Horsfield, [1829]; Virachola kessuma; Deudorix deliochus Hewitson, 1874; Rapala kessuma clearchus Fruhstorfer, 1912; Rapala kessuma throana Fruhstorfer, 1914

= Deudorix kessuma =

Species of butterfly

Deudorix kessuma is a butterfly in the family Lycaenidae. It is found in south-east Asia. Larvae feed on Nepenthes species, the first three instars bore into the seed pods.

== Subspecies ==
- Deudorix kessuma kessuma (Java)
- Deudorix kessuma deliochus Hewitson, 1874 (Burma to Singapore and possibly Indochina)
- Deudorix kessuma clearchus (Fruhstorfer, 1912) (Sumbawa, Lombok)
- Deudorix kessuma throana (Fruhstorfer, 1914) (Borneo and possibly Sumatra)
