= Deudorix vansoni =

Van Son's playboy

Scientific classification
- Kingdom: Animalia
- Phylum: Arthropoda
- Clade: Pancrustacea
- Class: Insecta
- Order: Lepidoptera
- Family: Lycaenidae
- Genus: Deudorix
- Species: D. vansoni

Binomial name
- Deudorix vansoni Pennington, 1948

Synonyms
- Virachola vansoni

Species of butterfly

Deudorix vansoni, the Van Son's playboy, is a butterfly of the family Lycaenidae. It is found from northern KwaZulu-Natal to Eswatini, then along the Lebombo foothills to southern Mpumalanga and north to Zimbabwe and Malawi.

The wingspan is 20–23 mm for males and 20–26 mm for females. Adults are on wing year-round with a peak from September to October.

The larvae feed on Acacia afra and Acacia burkei, causing stem galls on the twigs.
