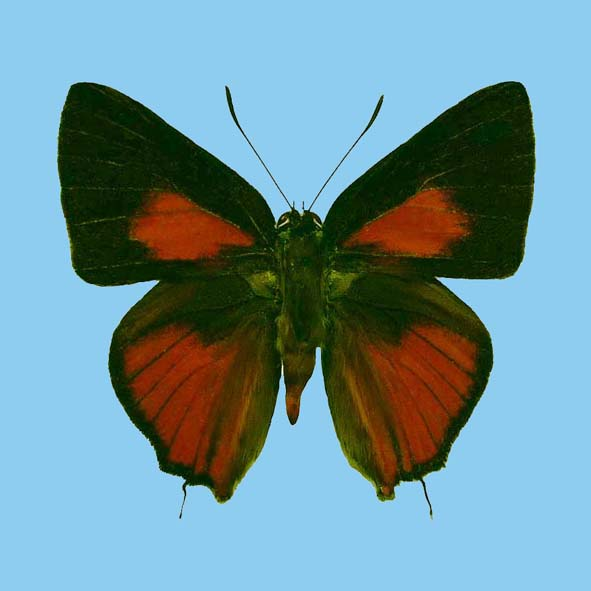
- Male upperside
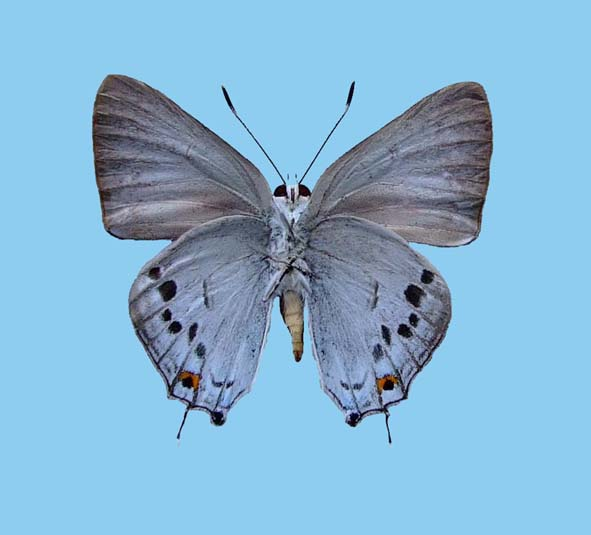
- Male underside

Scientific classification
- Kingdom: Animalia
- Phylum: Arthropoda
- Clade: Pancrustacea
- Class: Insecta
- Order: Lepidoptera
- Family: Lycaenidae
- Genus: Deudorix
- Species: D. philippinensis

Binomial name
- Deudorix philippinensis Schrőder, Treadaway & H. Hayashi, 1981

= Deudorix philippinensis =

Species of butterfly

Deudorix philippinensis is a butterfly of the family Lycaenidae first described by Heinz G. Schroeder, Colin G. Treadaway and Hisakazu Hayashi in 1981. It is endemic to the Philippines where it is found on the islands of Luzon, Marinduque, Masbate, Mindoro, Panay, Negros, Sibuyan and Mindanao.

Its forewing length is 18–25 mm. The female has two forms, with orange or dark brown on the upperside.

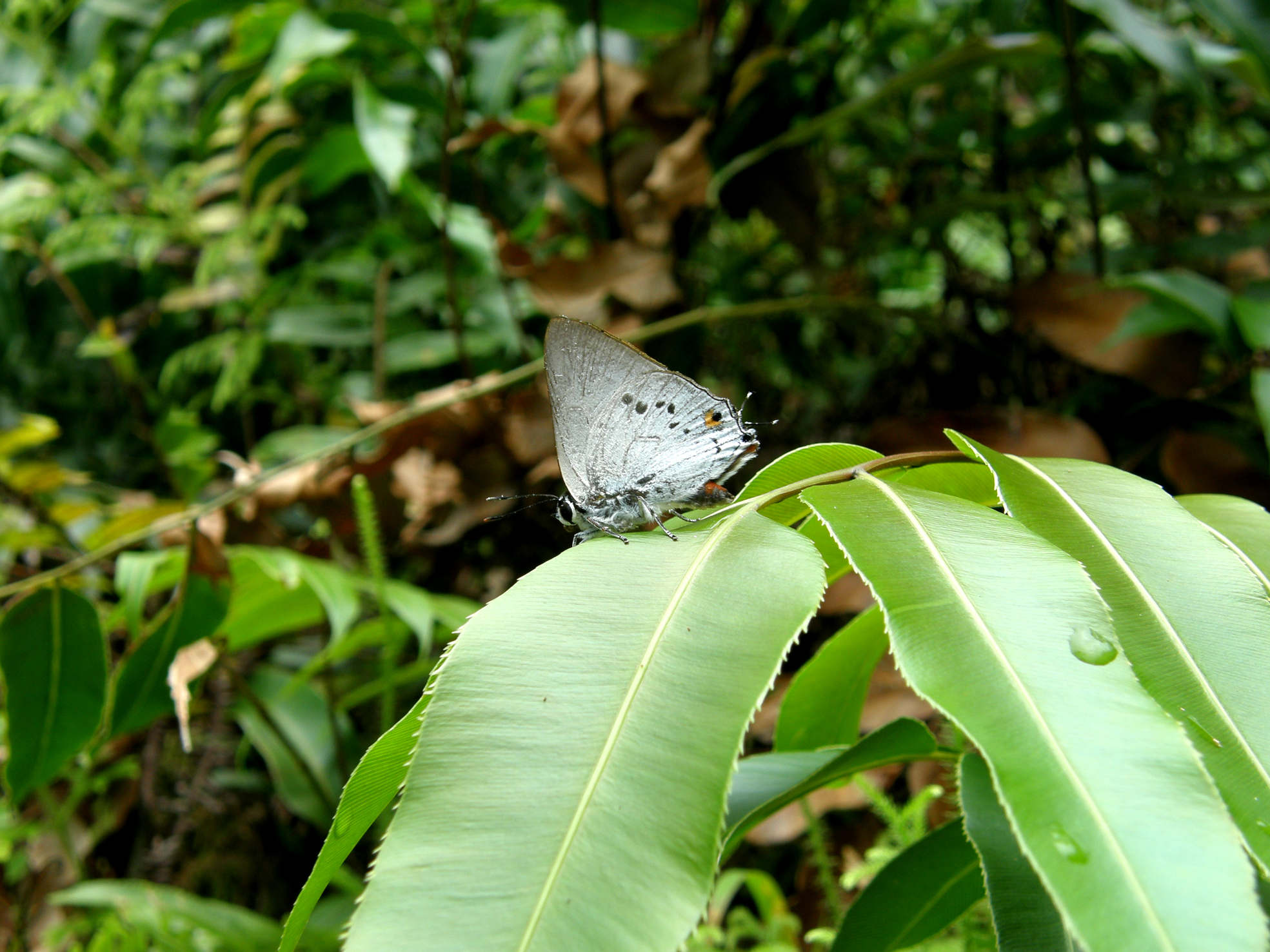
Male, Mount Apo, Mindanao

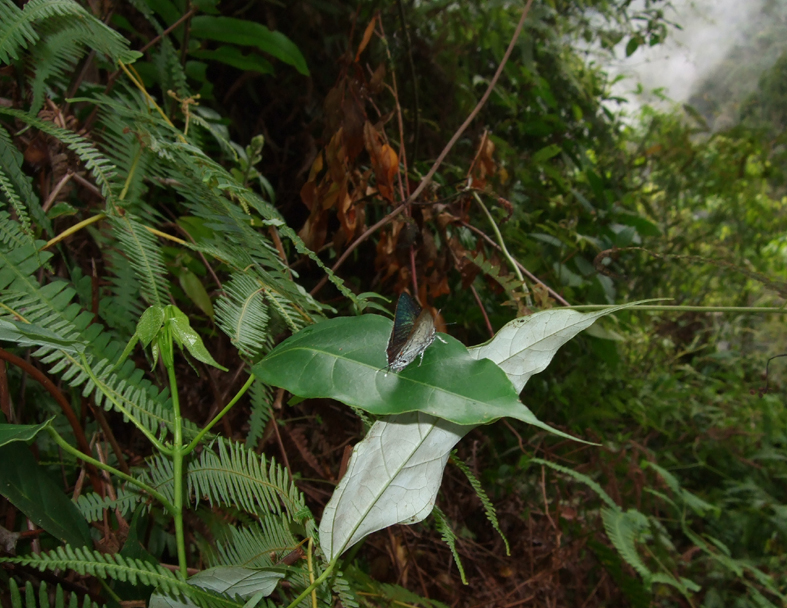
Female (form B), Mount Apo
