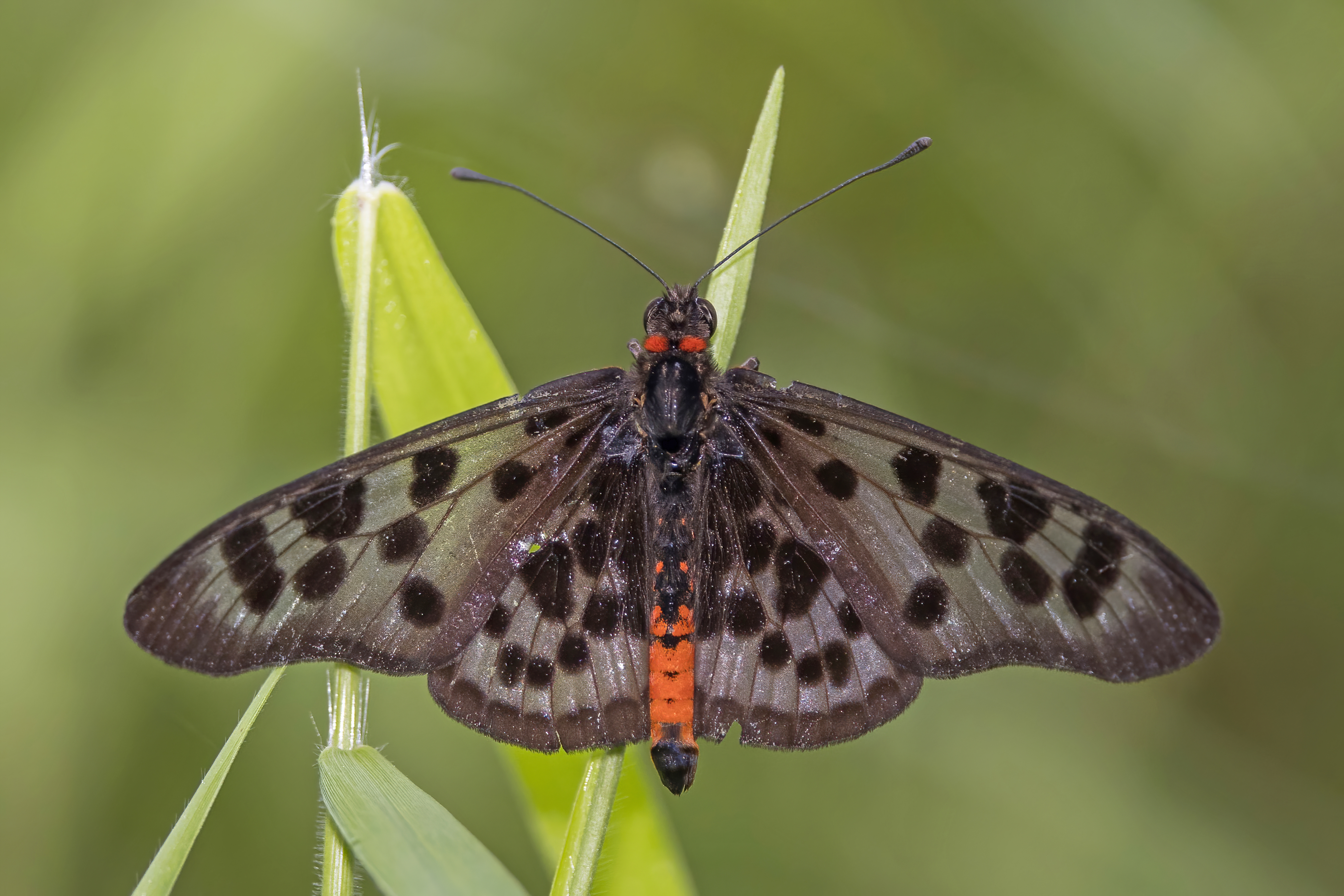
- male, São Tomé island São Tomé and Príncipe

Scientific classification
- Kingdom: Animalia
- Phylum: Arthropoda
- Class: Insecta
- Order: Lepidoptera
- Family: Nymphalidae
- Genus: Acraea
- Species: A. niobe

Binomial name
- Acraea niobe Sharpe, 1893

Synonyms
- Acraea (Acraea) niobe

= Acraea niobe =

Species of butterfly

Acraea niobe is a butterfly in the family Nymphalidae. It is found on the island of São Tomé. The species was first described by Emily Mary Bowdler Sharpe in 1893. The specific name of the species refers to the Greek myth of Niobe.

== Description ==
A. niobe E. Sharpe is an interesting species, unfortunately, however, only known to me [Aurivillius] through the description and figure. Eltringham considers its affinities quite uncertain; it seems to me to be most nearly allied to egina and medea. Only the male is yet known [1925]. This has the ground-colour of both wings black-grey, darker at the margins and semi-transparent in the middle; hindwing above with black marginal band 2 mm. in breadth; the black dots of the forewing are large and arranged as in egina except that those in cellules 4 to 6 are placed much nearer to the apex, so that discal dots 2 to 4 stand in a straight line, as in chilo; the basal and discal dots of the hindwing are also very large and those in cellules 1 b to 5 stand in an almost straight line directed towards the apex; the formation of the marginal band of the hindwing beneath is not mentioned in the description, but it seems to be without spots there also. Collar and posterior half of the abdomen red. Island of Sao Thome.

== Taxonomy ==
It is a member of the Acraea jodutta species group - but see also Pierre & Bernaud, 2014
