= Deudorix montana =

Scientific classification
- Kingdom: Animalia
- Phylum: Arthropoda
- Clade: Pancrustacea
- Class: Insecta
- Order: Lepidoptera
- Family: Lycaenidae
- Genus: Deudorix
- Species: D. montana

Binomial name
- Deudorix montana (Kielland, 1985)

Synonyms
- Virachola montana Kielland, 1985; Deudorix (Virachola) montana

Species of butterfly

Deudorix montana is a butterfly in the family Lycaenidae. It is found in Tanzania (the Nyumbenito Mountain and Lugoda in Mufindi) and Malawi.

Adults are on wing in March and April.

The larvae feed on Rutidea fuscescens.
