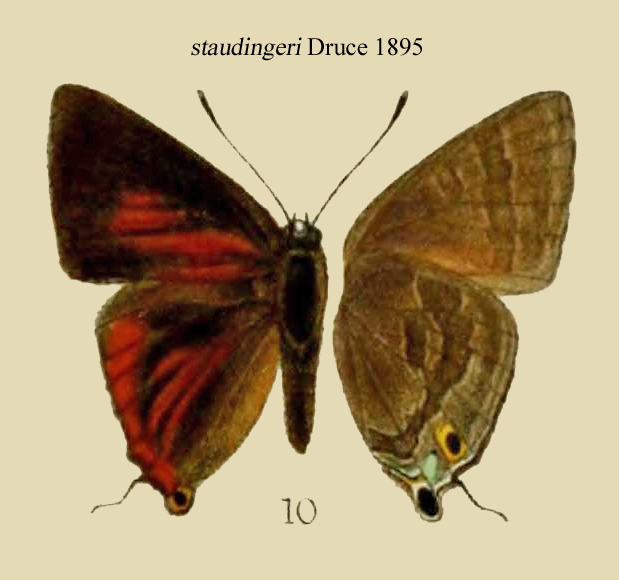

Scientific classification
- Kingdom: Animalia
- Phylum: Arthropoda
- Clade: Pancrustacea
- Class: Insecta
- Order: Lepidoptera
- Family: Lycaenidae
- Genus: Deudorix
- Species: D. staudingeri

Binomial name
- Deudorix staudingeri H. H. Druce, 1895

Synonyms
- Deudorix calderon Kheil, 1884

= Deudorix staudingeri =

Large cornelian

Species of butterfly

Deudorix staudingeri, the large cornelian, is a species of butterfly belonging to the lycaenid family described by Hamilton Herbert Druce in 1895. It is found in the Indomalayan realm, where it has been recorded from Nias, Sumatra, Borneo, Peninsular Malaysia and Singapore. The name honours Otto Staudinger.
