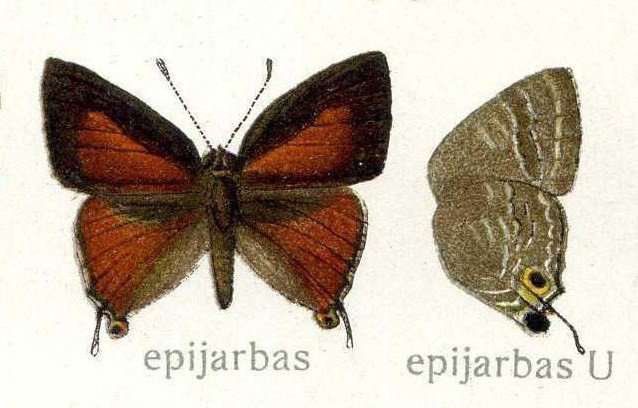
- Deudorix epijarbas

Scientific classification
- Kingdom: Animalia
- Phylum: Arthropoda
- Class: Insecta
- Order: Lepidoptera
- Family: Lycaenidae
- Subfamily: Theclinae
- Tribe: Deudorigini
- Genus: Deudorix; Hewitson, [1863]

Synonyms
- Virachola Moore, [1881]

= Deudorix =

Butterfly genus in family Lycaenidae

Deudorix is a large genus of butterflies in the family Lycaenidae. The species of this genus are found in the Old World and Australia.

== Species ==
- Deudorix affinis (Rothschild, 1915)
- Deudorix antalus (Hopffer, 1855)
- Deudorix apayao Schröder & Treadaway, 1983
- Deudorix badhami Carcasson, 1961
- Deudorix batikeli (Boisduval, 1833)
- Deudorix batikelides Holland, 1920
- Deudorix caliginosa Lathy, 1903
- Deudorix ceramensis Ribbe, 1901
- Deudorix chalybeata Joicey & Talbot, 1926
- Deudorix dariaves Hewitson, 1877
- Deudorix democles Miskin, 1884
- Deudorix diara Swinhoe, 1896
- Deudorix dinochares Grose-Smith, 1887
- Deudorix dinomenes Grose-Smith, 1887
- Deudorix diocles Hewitson, 1869
- Deudorix diovis Hewitson, [1863]
- Deudorix dohertyi Tytler, 1915
- Deudorix ecaudata Gifford, 1963
- Deudorix edwardsi Gabriel, 1939
- Deudorix elioti Corbet, 1940
- Deudorix epijarbas (Moore, [1858])
- Deudorix epirus (C. & R. Felder, 1860)
- Deudorix gaetulia de Nicéville, [1893]
- Deudorix galathea (Swainson, 1821)
- Deudorix hainana Chou & Gu, 1994
- Deudorix hypargyria (Elwes, [1893])
- Deudorix isocrates (Fabricius, 1793)
- Deudorix jacksoni Talbot, 1935
- Deudorix kayonza Stempffer, 1956
- Deudorix kessuma (Horsfield, [1829])
- Deudorix kuyoniana Matsumura, 1912
- Deudorix livia (Klug, 1834)
- Deudorix lorisona (Hewitson, 1863)
- Deudorix loxius Hewitson, [1863]
- Deudorix magda Gifford, 1963
- Deudorix masamichii (Okubo, 1983)
- Deudorix maudei Joicey & Talbot, 1916
- Deudorix montana (Kielland, 1985)
- Deudorix mpanda (Kielland, 1990)
- Deudorix mulleri Tennent, 2000
- Deudorix nicephora Hulstaert, 1924
- Deudorix niepelti Joicey & Talbot, 1922
- Deudorix novellus Yagishita, 2006
- Deudorix odana Druce, 1887
- Deudorix penningtoni van Son, 1949
- Deudorix perse Hewitson, [1863]
- Deudorix philippinensis Schröder, Treadaway & Hayashi, 1981
- Deudorix rapaloides (Naritomi, 1941)
- Deudorix renidens (Mabille, 1884)
- Deudorix sankakuhonis Matsumura, 1938
- Deudorix smilis Hewitson, [1863]
- Deudorix staudingeri Druce, 1895
- Deudorix strephanus Druce, 1896
- Deudorix subguttata (Elwes, [1893])
- Deudorix suk Stempffer, 1948
- Deudorix sumatrensis Fruhstorfer, 1912
- Deudorix ufipa Kielland, 1978
- Deudorix vansomereni Stempffer, 1951
- Deudorix vansoni Pennington, 1948
- Deudorix wardii (Mabille, 1878)
- Deudorix woodfordi Druce, 1891

== Gallery ==
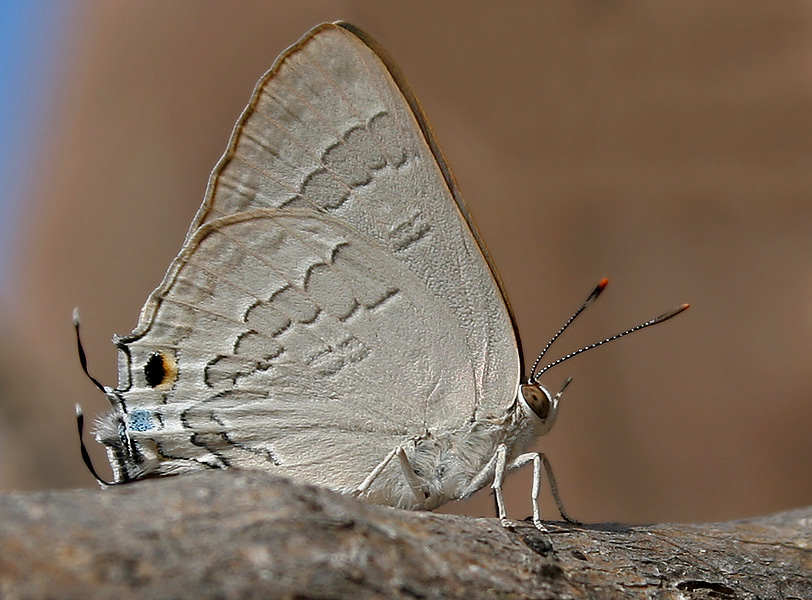
Deudorix isocrates in Bhuvanagiri, Andhra Pradesh, India

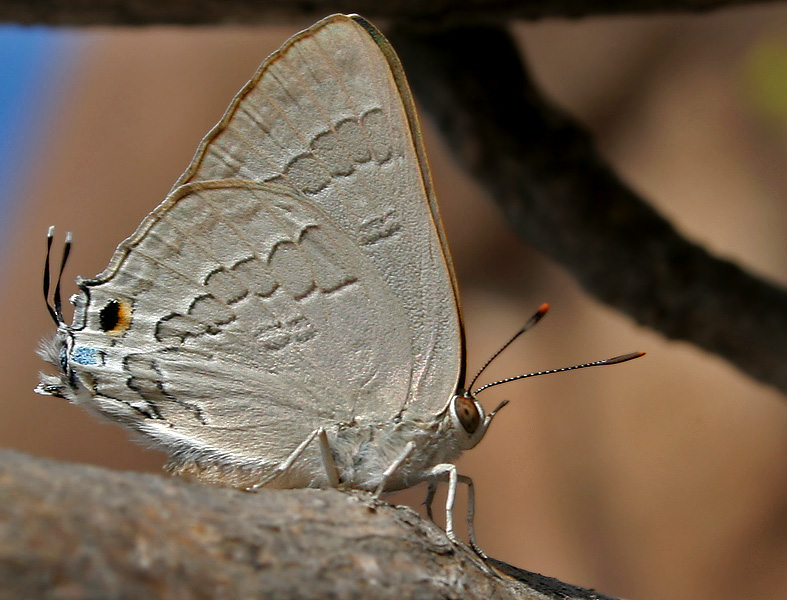
Deudorix isocrates in Bhuvanagiri
