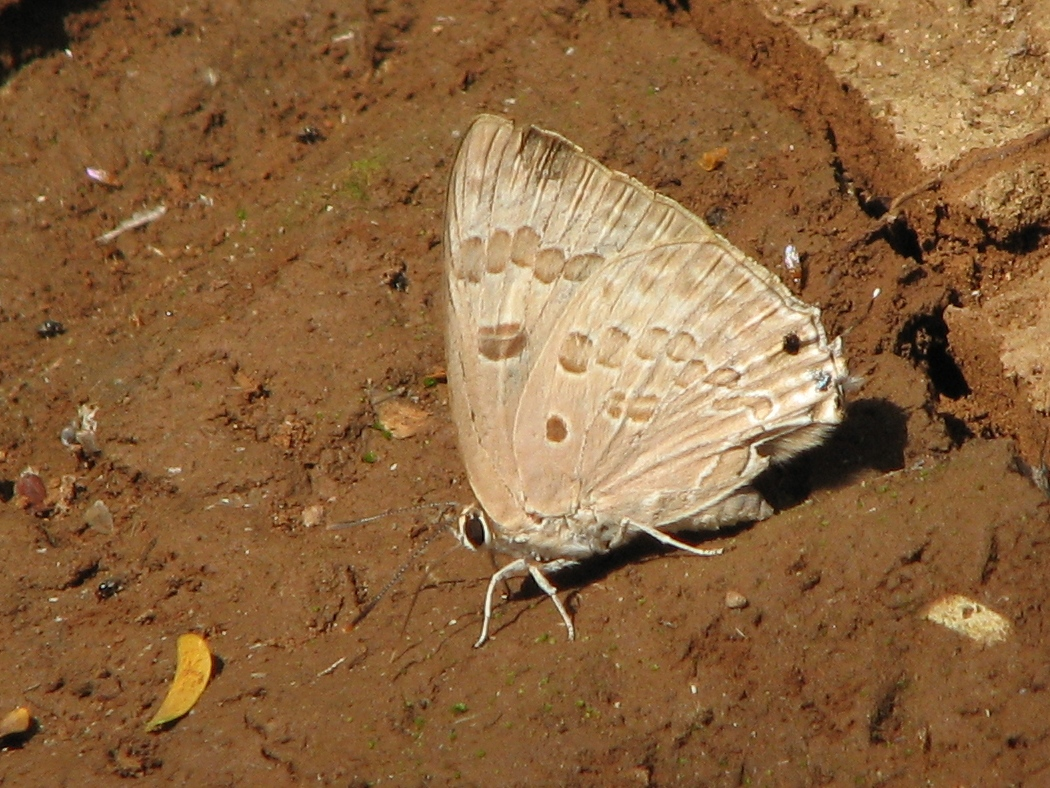

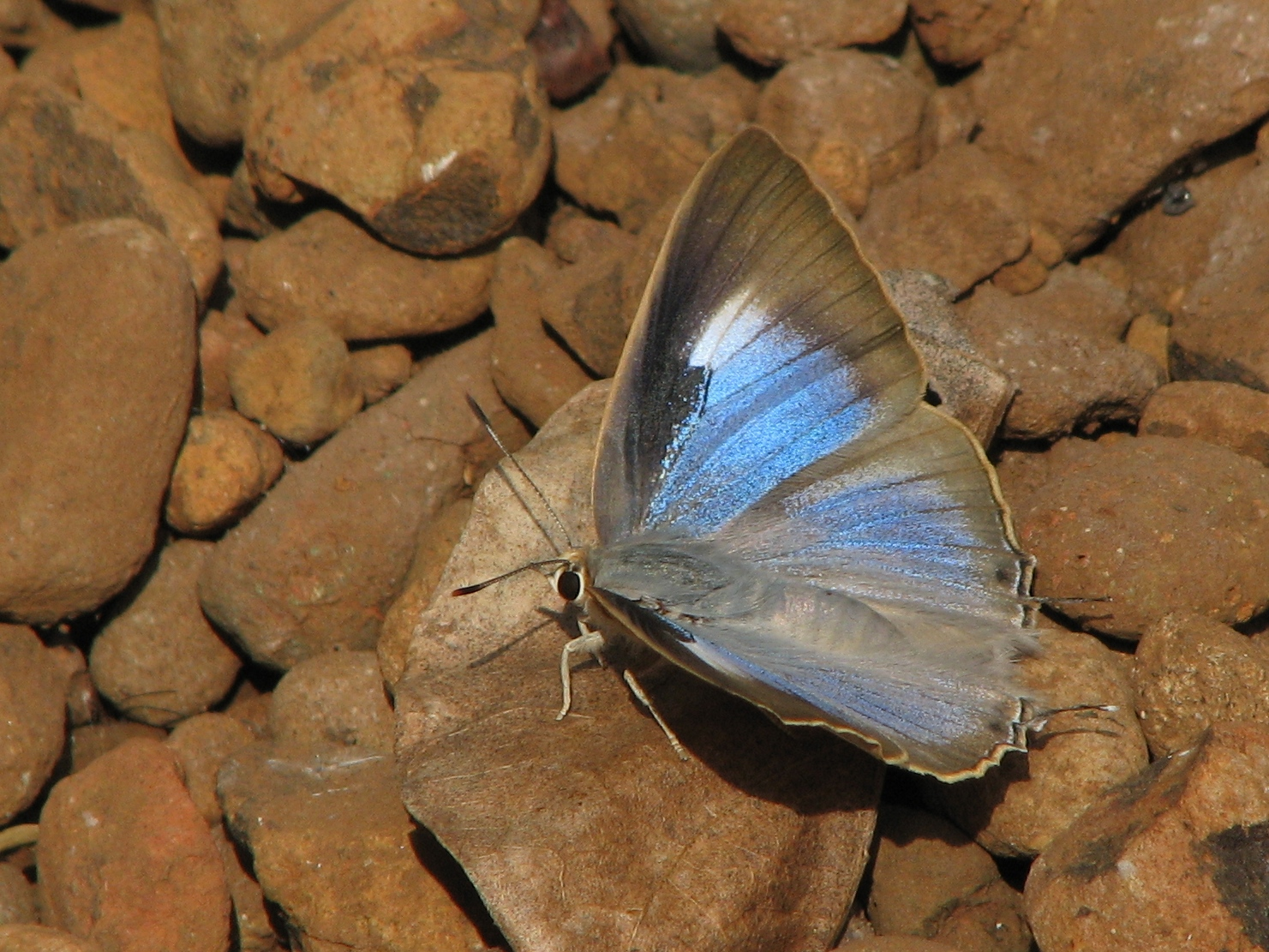

Scientific classification
- Kingdom: Animalia
- Phylum: Arthropoda
- Clade: Pancrustacea
- Class: Insecta
- Order: Lepidoptera
- Family: Lycaenidae
- Genus: Deudorix
- Species: D. perse

Binomial name
- Deudorix perse (Hewitson, 1863)

Synonyms
- Virachola perse

= Deudorix perse =

Large guava blue

Species of butterfly

Deudorix perse (formerly Virachola perse), the large guava blue, is a species of lycaenid or blue butterfly found in the Indomalayan realm. It was described by William Chapman Hewitson in 1863. The larva feeds on Randia dumetorum.

== Description ==
Male. Upperside. Forewing with the costa above the median vein up to the base of vein 2 deep black, the apex broadly black, the black colour occupying the whole apical space and outer margin, leaving the inner and lower portion of the wing blue; sometimes with an ochreous-red patch varying in size outside the cell. Hindwing with the costa broadly black, the band narrowing suddenly round the apex and continued narrowly down the outer margin to the anal angle; abdominal space also rather broadly black, the fold grey, the remaining inner space blue; the anal lobe black, with a dull ochreous spot in it; tail black, tipped with white; cilia of both wings black. Underside vinous-grey, sometimes with a red tinge; markings darker grey, pale edged. Forewing with an irregular rather large spot at the end of the cell with dark edges; a discal band of conjoined spots from the costa to near the sub-median vein, the lowest small, the first four outwardly oblique, the others straight down. commencing a little inwards. Hindwing with a black sub-basal spot below the costa, twin spots at the end of the cell, a discal band of conjoined spots, the third and fourth a little outside the others, its lower part curving suddenly in towards the abdominal margin below its middle; anal lobe black, a small round black spot in the first interspace ringed with ochreous. Antennae black, ringed with white, club with an ochreous-red tip; frons grey; eyes ringed with white; head and body black above, grey beneath. Female. Upperside paler blue, without gloss. Forewing with broad costal and outer marginal black borders, a white patch, sometimes tinged with ochreous beyond the cell. Hindwing with the costal and outer marginal black borders broader than ill the male, abdominal space clear of blackish suffusion, the fold blackish-grey, a white anteciliary line from the anal lobe to vein 2. Underside paler than the male, markings similarly disposed, but more defined.

— Charles Swinhoe, Lepidoptera Indica. Vol. IX

== Subspecies ==
- D. p. perse India to Thailand
- D. p. ghela Fruhstorfer, 1912 Ceylon, South India
- D. p. maseas Fruhstorfer, 1912
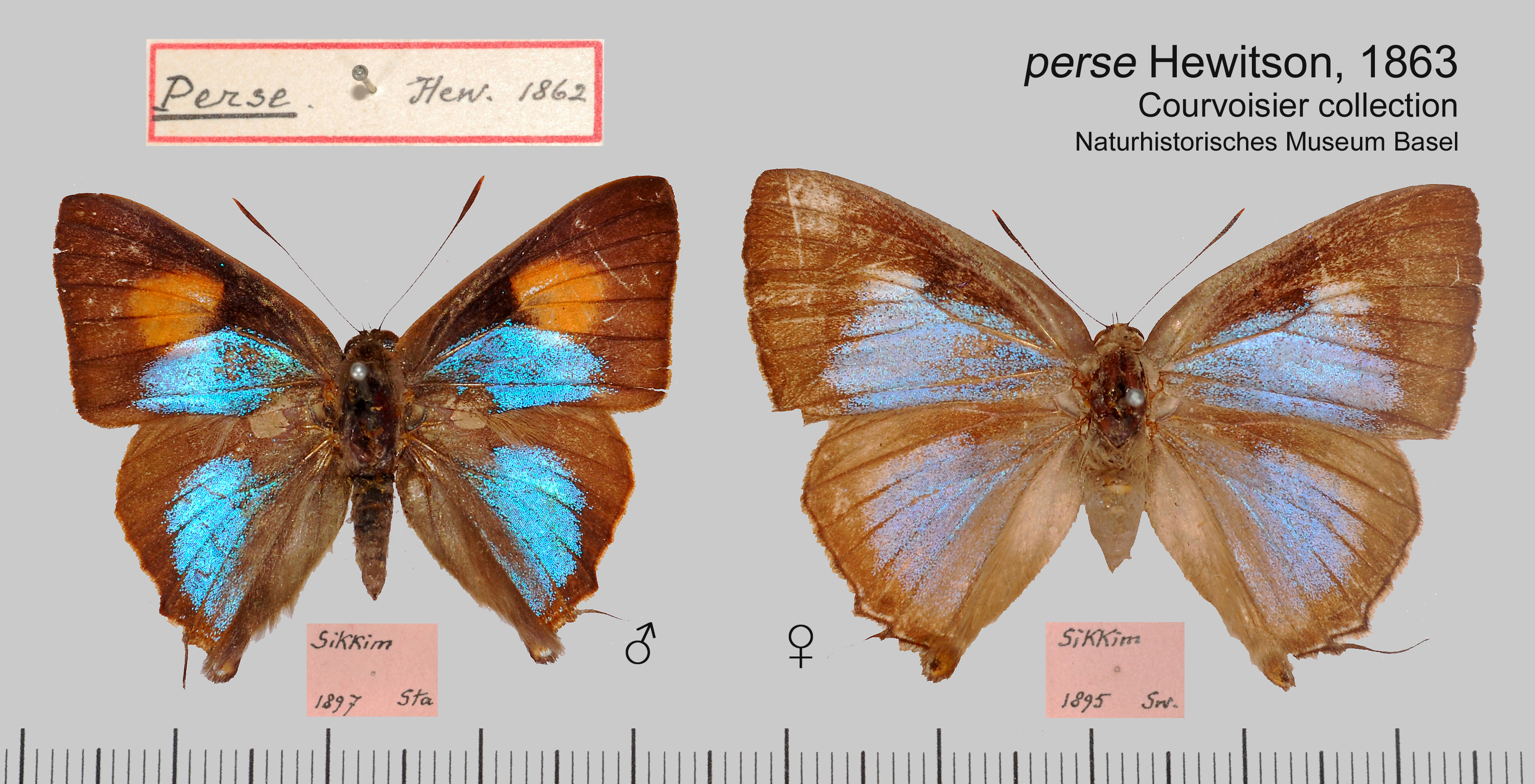
D. p. perse Courvoisier Collection, Basel
