= Charaxes lemosi =

Scientific classification
- Kingdom: Animalia
- Phylum: Arthropoda
- Class: Insecta
- Order: Lepidoptera
- Family: Nymphalidae
- Genus: Charaxes
- Species: C. lemosi

Binomial name
- Charaxes lemosi Joicey & Talbot, 1927

Species of butterfly

Charaxes lemosi is a butterfly in the family Nymphalidae. The species was described by James John Joicey and George Talbot in 1927. It is found on the island of Príncipe. The habitat consists of forests.

== Description ==
The wingspan of the male is 75 mm (3.0 in) while the female is 90 mm (3.5 in). Its diet consists mostly of fermented fruits.

== Taxonomy ==
The species has been treated as a subspecies of Charaxes lucretius by some authorities eg Gabriel (1932) and van Someren (1957).
