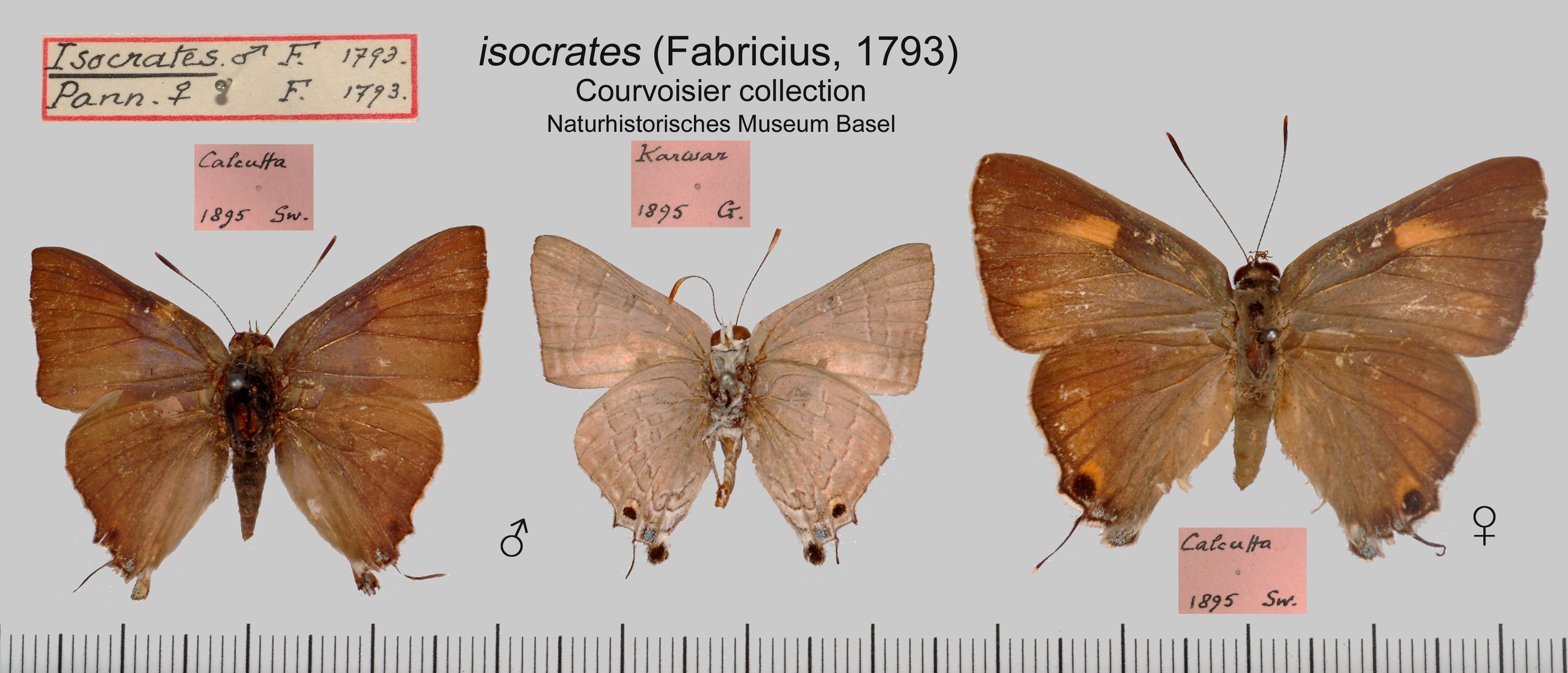
- Deudorix isocrates Courvoisier Collection, Basel

Scientific classification
- Kingdom: Animalia
- Phylum: Arthropoda
- Clade: Pancrustacea
- Class: Insecta
- Order: Lepidoptera
- Family: Lycaenidae
- Genus: Deudorix
- Species: D. isocrates

Binomial name
- Deudorix isocrates (Fabricius, 1793).

Synonyms
- Hesperia isocrates Fabricius, 1793; Hesperia pann Fabricius, 1793; Virachola isocrates Fabricius, 1793

= Deudorix isocrates =

Species of butterfly

Deudorix isocrates (sometimes Virachola isocrates), the common guava blue, is a species of butterfly in the family Lycaenidae. It was described by Johan Christian Fabricius in 1793. It is found in India, Sri Lanka and Indochina in the Indomalayan realm. Other common names include pomegranate butterfly, and anar butterfly.

The larvae feed on Randia dumetorum, Eriobotrya japonica, Psidium guajava, Tamarindus indica, Strychnos nux-vomica and Gardenia latifolia. It is a pest of pomegranates in India.

== Description ==
Male. Upperside violet-brown. Forewing with the colour darkening on the margins in certain lights showing a bright violet gloss on the inner area; an indistinct orange-ochreous patch, varying in size in different examples, beyond the cell, only visible in certain lights. Hindwing with the costal area and abdominal fold blackish-brown, anal lobe whitish with a black spot in it, varying in size in different examples, with some pale bluish-white scaling on its upper side, in some examples the black spot nearly fills the whole of the anal lobe; tail black, tipped with white. Cilia of both wings with the basal part black, the outer half white, becoming bluish grey below the tail and round the anal lobe. Underside vinous-grey, or slaty-grey, markings darker than the ground colour, edged on both sides with white. Forewing with a bar at the end of the cell, a discal band of conjoined spots, decreasing in size hindwards, nearly straight down, from near the costa to below vein 2, where the spot is very small. Hindwing with similar discoidal bar and discal band, the latter somewhat irregular, the third, fourth and sixth spots a little outside the others, then the band with a sudden curve reaches the abdominal margin a little below its middle; anal lobe black with a white spot on its upper inner side, a smaller black spot ringed with orange in the first interspace, with some blue, grey and white scaling between them; both wings with indications of a narrow sub-marginal band and very fine marginal grey line. Antennse black, ringed with white, club with an orange tip, with a white streak below at its base; frons greyish-white; eyes ringed with white; head and body above and below concolorous with the wings, abdomen below white. Female. Upperside brown. Forewing with the colour darkening towards the margins, the orange-ochreous patch larger and more distinct and varying much in extent, in some examples extending broadly to the base below the median vein. Underside as in the male, but the bands are broader and more outwardly curved, the black anal spots larger.

— Charles Swinhoe, Lepidoptera Indica. Vol. IX

Life cycle

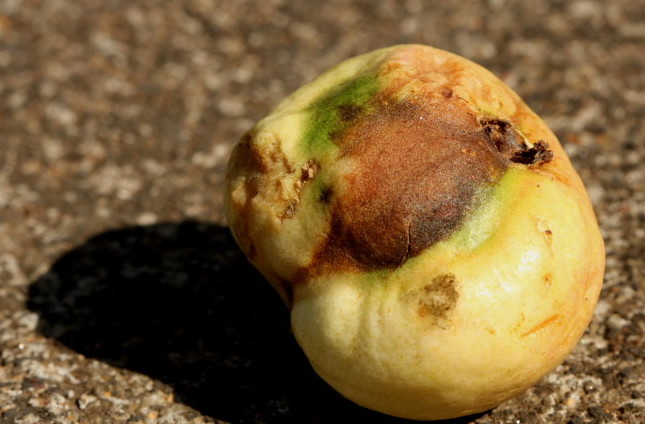
Infected guava

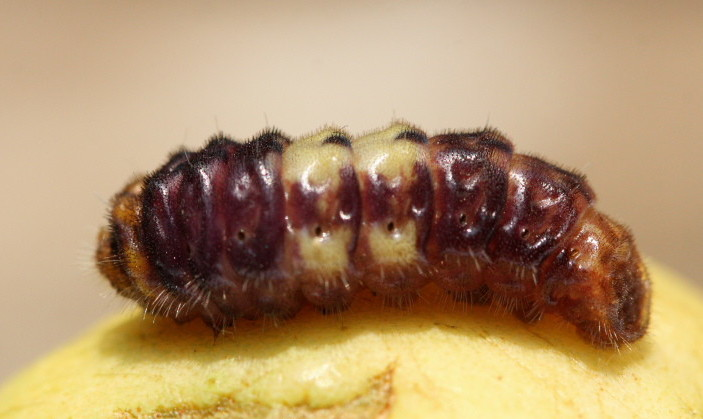
Larva

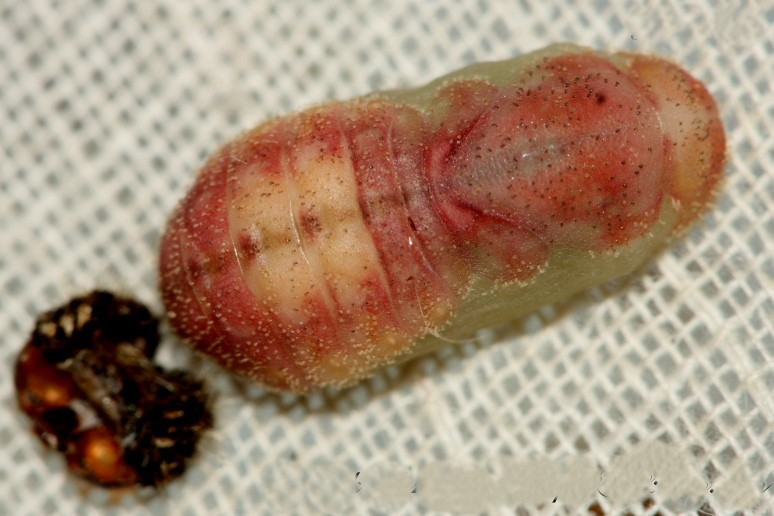
Pupa

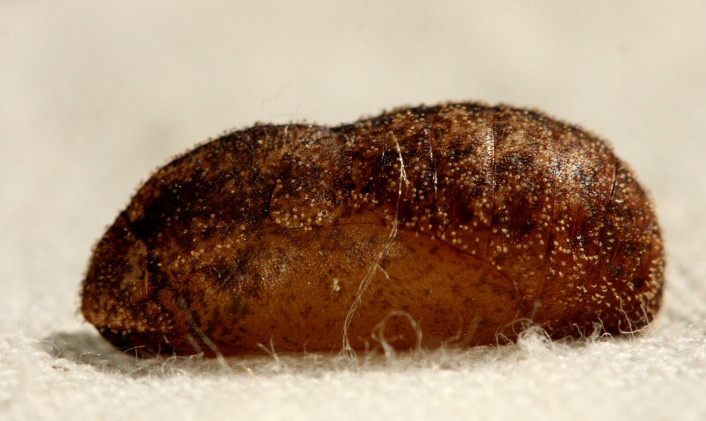
Pupa

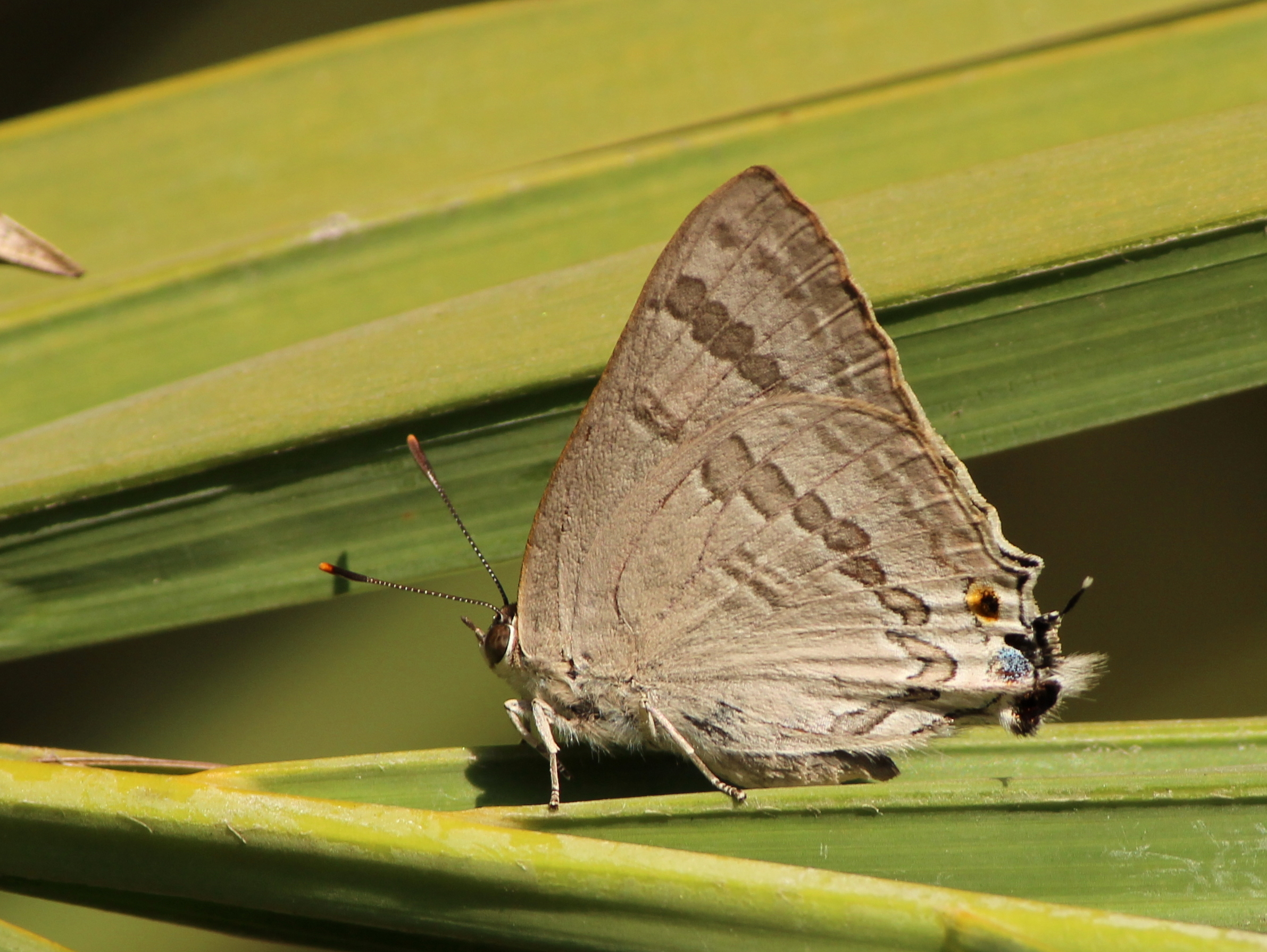
Virachola isocrates
