= Deudorix chalybeata =

Scientific classification
- Kingdom: Animalia
- Phylum: Arthropoda
- Class: Insecta
- Order: Lepidoptera
- Family: Lycaenidae
- Genus: Deudorix
- Species: D. chalybeata

Binomial name
- Deudorix chalybeata Joicey & Talbot, 1926

Synonyms
- Deudorix (Virachola) chalybeata

Species of butterfly

Deudorix chalybeata is a butterfly in the family Lycaenidae. It is found on São Tomé Island.

Within the family Lycaenidae, Deudorix is a genus found in the Old World and Australia.

It was first described by James John Joicey and Talbot in 1926.
