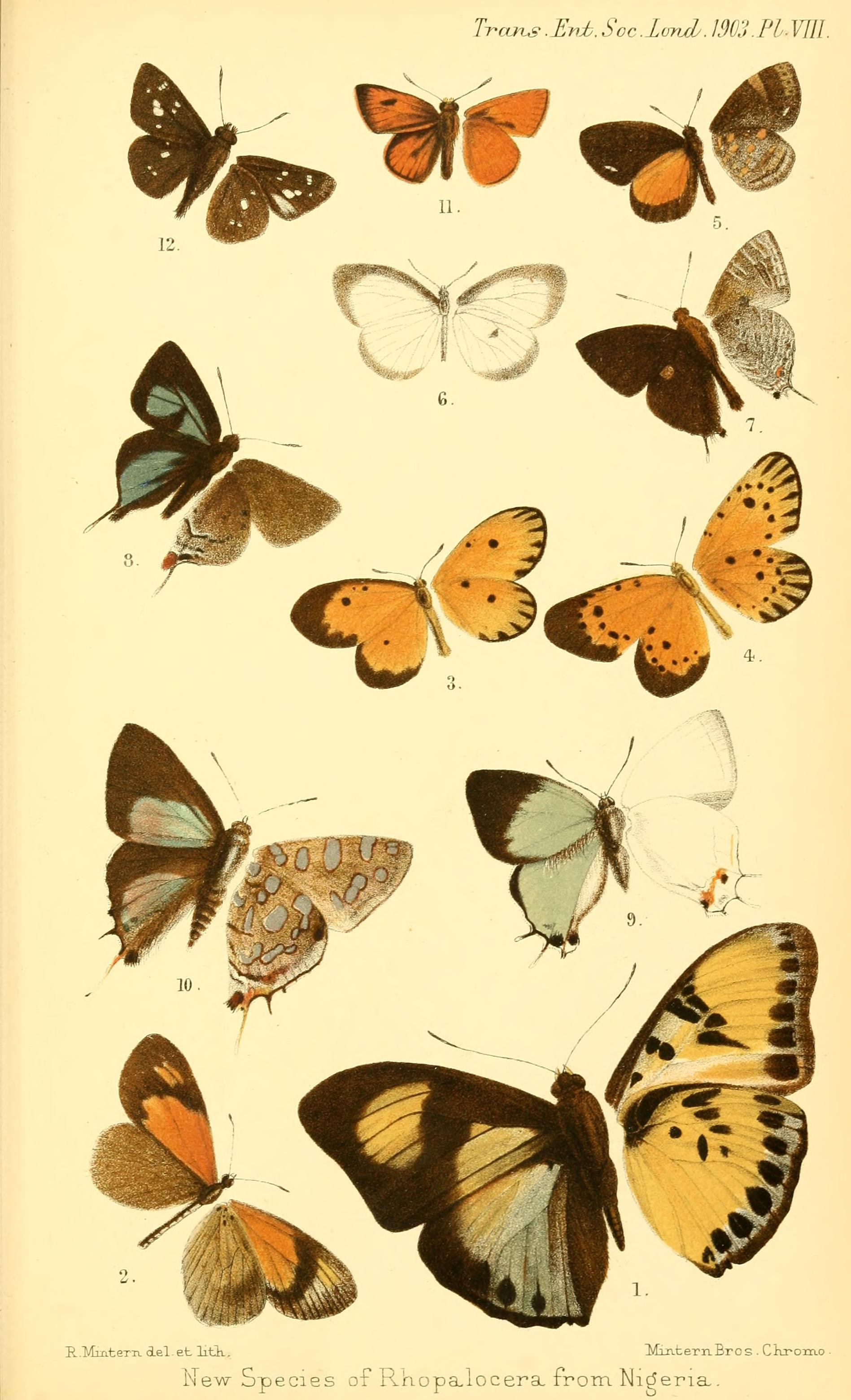
- Figure 7

Scientific classification
- Kingdom: Animalia
- Phylum: Arthropoda
- Clade: Pancrustacea
- Class: Insecta
- Order: Lepidoptera
- Family: Lycaenidae
- Genus: Deudorix
- Species: D. caliginosa

Binomial name
- Deudorix caliginosa Lathy, 1903

Synonyms
- Deudorix (Virachola) caliginosa

= Deudorix caliginosa =

Species of butterfly

Deudorix caliginosa, the dark brown playboy, is a butterfly in the family Lycaenidae. It is found in Ivory Coast, Ghana, southern Nigeria, Cameroon, Bioko, São Tomé and Príncipe, the Republic of the Congo, Uganda, western Kenya, north-western Tanzania, Malawi, Zambia, Mozambique and eastern Zimbabwe. The butterfly's habitat is forest.

Adults have been recorded feeding from flowers on bushes and both sexes mud-puddle.
