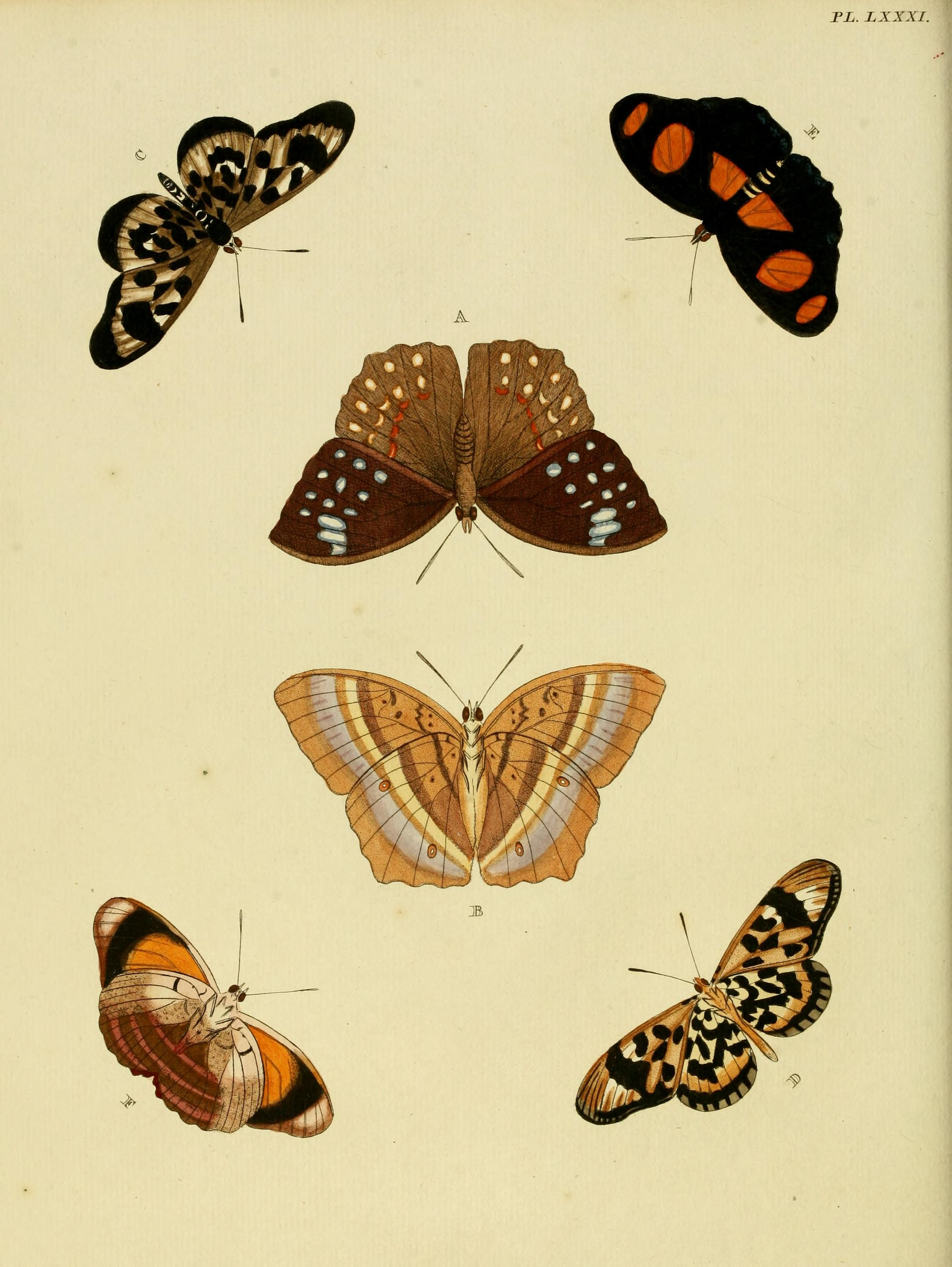
- Figures c and d

Scientific classification
- Kingdom: Animalia
- Phylum: Arthropoda
- Class: Insecta
- Order: Lepidoptera
- Family: Nymphalidae
- Genus: Acraea
- Species: A. medea

Binomial name
- Acraea medea (Cramer, 1775)

Synonyms
- Papilio medea Cramer, 1775 (nec Fabricius); Acraea (Acraea) medea; Papilio pasiphae Fabricius, 1781; Telchinia saronis Hübner, 1819; Acraea egina medea Eltringham, 1912

= Acraea medea =

Species of butterfly

Acraea medea is a butterfly in the family Nymphalidae. It is found on the island of Príncipe. It is also considered a subspecies of Acraea egina, Acraea egina medea.

== Description ==
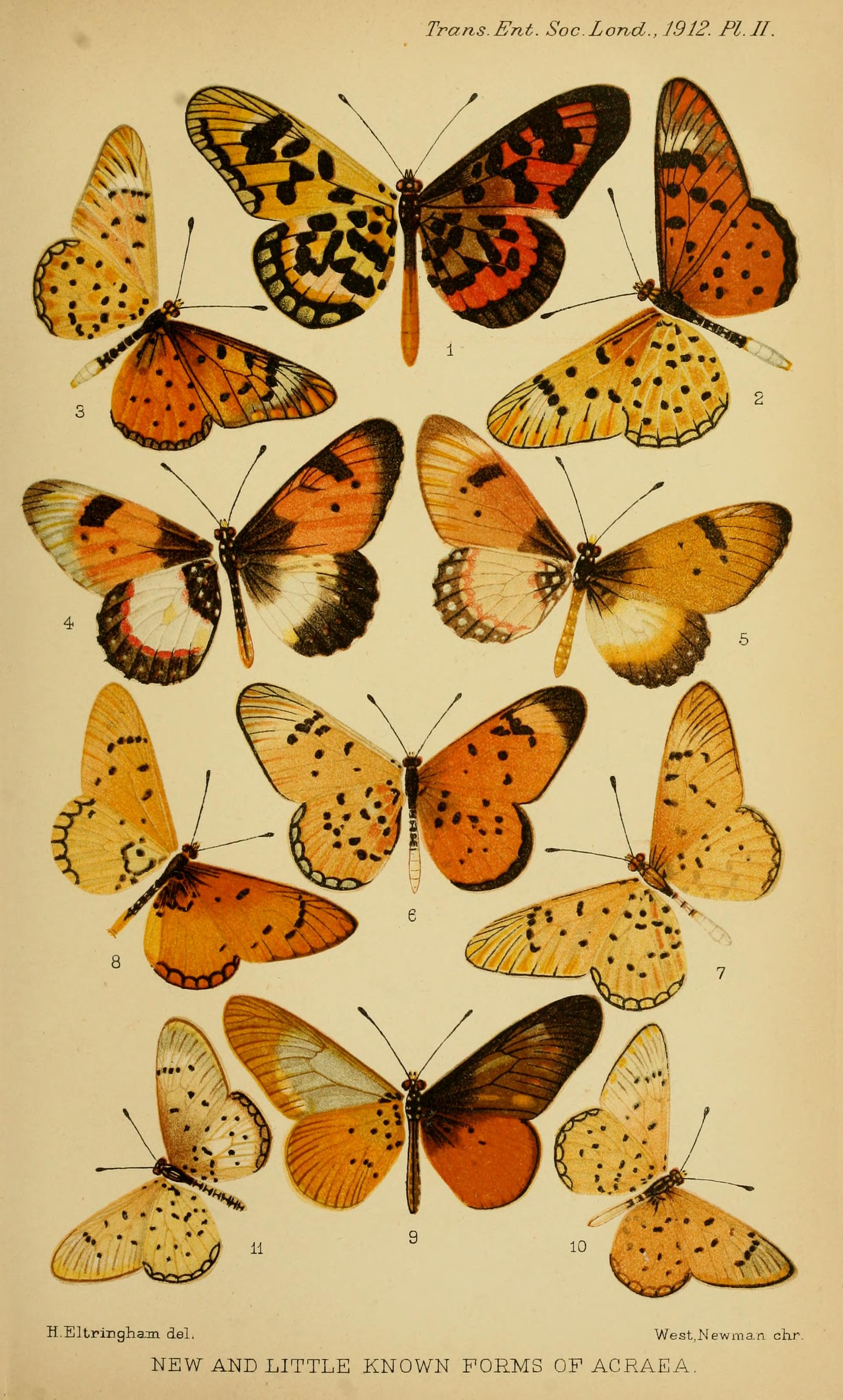
Fig 1 as Acraea egina medea

A. medea Cr. (54 d) is in my [Aurivillius] opinion best treated as an independent species. The light yellow marginal spots on the underside of the forewing and the thick black submarginal line which bounds them proximally form quite a new feature, to which nothing in egina and its races corresponds. Both wings above at the base broadly black to vein 2 or 3, then as far as the sharply defined black marginal band, which is 4 to 5 mm. in breadth, yellow-red (male) or white (female) with very large discal dots, arranged quite as in egina; fore wing beneath reddish, at the base and in the female also in the middle light yellow or whitish; hindwing beneath in the middle greenish light yellow or whitish, at the base and at the marginal band with brown-red or orange-yellow spots. Princes Island

== Taxonomy ==
It is a member of the Acraea egina species group - but see also Pierre & Bernaud, 2014
