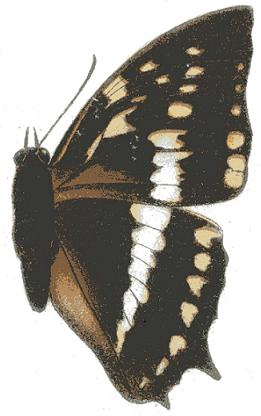

Scientific classification
- Kingdom: Animalia
- Phylum: Arthropoda
- Class: Insecta
- Order: Lepidoptera
- Family: Nymphalidae
- Subfamily: Charaxinae
- Tribe: Charaxini
- Genus: Charaxes
- Species: C. odysseus

Binomial name
- Charaxes odysseus Staudinger, 1892

= Charaxes odysseus =

Species of butterfly

Charaxes odysseus is a butterfly in the family Nymphalidae. It is found on the island of São Tomé. The species was described by Otto Staudinger in 1892.

== Description ==
The wingspan of the male is 75 mm and the female is 95 mm. The butterfly has a black wing with brown edges, white-brown dots at the end, white line in the middle and other white-brown dots on top. Seitz- Of this rare species only the female is known. It somewhat recalls the female of lucretius but is smaller, has short, obtuse tails to the hindwing and instead of the light marginal band on the hindwing a row of 6 white submarginal spots in cellules 2—7. The wings are dark umber-brown above, somewhat lighter at the base of the forewing, and have beyond the middle a narrow whitish discal band, more or less broken up into spots, two being placed in cellule 5 and two in cellule 6 of the hindwing; in the basal part of cellules 3—6 on the forewing there are also small light spots; forewing at the distal margin with light spots in cellules lb—3. One of the many species peculiar to the island of St. Thome.

== Taxonomy ==
It is considered part of the Charaxes lucretius group.
