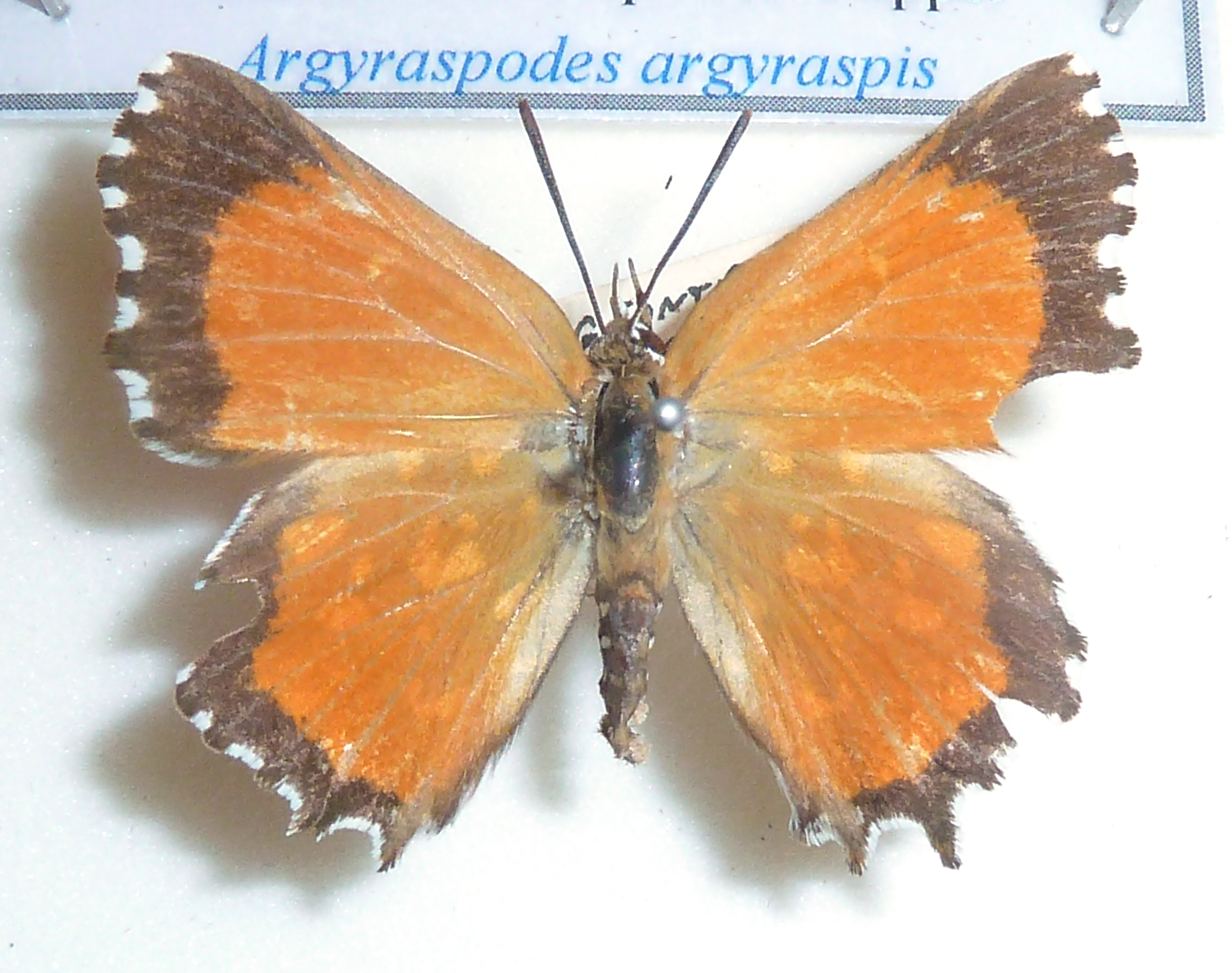

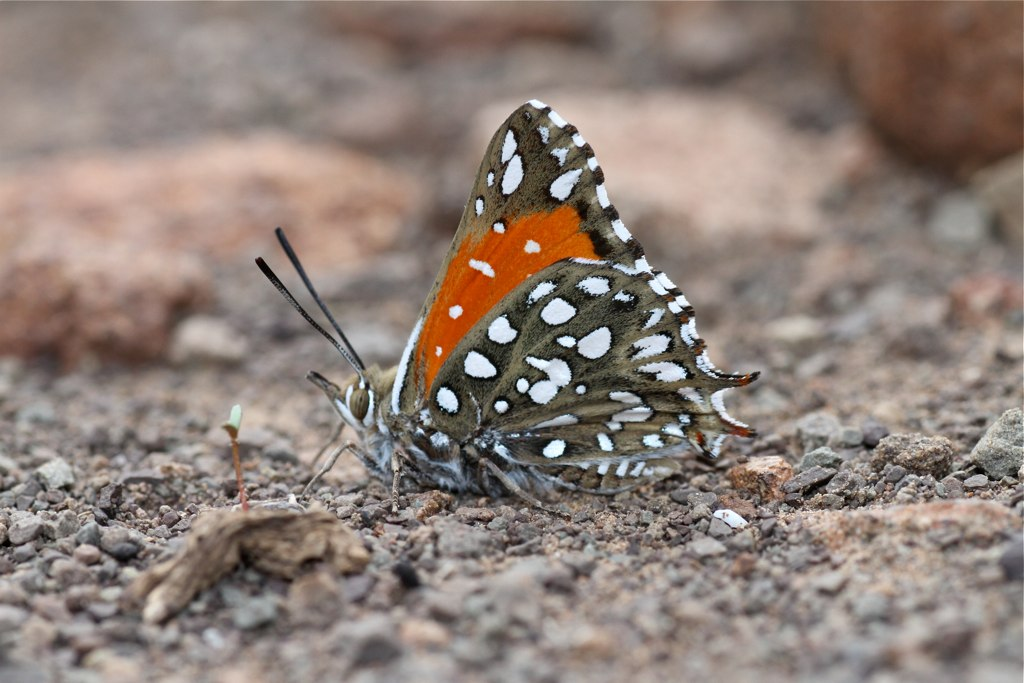

Scientific classification
- Kingdom: Animalia
- Phylum: Arthropoda
- Clade: Pancrustacea
- Class: Insecta
- Order: Lepidoptera
- Family: Lycaenidae
- Subfamily: Aphnaeinae
- Genus: Argyraspodes; Tite & Dickson, 1973
- Species: A. argyraspis

Binomial name
- Argyraspodes argyraspis (Trimen, 1873)

Synonyms
- Zeritis argyraspis Trimen, 1873; Phasis argyraspis; Phasis argyraspis f. labuschagnei van Son, 1959

= Argyraspodes =

Warrior silver-spotted copper

Monotypic butterfly genus in family Lycaenidae

Argyraspodes is a butterfly genus in the family Lycaenidae. It is monotypic containing only the species Argyraspodes argyraspis, the warrior silver-spotted copper, which is found in South Africa, in the Western and Eastern Cape, Free State and Northern Cape.

== Description ==
The wingspan is 32–38 mm for males and 35–45 mm females. Adults are on wing from August to March and sometimes from July to April.

== Habitat and behavior ==
Males are territorial and are noted for establishing said territories on subtle, rocky outcrops. These butterflies show characteristics of "labuschagnei" form, having specific markings on their undersides and dark borders on their upperwings.

There has been an unusually high occurrence sighted, which is attributed to the above-average rainfall in the Kalahari during summers.
