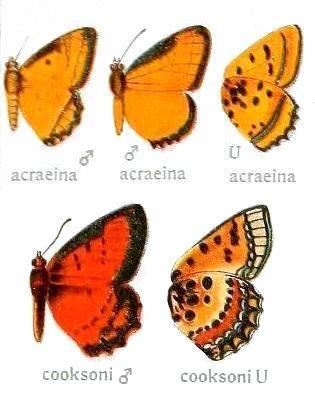
- E. acraeina and E. cooksoni

Scientific classification
- Kingdom: Animalia
- Phylum: Arthropoda
- Class: Insecta
- Order: Lepidoptera
- Family: Lycaenidae
- Subfamily: Aphnaeinae
- Genus: Erikssonia; Trimen, 1891

= Erikssonia (butterfly) =

Butterfly genus in family Lycaenidae

Erikssonia is a genus of butterflies in the family Lycaenidae. They are found on sandy substrates, though E. edgei appears to be found on more loamy sand than its congeners. They are slow fliers.

== Description ==
Members are characterized by small heads, glabrous eyes, and long palpi where the second segment is laterally compressed. The antennae are short and lack a distinct club. The thorax is short and slender, while the male foreleg tarsus is longer than tibia and equipped with spicules. The foreleg also features a sharp foretarsal claw, and the mid and hindlegs possess tibial spicules with large and robust claws.

The wings exhibit an arched base with a straight or weakly arched costa. The hindwings are oval with an obtuse extension at 1A+2A, while the forewings are equipped with twelve veins.

=== Male genitalia ===
The hook-like structure, uncus, is crescent shaped. Its subunci are long and curved, and the tegumen has a convex proximal edge. The ninth ventral segment, or the vinculum, is narrow with a rounded saccus, and the juxta is shield-shaped with a deep notch on its upper edge. The valves are cylindrical and thin out distally, havingupper processes. The inseminating organ, the aedeagus, is swollen at the base. These structures also contain an obliquely truncate tip and lateral cornuti, along with the protective sheath, the vesica which holds large cornuti.

== Phylogenic relationships ==
Erikssonia is closely related to the genus Aloeides, with additional affinities to Tylopaedia and Aphnaeus. Key differences in comparison to Aloeides include:

- A smaller and narrower head
- A short and slender thorax, compared to the robust thorax in Aloeides
- Radial veins R3, R4, and R5 that originate further along M1
- M2 originates almost at the base of M1, similar to Tylopaedia and Aphnaeus (in Aloeides, M2 originates midway between M1 and M3)
- The forewing margin is often angled at M1
- A long and slender aedeagus like Aphnaeus, unlike short and broad in Aloeides
- Convoluted eggs in Erikssonia, compared to indented eggs in Aloeides.

== Identification ==
The key to identifying species within the genus Erikssonia is based on specific wing characteristics. If the hindwing underside's marginal area is divided into distinct pale spots, the species is identified as Erikssonia cooksoni. However, if this marginal area is not divided into pale spots, the identification proceeds to examining the forewing. In the case of Erikssonia alaponoxa, the forewing is elongated with a straight margin that is angled at M2 region, displaying reddish-orange upper side and blackened wing base coloration. In contrast, Erikssonia acraeina exhibits a forewing that is not elongated, with margin that is neither straight nor angled at the M2 region. Its upperside is orange, and the wing bases are entirely unblackened.

== Species ==
There are four species:

- Erikssonia acraeina Trimen, 1891 – Eriksson's copper
- Erikssonia bouyeri Gardiner, 2012
- Erikssonia cooksoni Druce, 1905 – Cookson's copper
- Erikssonia edgei Gardiner & Terblanche, 2010 – Waterberg copper
