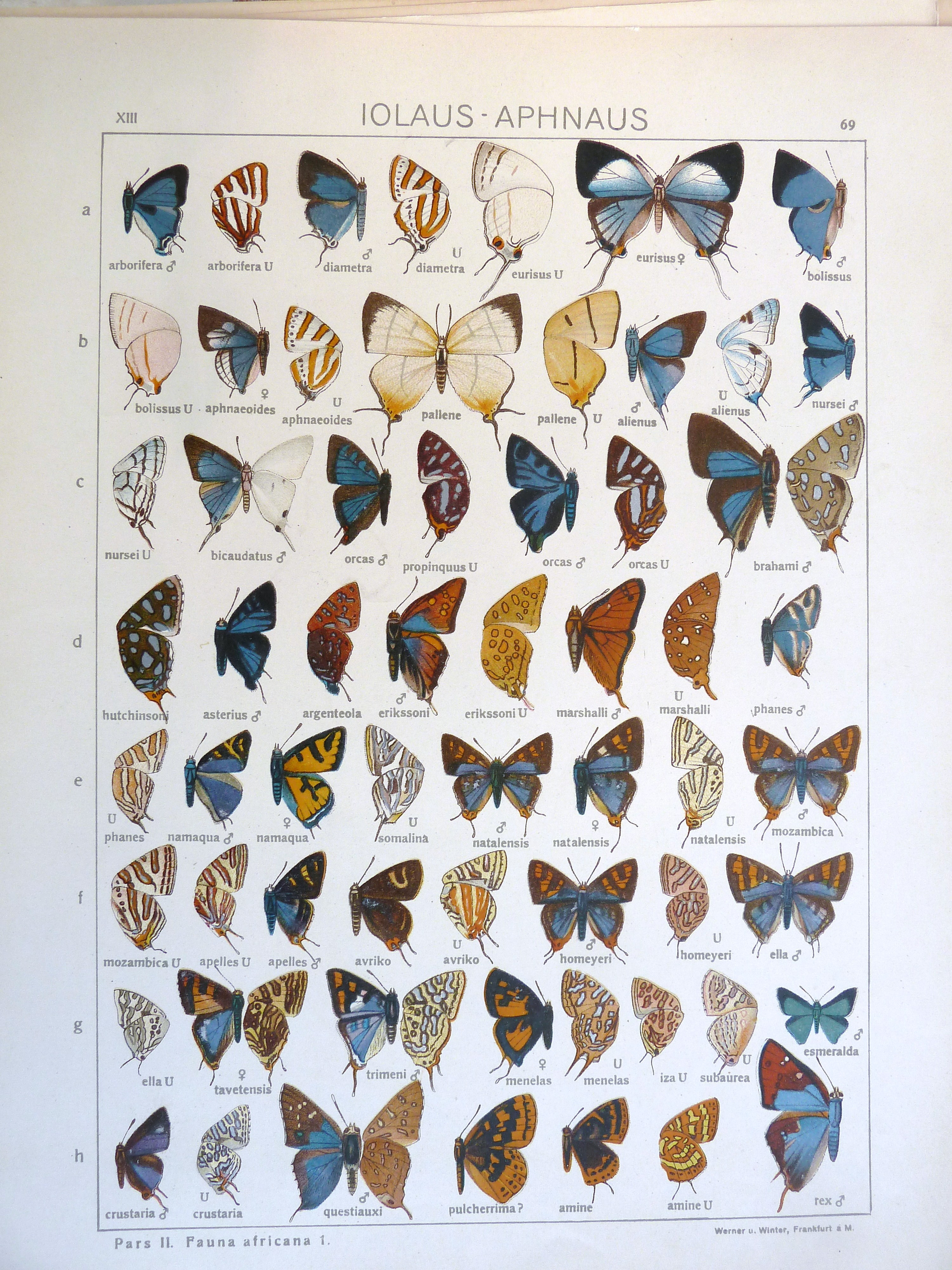
- Seitz Fauna AfricanaTaf 69 (line d)

Scientific classification
- Kingdom: Animalia
- Phylum: Arthropoda
- Class: Insecta
- Order: Lepidoptera
- Family: Lycaenidae
- Genus: Aphnaeus
- Species: A. hutchinsonii

Binomial name
- Aphnaeus hutchinsonii Trimen, 1887

Synonyms
- Paraphnaeus hutchinsoni; Aphnaeus zanzibarensis Grose-Smith, 1889; Aphnaeus drucei Neave, 1904

= Aphnaeus hutchinsonii =

Species of butterfly

Aphnaeus hutchinsonii, the Hutchinson's silver spot or Hutchinson's high-flier, is a butterfly of the family Lycaenidae. It is found in South Africa, Botswana, Mozambique, from Zimbabwe through eastern Africa to Somalia. In South Africa it is found from northern KwaZulu-Natal to Gauteng, Mpumalanga and Limpopo.

The wingspan is 29.5–33 mm (1.16–1.30 in) for males and 32–43 mm (1.3–1.7 in) for females. Adults are on wing from September to January with a peak from October to November. There is one generation per year.

The larvae feed on Acacia robusta, Burkea africana, Loranthus and Viscum species. The larvae are attended by ants.
