= Aphnaeus affinis =

Scientific classification
- Domain: Eukaryota
- Kingdom: Animalia
- Phylum: Arthropoda
- Class: Insecta
- Order: Lepidoptera
- Family: Lycaenidae
- Genus: Aphnaeus
- Species: A. affinis

Binomial name
- Aphnaeus affinis Riley, 1921

Synonyms
- Aphnaeus affinis seydeli Berger, 1953

Species of butterfly

Aphnaeus affinis is a butterfly in the family Lycaenidae. It is found in the Democratic Republic of Congo (Lualaba and Shaba) and northern Zambia.
