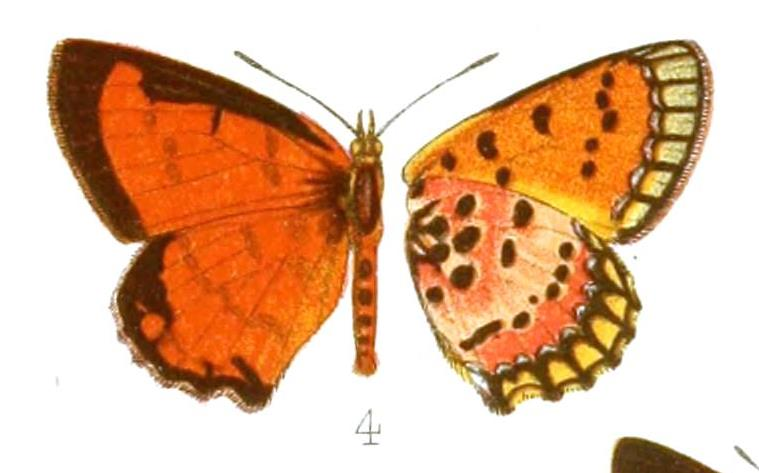

Scientific classification
- Domain: Eukaryota
- Kingdom: Animalia
- Phylum: Arthropoda
- Class: Insecta
- Order: Lepidoptera
- Family: Lycaenidae
- Genus: Erikssonia
- Species: E. cooksoni

Binomial name
- Erikssonia cooksoni H. H. Druce, 1905

= Erikssonia cooksoni =

Cookson's copper

Species of butterfly

Erikssonia cooksoni, the Cookson's copper, is a butterfly of the family Lycaenidae. The species was first described by Hamilton Herbert Druce in 1905. It is found in the Democratic Republic of the Congo (Lualaba) and north-western Zambia. It is found in sparse miombo woodland with low herbs.

Adults are on wing in September and January.

The larvae feed on Gnidia involucrata.
