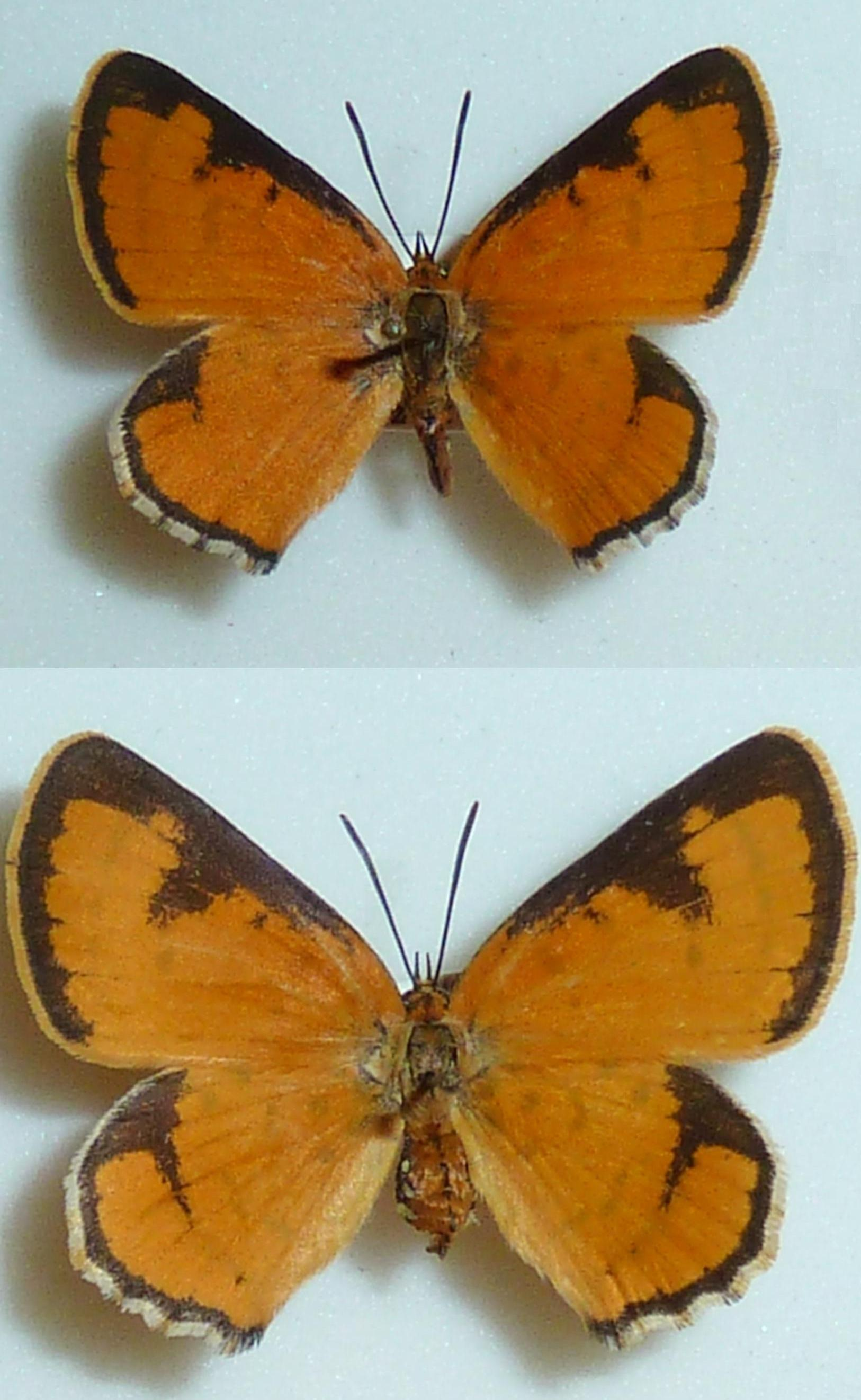
- Male and female

Scientific classification
- Kingdom: Animalia
- Phylum: Arthropoda
- Clade: Pancrustacea
- Class: Insecta
- Order: Lepidoptera
- Family: Lycaenidae
- Genus: Erikssonia
- Species: E. edgei

Binomial name
- Erikssonia edgei Gardiner & Terblanche, 2010
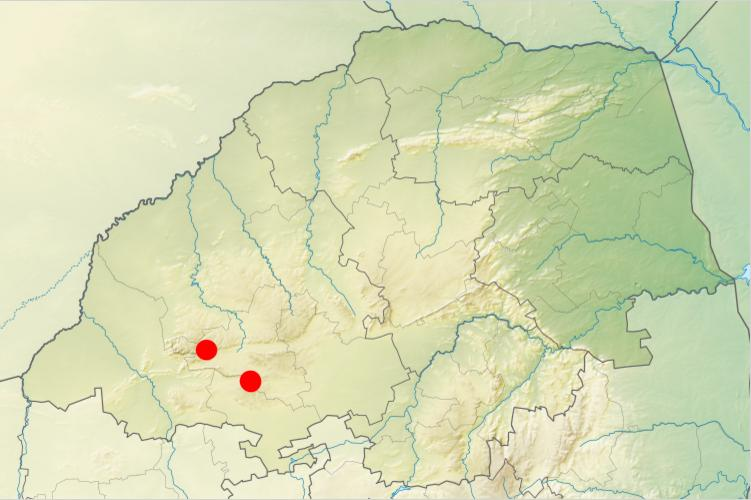
- Range in Limpopo, South Africa

= Erikssonia edgei =

Waterberg copper

Species of butterfly

Erikssonia edgei, commonly known as the Waterberg copper, tilodi copper or Edge's acraea copper, is an obligate myrmecophilous lycaenid butterfly, which is native to Limpopo, South Africa. The critically endangered butterfly occurs in high-altitude grasslands on sandy substrates, and has only been obtained from the type and one subsequent locality. The population at the type locality, a farm in the Waterberg, went extinct about 12 years after its 1980 discovery. It was afforded species status in 2010, when no extant populations were known. The status of two populations, discovered in 2013 at a private nature reserve to the southeast, remains indeterminate.

== Description and biology ==
The forewing length is 12.3-16.8 mm for males and 16.1–19.1 mm for females. It was found to be closely related to the Aloeides rough coppers (cf. A. dentatis and A. thyra) and like them, is associated with ground-nesting ants. The larvae feed on two species of Gnidia, both poisonous, and shelter by day in the nests of Lepisiota ants, wherein the pupae also develop.

Adults are on wing from November to April. They fly slowly and weakly in the vicinity of their host plants, and dive into the grass when disturbed. The males are territorial during the warmer hours of the day, but the females not. They like basking in the sun, and often feed on nectar, but not during the hours devoted to territorial behaviour or egg-laying. In cool cloudy weather they may be found resting on the sand between grass tufts.

=== Egg-laying ===
A female that is ready to oviposit will investigate the surfaces of plants with her antennae. When she encounters the food plant she uses her antennae to search for traces of the trail pheromones of the host ant. Upon encountering this, she will walk down until she reaches the ground at the base of the plant. There she will oviposit the yellowish ochre eggs by curving her abdomen down to the ground surface. The eggs darken to greyish brown, and their appearance has been likened to a truffle. Their micro-structure is considered quite unique among lycaenid eggs. Ants carry the eggs into the nest where the larvae hatch in about 18 days, and congregate with the ant brood.

=== Instars ===
The different larval instars are fairly uniform in appearance. They have pinkish grey bodies with a maroon line down the dorsum, flanked by bluish green and regular reddish brown markings on the sides. The head is dark with yellow markings, while the neck and anal shields are likewise dark, but with a broad, yellow median line. The well-developed honey-gland is located on the seventh segment, and retractile white tubercles with protective spines are located on the eighth segment.

The larvae shelter during the day in the nest of the host ant, and emerge at night, sometimes simultaneously, to feed on the host plant. The first two instars feed on the leaf surfaces, while the third and fourth begin to consume the leaf margins. The larvae are much larger than the ants, which always accompany them. The ants may stroke them slowly with their antennae, and often feed at their honey-glands. Motionless larvae may extrude their tubercles to ward them off. The 5th and 6th instars feed only on leaf edges. The sixth and last instar takes about three weeks to grow to over 3 cm in length. It pupates inside the ant nest, but will only expand its wings once exposed to light.

== Range and populations ==
It has only been found in Limpopo, South Africa, and was originally deemed to be a southern population of E. acraeina. No specimens were obtained in the years 1993 to 2012, and the southern population was feared extinct. As of 2017, it status is indeterminate as its continued presence at Bateleur Nature Reserve has not been confirmed.

=== Jan Trichardt's Pass ===
The first known population was located at 1,595 m.a.s.l. in a sparse mountain bushveld near Jan Trichardt's Pass in the central Waterberg. They frequented 3 ha at the northwestern base of Perdekop, a peak on the edge of an expansive, level valley. It was discovered there on 21 December 1980 by Dr. Dave Edge, who was accompanied by his spouse Esmé. This population was known to fly from December to early February. About 12 years later it was locally extinct, and no other populations were then known. Its local extinction was ascribed to habitat changes induced by altered grazing and fire management practices. The short grass and host plants were taken over by turpentine grass during a period when the conservation area suffered from poor administration.

=== Bateleur Nature Reserve ===
On 2 March 2013, Prof. Mark Williams and his spouse Tildie discovered two new colonies in a 5 ha area of the private Bateleur Nature Reserve, some 42 km southeast of the type locality. They are situated at 1,550 and 1,580 m.a.s.l. respectively. This population was found to fly from November to April. Jeremy Dobson and Owen Garvie were assigned to implement a conservation plan for this new locality in the southeastern Waterberg. Vegetation at the new locality is treeless grassland, with the hitherto known larval host-plant, Gnidia kraussiana, present but uncommon. Females were observed to lay their eggs at the base of Gnidia microcephala besides G. kraussiana, and the ant host appeared to be a Lepisiota species, as was the case at the type locality. Following the severe 2015/2016 drought, the butterflies did not appear as expected in November 2016.

== Etymology ==
It is named after Dr. Dave Edge, who, together with Esmé Edge, discovered the population in the Waterberg Mountains near Vaalwater and first realized this species to be distinct. Tilodi recalls Tlodi game farm where it was discovered, tlodi being the Pedi word for serval.
