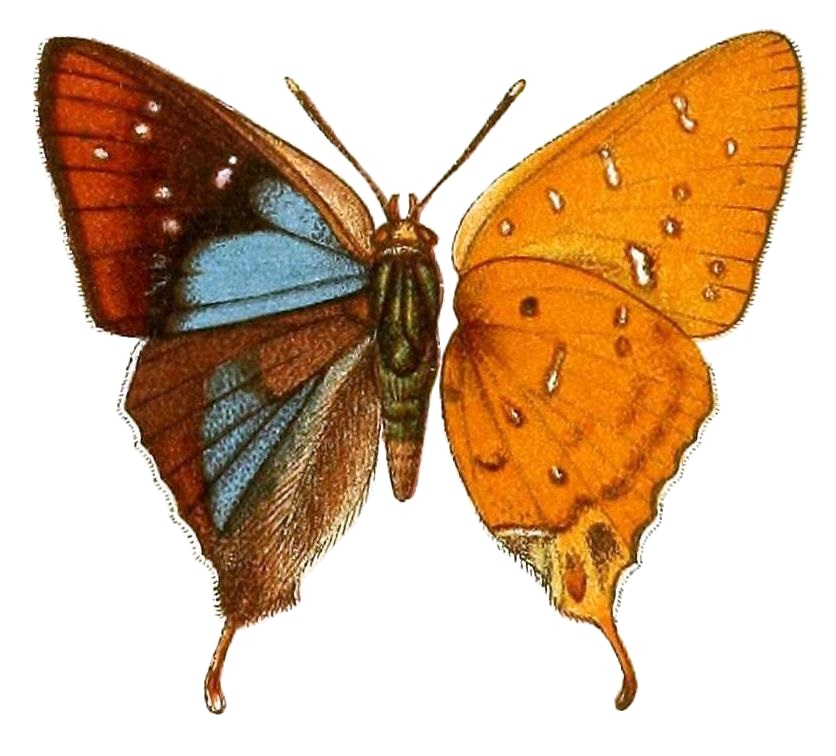
- female

Scientific classification
- Domain: Eukaryota
- Kingdom: Animalia
- Phylum: Arthropoda
- Class: Insecta
- Order: Lepidoptera
- Family: Lycaenidae
- Genus: Aphnaeus
- Species: A. questiauxi

Binomial name
- Aphnaeus questiauxi Aurivillius, 1903

= Aphnaeus questiauxi =

Northern highflier

Species of butterfly

Aphnaeus questiauxi is a butterfly in the family Lycaenidae. It is found in the Democratic Republic of the Congo (from the south-eastern part of the country to Lualaba) and Zambia.
