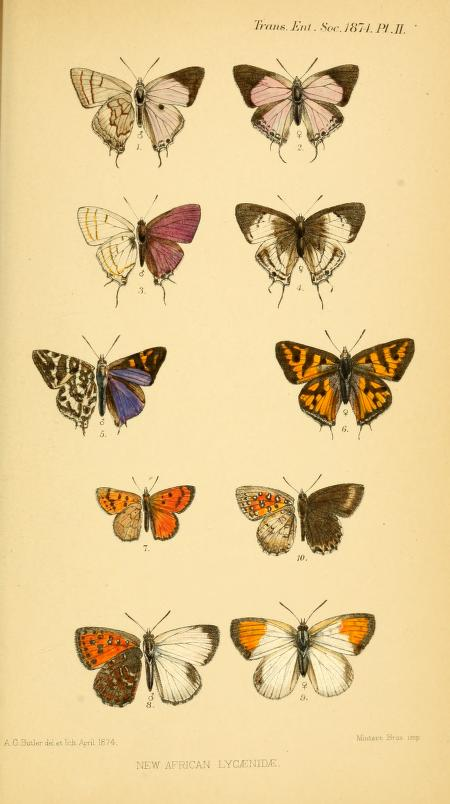
- Zeritis from South Africa (figures 7-10)

Scientific classification
- Domain: Eukaryota
- Kingdom: Animalia
- Phylum: Arthropoda
- Class: Insecta
- Order: Lepidoptera
- Family: Lycaenidae
- Subfamily: Aphnaeinae
- Genus: Zeritis; Boisduval, [1836]

Species
- See text

= Zeritis =

Butterfly genus in family Lycaenidae

Zeritis is a genus of butterflies in the family Lycaenidae. The species of this genus are found in the Afrotropical realm.

== Species ==
The genus includes the following species:

- Zeritis aurivillii Schultze, 1908
- Zeritis fontainei Stempffer, 1956
- Zeritis krystyna D'Abrera, 1980
- Zeritis neriene Boisduval, [1836]
- Zeritis pulcherrima Aurivillius, 1923
- Zeritis sorhagenii (Dewitz, 1879)
