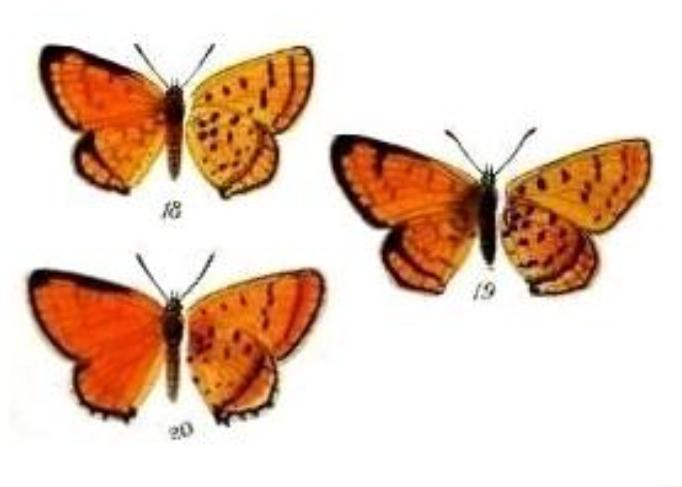

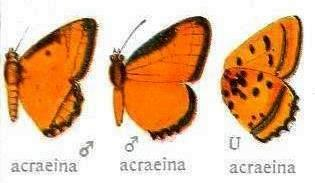

Conservation status
- Least Concern (IUCN 3.1)

Scientific classification
- Kingdom: Animalia
- Phylum: Arthropoda
- Class: Insecta
- Order: Lepidoptera
- Family: Lycaenidae
- Genus: Erikssonia
- Species: E. acraeina

Binomial name
- Erikssonia acraeina Trimen, 1891

Synonyms
- Erikssonia alaponoxa Henning & Henning, 2001

= Erikssonia acraeina =

Species of butterfly

Erikssonia acraeina, the Eriksson's copper, is a species of butterfly in the family Lycaenidae. It was long thought to be monotypic within the genus Erikssonia. It is found in the southern parts of the Democratic Republic of the Congo, southern and south-eastern Angola, and western and north-western Zambia (Mongu, Kataba, Mundwiji Plain).

The South African population on the Waterberg is now treated as Erikssonia edgei.

== Description ==
The length of the forewing is 15–18 mm in males and 16–21 mm in females, with an antenna-wing ratio of 0.51–0.55. The flight period extends from December to February.

Adults are on wing through most of the summer months, having been recorded from October to April, with a peak in activity from January to March.

== Distribution and behavior ==
The type locality of this species is reported as Omrora, Okavango River, Otiembora. The species inhabits sandy savanna areas and woodlands dominated by Burkea africana, Ochna pulchra, and Protea afra.

Males exhibit slow flight and territorial behavior during warm hours. This species is believed to be unpalatable to predators, a trait that is assumed to be associated to the toxic properties of its host plant.
