= Chloroselas azurea =

Scientific classification
- Domain: Eukaryota
- Kingdom: Animalia
- Phylum: Arthropoda
- Class: Insecta
- Order: Lepidoptera
- Family: Lycaenidae
- Genus: Chloroselas
- Species: C. azurea

Binomial name
- Chloroselas azurea Butler, 1900

Species of butterfly

Chloroselas azurea, the azure gem, is a butterfly in the family Lycaenidae. It is found in central and eastern Kenya and north-eastern Tanzania. The habitat consists of dry savanna.
