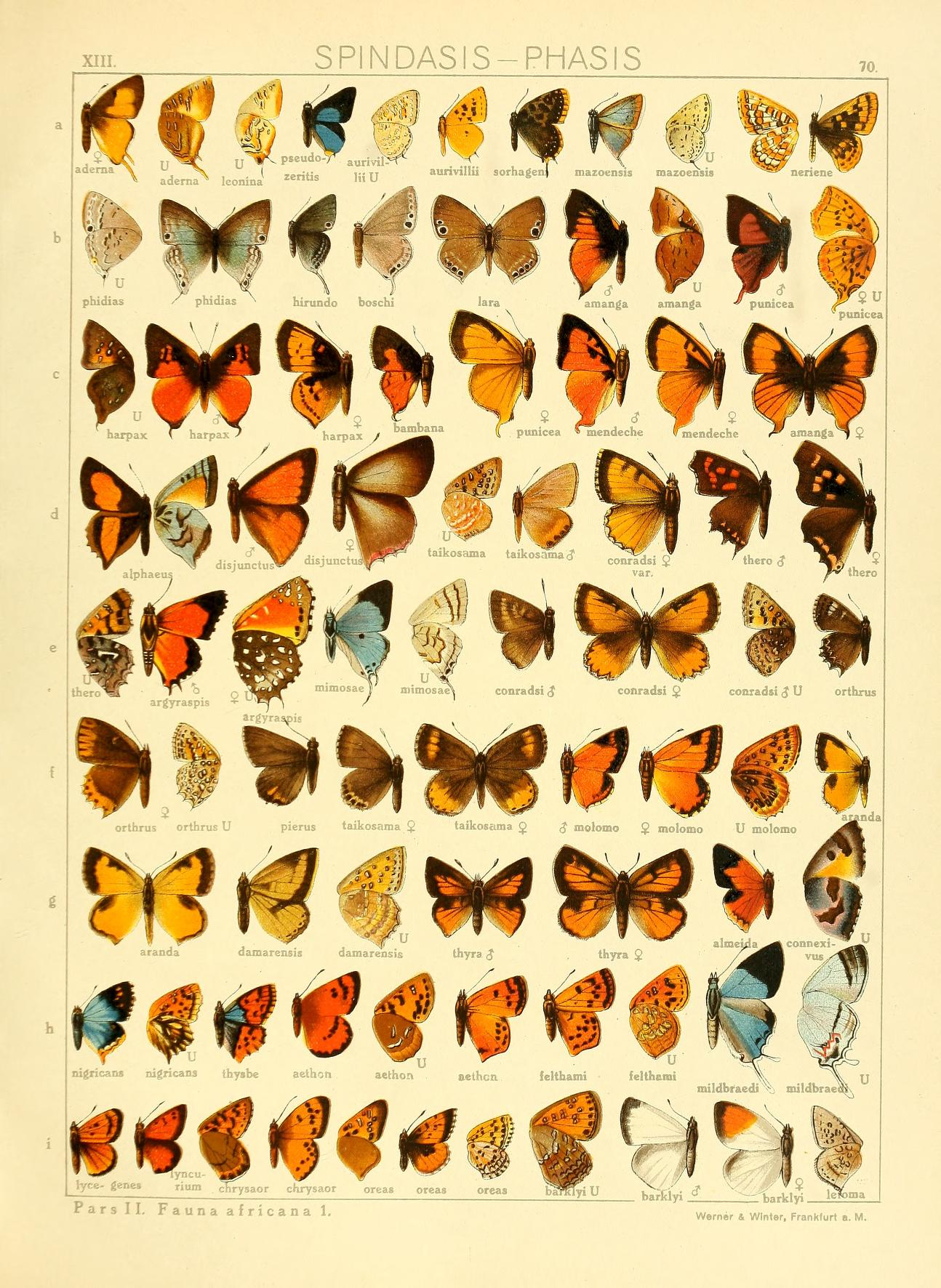

Scientific classification
- Domain: Eukaryota
- Kingdom: Animalia
- Phylum: Arthropoda
- Class: Insecta
- Order: Lepidoptera
- Family: Lycaenidae
- Genus: Chloroselas
- Species: C. pseudozeritis

Binomial name
- Chloroselas pseudozeritis (Trimen, 1873)

Synonyms
- Aphnaeus pseudo-zeritis Trimen, 1873; Chloroselas pseudozeritis tytleri f. umbrosa Talbot, 1935

= Chloroselas pseudozeritis =

Brilliant gem

Species of butterfly

Chloroselas pseudozeritis, the brilliant gem, is a butterfly of the family Lycaenidae. It is found in southern Africa.

The wingspan is 20–24 mm for males and females. Adults are on wing year-round with peaks from September to November and from March to May.

The larvae feed on Acacia species and Julbernardia globiflora. The larvae are known to live in tunnels in twigs of Julbernardia globiflora.
