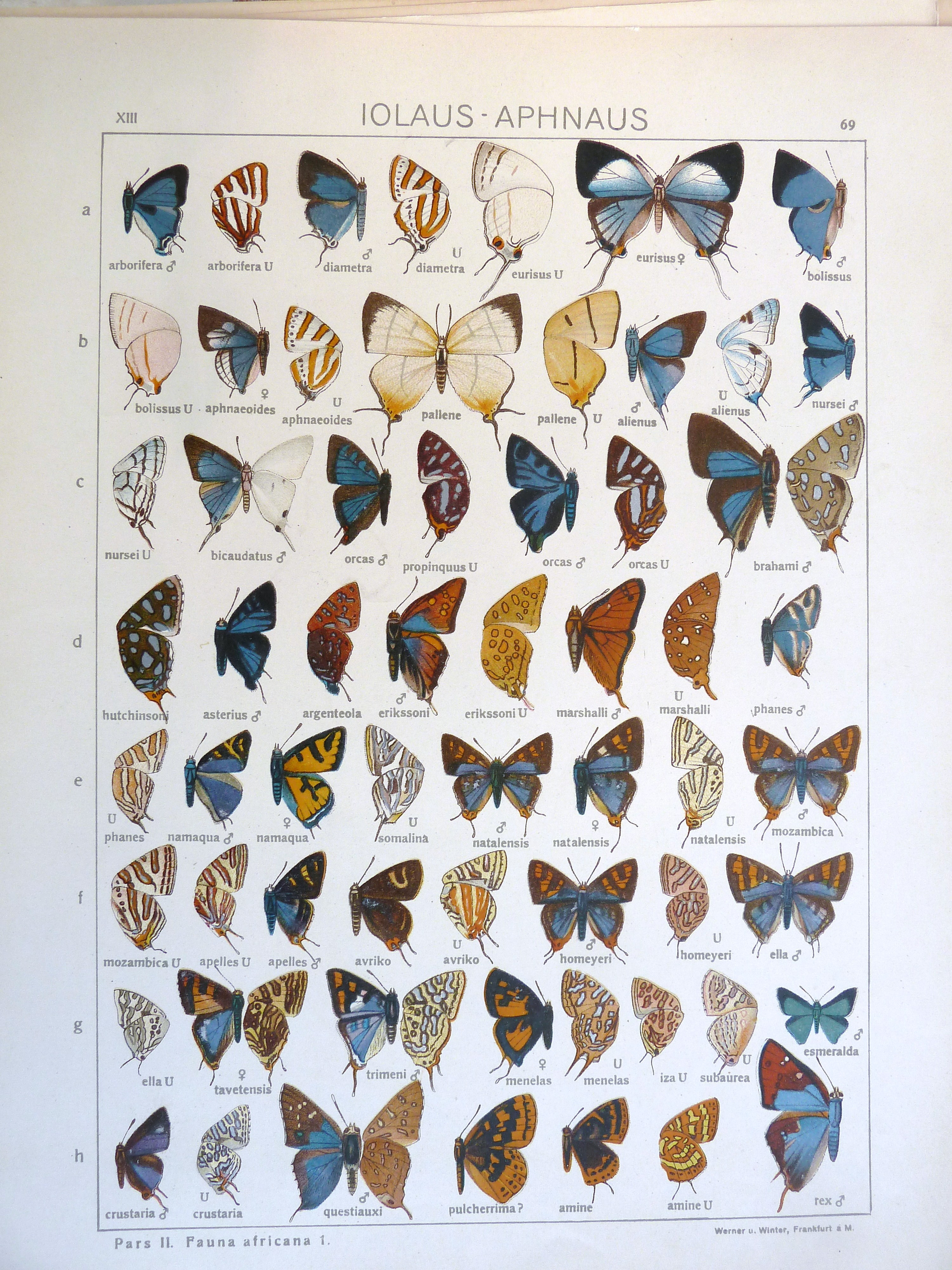
- Seitz Fauna AfricanaTaf 69 (line d)

Scientific classification
- Domain: Eukaryota
- Kingdom: Animalia
- Phylum: Arthropoda
- Class: Insecta
- Order: Lepidoptera
- Family: Lycaenidae
- Genus: Aphnaeus
- Species: A. asterius

Binomial name
- Aphnaeus asterius Plötz, 1880

Synonyms
- Aphnaeus chalybeatus Sharpe, 1890; Aphnaeus ilogo Holland, 1890; Aphnaeus argenteola Holland, 1890

= Aphnaeus asterius =

Species of butterfly

Aphnaeus asterius, the brick silver spot, is a butterfly in the family Lycaenidae. It is found in Sierra Leone, Ivory Coast, Ghana, southern Nigeria, Cameroon, Gabon, the Republic of the Congo, the Central African Republic and the Democratic Republic of the Congo (Équateur and Sankuru). The habitat consists of primary forests.
