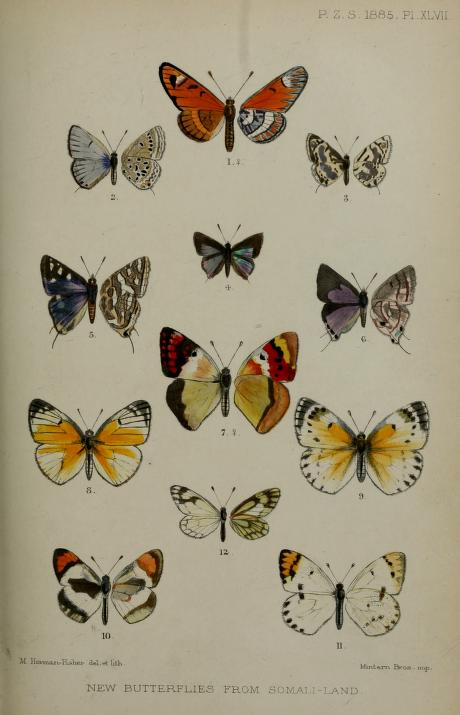
- Chloroselas figure 4

Scientific classification
- Domain: Eukaryota
- Kingdom: Animalia
- Phylum: Arthropoda
- Class: Insecta
- Order: Lepidoptera
- Family: Lycaenidae
- Subfamily: Aphnaeinae
- Genus: Chloroselas; Butler, [1886]

Synonyms
- Desmolycaena Trimen, 1898

= Chloroselas =

Butterfly genus in family Lycaenidae

Chloroselas is a genus of butterflies in the family Lycaenidae. The species of this genus are found in the Afrotropical realm.

== Species ==
- Chloroselas arabica (Riley, 1932)
- Chloroselas argentea Riley, 1932
- Chloroselas azurea Butler, 1900
- Chloroselas esmeralda Butler, [1886]
- Chloroselas mazoensis (Trimen, 1898)
- Chloroselas minima Jackson, 1966
- Chloroselas ogadenensis Jackson, 1966
- Chloroselas overlaeti Stempffer, 1956
- Chloroselas pseudozeritis (Trimen, 1873)
- Chloroselas tamaniba (Walker, 1870)
- Chloroselas taposana Riley, 1932
- Chloroselas trembathi Collins & Larsen, 1991
- Chloroselas vansomereni Jackson, 1966
