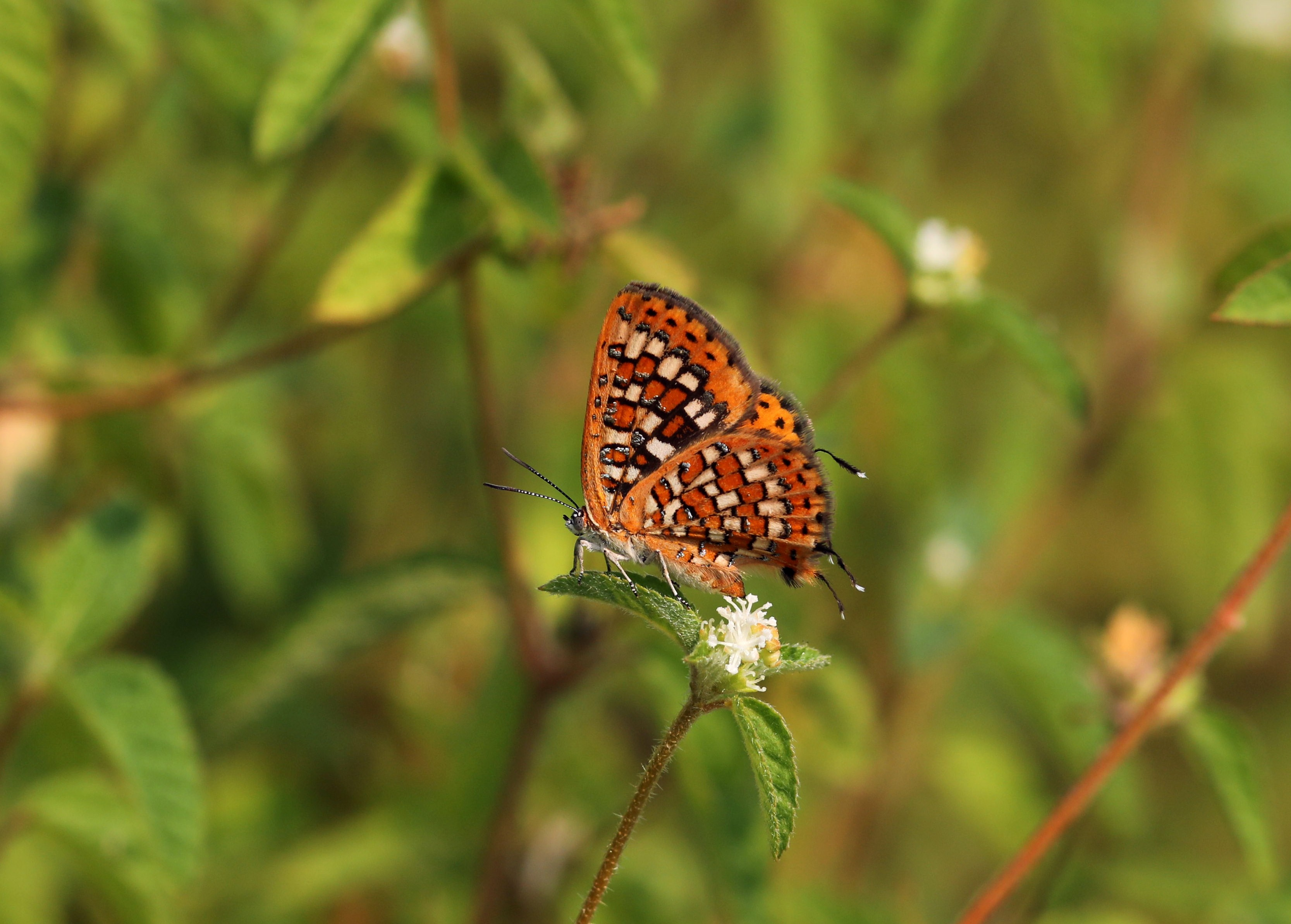

Scientific classification
- Kingdom: Animalia
- Phylum: Arthropoda
- Clade: Pancrustacea
- Class: Insecta
- Order: Lepidoptera
- Family: Lycaenidae
- Genus: Zeritis
- Species: Z. neriene

Binomial name
- Zeritis neriene Boisduval, 1836

Synonyms
- Cigaritis amine Butler, 1874; Zeritis neriene f. muzizii Bethune-Baker, 1924

= Zeritis neriene =

Species of butterfly

Zeritis neriene, the checkered gem, is a butterfly in the family Lycaenidae. It is found in Senegal, The Gambia, Guinea, Burkina Faso, Sierra Leone, Ivory Coast, Ghana, Benin, Nigeria, southern Niger, Cameroon, the Central African Republic, southern Sudan, Uganda, and western Kenya. The habitat consists of savanna, where it is found on sandy soils and open stony ground with short grass.

Adults feed from small, white, low-growing flowers.

Torben Larsen developed a species numbering system for his 2005 publication Butterflies of West Africa. This species is #374. The 'Larsen' numbers have since been used with permission in A Sharp Eye on Butterflies of Ghana.
