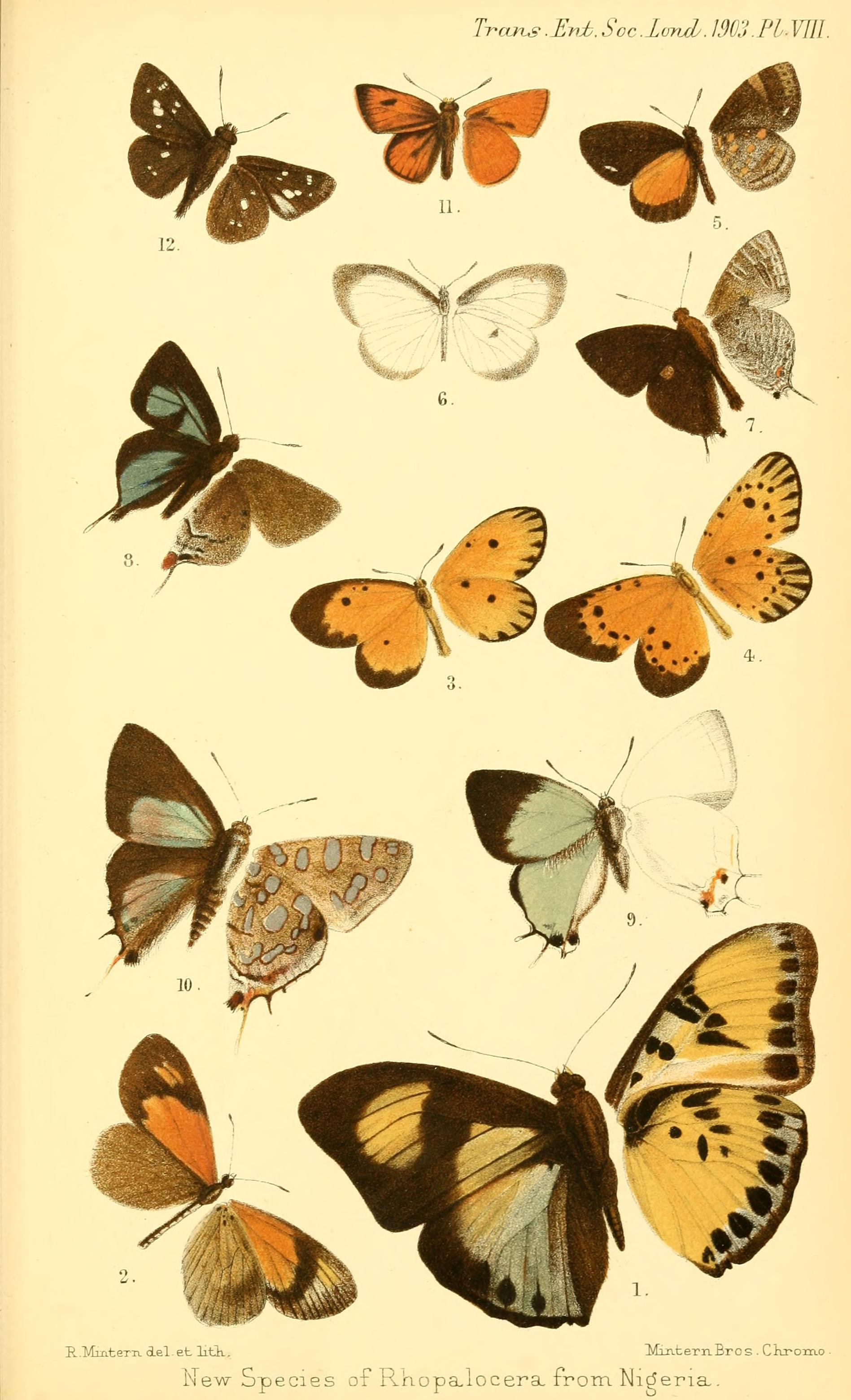
- Figure 10

Scientific classification
- Domain: Eukaryota
- Kingdom: Animalia
- Phylum: Arthropoda
- Class: Insecta
- Order: Lepidoptera
- Family: Lycaenidae
- Genus: Aphnaeus
- Species: A. brahami

Binomial name
- Aphnaeus brahami Lathy, 1903

= Aphnaeus brahami =

Western silver spot

Species of butterfly

Aphnaeus brahami, the western silver spot, is a butterfly in the family Lycaenidae. It is found in Senegal, Burkina Faso, Ghana (the Volta Region), Benin and Nigeria. The habitat consists of the Guinea/Sudan savanna transition zone.

The former species Aphnaeus coronae, found in Sudan, Uganda and Kenya, is now included in A. brahami.

== Subspecies ==
- Aphnaeus brahami brahami
- Aphnaeus brahami ghanaensis Libert, 2013
- Aphnaeus brahami bakeri Libert, 2013
- Aphnaeus brahami coronae Talbot, 1935 (the crowned highflier or crown silver spot) — southern Sudan, northern Uganda
- Aphnaeus brahami littoralis Carcasson, 1964 — Kenya: coast to the area north of Mombasa
