= Aphnaeus flavescens =

Scientific classification
- Domain: Eukaryota
- Kingdom: Animalia
- Phylum: Arthropoda
- Class: Insecta
- Order: Lepidoptera
- Family: Lycaenidae
- Genus: Aphnaeus
- Species: A. flavescens

Binomial name
- Aphnaeus flavescens Stempffer, 1954

Species of butterfly

Aphnaeus flavescens, the creamy highflier, is a butterfly in the family Lycaenidae. It is found in Malawi and Zambia.
