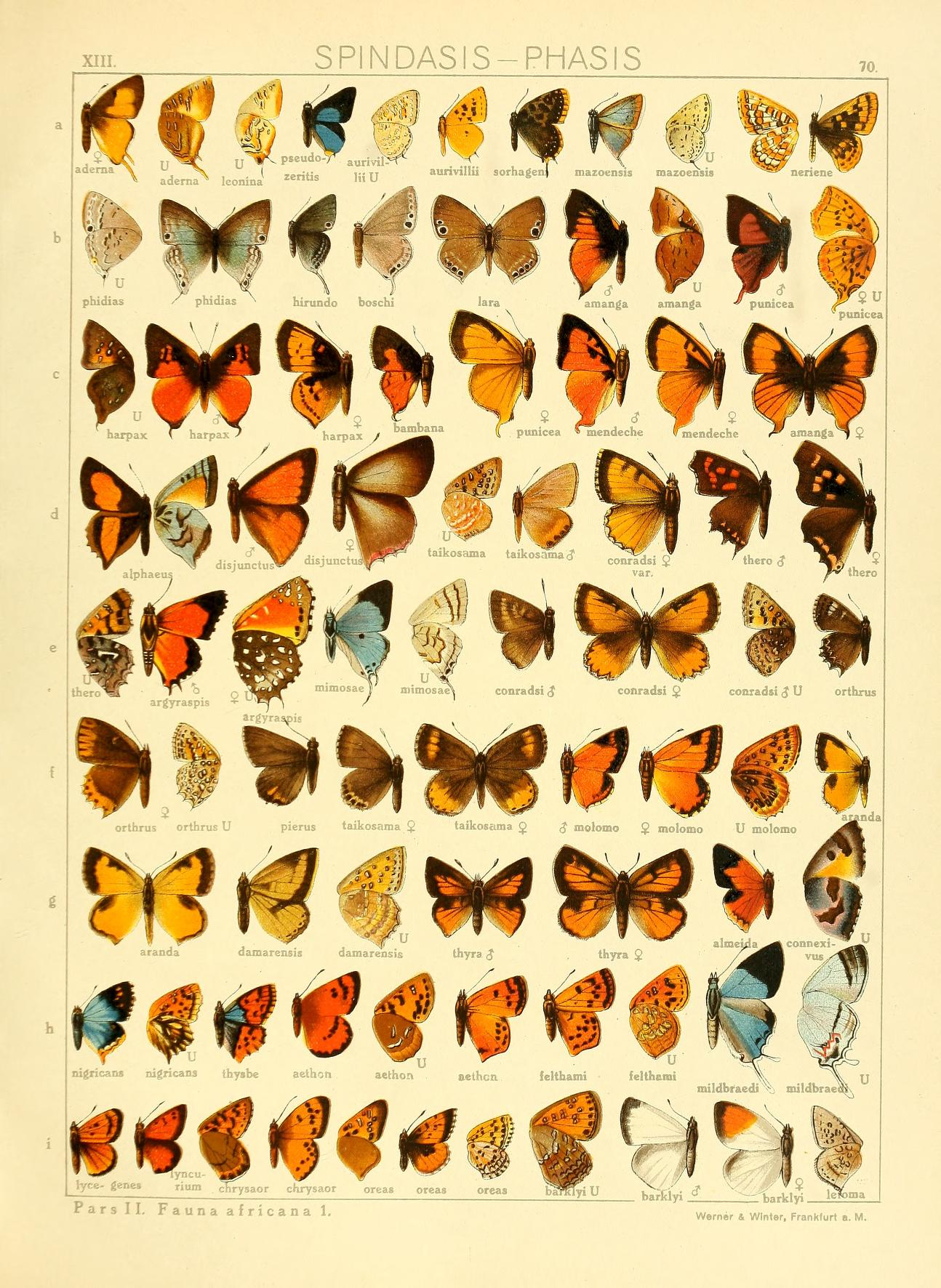

Scientific classification
- Kingdom: Animalia
- Phylum: Arthropoda
- Class: Insecta
- Order: Lepidoptera
- Family: Lycaenidae
- Genus: Zeritis
- Species: Z. aurivillii

Binomial name
- Zeritis aurivillii Schultze, 1908

= Zeritis aurivillii =

Species of butterfly

Zeritis aurivillii is a butterfly in the family Lycaenidae. It is found in Cameroon.
