= Vansomerenia =

Scientific classification
- Kingdom: Animalia
- Phylum: Arthropoda
- Class: Insecta
- Order: Lepidoptera
- Family: Lycaenidae
- Subfamily: Aphnaeinae
- Genus: Vansomerenia; Heath, 1997
- Species: V. rogersi

Binomial name
- Vansomerenia rogersi (Riley, 1932)

Synonyms
- Desmolycaena rogersi Riley, 1932

Genus of butterflies

Vansomerenia is a genus of butterflies in the family Lycaenidae. It contains only one species, Vansomerenia rogersi or Rogers’ gem, which is found in central Kenya and northern Tanzania. The habitat consists of savanna.

Adults are attracted to flowers.
