= Aphnaeus nyanzae =

Scientific classification
- Domain: Eukaryota
- Kingdom: Animalia
- Phylum: Arthropoda
- Class: Insecta
- Order: Lepidoptera
- Family: Lycaenidae
- Genus: Aphnaeus
- Species: A. nyanzae

Binomial name
- Aphnaeus nyanzae Stempffer, 1954

Species of butterfly

Aphnaeus nyanzae is a butterfly in the family Lycaenidae. It is found in Uganda.
