= Aphnaeus gilloni =

Scientific classification
- Domain: Eukaryota
- Kingdom: Animalia
- Phylum: Arthropoda
- Class: Insecta
- Order: Lepidoptera
- Family: Lycaenidae
- Genus: Aphnaeus
- Species: A. gilloni

Binomial name
- Aphnaeus gilloni Stempffer, 1966

Species of butterfly

Aphnaeus gilloni, the red silver spot, is a butterfly in the family Lycaenidae. It is found in Ivory Coast, Ghana (the Volta Region), Cameroon and possibly Uganda.
