= Zeritis fontainei =

Scientific classification
- Kingdom: Animalia
- Phylum: Arthropoda
- Class: Insecta
- Order: Lepidoptera
- Family: Lycaenidae
- Genus: Zeritis
- Species: Z. fontainei

Binomial name
- Zeritis fontainei Stempffer, 1956

Species of butterfly

Zeritis fontainei is a butterfly in the family Lycaenidae. It is found in the Democratic Republic of the Congo and Zambia.
