= Aphnaeus herbuloti =

Scientific classification
- Domain: Eukaryota
- Kingdom: Animalia
- Phylum: Arthropoda
- Class: Insecta
- Order: Lepidoptera
- Family: Lycaenidae
- Genus: Aphnaeus
- Species: A. herbuloti

Binomial name
- Aphnaeus herbuloti Stempffer, 1971

Synonyms
- Aphnaeus carcassoni Larsen, 1986

Species of butterfly

Aphnaeus herbuloti is a butterfly in the family Lycaenidae. It is found in Cameroon and the Democratic Republic of Congo.
