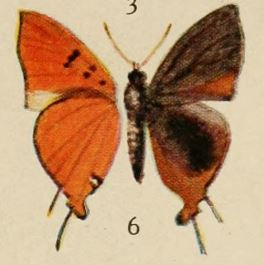

Scientific classification
- Domain: Eukaryota
- Kingdom: Animalia
- Phylum: Arthropoda
- Class: Insecta
- Order: Lepidoptera
- Family: Lycaenidae
- Genus: Aphnaeus
- Species: A. chapini

Binomial name
- Aphnaeus chapini (Holland, 1920)

Synonyms
- Spindasis chapini Holland, 1920; Aphnaeus asterius ugandae Stempffer, 1961

= Aphnaeus chapini =

Species of butterfly

Aphnaeus chapini is a butterfly in the family Lycaenidae. It is found in Cameroon, the Republic of Congo, the Democratic Republic of Congo and Uganda.

== Subspecies ==
- Aphnaeus chapini chapini (Democratic Republic of Congo: Uele)
- Aphnaeus chapini occidentalis Clench, 1963 (Cameroon, Congo)
- Aphnaeus chapini ugandae Stempffer, 1961 (Uganda)
