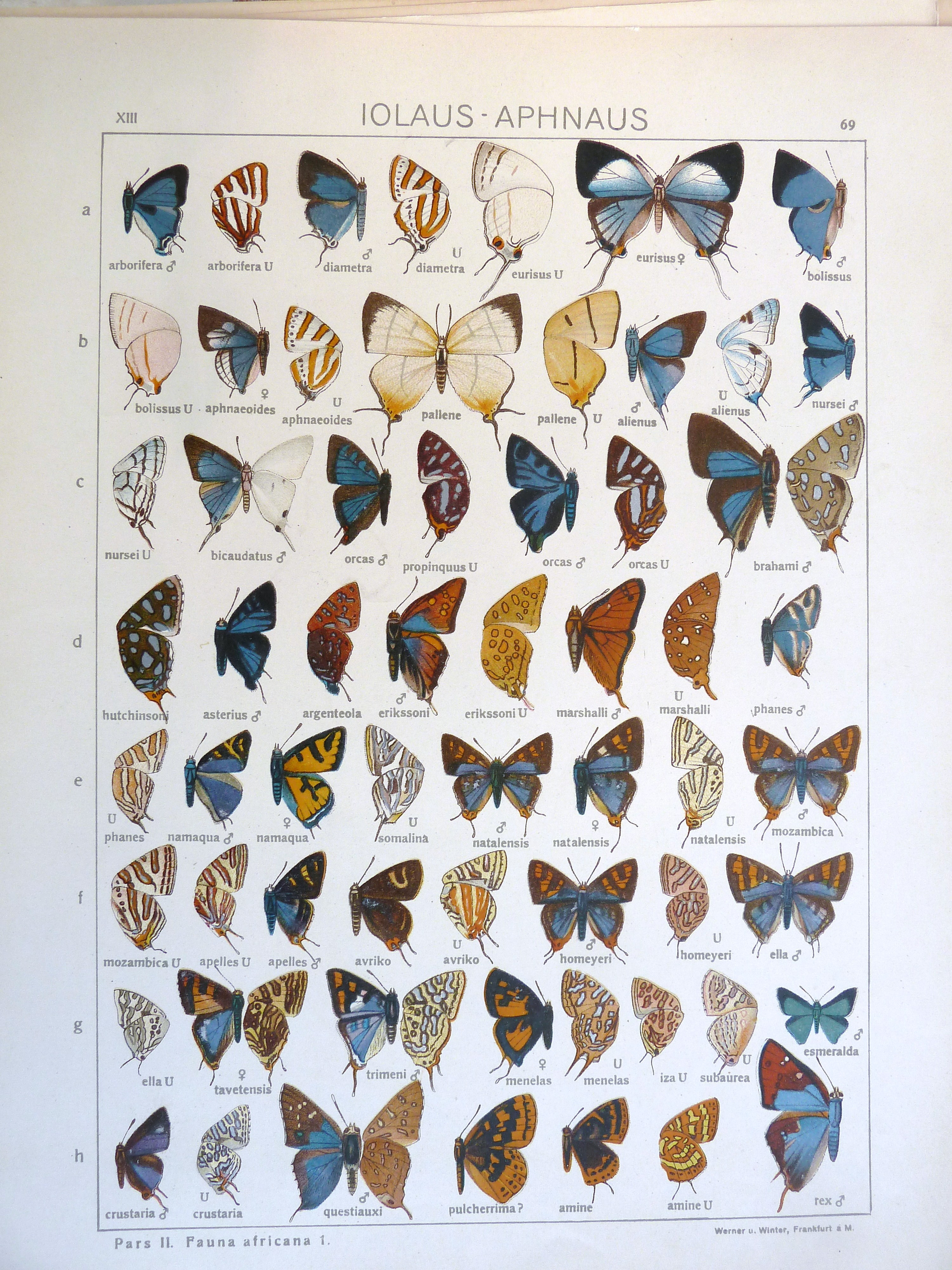
- Seitz FaunaAfricana Taf 69 (line h)

Scientific classification
- Kingdom: Animalia
- Phylum: Arthropoda
- Class: Insecta
- Order: Lepidoptera
- Family: Lycaenidae
- Genus: Zeritis
- Species: Z. pulcherrima

Binomial name
- Zeritis pulcherrima Aurivillius, 1923

= Zeritis pulcherrima =

Species of butterfly

Zeritis pulcherrima is a butterfly in the family Lycaenidae. It is found in Sudan and the Central African Republic.
