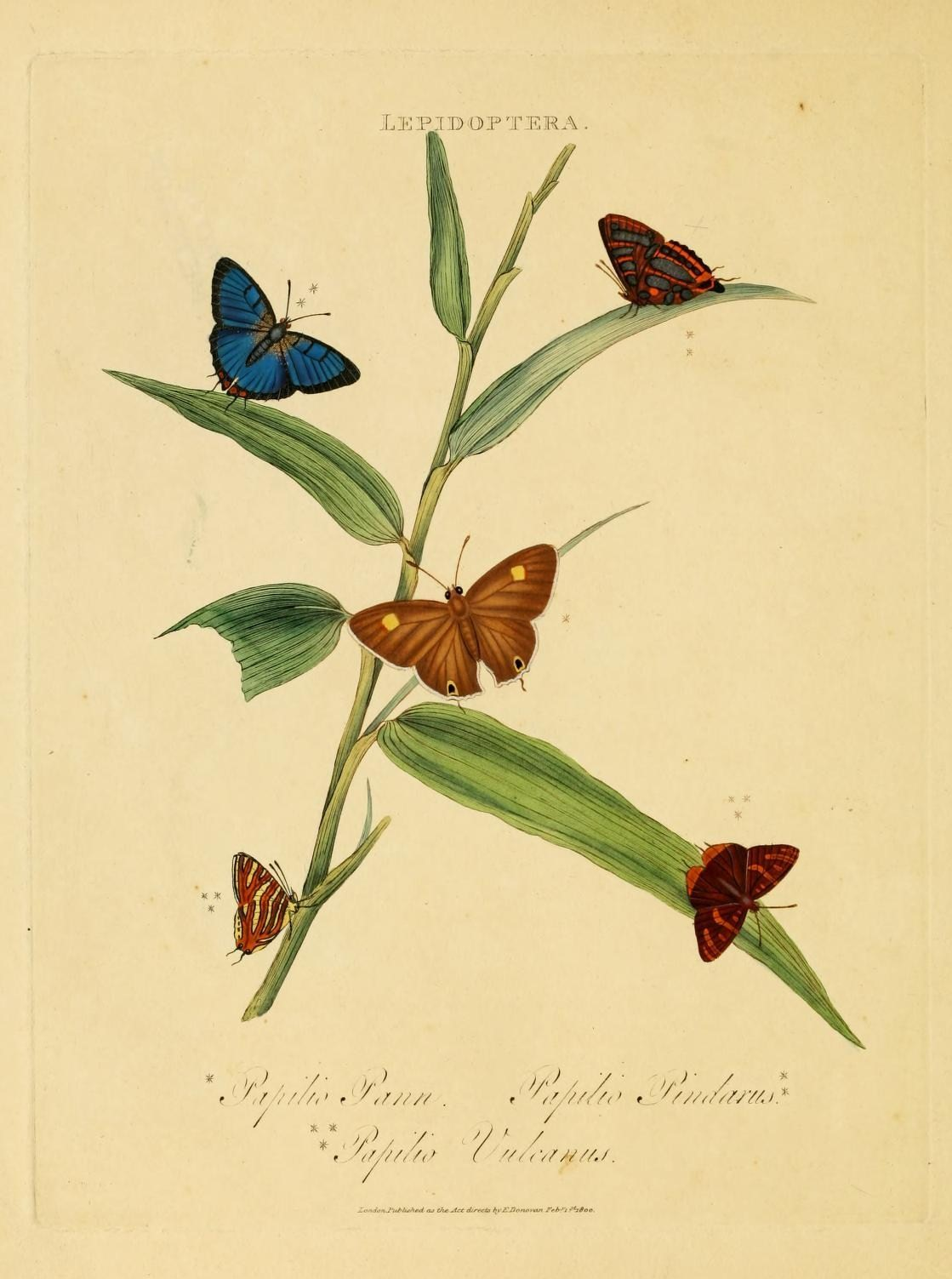

Scientific classification
- Kingdom: Animalia
- Phylum: Arthropoda
- Clade: Pancrustacea
- Class: Insecta
- Order: Lepidoptera
- Family: Lycaenidae
- Genus: Aphnaeus
- Species: A. orcas

Binomial name
- Aphnaeus orcas (Drury, 1782)

Synonyms
- Papilio orcas Drury, 1782; Aphnaeus guttatus Plötz, 1880; Aphnaeus hollandi Butler, 1902; Aphnaeus rattrayi Sharpe, 1904; Aphnaeus orcas var. heliodorus Schultze, 1916; Aphnaeus orcas f. overlaeti Berger, 1953; Aphnaeus orcas f. fontainei Berger, 1953; Aphnaeus orcas f. paupera Stempffer, 1954

= Aphnaeus orcas =

Species of butterfly

Aphnaeus orcas, the common highflier or common silver spot, is a butterfly in the family Lycaenidae. It is found in Senegal, the Gambia, Guinea-Bissau, Guinea, Sierra Leone, Liberia, Ivory Coast, Ghana, Nigeria (south and the Cross River loop), Cameroon, Gabon, the Republic of the Congo, Angola, the Central African Republic, the Democratic Republic of the Congo (Mongala, Uele, Tshopo, Tshuapa, Equateur, Sankuru and Lualaba), Uganda, western and south-western Kenya, Tanzania and Zambia. The habitat consists of forests.

Both sexes feed from flowers and males mud-puddle.

The larvae feed on Alchornea cordifolia, Albizia, Allophylus, Blighia, Loranthus, Macaranga, Olea, Paullinia, Rhus, Scolopia, Scutia and Uncaria species. They are attended by ants of the family Formicidae.

Torben Larsen developed a species numbering system for his 2005 publication Butterflies of West Africa. This species is #361. The 'Larsen' numbers have since been used with permission in A Sharp Eye on Butterflies of Ghana.
