= Chloroselas overlaeti =

Scientific classification
- Domain: Eukaryota
- Kingdom: Animalia
- Phylum: Arthropoda
- Class: Insecta
- Order: Lepidoptera
- Family: Lycaenidae
- Genus: Chloroselas
- Species: C. overlaeti

Binomial name
- Chloroselas overlaeti Stempffer, 1956

Species of butterfly

Chloroselas overlaeti is a butterfly in the family Lycaenidae. It is found in the Democratic Republic of the Congo (from the south-eastern part of the country to Lualaba), Zambia and Tanzania (from the western part of the country to Mpanda and Kigoma).
