= Aphnaeus adamsi =

Scientific classification
- Domain: Eukaryota
- Kingdom: Animalia
- Phylum: Arthropoda
- Class: Insecta
- Order: Lepidoptera
- Family: Lycaenidae
- Genus: Aphnaeus
- Species: A. adamsi

Binomial name
- Aphnaeus adamsi Stempffer, 1954

Species of butterfly

Aphnaeus adamsi is a butterfly in the family Lycaenidae. It is found in Cameroon and the south-central part of the Democratic Republic of Congo.
