= Crudaria wykehami =

Wykeham's grey

Scientific classification
- Domain: Eukaryota
- Kingdom: Animalia
- Phylum: Arthropoda
- Class: Insecta
- Order: Lepidoptera
- Family: Lycaenidae
- Genus: Crudaria
- Species: C. wykehami

Binomial name
- Crudaria wykehami Dickson, 1983

Species of butterfly

Crudaria wykehami, the Wykeham's grey, is a butterfly of the family Lycaenidae. It is found only in South Africa's Northern Cape.

The wingspan is 20–32 mm for males and 25–34 mm for females. Adults fly year-round particularly from November to February.

The larvae probably feed on Acacia karroo.
