= Chloroselas vansomereni =

Scientific classification
- Domain: Eukaryota
- Kingdom: Animalia
- Phylum: Arthropoda
- Class: Insecta
- Order: Lepidoptera
- Family: Lycaenidae
- Genus: Chloroselas
- Species: C. vansomereni

Binomial name
- Chloroselas vansomereni Jackson, 1966

Species of butterfly

Chloroselas vansomereni, the Van Someren's gem, is a butterfly in the family Lycaenidae. It is found in Kenya (the Tana River).
