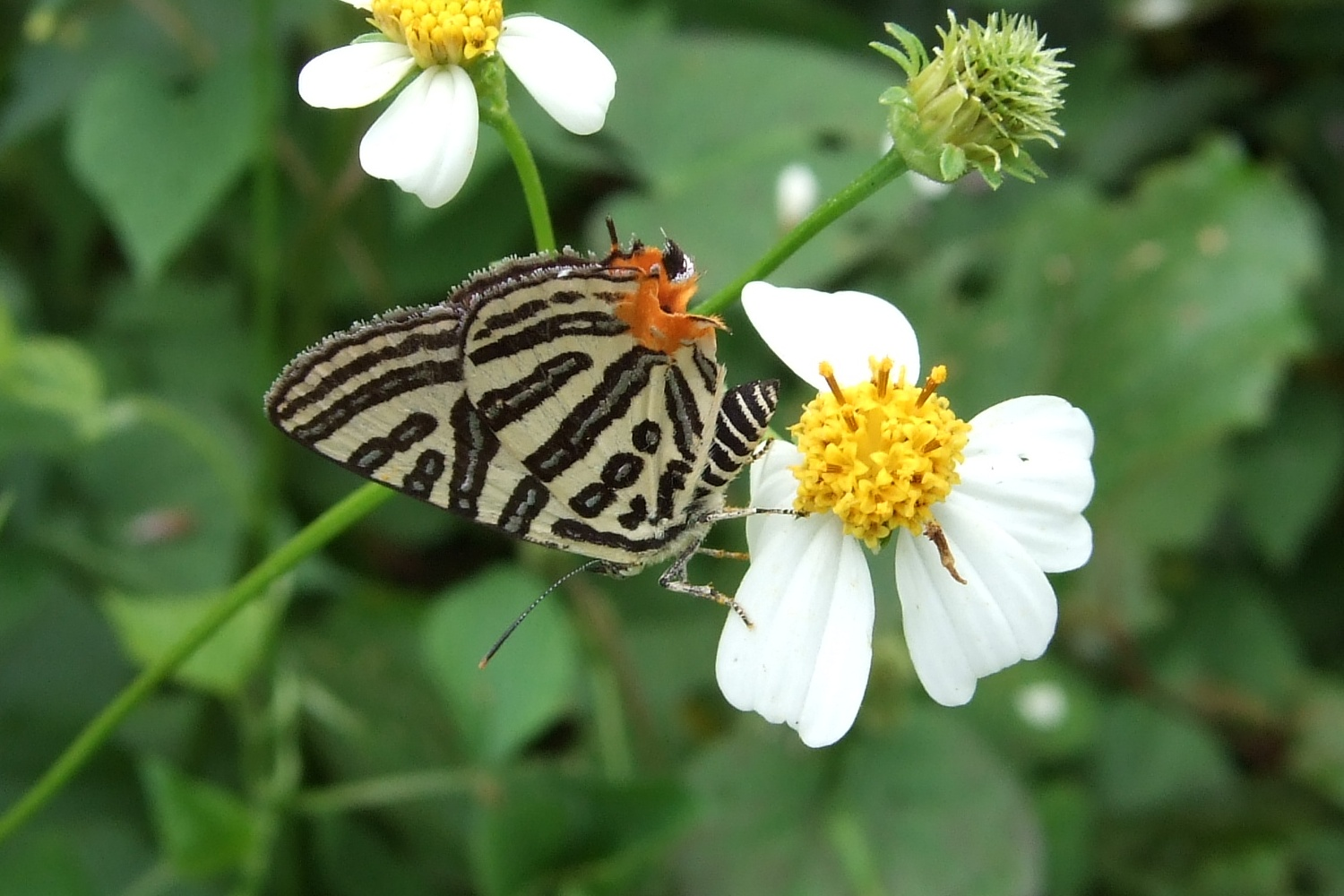
- Club silverline, Cigaritis syama

Scientific classification
- Kingdom: Animalia
- Phylum: Arthropoda
- Clade: Pancrustacea
- Class: Insecta
- Order: Lepidoptera
- Family: Lycaenidae
- Subfamily: Aphnaeinae; Distant, 1884

= Aphnaeinae =

Subfamily of butterflies

The Aphnaeinae are a subfamily of butterflies in the family Lycaenidae.

== Systematics ==
Until recently, this taxon used to be considered a tribe (called Aphnaeini) within the subfamily Theclinae.

== History ==
The Aphnaeinae is known as a Afrotropical and Oriental species that comes from a subfamily of 278 described species. What makes them distinct is that they have ants that work mutualistic with this organism for the reason that ants defend the larvae from predators and the larvae give production of high nutrients to the ants. What makes Aphnaeinae to stand out among the Lycaenidae is “for exhibiting considerable variability in feeding strategies within a single subfamily, especially considering the relatively small size of the group” (Boyle et al., 2015).

== Genera ==
Modern authors recognize 17 genera:

- Aloeides Hübner, [1819]
- Aphnaeus Hübner, [1819]
- Argyraspodes Tite & Dickson, 1973
- Axiocerses Hübner, [1819]
- Cesa Seven, 1997
- Chloroselas Butler, [1886]
- Chrysoritis Butler, [1898]
- Cigaritis Donzel, 1847
- Crudaria Wallengren, 1875
- Erikssonia Trimen, 1891
- Lipaphnaeus Aurivillius, 1916
- Phasis Hübner, [1819]
- Pseudaletis Druce, 1888
- Trimenia Tite & Dickson, 1973
- Tylopaedia Tite & Dickson, 1973
- Vansomerenia Heath, 1997
- Zeritis Boisduval, [1836]
