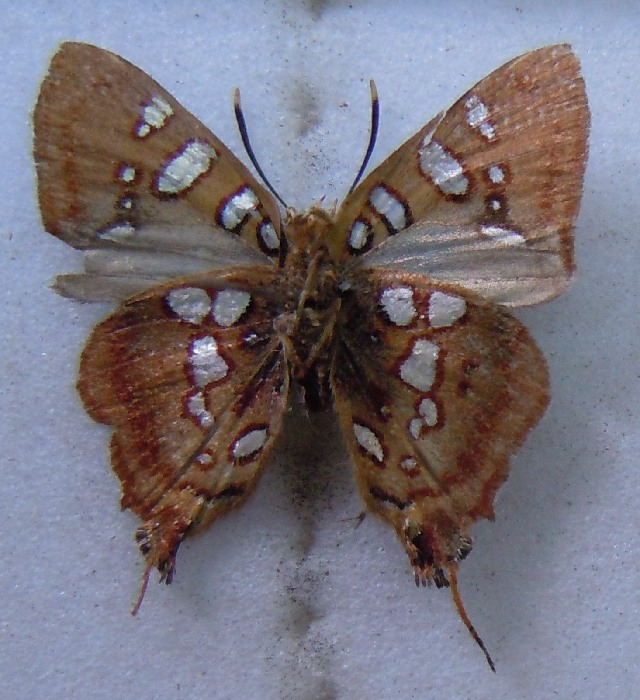

Scientific classification
- Domain: Eukaryota
- Kingdom: Animalia
- Phylum: Arthropoda
- Class: Insecta
- Order: Lepidoptera
- Family: Lycaenidae
- Genus: Aphnaeus
- Species: A. marci

Binomial name
- Aphnaeus marci Collins & Larsen, 2008

= Aphnaeus marci =

Species of butterfly

Aphnaeus marci (Note: The ⟨c⟩ is pronounced as a [k]: "with a hard c" (Collins & Larsen 2008, p. 68).) is a butterfly in the family Lycaenidae. It is found in Cameroon.
