= Aphnaeus charboneli =

Scientific classification
- Domain: Eukaryota
- Kingdom: Animalia
- Phylum: Arthropoda
- Class: Insecta
- Order: Lepidoptera
- Family: Lycaenidae
- Genus: Aphnaeus
- Species: A. charboneli

Binomial name
- Aphnaeus charboneli Bouyer & Libert, 1996

Species of butterfly

Aphnaeus charboneli, the Charbonel's silver spot, is a butterfly in the family Lycaenidae. It is found in Ghana, Cameroon and the Democratic Republic of the Congo. The habitat consists of upland evergreen forests and forests at sea level.
