= Chloroselas taposana =

Scientific classification
- Domain: Eukaryota
- Kingdom: Animalia
- Phylum: Arthropoda
- Class: Insecta
- Order: Lepidoptera
- Family: Lycaenidae
- Genus: Chloroselas
- Species: C. taposana

Binomial name
- Chloroselas taposana Riley, 1932

Species of butterfly

Chloroselas taposana is a butterfly in the family Lycaenidae. It is found in South Sudan.
