= Chloroselas tamaniba =

Scientific classification
- Domain: Eukaryota
- Kingdom: Animalia
- Phylum: Arthropoda
- Class: Insecta
- Order: Lepidoptera
- Family: Lycaenidae
- Genus: Chloroselas
- Species: C. tamaniba

Binomial name
- Chloroselas tamaniba (Walker, 1870)

Synonyms
- Aphnaeus tamaniba Walker, 1870

Species of butterfly

Chloroselas tamaniba is a Butterfly in the family Lycaenidae. It is found in Sudan.

== Taxonomy ==
The type is lost and the identity of this species is unclear. It might be a nomen dubium.
