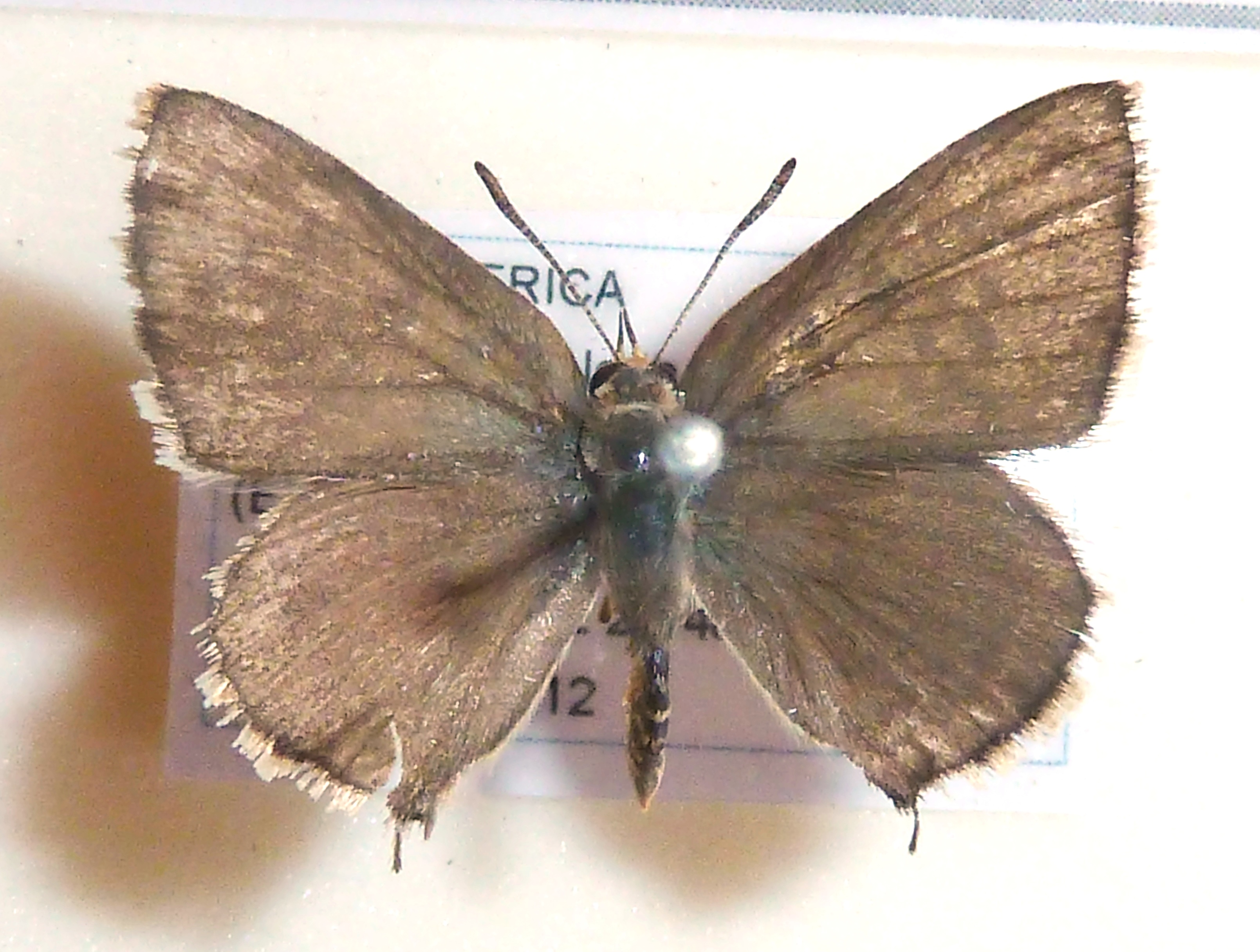

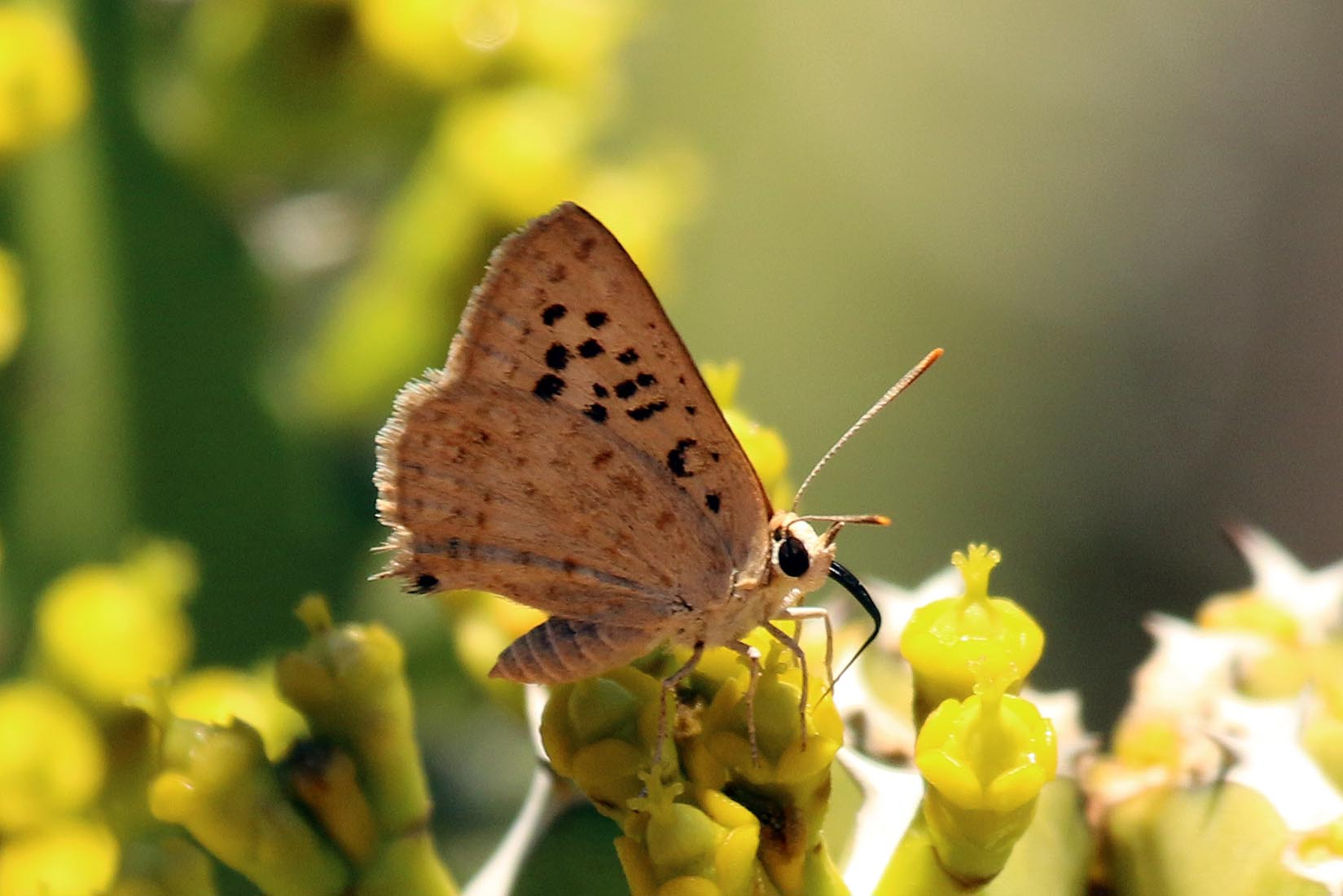
- Male, Tswalu Kalahari Reserve, South Africa

Scientific classification
- Domain: Eukaryota
- Kingdom: Animalia
- Phylum: Arthropoda
- Class: Insecta
- Order: Lepidoptera
- Family: Lycaenidae
- Genus: Crudaria
- Species: C. leroma

Binomial name
- Crudaria leroma (Wallengren, 1857)

Synonyms
- Arhopala leroma Wallengren, 1857; Zeritis zorites Hewitson, 1874; Cigaritis delagoensis Sharpe, 1891; Crudaria leroma f. albomaculata Aurivillius, 1923

= Crudaria leroma =

Silver-spotted grey

Species of butterfly

Crudaria leroma, the silver-spotted grey, is a butterfly of the family Lycaenidae. It is found in south-western Africa, including Zimbabwe, Mozambique, Botswana and South Africa. In South Africa, it is found from the Western to the Eastern and Northern Cape, KwaZulu-Natal, the Free State, Mpumalanga, Limpopo, North West and Gauteng provinces.

The wingspan is 20–32 mm for males and 25–34 mm for females. Adults are on wing year-round in warmer areas and from October to March in cooler areas.

The larvae feed on Acacia karroo, A. sieberana, and Elephantorrhiza burkei.
