= Chloroselas argentea =

Scientific classification
- Domain: Eukaryota
- Kingdom: Animalia
- Phylum: Arthropoda
- Class: Insecta
- Order: Lepidoptera
- Family: Lycaenidae
- Genus: Chloroselas
- Species: C. argentea

Binomial name
- Chloroselas argentea Riley, 1932

Species of butterfly

Chloroselas argentea, the silver gem, is a butterfly in the family Lycaenidae. It is found in Zimbabwe (the Mutare and Harare districts). The habitat consists of Brachystegia woodland.

Adults are on wing from October to April.

The larvae feed on Brachystegia spiciformis and possibly Acacia species.
