= Chloroselas minima =

Scientific classification
- Domain: Eukaryota
- Kingdom: Animalia
- Phylum: Arthropoda
- Class: Insecta
- Order: Lepidoptera
- Family: Lycaenidae
- Genus: Chloroselas
- Species: C. minima

Binomial name
- Chloroselas minima Jackson, 1966

Species of butterfly

Chloroselas minima, the tiny gem, is a butterfly in the family Lycaenidae. It is found in central Kenya and along the coast and along the northern coast of Tanzania. The habitat consists of arid savanna.

Adults have been recorded feeding from flowers in open grassland.
