= Zeritis krystyna =

Scientific classification
- Kingdom: Animalia
- Phylum: Arthropoda
- Clade: Pancrustacea
- Class: Insecta
- Order: Lepidoptera
- Family: Lycaenidae
- Genus: Zeritis
- Species: Z. krystyna

Binomial name
- Zeritis krystyna d'Abrera, 1980

Species of butterfly

Zeritis krystyna is a butterfly in the family Lycaenidae. It is found in central Angola.
