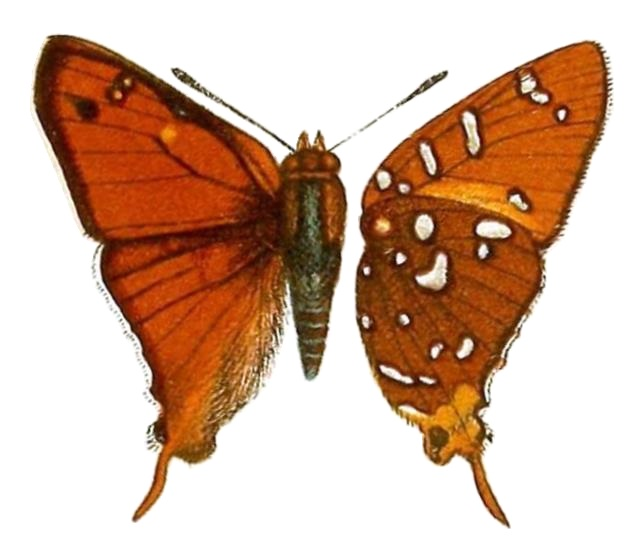
- male

Scientific classification
- Domain: Eukaryota
- Kingdom: Animalia
- Phylum: Arthropoda
- Class: Insecta
- Order: Lepidoptera
- Family: Lycaenidae
- Genus: Aphnaeus
- Species: A. marshalli

Binomial name
- Aphnaeus marshalli Neave, 1910

= Aphnaeus marshalli =

Marshall's highflier

Species of butterfly

Aphnaeus marshalli, the Marshall's highflier, is a butterfly in the family Lycaenidae. It is found in Tanzania (from the south-western part of the country to Kigoma), the Democratic Republic of the Congo (from the south-eastern part of the country to Katanga Province), Zambia and north-eastern Zimbabwe. The habitat consists of Brachystegia woodland.

Both sexes mud-puddle. Adults are on wing in September and October.

The larvae feed on Julbernardia globiflora and Brachystegia boehmii.
