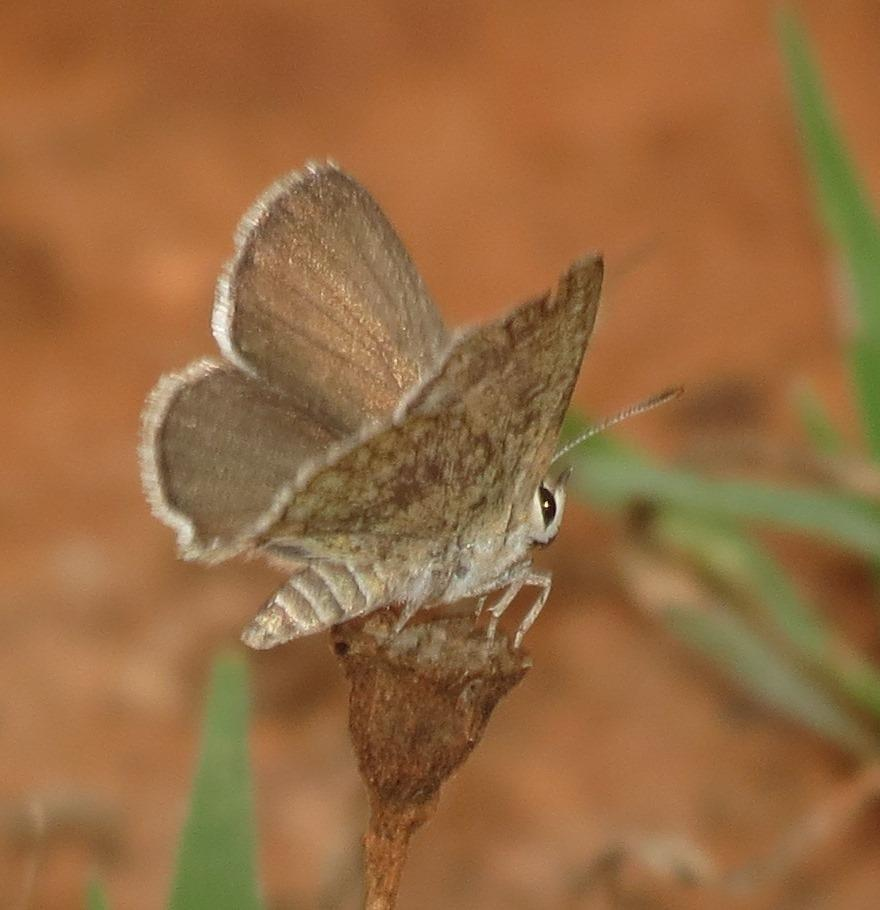

Scientific classification
- Domain: Eukaryota
- Kingdom: Animalia
- Phylum: Arthropoda
- Class: Insecta
- Order: Lepidoptera
- Family: Lycaenidae
- Genus: Crudaria
- Species: C. capensis

Binomial name
- Crudaria capensis van Son, 1956

= Crudaria capensis =

Species of butterfly

Crudaria capensis, the Cape grey, is a butterfly of the family Lycaenidae. It is found in South Africa, in the provinces of Western, Eastern, and Northern Cape.

The wingspan is 20–32 mm for males and 25–34 mm for females. Adults are on wing from October to December. There is one generation per year.

The larvae probably feed on Zygophyllum retrofractum.
