= Chloroselas trembathi =

Scientific classification
- Domain: Eukaryota
- Kingdom: Animalia
- Phylum: Arthropoda
- Class: Insecta
- Order: Lepidoptera
- Family: Lycaenidae
- Genus: Chloroselas
- Species: C. trembathi

Binomial name
- Chloroselas trembathi Collins & Larsen, 1991

Species of butterfly

Chloroselas trembathi is a butterfly in the family Lycaenidae. It is found in Kenya. The habitat consists of open savanna.

Adults have been recorded in December.
