= Aphnaeus jefferyi =

Scientific classification
- Domain: Eukaryota
- Kingdom: Animalia
- Phylum: Arthropoda
- Class: Insecta
- Order: Lepidoptera
- Family: Lycaenidae
- Genus: Aphnaeus
- Species: A. jefferyi

Binomial name
- Aphnaeus jefferyi Hawker-Smith, 1928

Species of butterfly

Aphnaeus jefferyi, the Jeffery's highflier or Jeffrey's silver spot, is a butterfly in the family Lycaenidae. It is found in Guinea, Sierra Leone, Ghana, Cameroon, western Kenya, Uganda (around Mount Elgon) and north-western Tanzania. The habitat consists of woodland.
