= Aphnaeus liberti =

Scientific classification
- Kingdom: Animalia
- Phylum: Arthropoda
- Class: Insecta
- Order: Lepidoptera
- Family: Lycaenidae
- Genus: Aphnaeus
- Species: A. liberti

Binomial name
- Aphnaeus liberti Bouyer, 1996

Species of butterfly

Aphnaeus liberti is a butterfly in the family Lycaenidae. It is found in Cameroon.
