= Aphnaeus neavei =

Scientific classification
- Kingdom: Animalia
- Phylum: Arthropoda
- Clade: Pancrustacea
- Class: Insecta
- Order: Lepidoptera
- Family: Lycaenidae
- Genus: Aphnaeus
- Species: A. neavei

Binomial name
- Aphnaeus neavei Bethune-Baker, 1926

Species of butterfly

Aphnaeus neavei, Neave's silver spot or Neave's highflier, is a butterfly in the family Lycaenidae. The species was first described by George Thomas Bethune-Baker in 1926 and it is found in north-eastern Kenya. The habitat consists of dry savanna at altitudes below 200 meters.
