= Aphnaeus williamsi =

Scientific classification
- Domain: Eukaryota
- Kingdom: Animalia
- Phylum: Arthropoda
- Class: Insecta
- Order: Lepidoptera
- Family: Lycaenidae
- Genus: Aphnaeus
- Species: A. williamsi

Binomial name
- Aphnaeus williamsi Carcasson, 1964

Synonyms
- Aphnaeus flavescens williamsi

Species of butterfly

Aphnaeus williamsi, the Williams' highflier, is a butterfly in the family Lycaenidae. It is found along the coast of Kenya. The habitat consists of savanna on the edges of coastal forests.

Adults have been recorded feeding from flowers.
