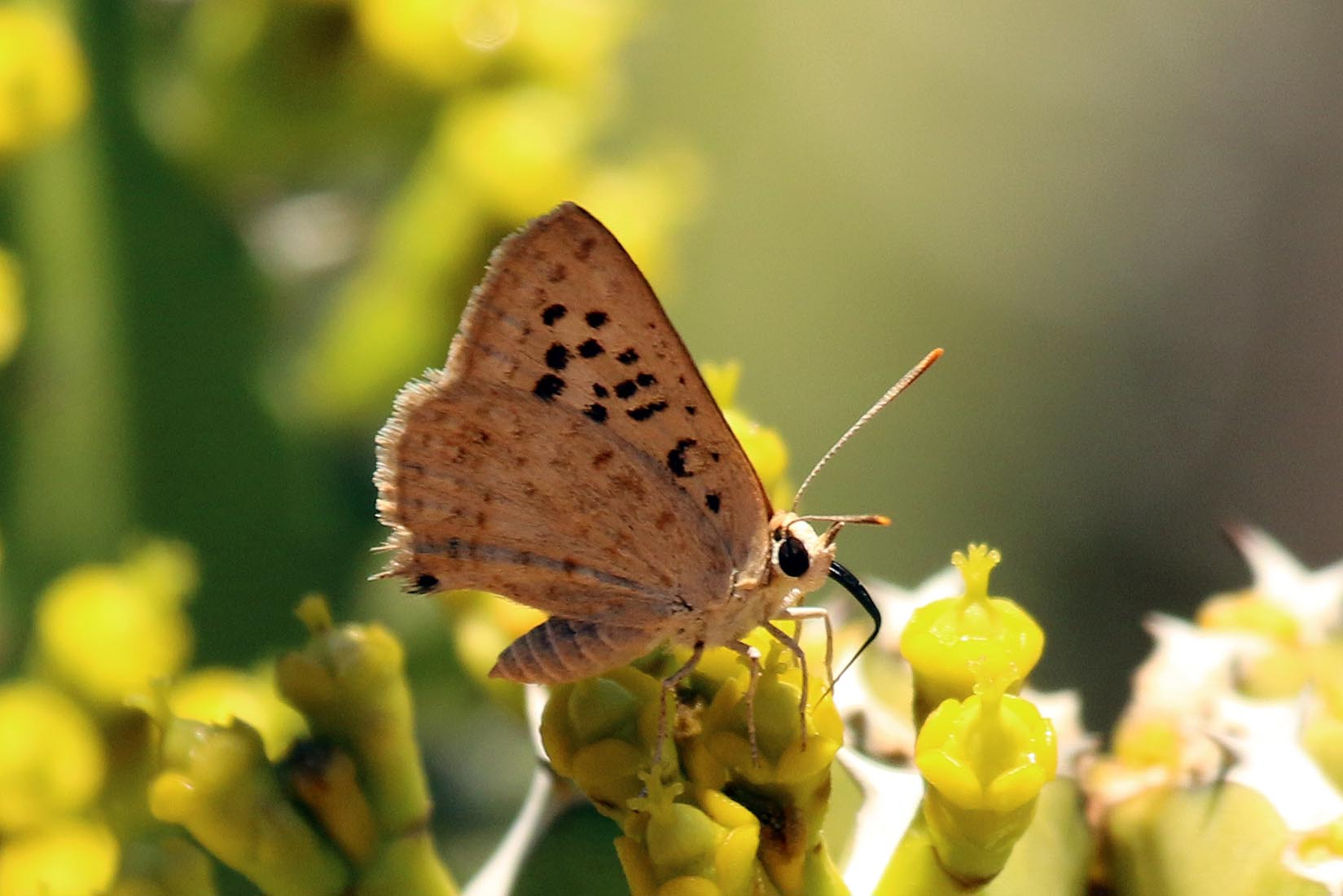
- C. leroma

Scientific classification
- Domain: Eukaryota
- Kingdom: Animalia
- Phylum: Arthropoda
- Class: Insecta
- Order: Lepidoptera
- Family: Lycaenidae
- Subfamily: Aphnaeinae
- Genus: Crudaria; Wallengren, 1875

= Crudaria =

Butterfly genus in family Lycaenidae

Crudaria is an Afrotropical genus of butterflies in the family Lycaenidae.

== Species ==
- Crudaria capensis van Son, 1956
- Crudaria leroma (Wallengren, 1857)
- Crudaria wykehami Dickson, 1983
