= Aphnaeus jacksoni =

Scientific classification
- Kingdom: Animalia
- Phylum: Arthropoda
- Clade: Pancrustacea
- Class: Insecta
- Order: Lepidoptera
- Family: Lycaenidae
- Genus: Aphnaeus
- Species: A. jacksoni

Binomial name
- Aphnaeus jacksoni Stempffer, 1954

Species of butterfly

Aphnaeus jacksoni, the Jackson's highflier, is a butterfly in the family Lycaenidae. It is found in northern Uganda and Kenya (from the north-western part of the country to the area north of Mount Elgon).
