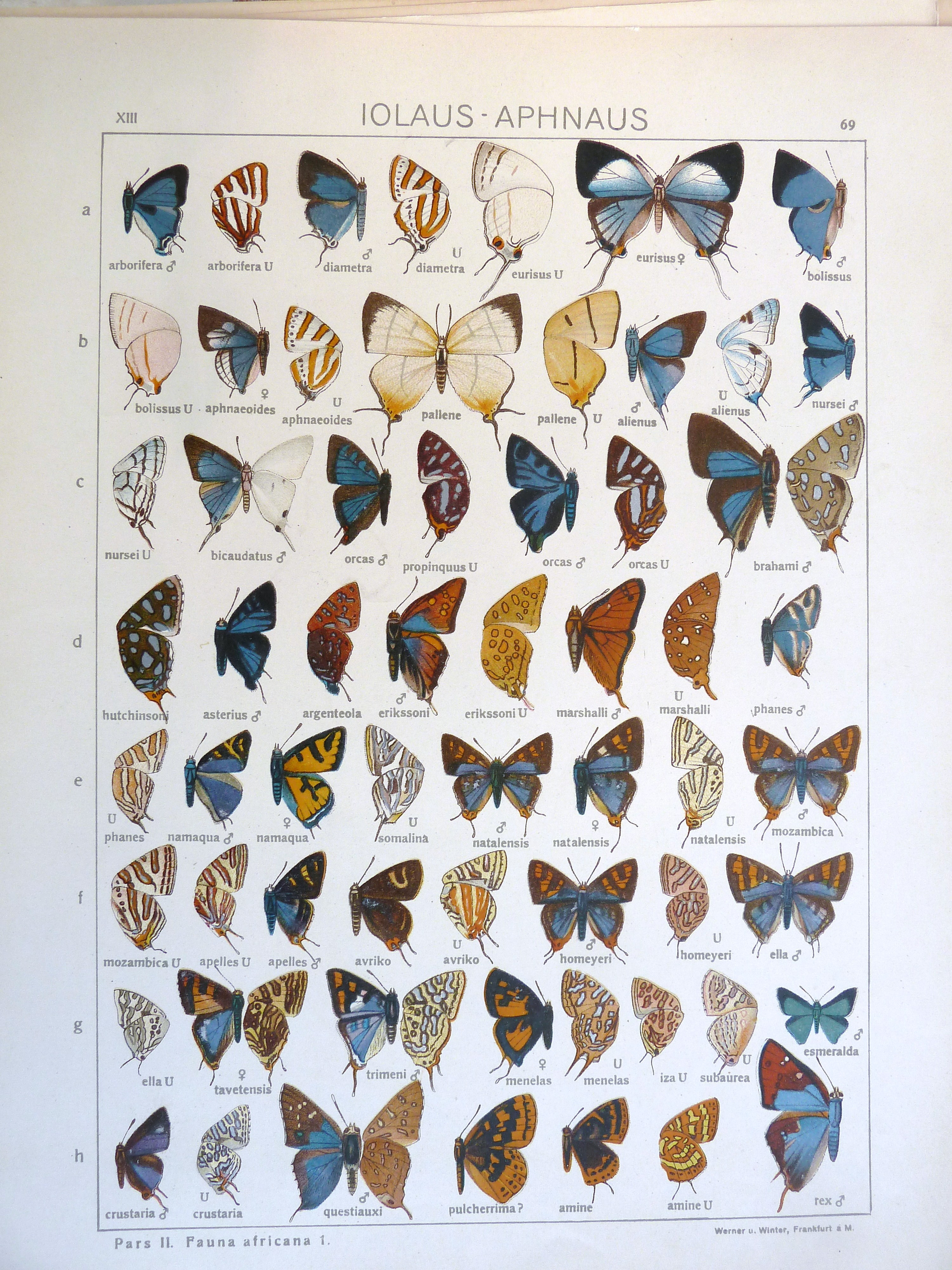
- Seitz Fauna Africana Taf 69 (line c)

Scientific classification
- Domain: Eukaryota
- Kingdom: Animalia
- Phylum: Arthropoda
- Class: Insecta
- Order: Lepidoptera
- Family: Lycaenidae
- Genus: Aphnaeus
- Species: A. argyrocyclus

Binomial name
- Aphnaeus argyrocyclus Holland, 1890

Synonyms
- Aphnaeus propinquus Holland, 1893

= Aphnaeus argyrocyclus =

Rare silver spot

Species of butterfly

Aphnaeus argyrocyclus, the rare silver spot, is a butterfly in the family Lycaenidae. It is found in Ivory Coast, Ghana, Nigeria (the eastern part of the country and the Cross River loop), Cameroon, Gabon, the Republic of the Congo, the Central African Republic, the Democratic Republic of the Congo (Équateur, Tshopo, and Maniema), Uganda, and north-western Tanzania. The habitat consists of forests.

The larvae feed on Alchornea cordifolia.
