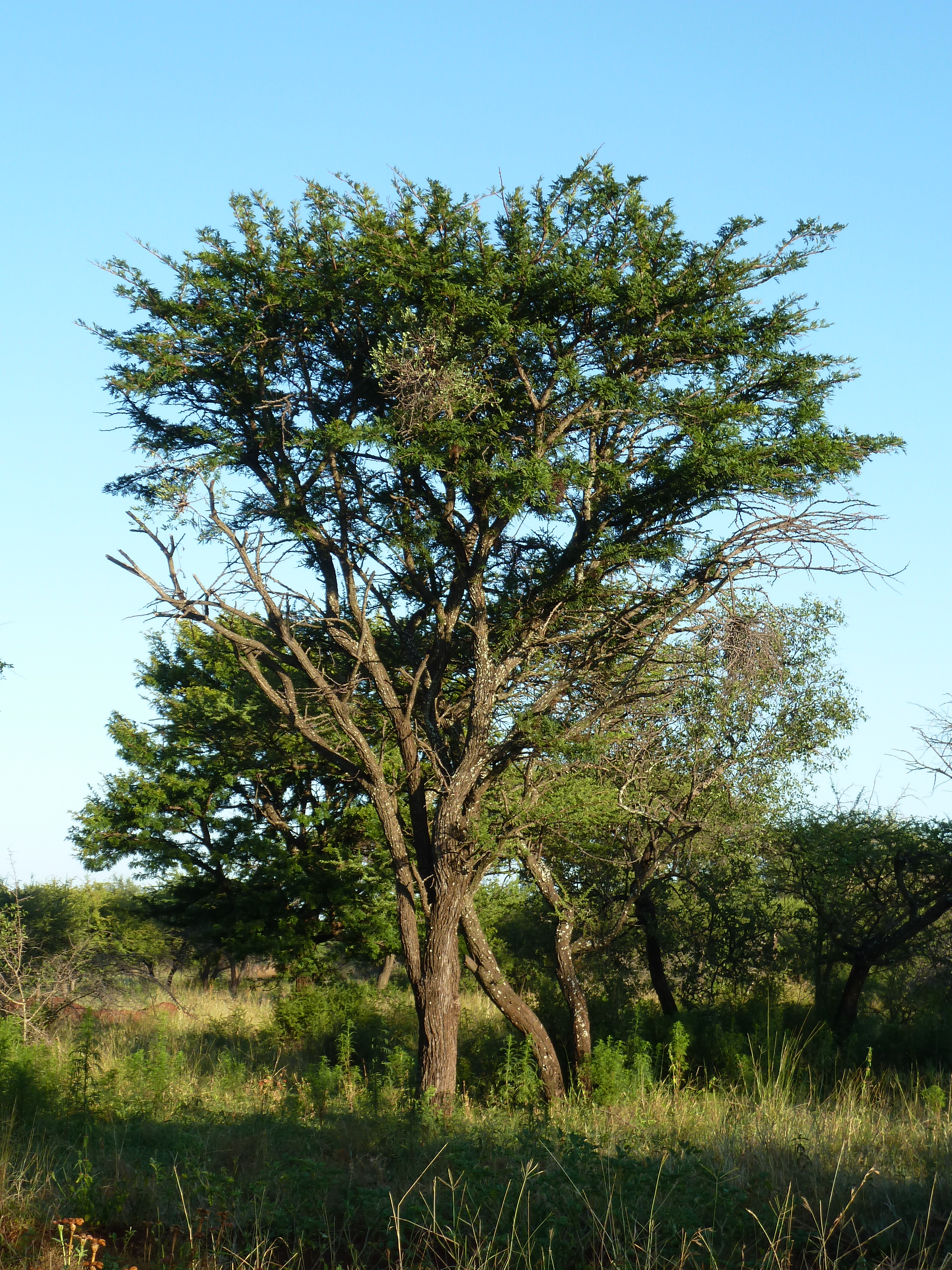
- On the Springbok Flats

Conservation status
- Least Concern (IUCN 3.1)

Scientific classification
- Kingdom: Plantae
- Clade: Tracheophytes
- Clade: Angiosperms
- Clade: Eudicots
- Clade: Rosids
- Order: Fabales
- Family: Fabaceae
- Subfamily: Caesalpinioideae
- Clade: Mimosoid clade
- Genus: Vachellia
- Species: V. robusta

Binomial name
- Vachellia robusta (Burch.) Kyal. & Boatwr.

Subspecies
- Vachellia robusta subsp. clavigera (E.Mey.) Kyal. & Boatwr.; Vachellia robusta subsp. robusta (Burch.) Kyal. & Boatwr.; Vachellia robusta subsp. usambarensis (Taub.) Kyal. & Boatwr.

Synonyms
- Acacia robusta Burch.

= Vachellia robusta =

Species of legume

Vachellia robusta, the splendid thorn, is an Afrotropical tree species.

It is native to eastern and southern Africa, ranging from Ethiopia and Somalia in the north to South Africa and Namibia in southern Africa.

== Subspecies ==
Three subspecies are accepted:

- Vachellia robusta subsp. clavigera (E.Mey.) Kyal. & Boatwr. – native to Malawi, Mozambique, Zambia, Zimbabwe, Botswana, Namibia, Eswatini, and South Africa.
- Vachellia robusta subsp. robusta – native to South Africa, Botswana, and western Zimbabwe.
- Vachellia robusta subsp. usambarensis (Taub.) Kyal. & Boatwr. – native to Ethiopia, Somalia, Kenya, Tanzania, and Mozambique. It is a common canopy tree in drier undifferentiated forest communities in the Northern and Southern Zanzibar-Inhambane coastal forest mosaic of coastal Somalia, Kenya, Tanzania, and Mozambique, where it grows up to 20 meters high.

== Gallery ==
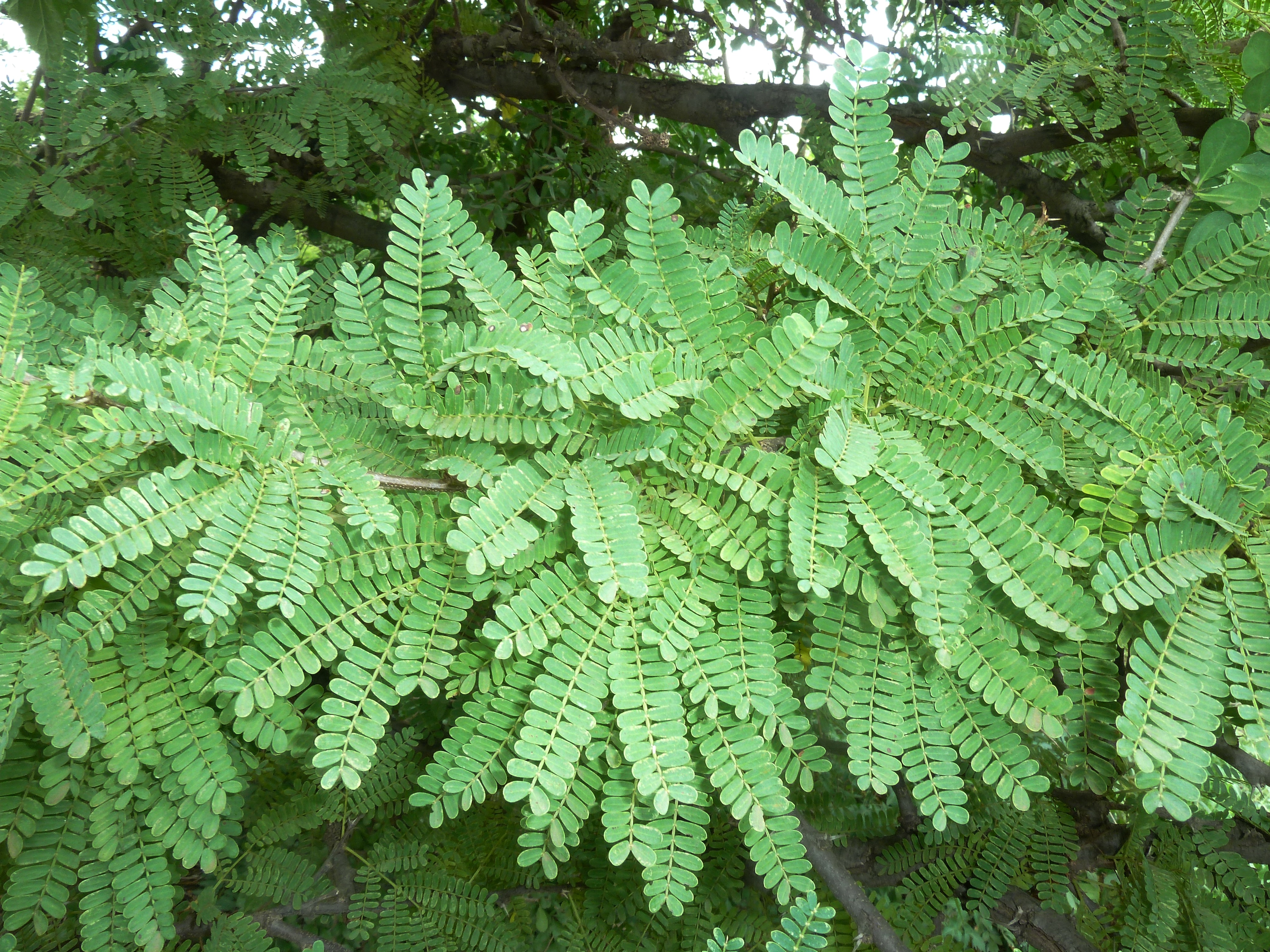
Foliage

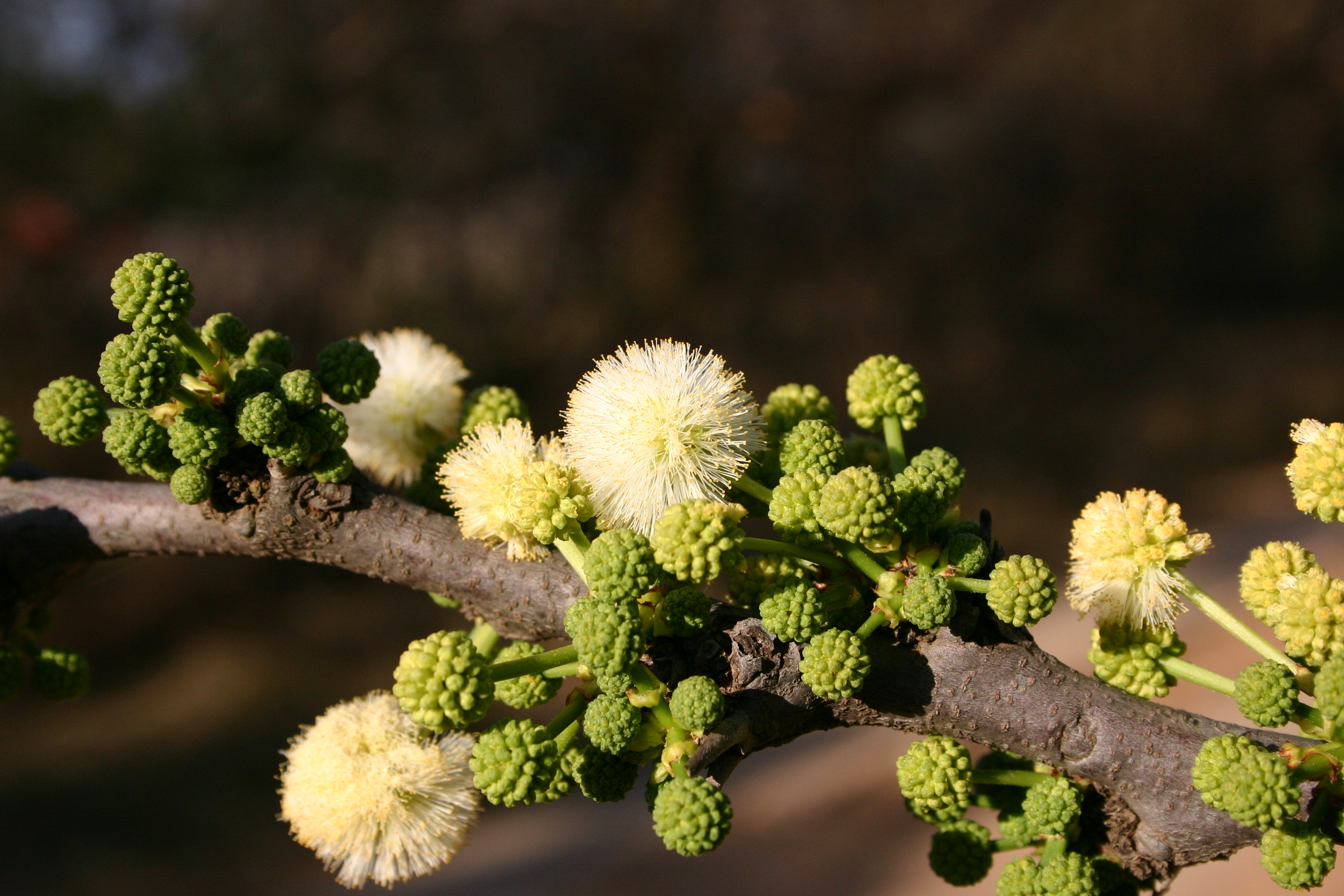
Flowers and flower buds

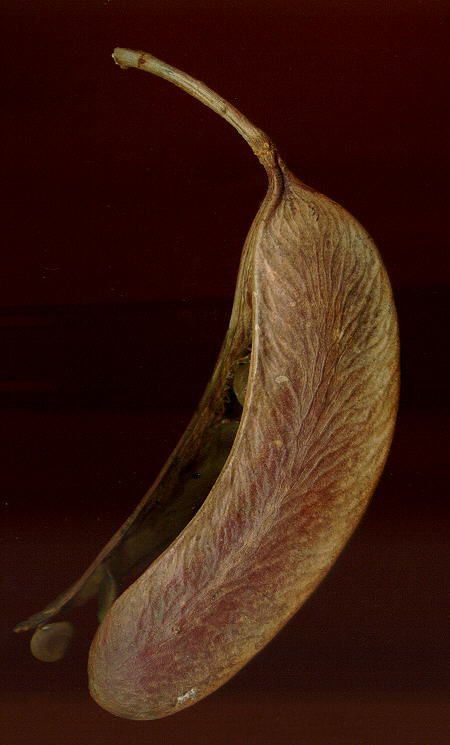
Seed pod
