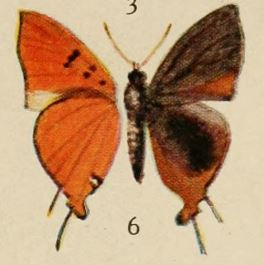
- Aphnaeus chapini

Scientific classification
- Domain: Eukaryota
- Kingdom: Animalia
- Phylum: Arthropoda
- Class: Insecta
- Order: Lepidoptera
- Family: Lycaenidae
- Subfamily: Aphnaeinae
- Genus: Aphnaeus; Hübner, [1819]

Synonyms
- Aphnaemorpha de Nicéville, 1890; Paraphnaeus Thierry-Mieg, 1904

= Aphnaeus =

Butterfly genus in family Lycaenidae

Aphnaeus is a genus of butterflies in the family Lycaenidae. The species of this genus are found in the Afrotropical realm.

== Species ==
- Aphnaeus abriana Collins & Libert, 2013
- Aphnaeus adamsi Stempffer, 1954
- Aphnaeus affinis Riley, 1921
- Aphnaeus argyrocyclus Holland, 1890
- Aphnaeus asterius Plötz, 1880
- Aphnaeus boormani Libert, 2013
- Aphnaeus brahami Lathy, 1903
- Aphnaeus cameruna Libert, 2013
- Aphnaeus chapini (Holland, 1920)
- Aphnaeus charboneli Bouyer & Libert, 1996
- Aphnaeus curlei Libert & Collins, 2013
- Aphnaeus ebogo Libert, 2013
- Aphnaeus erikssoni Trimen, 1891
- Aphnaeus flavescens Stempffer, 1954
- Aphnaeus gilloni Stempffer, 1966
- Aphnaeus herbuloti Stempffer, 1971
- Aphnaeus hutchinsonii Trimen, 1887
- Aphnaeus jacksoni Stempffer, 1954
- Aphnaeus jefferyi Hawker-Smith, 1928
- Aphnaeus kiellandi Stempffer, 1972
- Aphnaeus liberti Bouyer, 1996
- Aphnaeus marci Collins & Larsen, 2008
- Aphnaeus marshalli Neave, 1910
- Aphnaeus mashunae Stempffer, 1954
- Aphnaeus mirabilis Sáfián, Libert & Collins, 2013
- Aphnaeus neavei Bethune-Baker, 1926
- Aphnaeus nimbaensis Sáfián, Libert & Collins, 2013
- Aphnaeus nyanzae Stempffer, 1954
- Aphnaeus orcas (Drury, 1782)
- Aphnaeus questiauxi Aurivillius, 1903
- Aphnaeus rex Aurivillius, 1909
- Aphnaeus safiani Libert, 2013
- Aphnaeus suk Libert, 2013
- Aphnaeus williamsi Carcasson, 1964
- Aphnaeus zanzibarensis Grose-Smith, 1889
