= Labuschagne =

Labuschagne or Labuschagné (usually la-bus-kagh-nee in South Africa; also Lab-u-shane) is a surname often used by Afrikaners or people of Afrikaner descent from South Africa.

== History ==
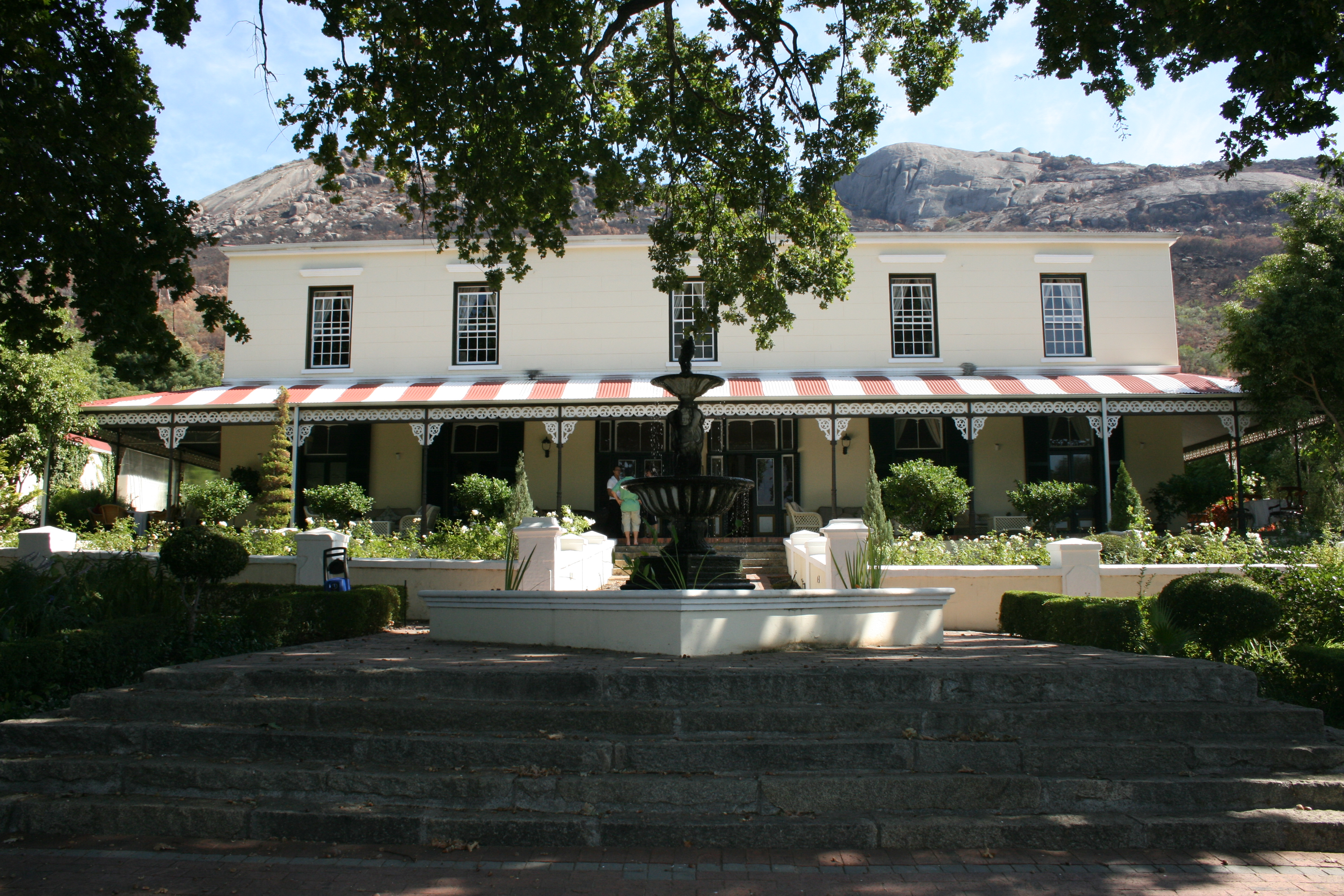
Pontac manor, original property of Pierre Labuscaigne

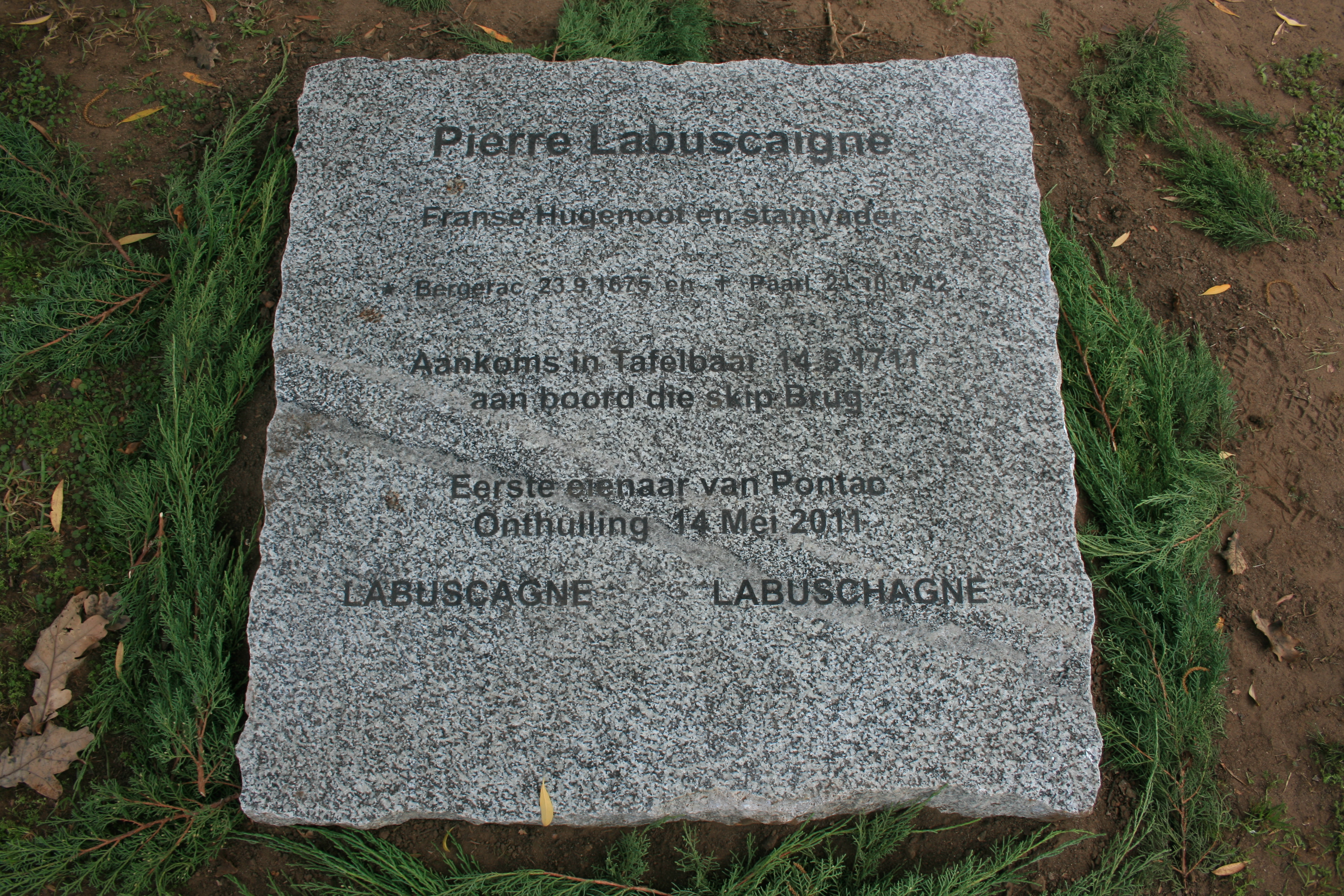
Labuschagne memorial stone

The Labuscaigne family in France were French Huguenots, who suffered persecution in the 18th century. In 1710 Pierre Labuscaigne entered into the service of the Dutch East India Company (VOC) as "Tamboerine" aboard the ship Verbergh, and embarked from Holland for the east. Labuscaigne was left behind when Verbergh reached the Cape of Good Hope, as he was too sick to continue the voyage. He was indentured to a succession of local families as a tutor, and later became sexton of the Drakenstein congregation. Upon his release from his VOC contract, he sent for his wife and children, who joined him ten years after his departure from Holland. He purchased a portion of land and named it Pontac, after the feudal lord of the region of his origin in France, the Duke of Pontacq.

The family eventually migrated to the Eastern Cape border region in the present-day region of Cradock, where the family featured in the Slagtersnek rebellion. The majority of the family left the Eastern Cape during the Great Trek, starting in 1836, and migrated to places in the Transvaal and Free State, as well as Natal.

The family name has experienced minor variation in spelling over the years. In modern times, the variations that dominate are Labuschagne and Labuscagne. Of the Labuscaigne family members in France, no other name-bearing descendants appear to have survived to the present age.

The Labuschagne Family Union unveiled a memorial to commemorate the founding of the Labuschagne family at the Cape in 2011. The stone was laid at the Pontac Manor Hotel in Paarl. Upon change of ownership, the stone had to be moved in 2015 to its present location at the Huguenot Memorial Museum in Franschhoek.

== People with the surname ==
Notable people with the surname include:

- Barend Labuschagne (born 1968), South African former wrestler
- Cathlene Labuschagne, South African politician
- Gérard Labuschagne, South African forensic investigator, head of the police Investigative Psychology Unit from 2000, after Micki Pistorius
- Gerrie Labuschagné (born 1995), South African rugby union player
- Jaco Labuschagne (born 1999), South African rugby union player
- Jannes Labuschagne (born 1976), South African rugby union player
- Jeandre Labuschagne (born 1999), South African rugby union player
- Kim Labuschagne (born 1967; later Benson), South African-American former tennis player
- Nicola Labuschagne (born 1967), South African Mental health expert and therapist
- Lappies Labuschagné, known as Pieter Labuschagné (born 1989), South African-born Japanese international rugby union footballer
- Leon Labuschagne, South African paralympic athlete
- Les Labuschagne (born 1941), retired South African politician and diplomat
- Marco Labuschagné (born 1998), South African rugby sevens player for the national team
- Marnus Labuschagne (born 1994), South African-Australian cricketer
- Zandre Labuschagne (born 1986), South African former female artistic gymnast
