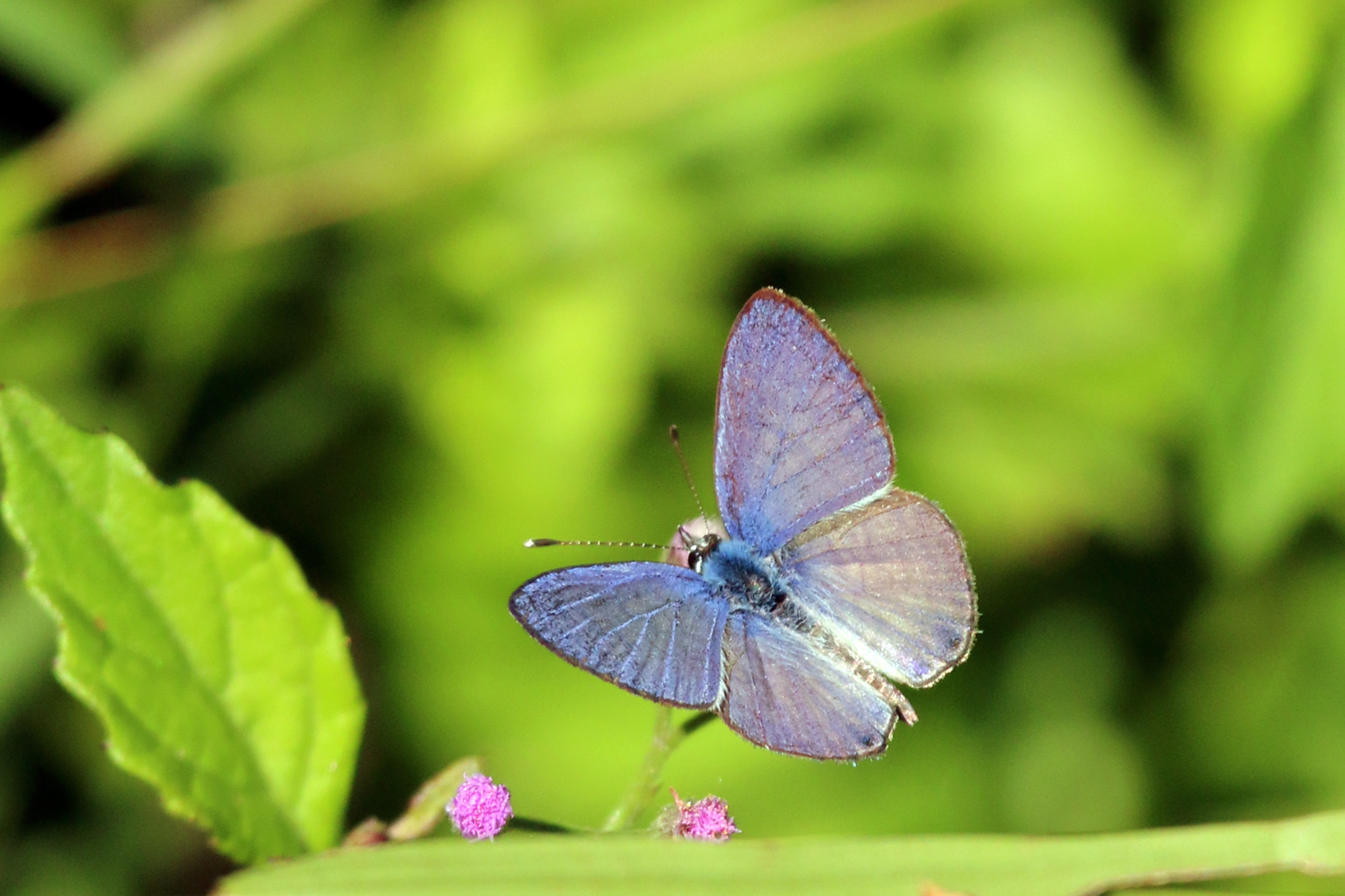
- Male L. c. theonus, Jamaica
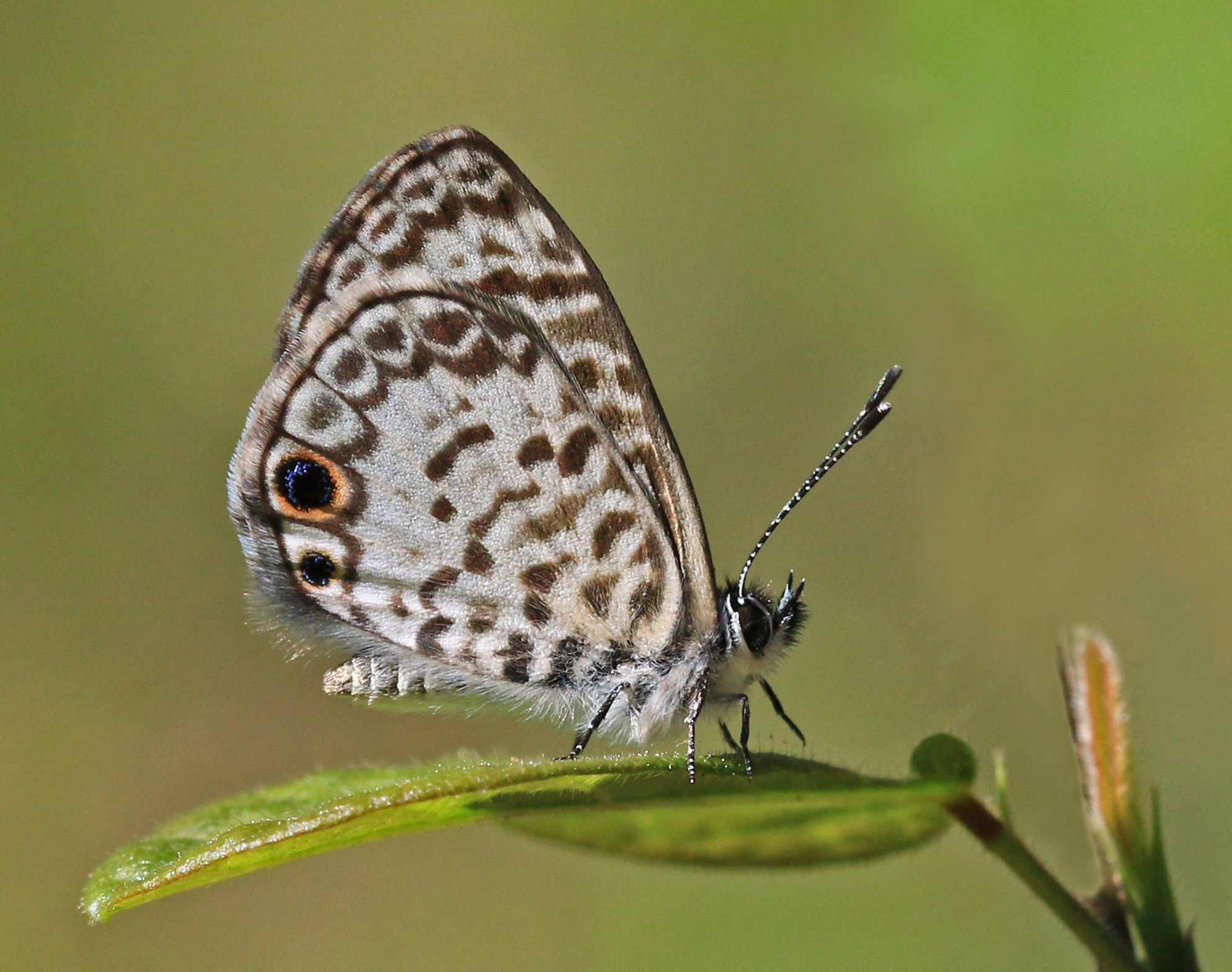
- L. c. theonus, Cuba

Conservation status
- Secure (NatureServe)

Scientific classification
- Kingdom: Animalia
- Phylum: Arthropoda
- Class: Insecta
- Order: Lepidoptera
- Family: Lycaenidae
- Genus: Leptotes
- Species: L. cassius

Binomial name
- Leptotes cassius (Cramer, 1775)

Synonyms
- Lycaena cassius; Papilio cassius

= Leptotes cassius =

Species of butterfly

Leptotes cassius, the Cassius blue or tropical striped blue, is a butterfly of the family Lycaenidae. It is found in North America in Florida including the Keys, Texas south through the Caribbean, Mexico, and Central America to South America. Strays have been found in New Mexico, Kansas, Missouri, South Carolina, North Carolina and Virginia.

The wingspan is 20–35 mm.

The butterfly species has an important role in Marisha Pessl's 2006 novel Special Topics in Calamity Physics. The protagonist, Blue van Meer, is named in honor of the Cassius blue.

The caterpillars feed natively on Fabaceae. Food plants on record are Amorpha crenulata, woolly rattlepod (Crotalaria incana), Galactia regularis and lima bean (Phaseolus lunatus). It can also successfully develop feeding on Cape leadwort (Plumbago auriculata) or doctorbush (P. scandens), which (among the eudicots) are not closely related to its usual food plants.

== Subspecies ==
- L. c. cassius – Suriname, Trinidad & Tobago
- L. c. catilina
- L. c. theonus (Lucas, 1857) – Florida, Cuba, Bahamas, Greater Antilles
- L. c. cassidula (Boisduval, 1870) – Texas, Mexico, Honduras to Panama
- L. c. cassioides – Windward Islands, including Dominica
- L. c. striata

L. c. theonus (and consequently L. cassius itself) is the type species of the genus Leptotes.
