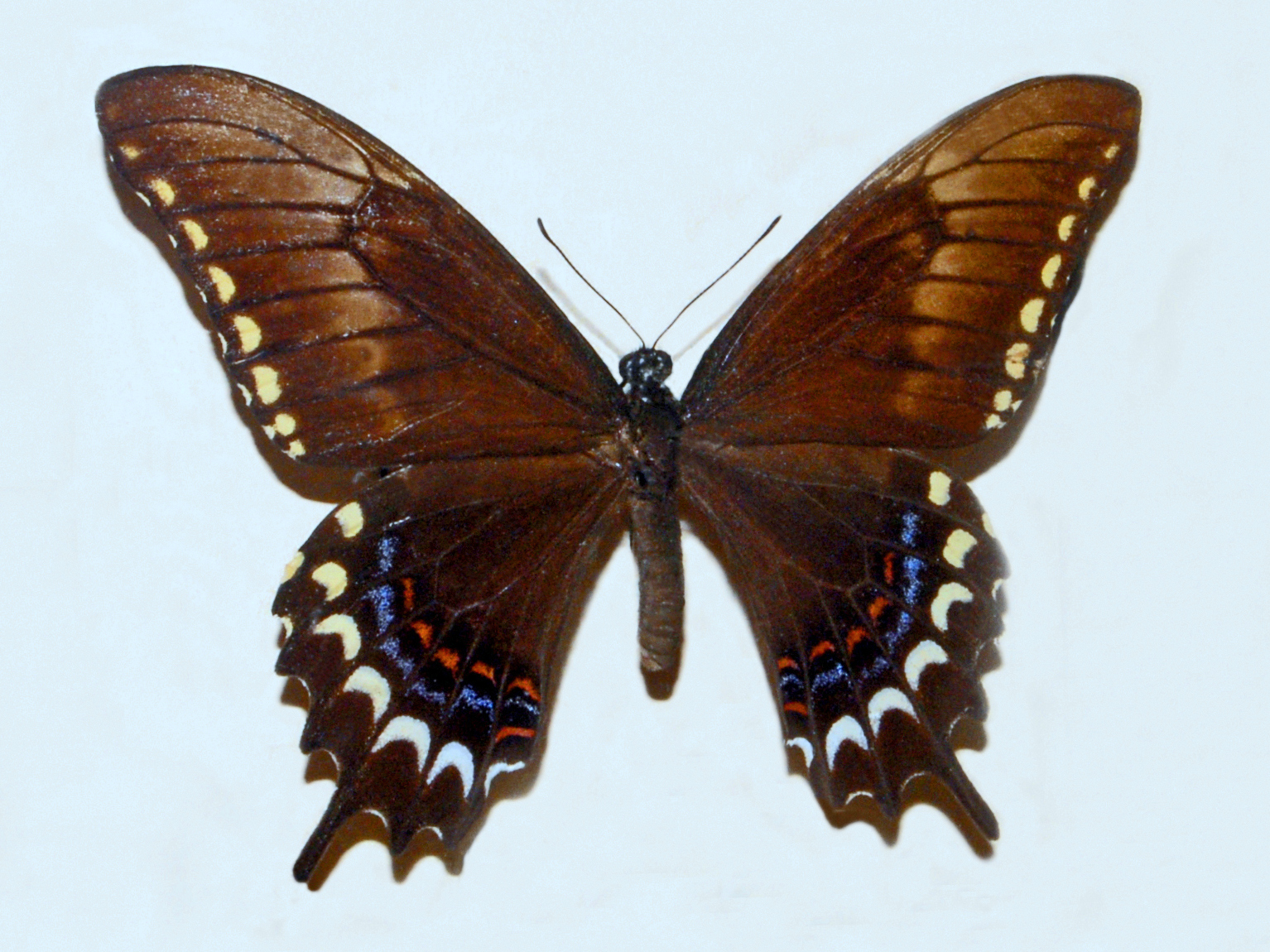
- Mounted specimen on display at Museo di Scienze Naturali Enrico Caffi, Bergamo Female
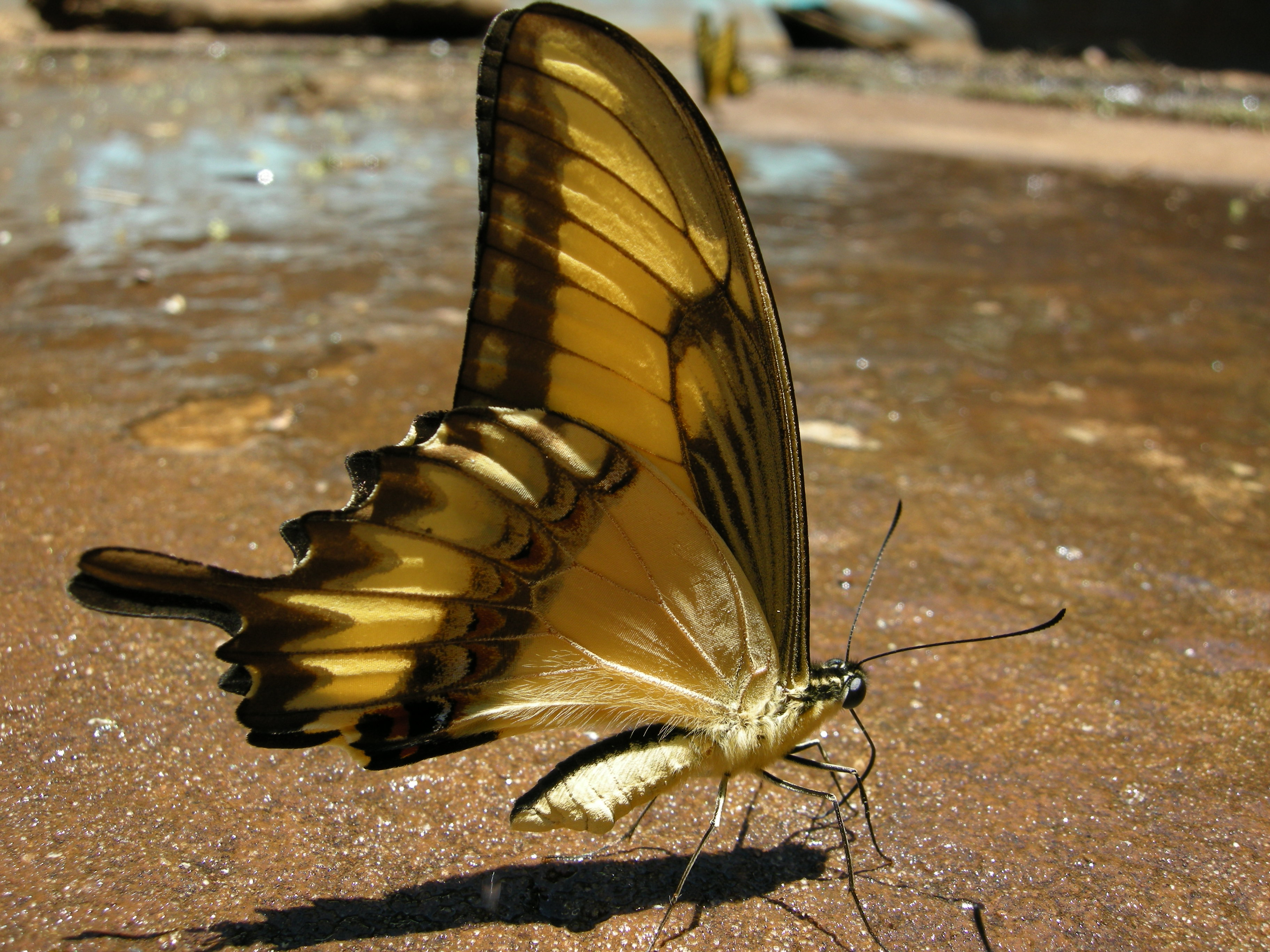

Conservation status
- Least Concern (IUCN 3.1)

Scientific classification
- Kingdom: Animalia
- Phylum: Arthropoda
- Clade: Pancrustacea
- Class: Insecta
- Order: Lepidoptera
- Family: Papilionidae
- Genus: Papilio
- Species: P. astyalus

Binomial name
- Papilio astyalus Godart, 1819

Synonyms
- Calaides astyalus; Heraclides astyalus; Heraclides lycophron Hübner, [1823]; Papilio mentor Dalman, 1823; Papilio pirithous Boisduval, 1836 (preocc. Linnaeus, 1767); Papilio oebalus Boisduval, 1836; Papilio drepanon Gray, 1856; Papilio lycophron; Papilio pallas Gray, [1853]; Papilio hozaus Ehrmann, 1921; Papilio hippomedon C. & R. Felder, 1859; Papilio theophron C. & R. Felder, 1865

= Papilio astyalus =

Species of butterfly

Papilio astyalus, the broad-banded swallowtail or Astyalus swallowtail, is a butterfly of the family Papilionidae. It is found from Mexico south to Argentina. It is occasionally reported from southern Texas and rare strays can be found up to southern Arizona and northern Texas.

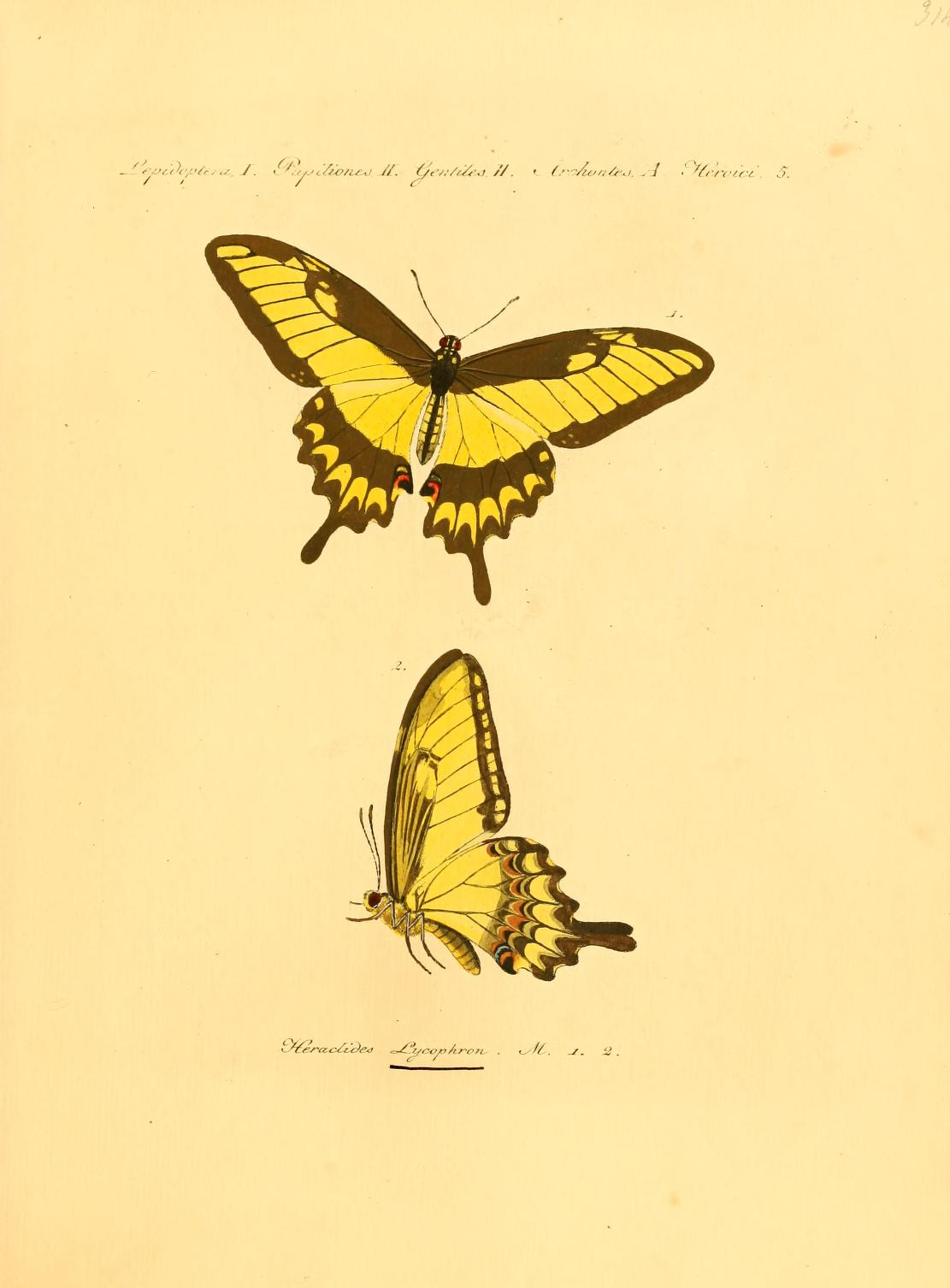
Male.Illustration in Jacob Hübner, [1821] Sammlung exotischer Schmetterlinge(plate 100)

The wingspan is 117–120 mm. In the male the wings are black, on the obverse the forewings are crossed by a wide yellow band crossed by black veins. There is a small yellow macula in the cell and a series of yellow macules in the submarginal part. The hindwings bear tails, a yellow band in the extension of that of the forewings, submarginal yellow macules, and an orange-red ocellus surmounted by an iridescent blue lunule in the anal angle. On the reverse the wings have similar patterns but the cell of the fore wings is striped with yellow and the black part of the hind wings is smaller. The hindwings also bear a series of iridescent blue lunules surmounted by orange-red lunules.

The female is darker, and lacks the broad yellow band present in the male. On the obverse the forewings are dark brown, paler in the submarginal part and bear a series of submarginal yellow macules. The hindwings are dark brown with a series of submarginal red, iridescent blue and yellow macules, an orange ocellus in the anal angle and more reduced tails. The reverse is similar, but the blue spots are more reduced and are surmounted by orange-red lunules.

Male has yellow body below and flanks but black above, female has black body.Very similar to Papilio thersites.

Adults are on wing from April to October. There are probably two generations per year.

The larvae feed on the leaves of Citrus trees. Adults feed on the nectar of various flowers, including Lantana species.

== Subspecies ==
- P. a. astyalus (Brazil (Rio Grande do Sul, São Paulo, Minas Gerais, Parana), Argentina, Paraguay)
- P. a. pallas Gray, [1853] (Texas, Mexico, Costa Rica)
- P. a. bajaensis Brown & Faulkner, 1992 (Mexico (Baja California Sur))
- P. a. hippomedon (C. & R. Felder, 1859) (Colombia, Venezuela)
- P. a. phanias Rothschild & Jordan, 1906 (Ecuador, Peru, Bolivia, Goias)
- P. a. anchicayaensis Constantino, Le Crom & Salazar, 2002 (Colombia

== Taxonomy ==
Papilio astyalus is a member of the Papilio thoas species group.

== Biogeographic realm ==
Neotropical realm.
