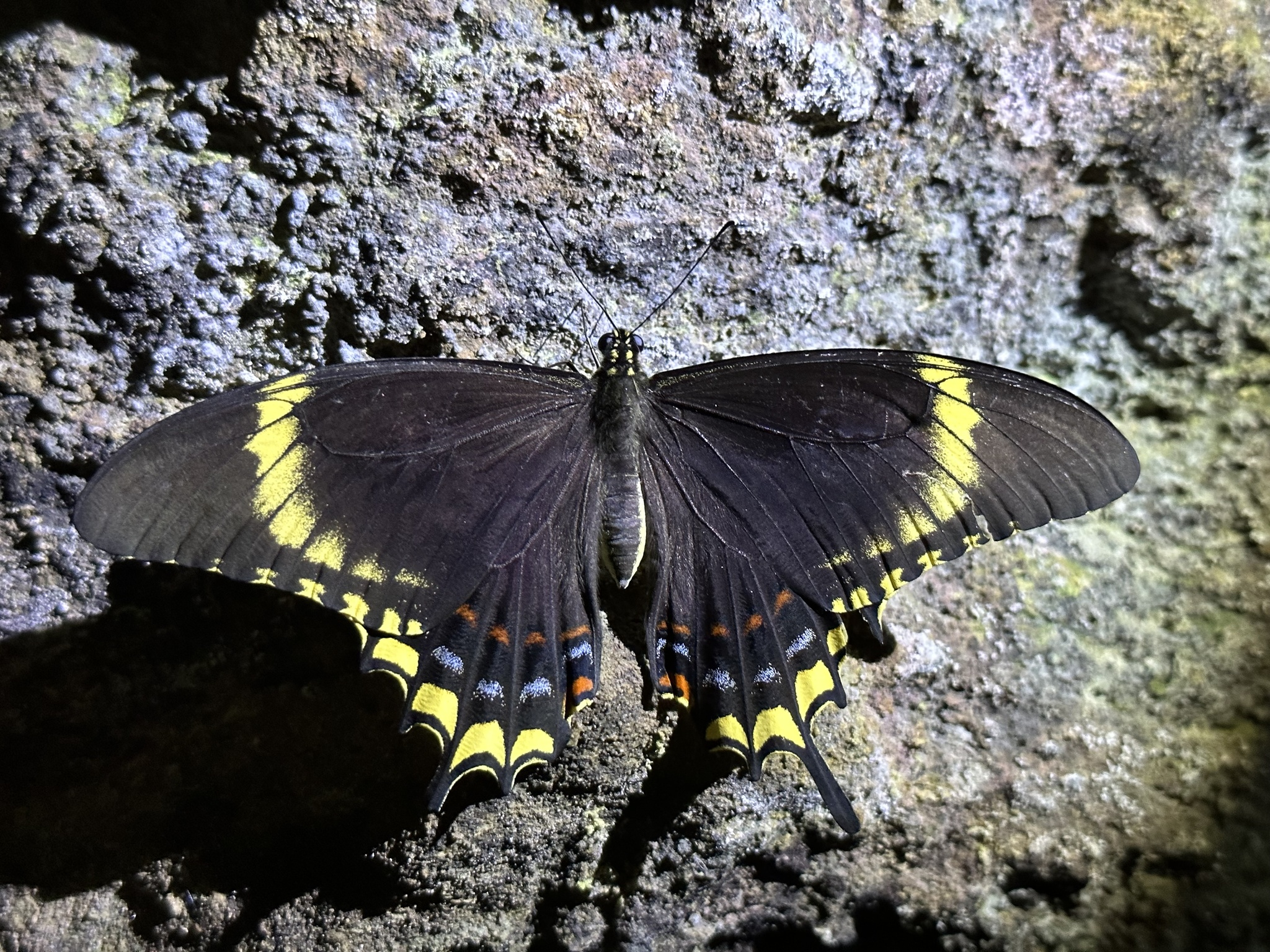

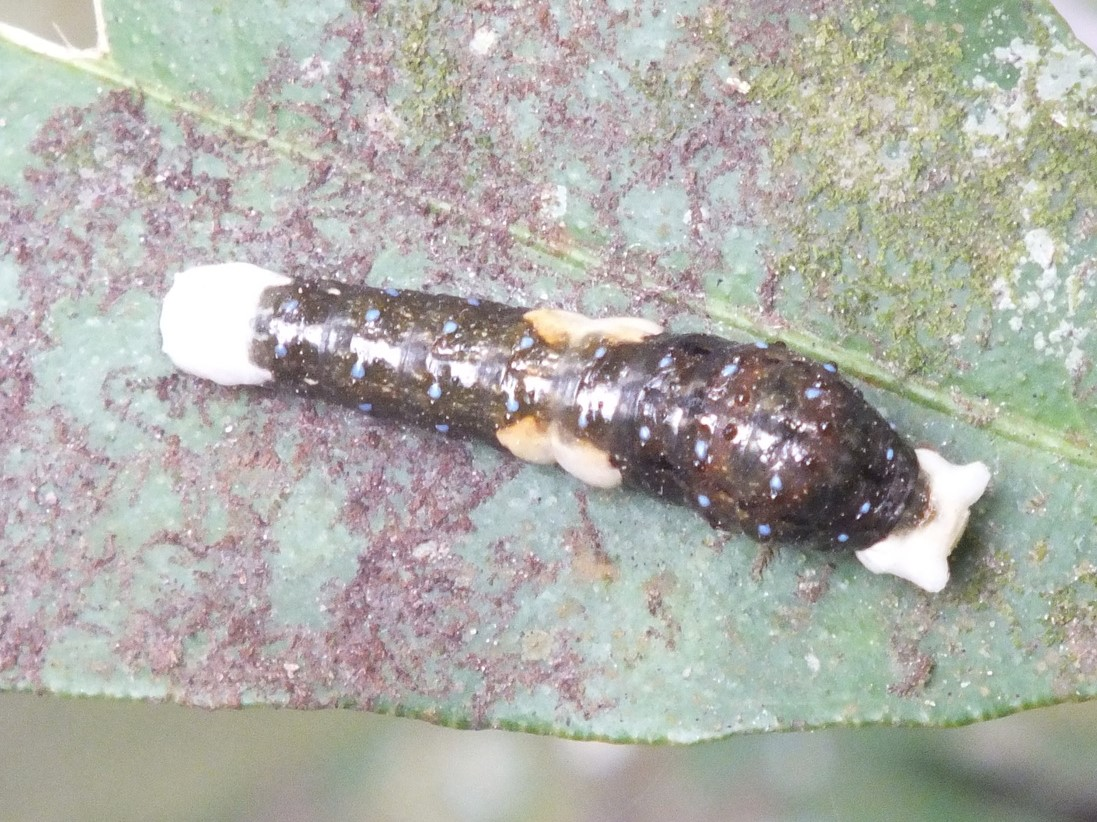
- Adult (top) and larva (bottom)

Scientific classification
- Kingdom: Animalia
- Phylum: Arthropoda
- Clade: Pancrustacea
- Class: Insecta
- Order: Lepidoptera
- Family: Papilionidae
- Genus: Papilio
- Species: P. thersites

Binomial name
- Papilio thersites Fabricius, 1775

Synonyms
- Papilio palamedes Fabricius, 1775 (preocc. Drury, 1773); Papilio acamas Fabricius, 1793; Heraclides thersites

= Papilio thersites =

Species of butterfly

Papilio thersites, the Thersites swallowtail or false Androgeus swallowtail, is a Neotropical butterfly of the family Papilionidae. It is endemic to Jamaica.

Papilio thersites is similar in appearance to Papilio astyalus. In the male the yellow band on the forewing is very broad and the cell-spot very large. In the female the forewing has a curved yellow band. The larvae are also similar to those of Papilio astyalus.

== Taxonomy ==
Papilio thersites is a member of the Papilio thoas species group.
