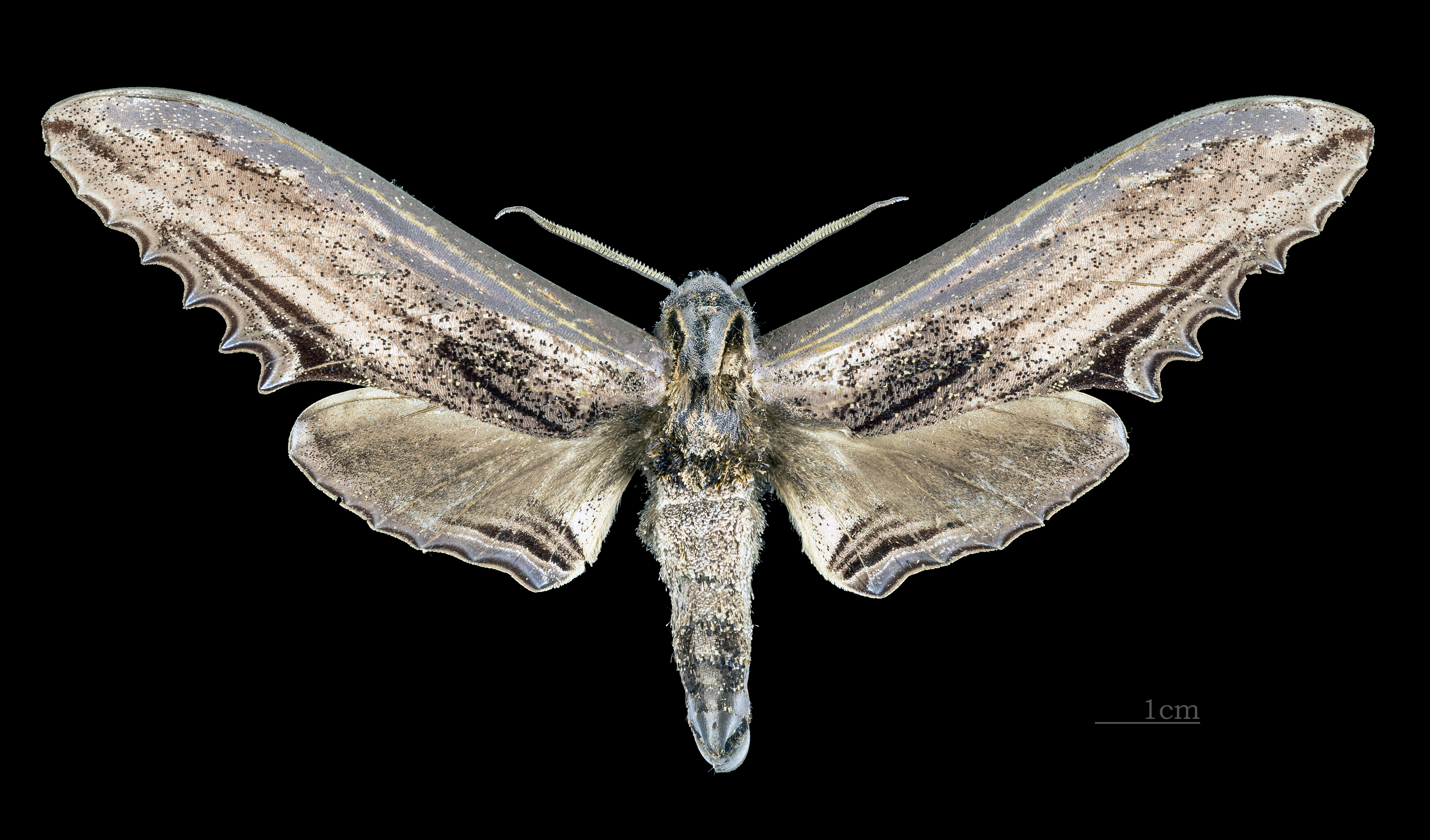
- Langia zenzeroides

Scientific classification
- Kingdom: Animalia
- Phylum: Arthropoda
- Class: Insecta
- Order: Lepidoptera
- Family: Sphingidae
- Tribe: Smerinthini
- Genus: Langia; Moore, 1872

Species
- See text

= Langia =

Genus of moths

As (invalidly) established by Tutt in 1906, Langia refers to the butterfly genus Leptotes.

Langia is a genus of moths in the family Sphingidae.

== Species ==
- Langia zenzeroides Moore, 1872
  - Langia zenzeroides formosana
