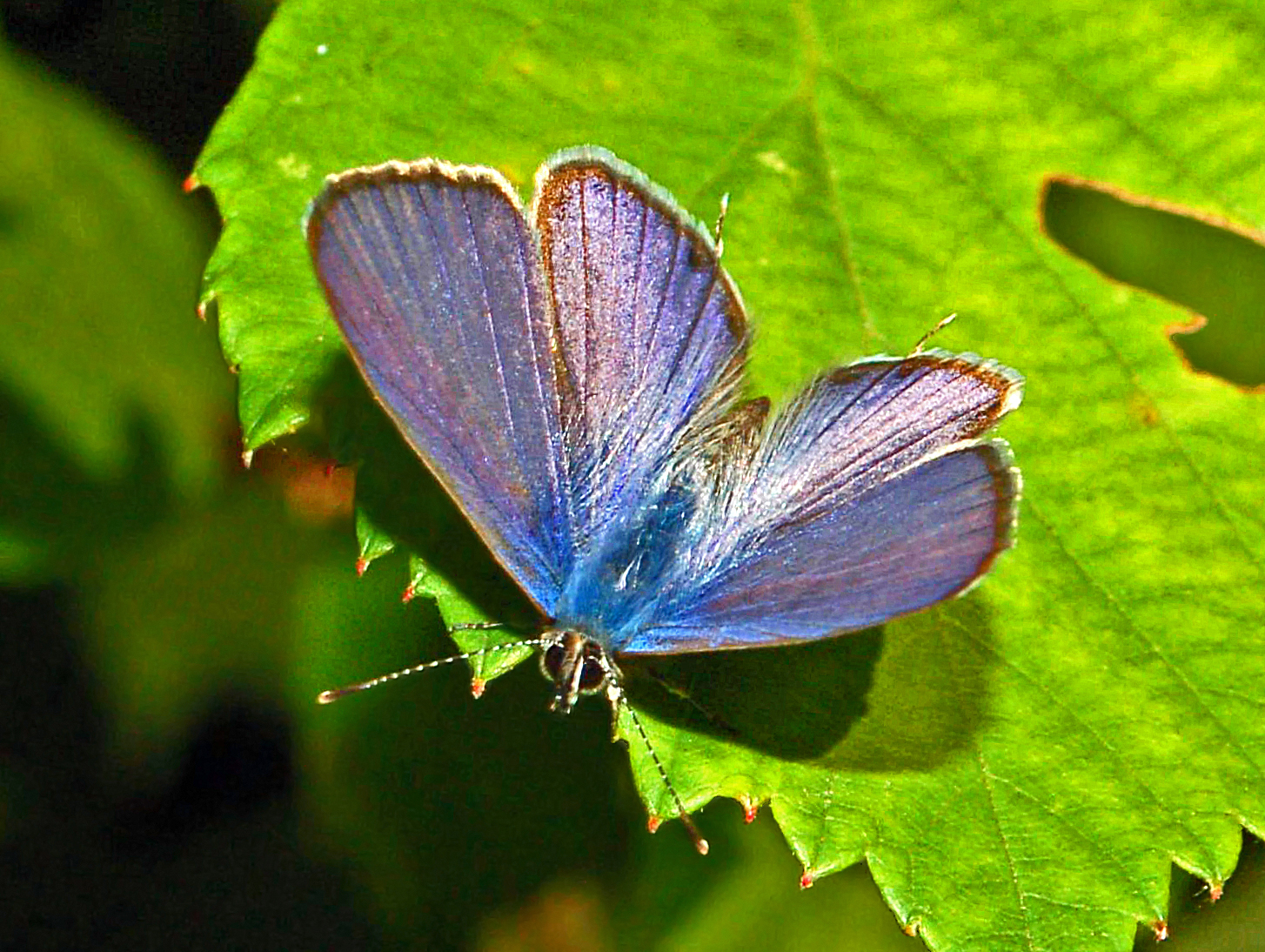
- Lang's short-tailed blue (Leptotes pirithous)

Scientific classification
- Kingdom: Animalia
- Phylum: Arthropoda
- Clade: Pancrustacea
- Class: Insecta
- Order: Lepidoptera
- Family: Lycaenidae
- Subfamily: Polyommatinae
- Tribe: Polyommatini
- Genus: Leptotes; Scudder, 1876

Type species
- Lycaena theonus Lucas, 1857

Diversity
- 29 species

Synonyms
- Cyclyrius Butler, [1897]; Langia Tutt, 1906 (non Moore, 1872: preoccupied); Raywardia Tutt, 1908; Syntarucoides Kaye, 1904; Syntarucus Butler, 1901

= Leptotes (butterfly) =

Butterfly genus in family Lycaenidae

Leptotes is a butterfly genus in the family Lycaenidae. They are commonly known as zebra blues in reference to their zebra-striped undersides.

The genus Cyclyrius was recently synonymized with Leptotes and its two species were thus moved to this genus.

== Species ==
The genus can be divided into several distinct geographic groups which often correspond to clades:

Afrotropical and Palaearctic species:

- Leptotes adamsoni Collins & Larsen, 1991 – Adamson's zebra blue
- Leptotes babaulti (Stempffer, 1935) – Babault's zebra blue
- Leptotes brevidentatus (Tite, 1958) – Tite's zebra blue
- Leptotes casca (Tite, 1958)
- Leptotes cassioides (Capronnier, 1889)
- Leptotes durrelli Fric, Pyrcz & Wiemers, 2019
- Leptotes jeanneli (Stempffer, 1935)
- Leptotes mandersi (Druce, 1907)
- Leptotes marginalis (Stempffer, 1944) – black-bordered zebra blue
- Leptotes mayottensis (Tite, 1958)
- Leptotes pirithous (Linnaeus, 1767) – Lang's short-tailed blue, common zebra blue
- Leptotes pulcher (Murray, 1874) – beautiful zebra blue
- Leptotes pyrczi Libert, 2011
- Leptotes rabefaner (Mabille, 1877)
- Leptotes sanctithomae (Sharpe, 1893)
- Leptotes socotranus (Ogilvie-Grant, 1899)
- Leptotes webbianus (Brullé, 1839) – Canary blue

Indomalayan species:

- Leptotes plinius (Fabricius, 1793) – zebra blue, plumbago blue

Australasian species:

- Leptotes lybas (Godart, [1824])

Neotropical species:

- Leptotes andicola (Godman & Salvin, 1891)
- Leptotes bathyllos Tessmann, 1928
- Leptotes callanga (Dyar, 1913)
- Leptotes cassius (Cramer, [1775]) – Cassius blue, tropical striped blue
- Leptotes delalande Bálint & Johnson, 1995
- Leptotes lamasi Bálint & Johnson, 1995
- Leptotes marina (Reakirt, 1868) – marine blue, striped blue
- Leptotes parrhasioides (Wallengren, 1860) – Galapagos blue
- Leptotes perkinsae Kaye, 1931
- Leptotes trigemmatus (Butler, 1881)

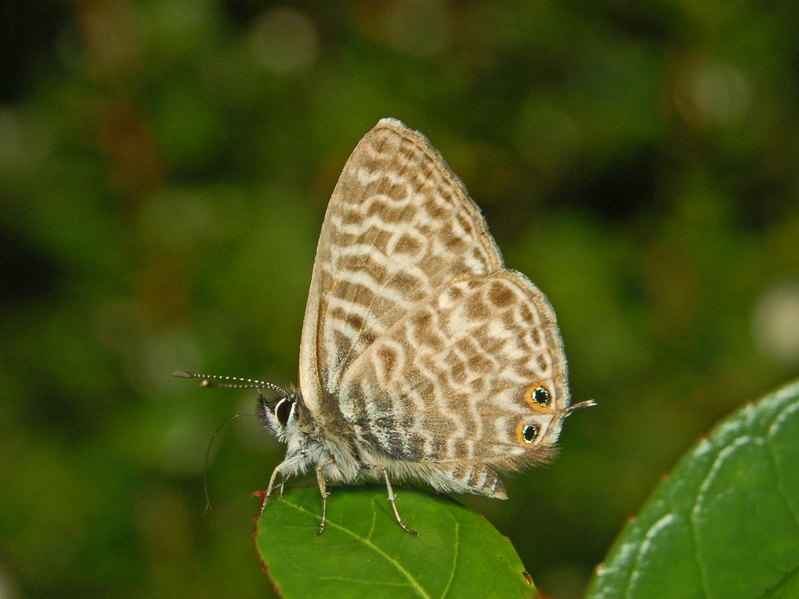
Leptotes pirithous
