= Leptotes sanctithomae =

Scientific classification
- Kingdom: Animalia
- Phylum: Arthropoda
- Class: Insecta
- Order: Lepidoptera
- Family: Lycaenidae
- Genus: Leptotes
- Species: L. sanctithomae

Binomial name
- Leptotes sanctithomae (Sharpe, 1893)

Synonyms
- Catochrysops sancti-thomae Sharpe, 1893; Freyeria sanctithomae (Sharpe, 1893); Chilades sanctithomae (Sharpe, 1893); Syntarucus terrenus Joicey & Talbot, 1926; Leptotes terrenus (Joicey & Talbot, 1926)

Species of butterfly

Leptotes sanctithomae is a butterfly in the family Lycaenidae. It is found on São Tomé Island. The type locality is the settlement of São Nicolau, Mé-Zóchi District. It was described by Emily Mary Bowdler Sharpe in 1893.

This species had long remained enigmatic and was assigned to the genus Chilades until 2011, when it was ruled to be the same species as the one so far called Leptotes terrenus (Joicey & Talbot, 1926), and was moved to the genus Leptotes.
