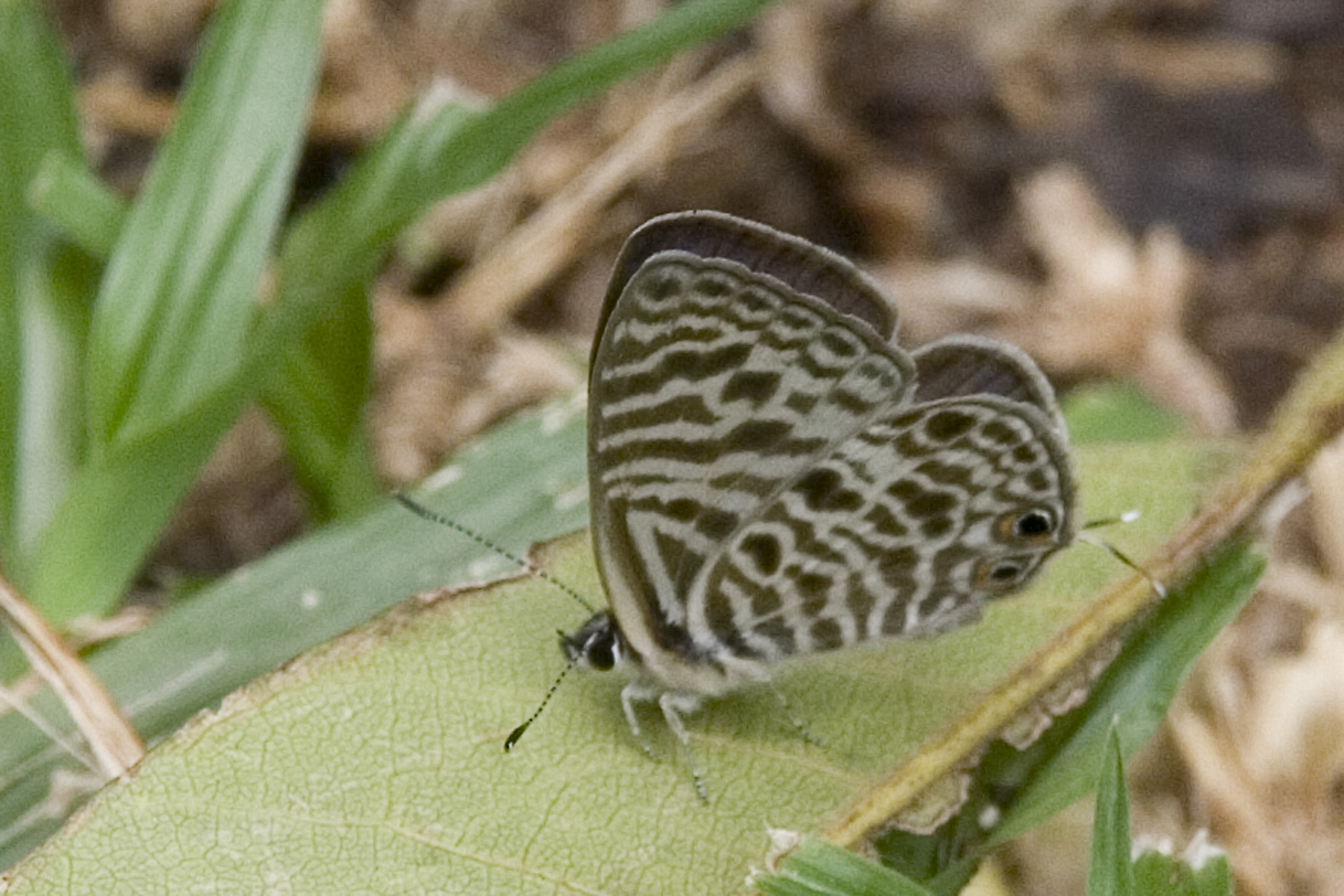

Scientific classification
- Domain: Eukaryota
- Kingdom: Animalia
- Phylum: Arthropoda
- Class: Insecta
- Order: Lepidoptera
- Family: Lycaenidae
- Genus: Leptotes
- Species: L. babaulti

Binomial name
- Leptotes babaulti (Stempffer, 1935)

Synonyms
- Syntarucus babaulti Stempffer, 1935; Tarucus pulchra f. juncta Dufrane, 1953; Syntarucus babaulti f. ornata Dufrane, 1954

= Leptotes babaulti =

Species of butterfly

Leptotes babaulti, the Babault's zebra blue, is a butterfly of the family Lycaenidae. It is found in the Afrotropical realm. The habitat consists of savanna bushveld at 1,000 m and riverine bush to montane grassland at 1,900 m.

The wingspan is 22–29 mm for males and 26–30 mm for females. Adults are on wing year-round, with a peak from November to April.
