= Leptotes mandersi =

Scientific classification
- Domain: Eukaryota
- Kingdom: Animalia
- Phylum: Arthropoda
- Class: Insecta
- Order: Lepidoptera
- Family: Lycaenidae
- Genus: Leptotes
- Species: L. mandersi

Binomial name
- Leptotes mandersi (H. H. Druce, 1907)

Synonyms
- Nacaduba mandersi H. H. Druce, 1907; Cyclyrius mandersi (H. H. Druce, 1907)

Species of butterfly

Leptotes mandersi is a butterfly in the family Lycaenidae first described by Hamilton Herbert Druce in 1907. It is endemic to Mauritius. The habitat consists of coastal areas.

The larvae feed on Caesalpinia bonduc.
