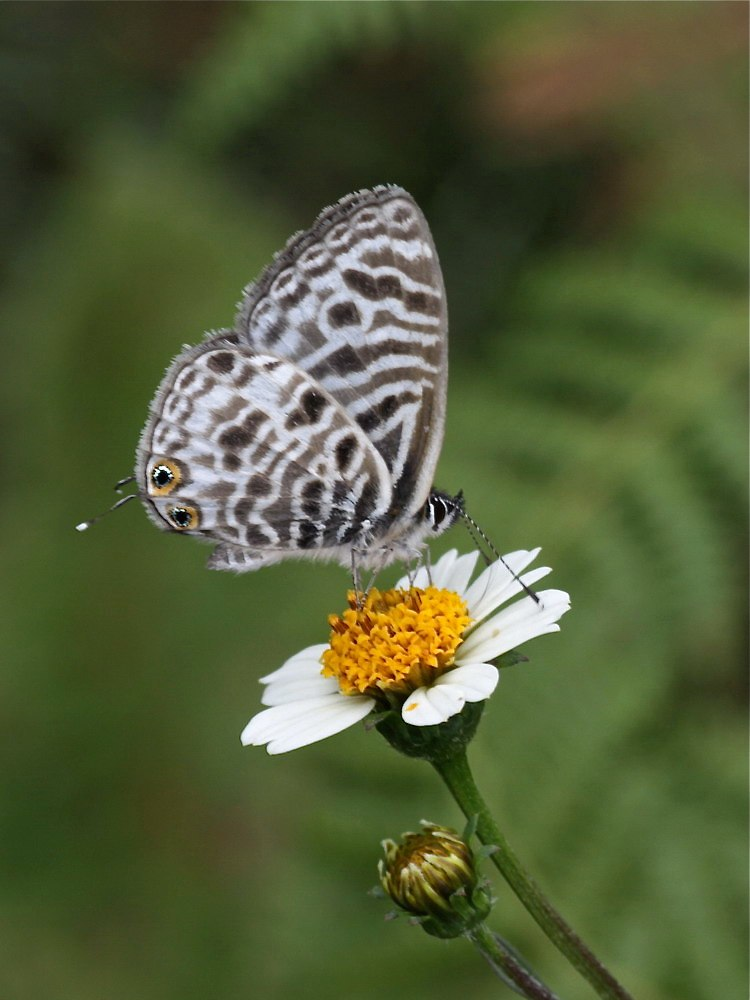

Scientific classification
- Domain: Eukaryota
- Kingdom: Animalia
- Phylum: Arthropoda
- Class: Insecta
- Order: Lepidoptera
- Family: Lycaenidae
- Genus: Leptotes
- Species: L. brevidentatus

Binomial name
- Leptotes brevidentatus (Tite, 1958)

Synonyms
- Syntarucus brevidentatus Tite, 1958

= Leptotes brevidentatus =

Species of butterfly

Leptotes brevidentatus, the short-toothed blue or Tite's zebra blue, is a butterfly of the family Lycaenidae. It is found in Africa south of the Sahara and south-western Arabia.

The wingspan is 22–29 mm for males and 26–30 mm for females. Adults are on wing year-round in warmer areas and from October to March in cooler areas.

The larvae feed on flowers and immature seeds of Plumbago auriculata and probably also Indigofera, Rhynchosia, Vigna, Burkea, Mundulea, Melilotus, Crataegus and Medicago sativa.
