= Leptotes jeanneli =

Scientific classification
- Domain: Eukaryota
- Kingdom: Animalia
- Phylum: Arthropoda
- Class: Insecta
- Order: Lepidoptera
- Family: Lycaenidae
- Genus: Leptotes
- Species: L. jeanneli

Binomial name
- Leptotes jeanneli (Stempffer, 1935)

Synonyms
- Syntarucus jeanneli Stempffer, 1935

Species of butterfly

Leptotes jeanneli, the Jeannel's blue, is a butterfly of the family Lycaenidae.

== Description ==
The wingspan is 22–29 mm for males and 26–30 mm for females. Adults are on wing year-round, with a peak from November to April.

== Habitat ==
It is found in Africa south of the Sahara in the countries Benin, Kenya, Ghana, Burkina Faso, Guinea, Nigeria, Senegal, South Africa, Yemen, Zambia and Zimbabwe.
