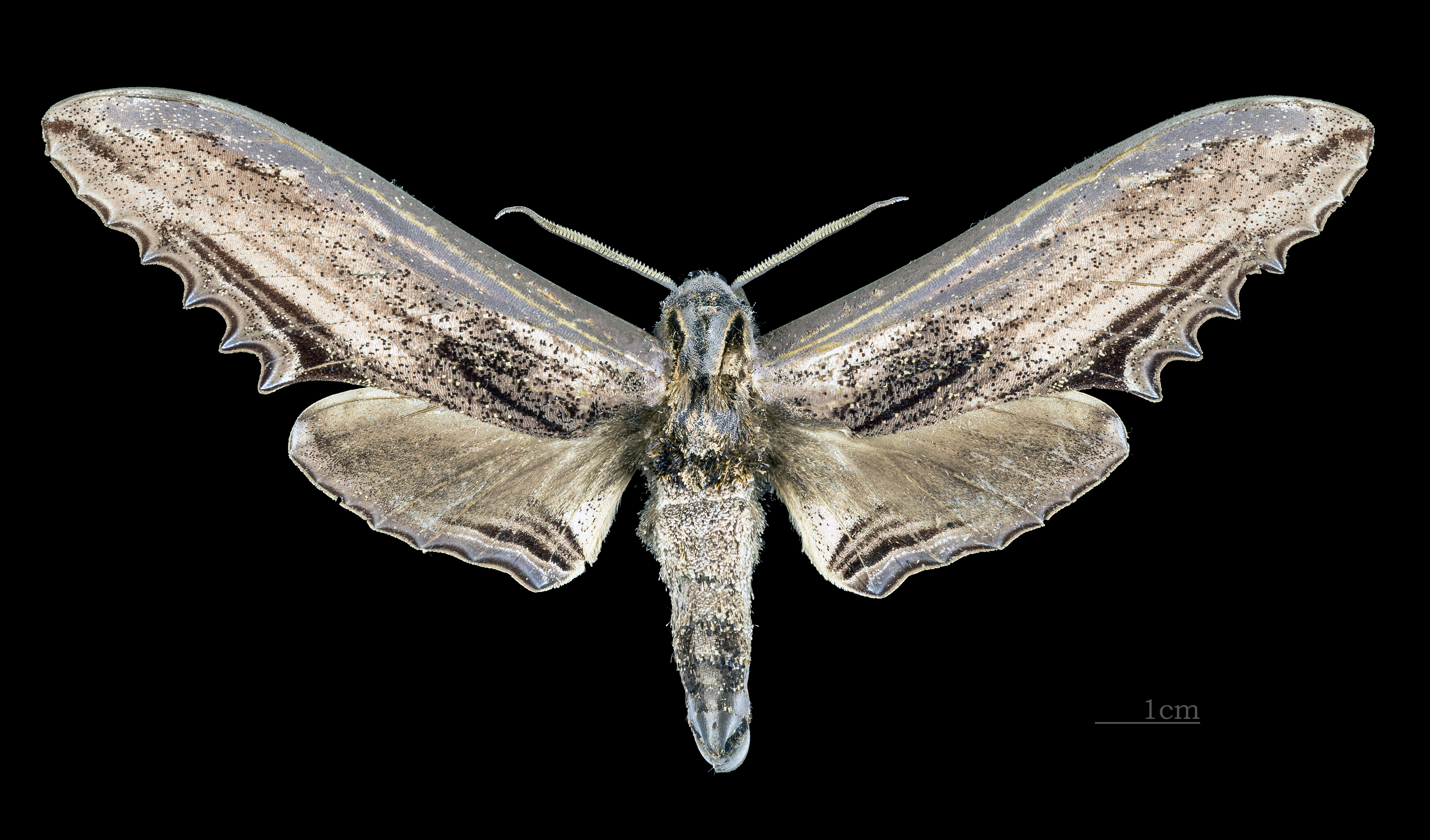
- Male Langia zenzeroides zenzeroides

Scientific classification
- Domain: Eukaryota
- Kingdom: Animalia
- Phylum: Arthropoda
- Class: Insecta
- Order: Lepidoptera
- Family: Sphingidae
- Genus: Langia
- Species: L. zenzeroides

Binomial name
- Langia zenzeroides Moore, 1872

Synonyms
- Langia khasiana Moore, 1872; Langia zenzeroides nina Mell, 1922; Langia zenzeroides szechuana Chu & Wang, 1980; Langia zenzeroides kunmingensis Zhao, 1984

= Langia zenzeroides =

Species of moth

Langia zenzeroides, the apple hawkmoth, is a species of moth in the family Sphingidae. It was described by Frederic Moore in 1872.

== Distribution ==
It is found in northern India, eastern and southern China, South Korea, northern Thailand, northern Vietnam, Japan and Taiwan.

== Description ==
The wingspan is 100–156 mm.

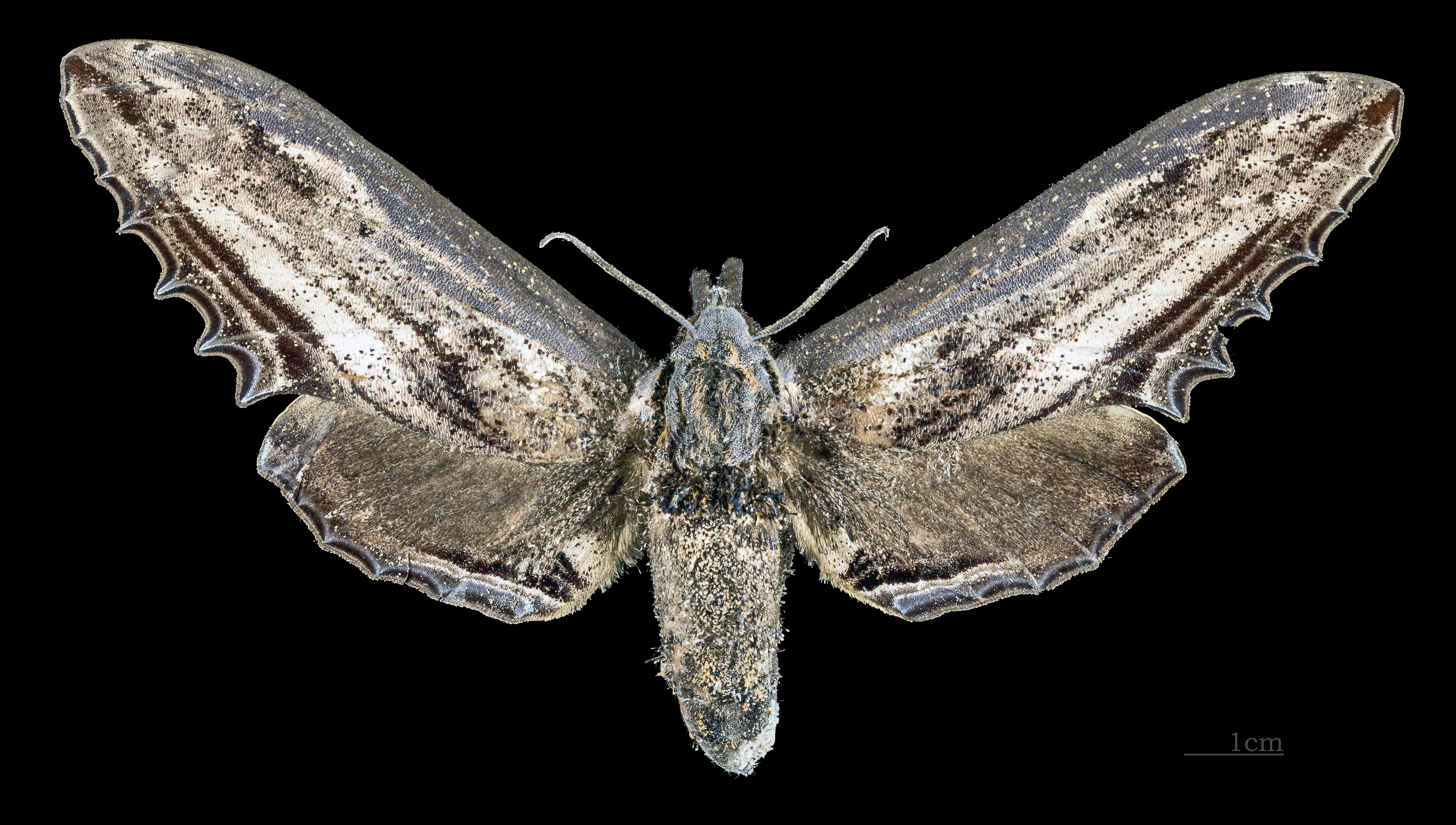
Female Langia zenzeroides zenzeroides, dorsal view

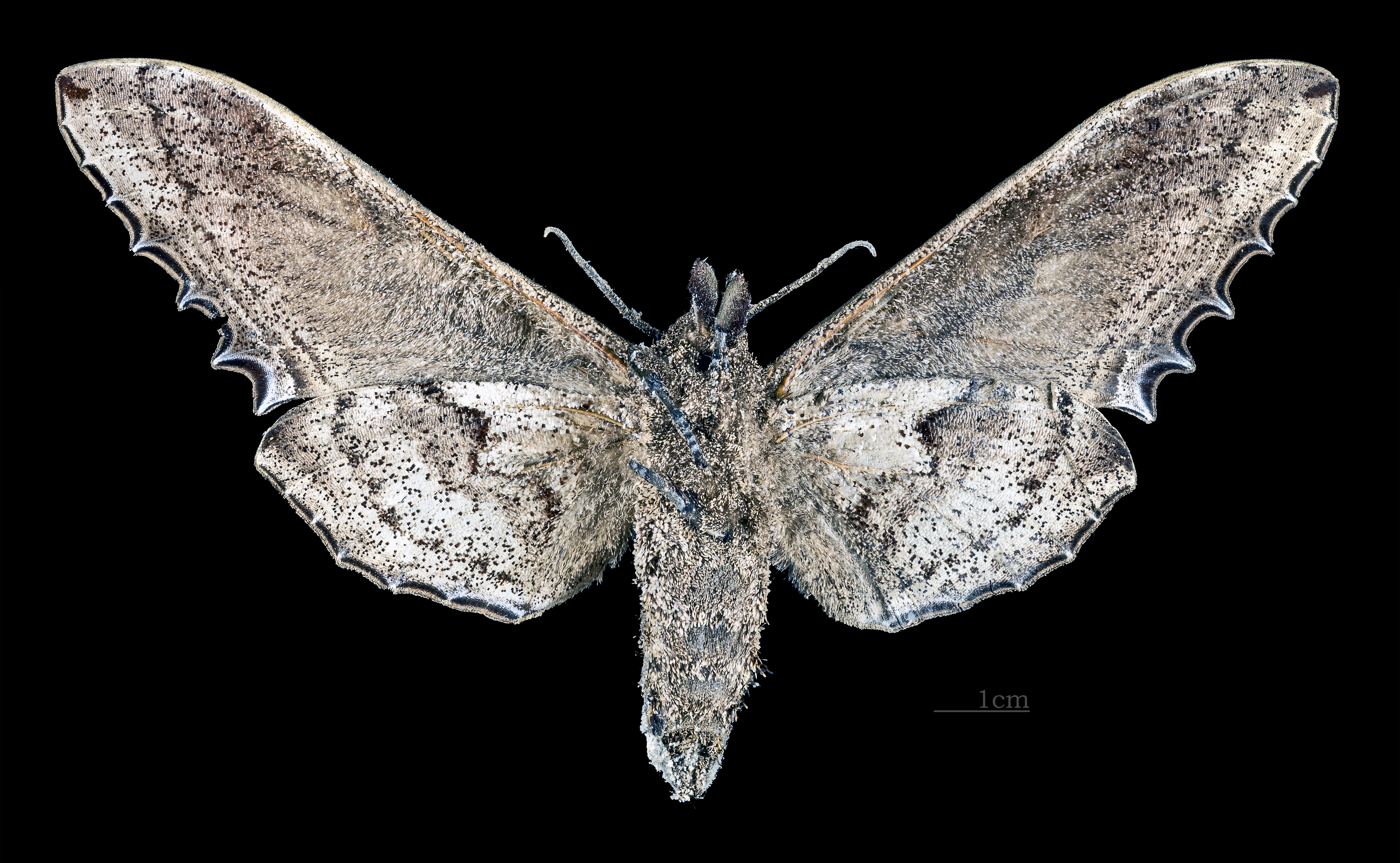
Female Langia zenzeroides zenzeroides, ventral view

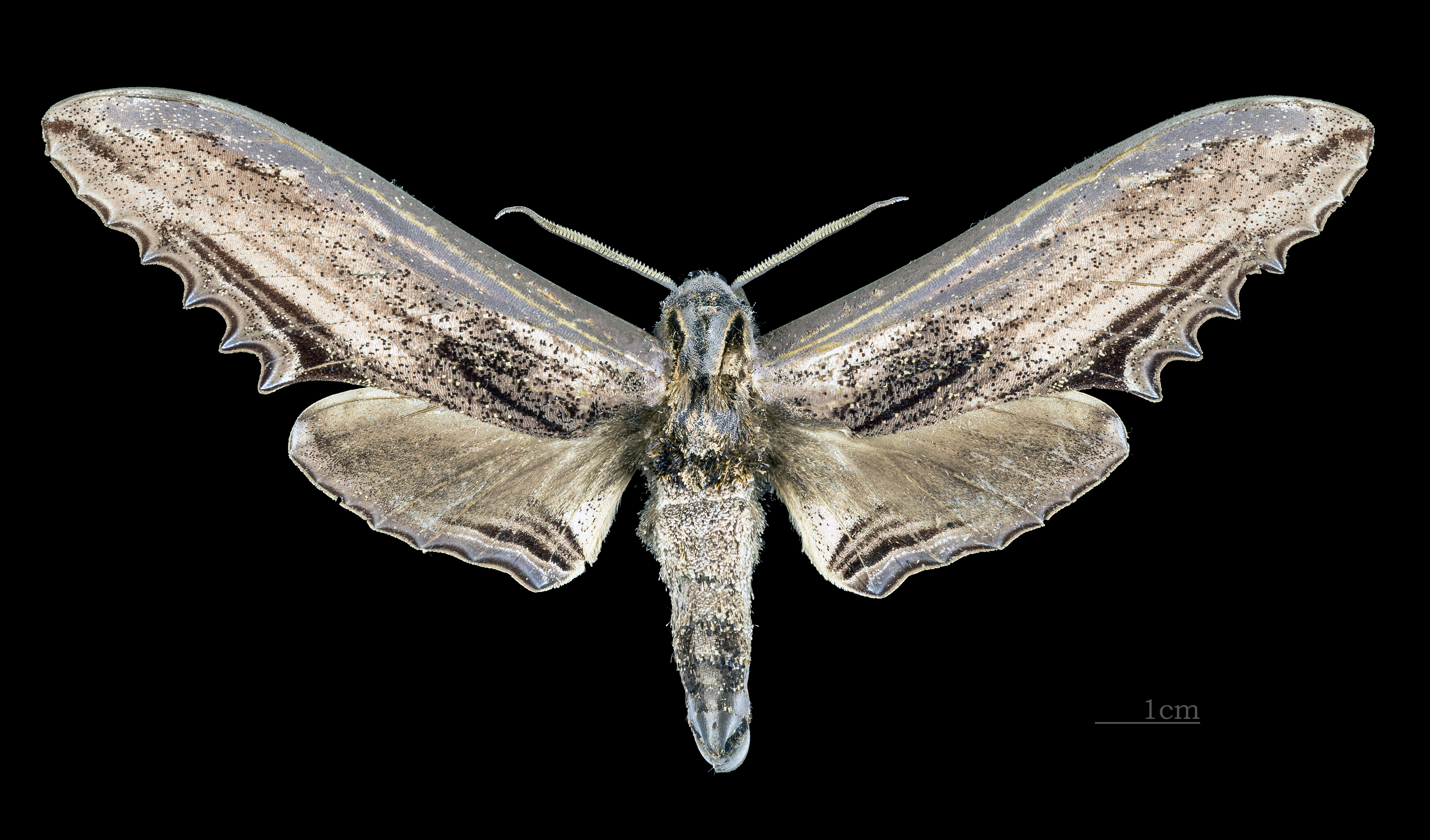
Male Langia zenzeroides zenzeroides, dorsal view

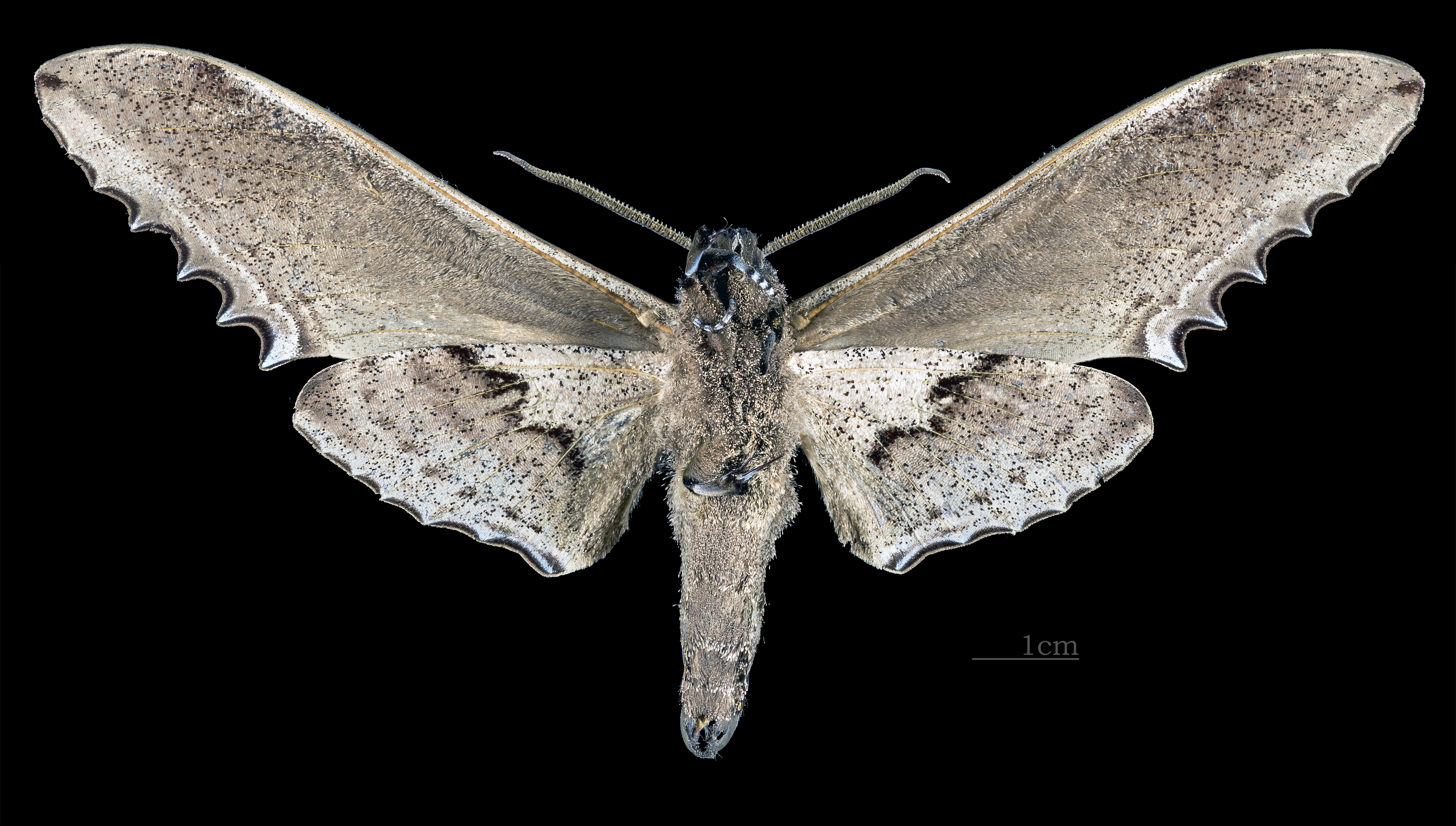
Male Langia zenzeroides zenzeroides, ventral view

== Biology ==
In northern China, there is one generation per year, with adults on wing from April to May. In Korea, adults have been recorded from late April to mid-May and in Thailand, the main flight period is January and February. They also are very large compared to a regular moth.

The larvae have been recorded on Prunus persica, but feed on most woody Rosaceae species, such as cherries, apples, pears and medlars.

== Subspecies ==
- Langia zenzeroides zenzeroides (northern India, eastern and southern China, South Korea, northern Thailand and northern Vietnam)
- Langia zenzeroides nawai Rothschild & Jordan, 1903 (Japan)
- Langia zenzeroides formosana Clark, 1936 (mountains of Taiwan)
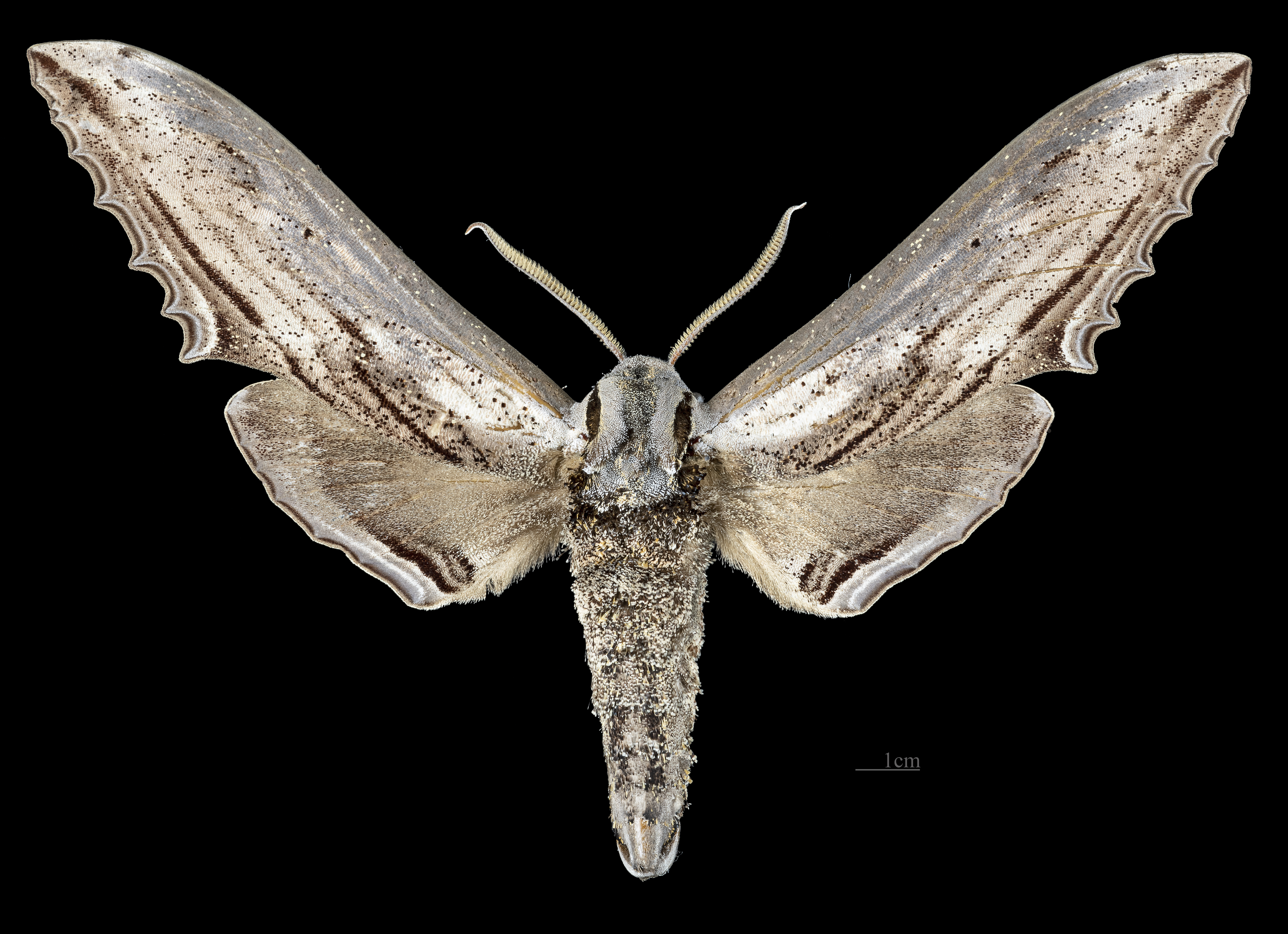
Male Langia zenzeroides formosana

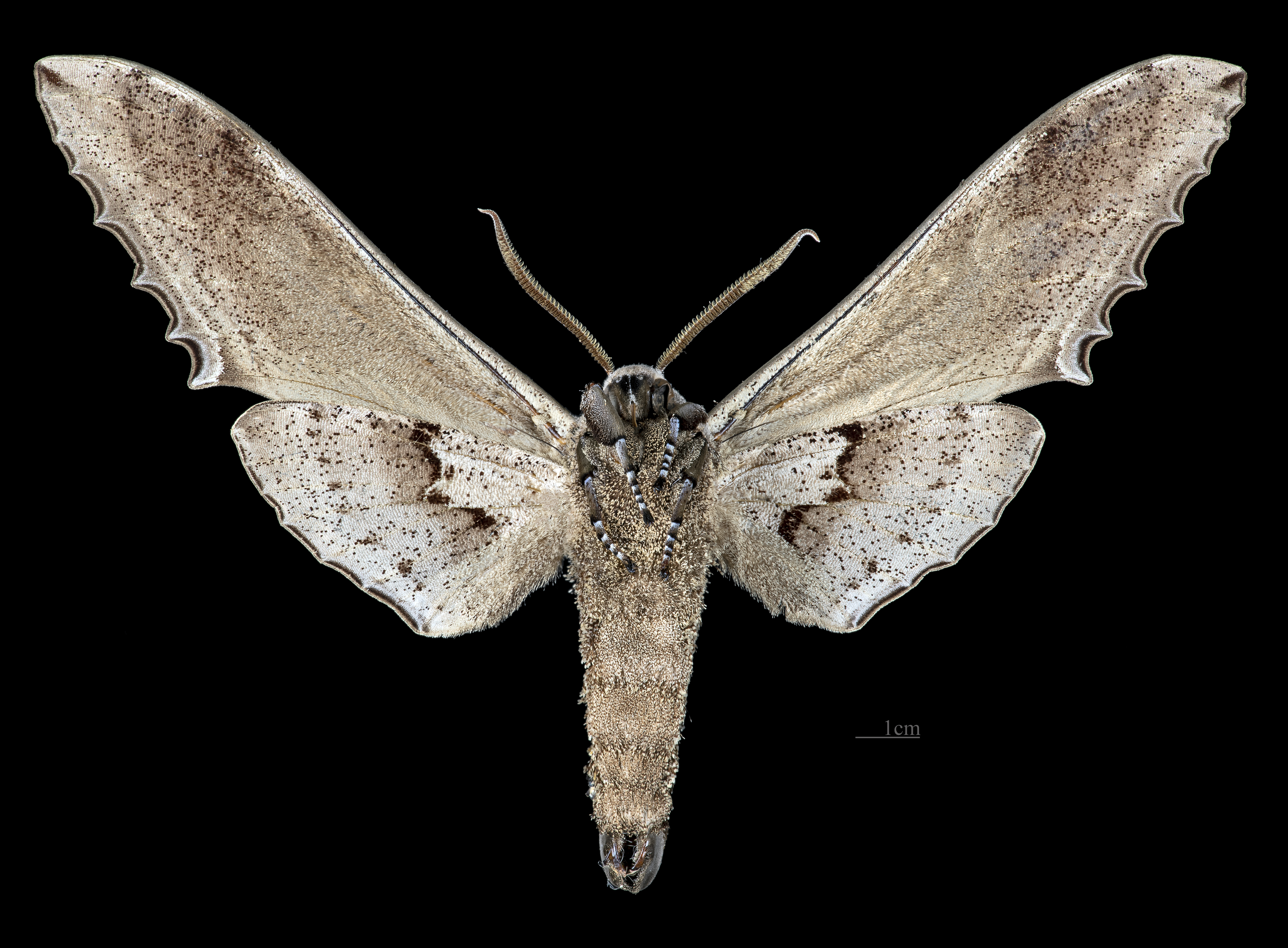
Male Langia zenzeroides formosana, underside

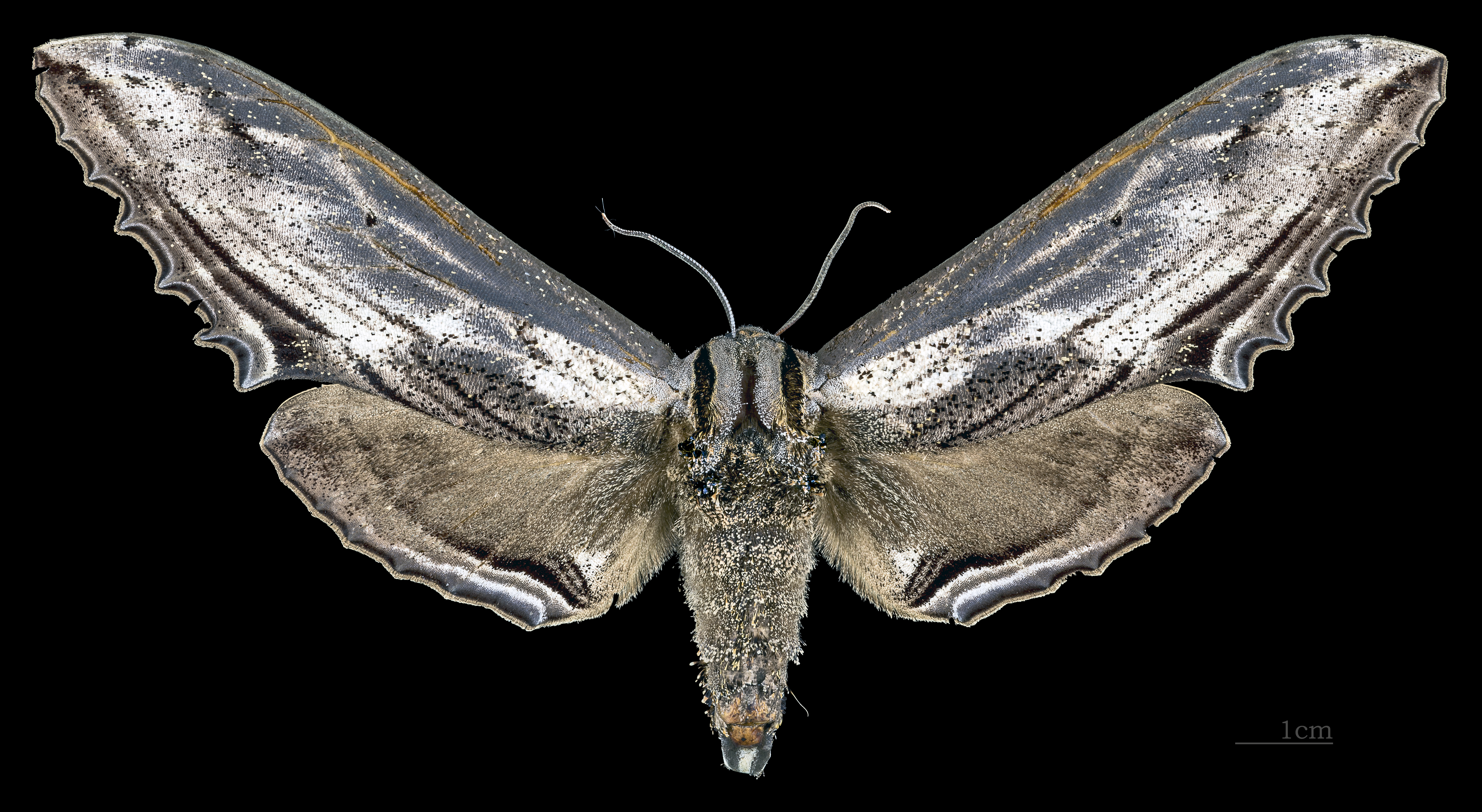
Female Langia zenzeroides formosana

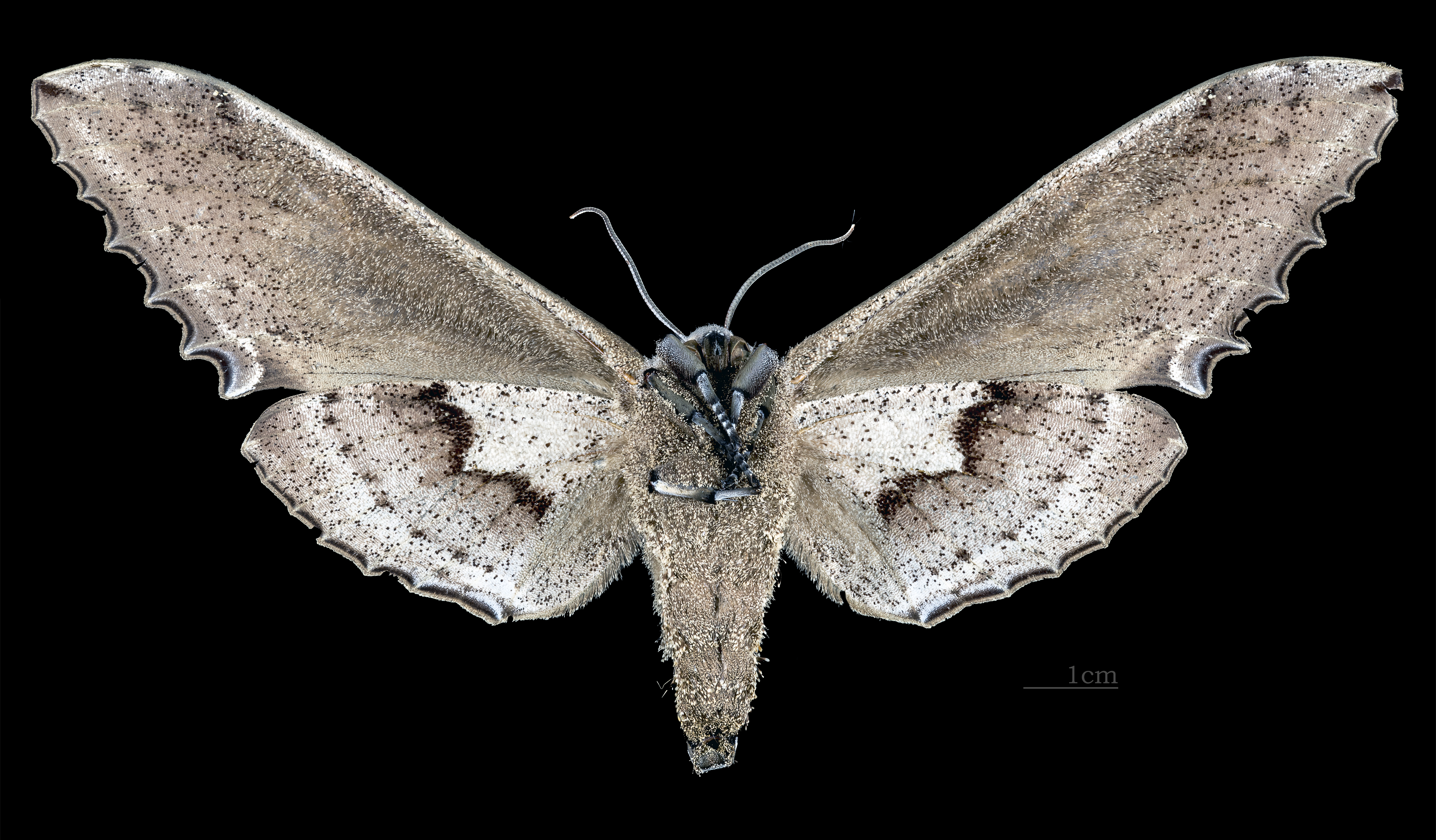
Female Langia zenzeroides formosana, underside

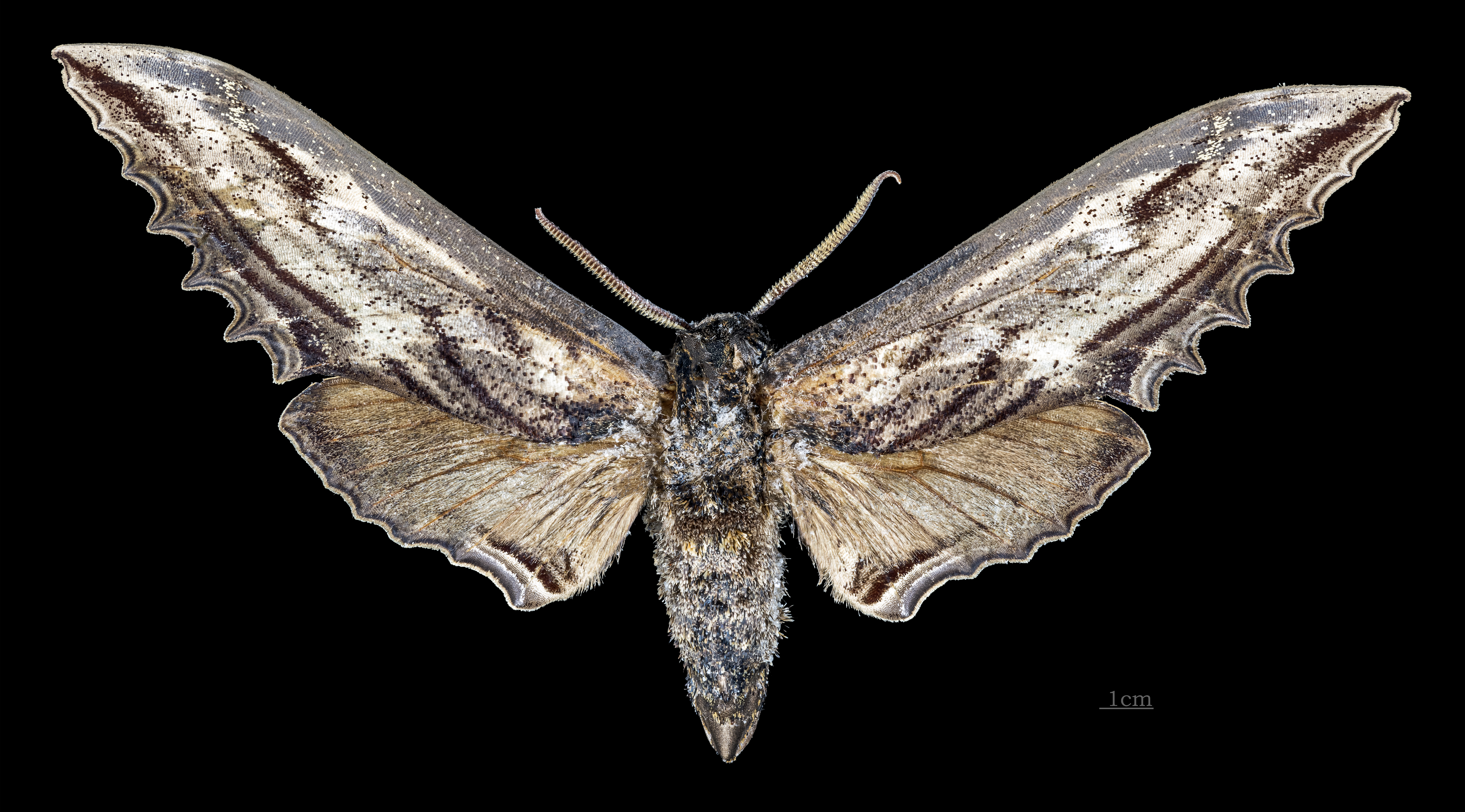
Male Langia zenzeroides nawai

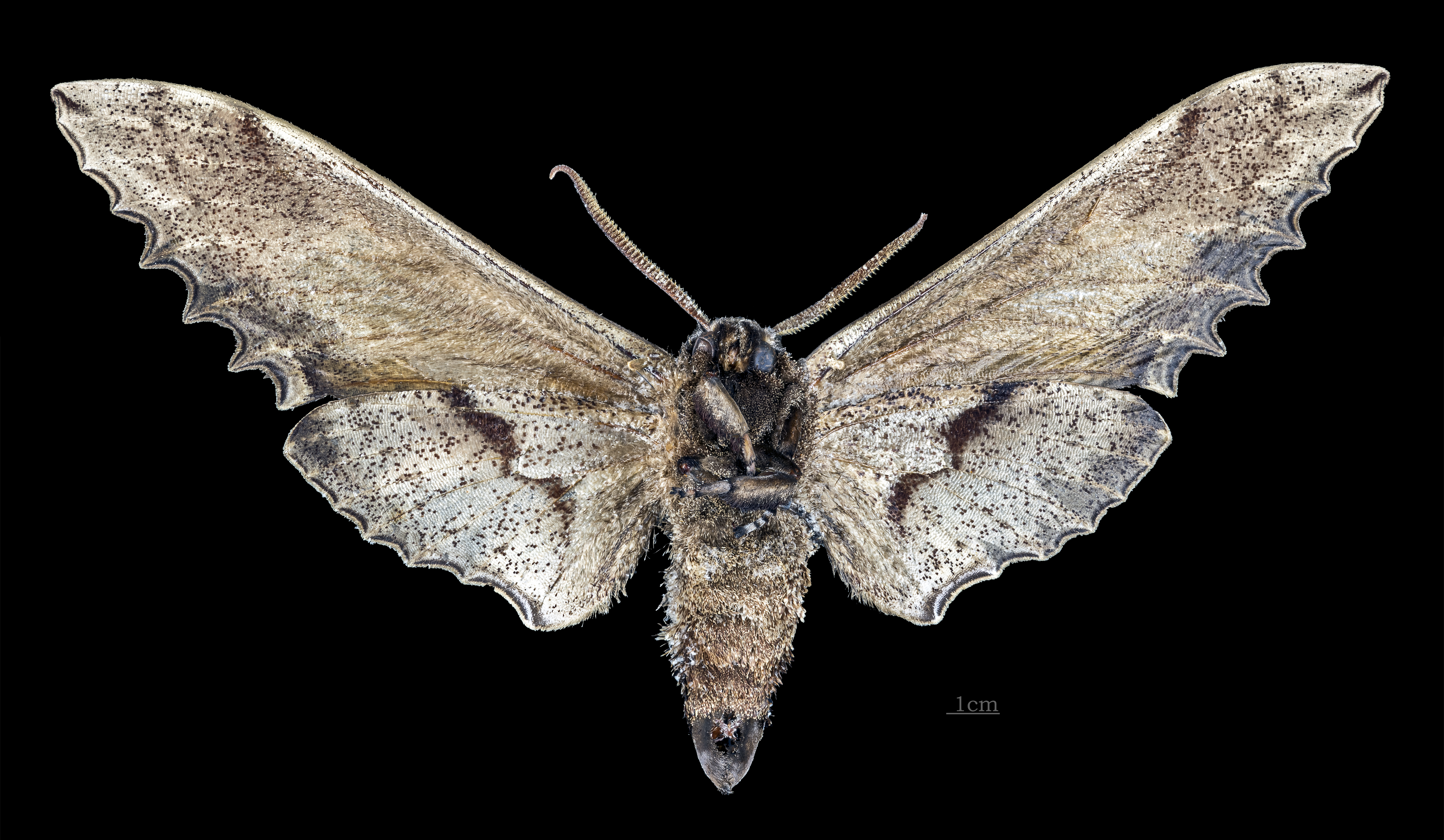
Male Langia zenzeroides nawai underside
