= Leptotes socotranus =

Scientific classification
- Domain: Eukaryota
- Kingdom: Animalia
- Phylum: Arthropoda
- Class: Insecta
- Order: Lepidoptera
- Family: Lycaenidae
- Genus: Leptotes
- Species: L. socotranus

Binomial name
- Leptotes socotranus (Ogilvie-Grant, 1899)

Synonyms
- Tarucus socotranus Ogilvie-Grant, 1899

Species of butterfly

Leptotes socotranus is a butterfly in the family Lycaenidae. It is found on Socotra in the Arabian Sea.
