= Leptotes pulcher =

Scientific classification
- Domain: Eukaryota
- Kingdom: Animalia
- Phylum: Arthropoda
- Class: Insecta
- Order: Lepidoptera
- Family: Lycaenidae
- Genus: Leptotes
- Species: L. pulcher

Binomial name
- Leptotes pulcher (Murray, 1874)

Synonyms
- Lycaena pulchra Murray, 1874; Leptotes pulchra; Tarucus pulchra f. deficiens Dufrane, 1953

Species of butterfly

Leptotes pulcher, the beautiful zebra blue, is a butterfly of the family Lycaenidae. It is found in Africa south of the Sahara.

The wingspan is 18–24 mm for males and 18–26 mm for females. Adults are on wing year-round, with a peak from November to May in the north and probably only the warmer months in South Africa.

The larvae feed on Sesbania sesban.
