= Leptotes mayottensis =

Scientific classification
- Domain: Eukaryota
- Kingdom: Animalia
- Phylum: Arthropoda
- Class: Insecta
- Order: Lepidoptera
- Family: Lycaenidae
- Genus: Leptotes
- Species: L. mayottensis

Binomial name
- Leptotes mayottensis (Tite, 1958)

Synonyms
- Syntarucus mayottensis Tite, 1958

Species of butterfly

Leptotes mayottensis is a butterfly in the family Lycaenidae. It is found on the Comoros in the Indian Ocean.
