= Leptotes adamsoni =

Scientific classification
- Kingdom: Animalia
- Phylum: Arthropoda
- Class: Insecta
- Order: Lepidoptera
- Family: Lycaenidae
- Genus: Leptotes
- Species: L. adamsoni

Binomial name
- Leptotes adamsoni Collins & Larsen, 1991

Species of butterfly

Leptotes adamsoni, the Adamson's zebra blue, is a butterfly in the family Lycaenidae. It is found in Kenya (near Kora Town and the Tana River). The habitat consists of riverine vegetation with Cordia sinensis as the dominant plant.

Adults have been recorded feeding from the flowers of a Premna species.
