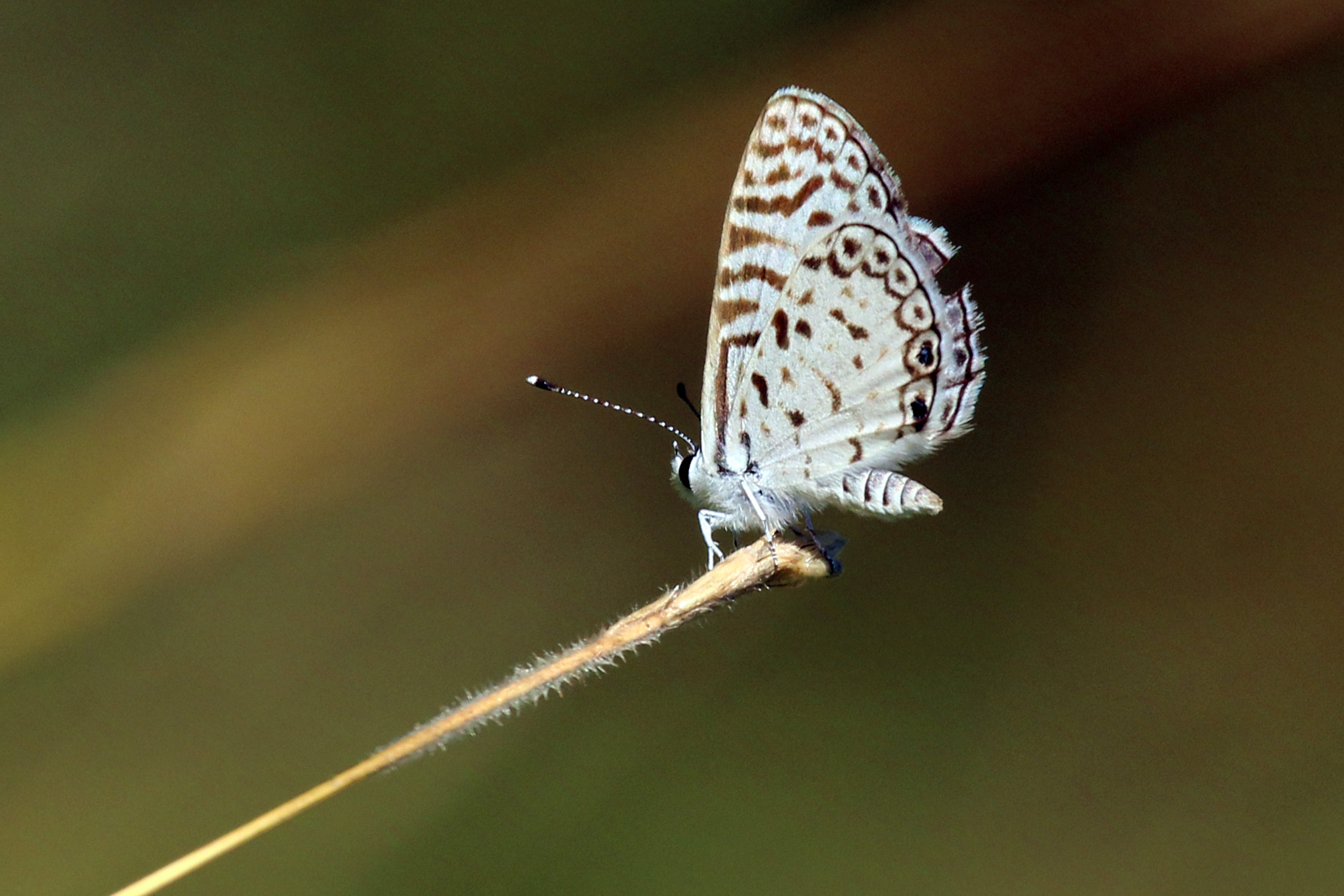

Scientific classification
- Kingdom: Animalia
- Phylum: Arthropoda
- Class: Insecta
- Order: Lepidoptera
- Family: Lycaenidae
- Genus: Leptotes
- Species: L. cassioides

Binomial name
- Leptotes cassioides (Capronnier, 1889)

Synonyms
- Lycaena cassioides Capronnier, 1889

= Leptotes cassioides =

Species of butterfly

Leptotes cassioides is a butterfly in the family Lycaenidae. It is found in the Democratic Republic of the Congo.
