= Leptotes marginalis =

Scientific classification
- Domain: Eukaryota
- Kingdom: Animalia
- Phylum: Arthropoda
- Class: Insecta
- Order: Lepidoptera
- Family: Lycaenidae
- Genus: Leptotes
- Species: L. marginalis

Binomial name
- Leptotes marginalis (Stempffer, 1944)

Synonyms
- Syntarucus marginalis Stempffer, [1944]; Cupido telicanus ab. marginalis Aurivillius, 1924

Species of butterfly

Leptotes marginalis, the black-bordered zebra blue, is a butterfly in the family Lycaenidae. It is found in Sudan, Uganda, Kenya, the Democratic Republic of the Congo (South Kivu and Lualaba), Rwanda, Burundi, Tanzania and Zambia.
