= Leptotes casca =

Scientific classification
- Domain: Eukaryota
- Kingdom: Animalia
- Phylum: Arthropoda
- Class: Insecta
- Order: Lepidoptera
- Family: Lycaenidae
- Genus: Leptotes
- Species: L. casca

Binomial name
- Leptotes casca (Tite, 1958)

Synonyms
- Syntarucus casca Tite, 1958

Species of butterfly

Leptotes casca is a butterfly in the family Lycaenidae. It is found on the Comoros in the Indian Ocean.
