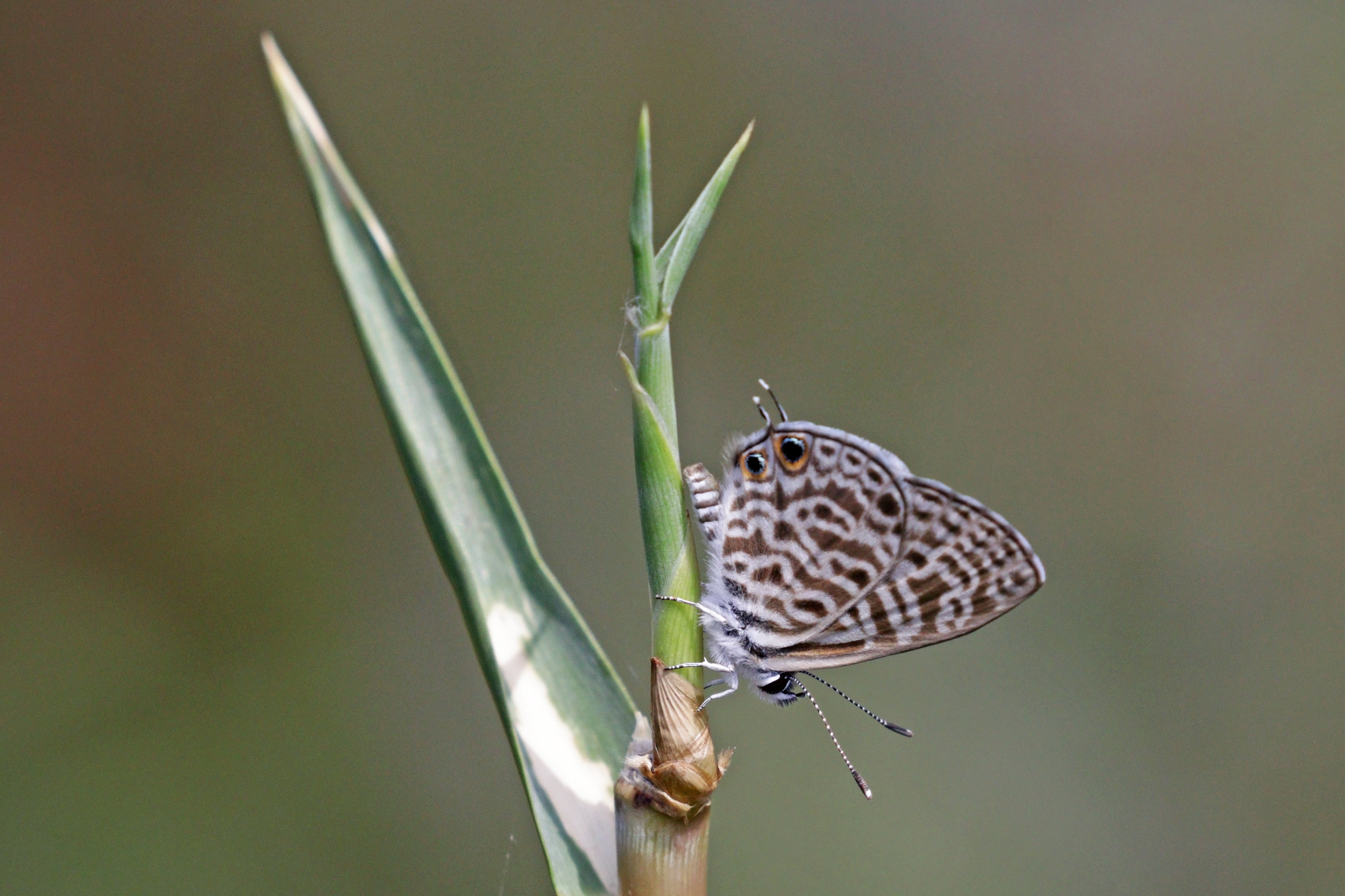
- Anja Community Reserve, Madagascar

Scientific classification
- Domain: Eukaryota
- Kingdom: Animalia
- Phylum: Arthropoda
- Class: Insecta
- Order: Lepidoptera
- Family: Lycaenidae
- Genus: Leptotes
- Species: L. rabefaner

Binomial name
- Leptotes rabefaner (Mabille, 1877)

Synonyms
- Lycaena rabefaner Mabille, 1877

= Leptotes rabefaner =

Species of butterfly

Leptotes rabefaner, the Madagascar zebra blue, is a butterfly in the family Lycaenidae. It is found on Madagascar. The habitat consists of forests and forest margins.
