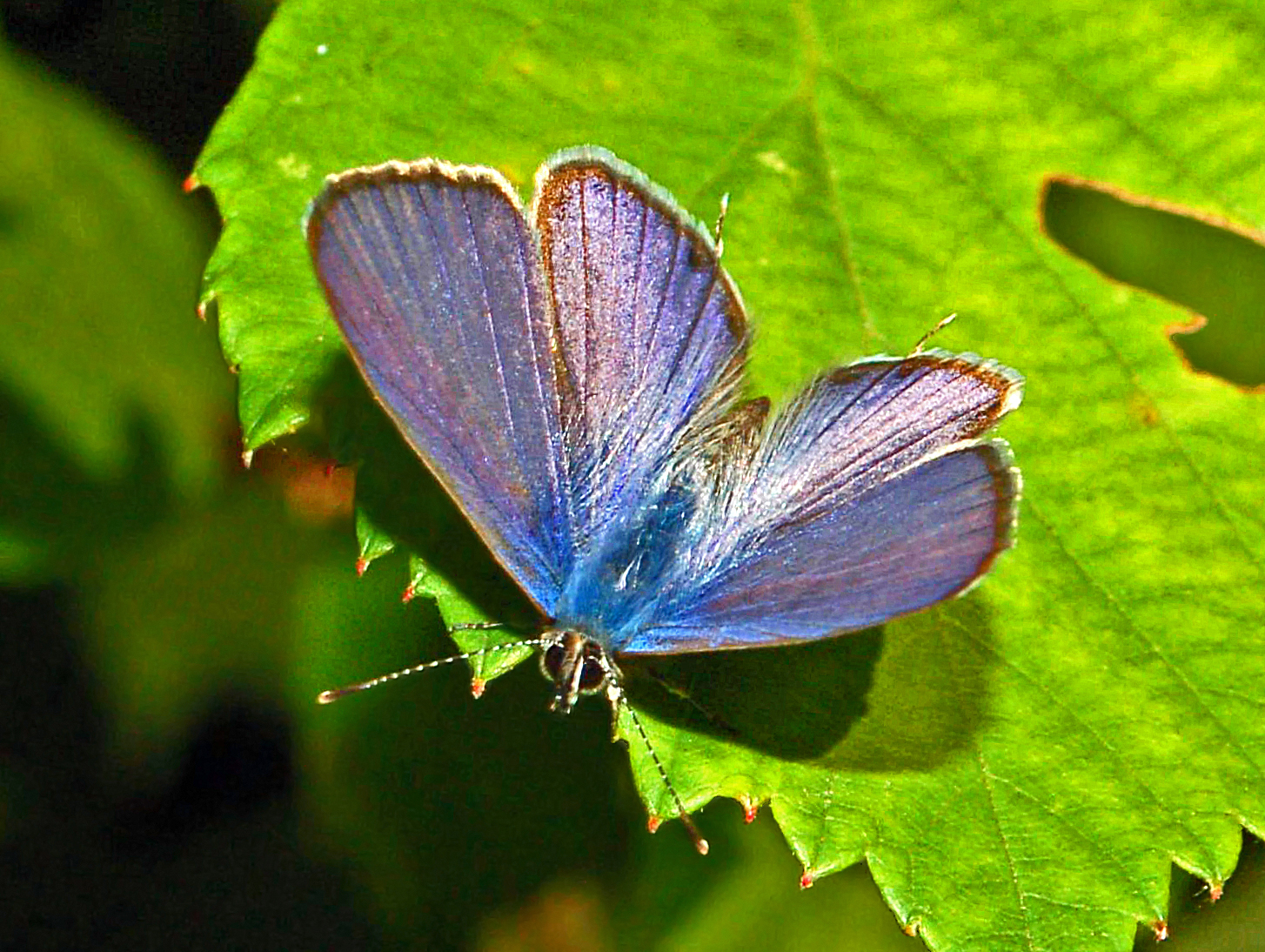
- Male, dorsal view, Italy
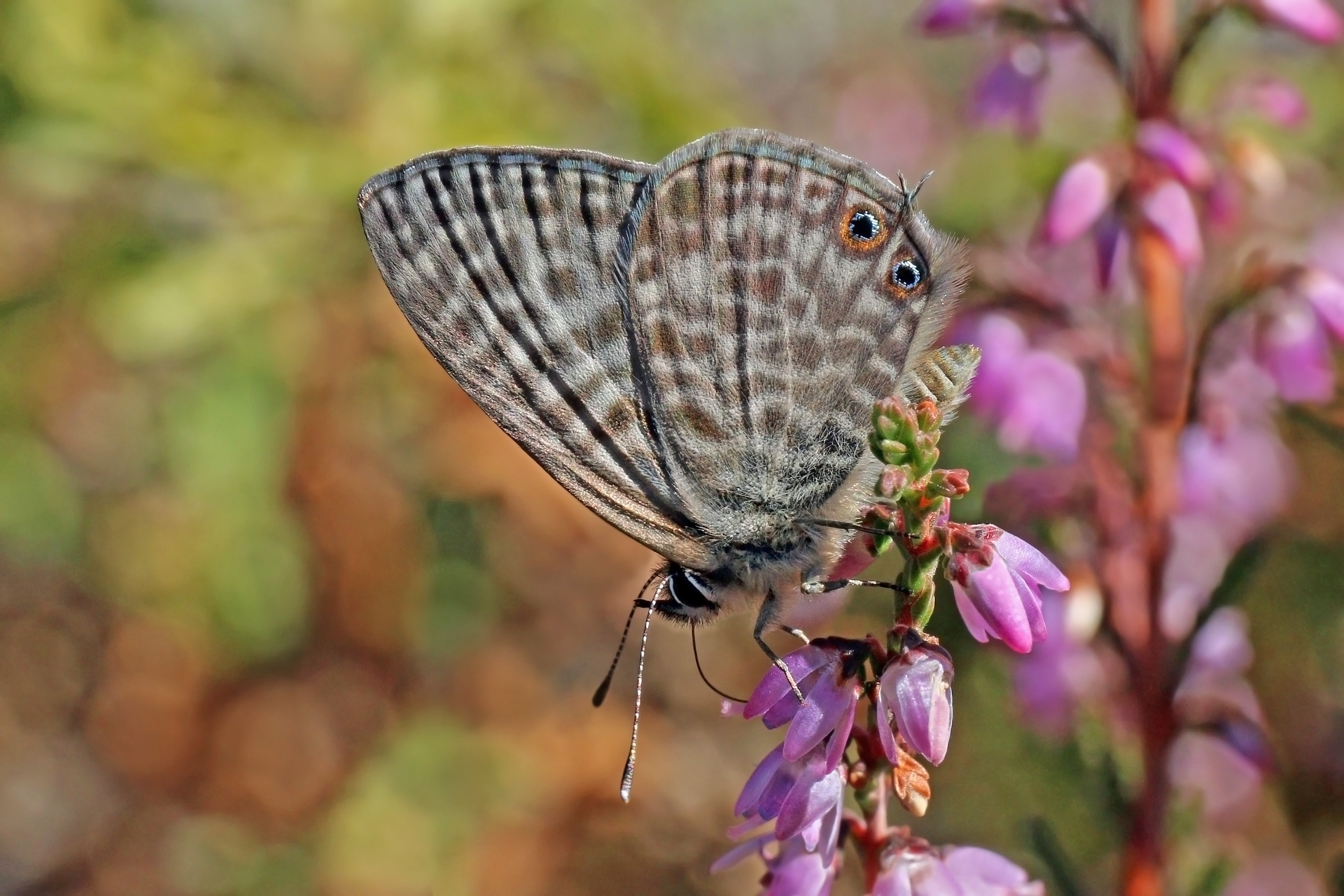
- Male ventral view, Portugal

Scientific classification
- Kingdom: Animalia
- Phylum: Arthropoda
- Clade: Pancrustacea
- Class: Insecta
- Order: Lepidoptera
- Family: Lycaenidae
- Genus: Leptotes
- Species: L. pirithous

Binomial name
- Leptotes pirithous (Linnaeus, 1767)

Synonyms
- Lampides telicanus (Lang, 1789); Papilio pirithous Linnaeus, 1767; Papilio telicanus Lang, 1789; Syntarucus pirithous; Papilio plinius Fabricius, 1793; Cupido telicanus f. insulana Aurivillius, 1909

= Leptotes pirithous =

Species of butterfly

Leptotes pirithous, commonly known as Lang's short-tailed blue or common zebra blue, is a butterfly of the family Lycaenidae.

== Description ==
Leptotes pirithous is a small butterfly with a wingspan of 21–29 mm (0.83–1.14 in) in males and 24–30 mm (0.94–1.18 in) in females. The uppersides of the wings are purple bluish in males, bluish brown in female. The undersides are dark beige striped with white lines. The hindwings show marginal orange and black spots and two small tails. For the design of the undersides of the wings they can be confused with Lampides boeticus and Cacyreus marshalli.

== Description in Seitz ==
T. telicanus Lang (? = pirithous L., baeticus Esp.) (77 h; the figure marked male represents a small female). (male violet-blue, female smoky grey with the disc of the forewing bluish white, the intricate markings of the underside appear also above. The underside has on a smoky grey ground a confusion of white lines and rings and around the anal spots of the hindwing very thin blue rings which glitter intensely. South Europe and North Africa, as well as Asia Minor. The form bellieri Ragusa, from Sicily has the underside more unicolorous, washed out. — Larva dark red, with black-lnown dorsal line and dark oblique stripes; in June and the autumn on Melilotus and Medicago, said to be found also on Calluna vulgaris. Pupa yellowish brown, with dark markings. The butterflies in the early spring and again late in summer, singly and usually not plentiful. They like to rest on clusters of Thymus and fly rather fast; they also appear to migrate in certain years, since the butterfhes, as rare exceptions, have been observed here and there in localities lying far north, for instance at Bale, Stuttgart, Augsburg, Bozen, etc. etc.

== Biology ==
These butterflies fly from February to November depending on the location. They are regular migrants.

The larvae feed on the flowers and fruits of Fabaceae, Rosaceae and Plumbaginaceae species, including Plumbago capensis, Indigofera, Rynchosia, Vigna, Burkea, Mundulea, Melilotus, Crataegus, Quercus suber, Medicago sativa, Trifolium alexandrinum, Arachis hypogaea, Lythrum, Calluna, Genista, Dorycnium, Lythrum salicaria, Calluna vulgaris, Onobrychis viciifolia, Ulex and Melilotus alba. A life cycle takes about four to eight weeks, depending on the temperature.

A courtship ritual in iSimangaliso Wetland Park, KwaZulu-Natal, South Africa

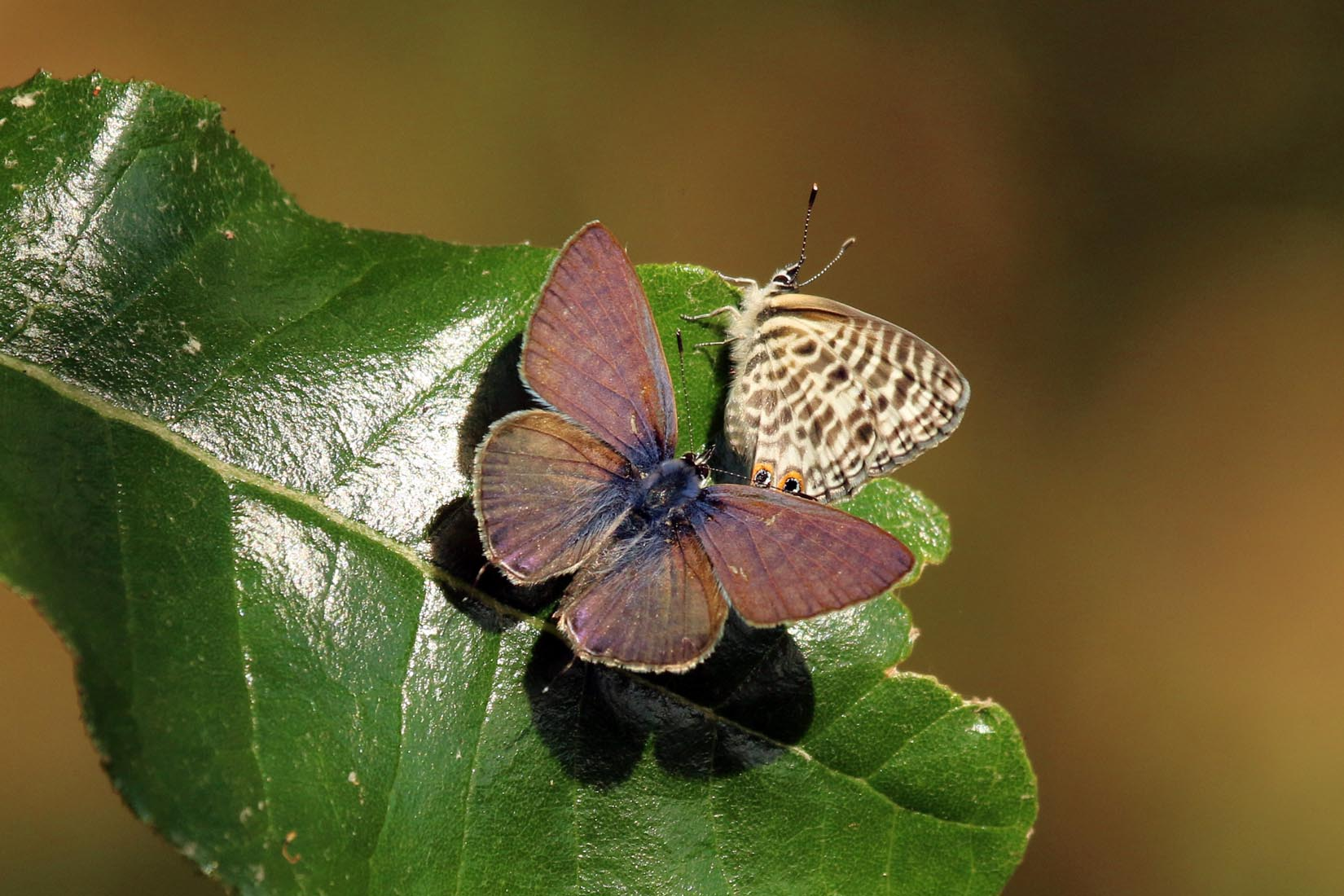
L. p. pirithous, 1 of 3
male on left

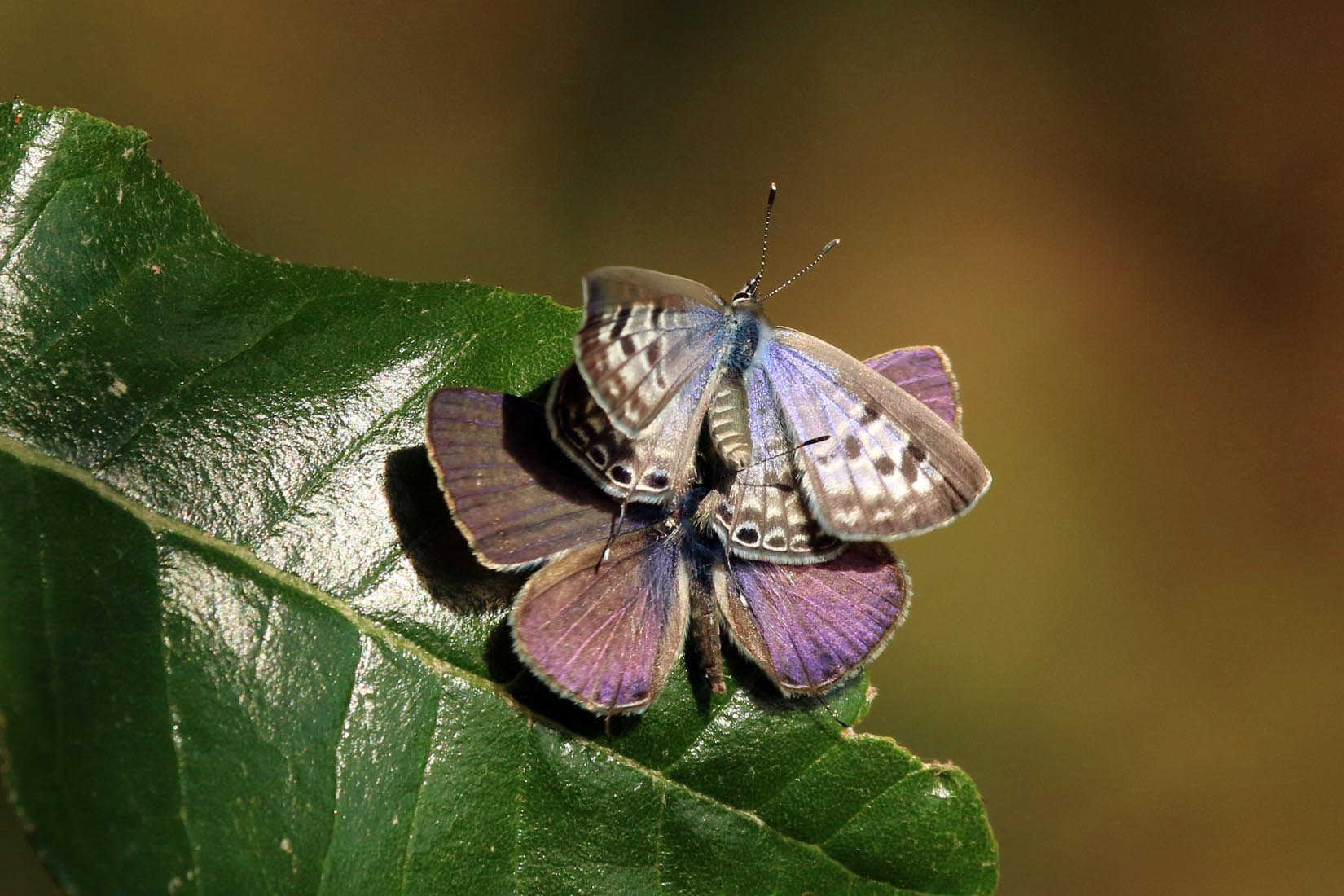
L. p. pirithous, 2 of 3
female covers male

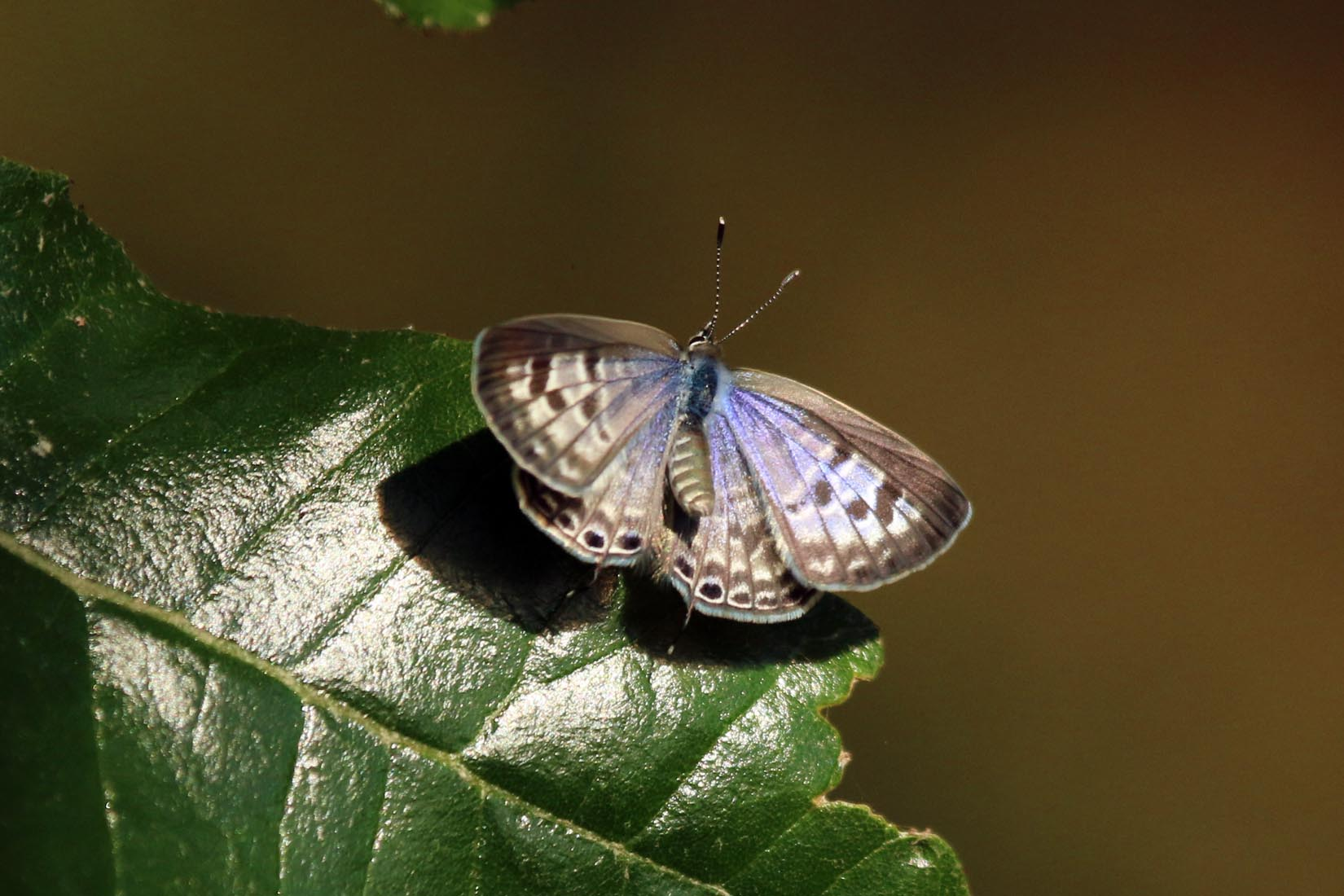
L. p. pirithous, 3 of 3
female on male

== Distribution ==
This species can be found in southern Europe (Spain, France and Italy), along the Mediterranean coast, in Asia Minor up to the Himalayas, and in most of Africa and Madagascar.

== Subspecies ==
The following subspecies have been identified:

- Leptotes pirithous pirithous (southern Europe, Caucasus, Transcaucasia, North Africa)
- Leptotes pirithous capverti Libert, Baliteau & Baliteau, 2011 (island of Santo Antão, Cape Verde)
- Leptotes pirithous insulanus (Aurivillius, 1924) (Mozambique Channel)

== Habitat ==
This species prefers varied natural habitats, cultivated areas and gardens.
