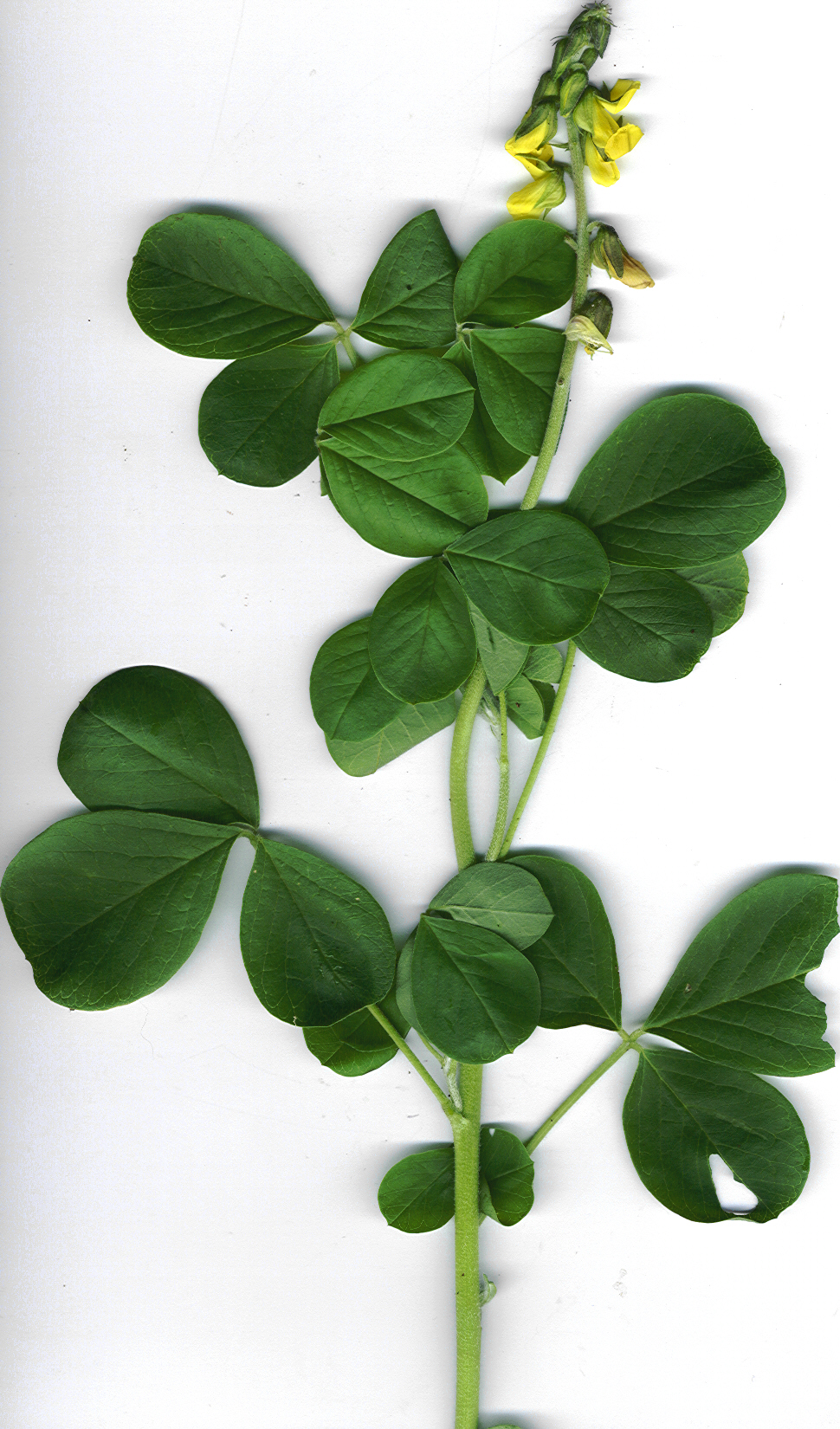

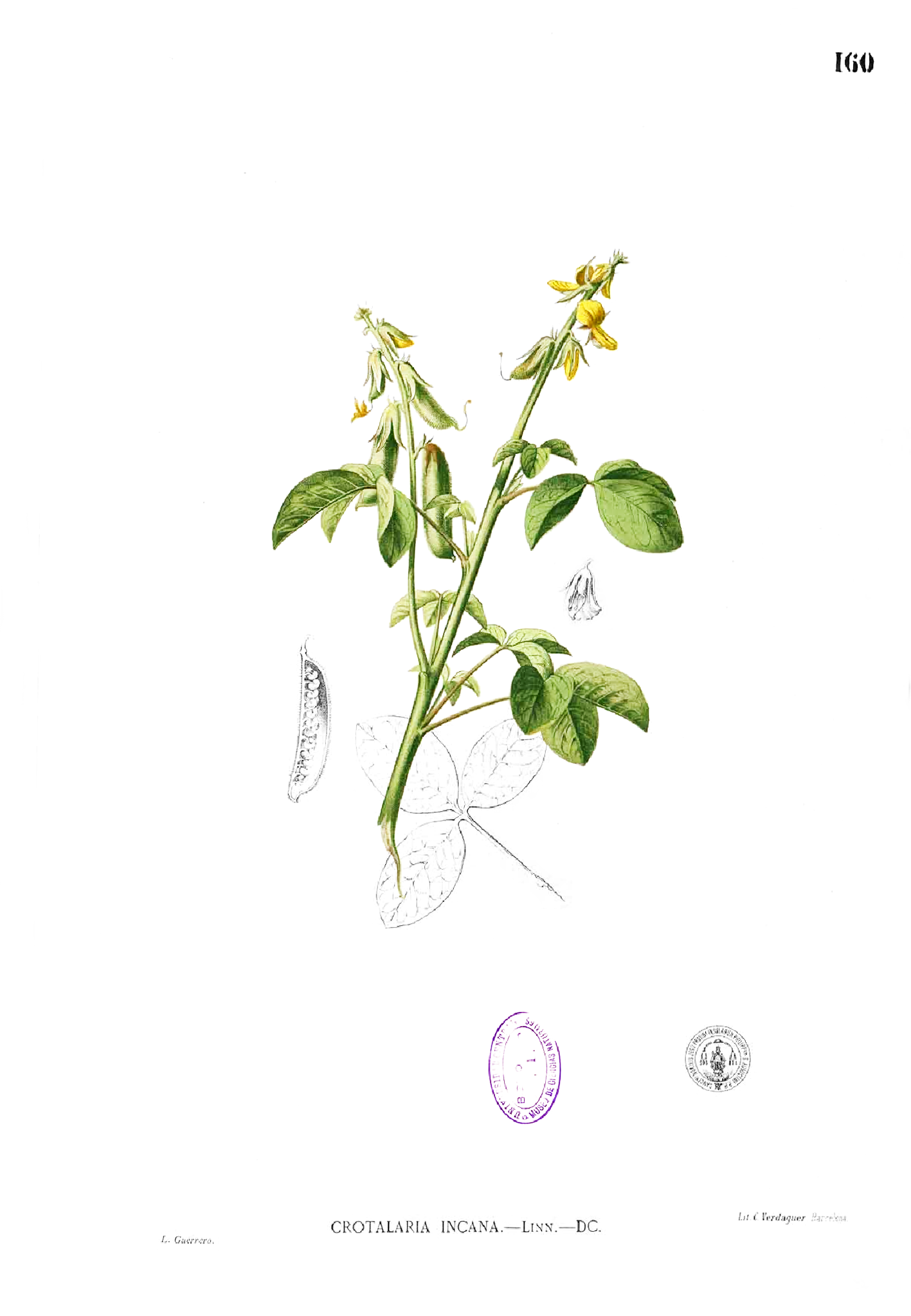

Scientific classification
- Kingdom: Plantae
- Clade: Tracheophytes
- Clade: Angiosperms
- Clade: Eudicots
- Clade: Rosids
- Order: Fabales
- Family: Fabaceae
- Subfamily: Faboideae
- Genus: Crotalaria
- Species: C. incana

Binomial name
- Crotalaria incana L.

= Crotalaria incana =

Species of flowering plant

Crotalaria incana is a species of flowering plant in the Fabaceae family known by various names including shake-shake, velvety rattlebox, silver rattlepod, and woolly rattlepod.

It grows in disturbed areas, primarily in the seasonally dry tropical biome.

The plant contains toxic alkaloids and is used in traditional medicine after preparation, as well as for poison.
