= List of butterflies of Sudan and South Sudan =

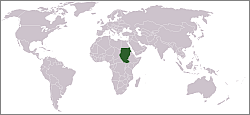
Location of Sudan

This is a list of butterflies of Sudan and South Sudan. About 341 species are known from the Sudans, 6 of which are endemic.

== Papilionidae ==
=== Papilioninae ===
==== Papilionini ====
- Papilio antimachus Drury, 1782
- Papilio zalmoxis Hewitson, 1864
- Papilio nireus lyaeus Doubleday, 1845
- Papilio nireus pseudonireus Felder & Felder, 1865
- Papilio plagiatus Aurivillius, 1898
- Papilio phorcas sudanicola Storace, 1965
- Papilio rex franciscae Carpenter, 1928
- Papilio mechowi Dewitz, 1881
- Papilio mechowianus Dewitz, 1885
- Papilio echerioides joiceyi Gabriel, 1945
- Papilio jacksoni imatonga Clifton & Collins, 1997
- Papilio nobilis didingensis Carpenter, 1928
- Papilio hesperus sudana Gabriel, 1945
- Papilio lormieri Distant, 1874
- Papilio mackinnoni Sharpe, 1891

==== Leptocercini ====
- Graphium antheus (Cramer, 1779)
- Graphium policenes policenes (Cramer, 1775)
- Graphium policenes telloi Hecq, 1999
- Graphium colonna (Ward, 1873)
- Graphium angolanus baronis (Ungemach, 1932)
- Graphium ridleyanus (White, 1843)
- Graphium leonidas (Fabricius, 1793)
- Graphium philonoe whalleyi (Talbot, 1929)
- Graphium almansor escherichi (Gaede, 1915)

== Pieridae ==
=== Coliadinae ===
- Eurema brigitta (Stoll, [1780])
- Eurema hecabe solifera (Butler, 1875)
- Catopsilia florella (Fabricius, 1775)
- Colias electo pseudohecate Berger, 1940
- Colias marnoana Rogenhofer, 1884

=== Pierinae ===
- Colotis antevippe zera (Lucas, 1852)
- Colotis aurigineus (Butler, 1883)
- Colotis aurora evarne (Klug, 1829)
- Colotis celimene angusi Rothschild, 1921
- Colotis celimene sudanicus (Aurivillius, 1905)
- Colotis chrysonome (Klug, 1829)
- Colotis daira stygia (Felder & Felder, 1865)
- Colotis danae eupompe (Klug, 1829)
- Colotis elgonensis basilewskyi Berger, 1956
- Colotis ephyia (Klug, 1829)
- Colotis euippe exole (Reiche, 1850)
- Colotis halimede (Klug, 1829)
- Colotis hetaera aspasia (Ungemach, 1932)
- Colotis liagore (Klug, 1829)
- Colotis phisadia (Godart, 1819)
- Colotis pleione nilus Talbot, 1942
- Colotis protomedia (Klug, 1829)
- Colotis rogersi (Dixey, 1915)
- Colotis ungemachi (Le Cerf, 1922)
- Colotis vesta princeps Talbot, 1939
- Colotis vesta velleda (Lucas, 1852)
- Colotis vestalis castalis (Staudinger, 1884)
- Colotis eris (Klug, 1829)
- Calopieris eulimene (Klug, 1829)
- Eronia cleodora Hübner, 1823
- Eronia leda (Boisduval, 1847)
- Pinacopterix eriphia melanarge (Butler, 1886)
- Pinacopterix eriphia tritogenia (Klug, 1829)
- Nepheronia argia (Fabricius, 1775)
- Nepheronia buquetii (Boisduval, 1836)
- Nepheronia thalassina sinalata (Suffert, 1904)
- Euchloe falloui (Allard, 1867)
- Leptosia alcesta inalcesta Bernardi, 1959

==== Pierini ====
- Appias epaphia contracta (Butler, 1888)
- Appias phaola intermedia Dufrane, 1948
- Appias sabina (Felder & Felder, [1865])
- Appias sylvia sudanensis Talbot, 1932
- Pontia glauconome Klug, 1829
- Mylothris agathina (Cramer, 1779)
- Mylothris chloris (Fabricius, 1775)
- Mylothris jacksoni nagichota Talbot, 1944
- Mylothris rubricosta (Mabille, 1890)
- Mylothris rueppellii septentrionalis Carpenter, 1928
- Mylothris schumanni uniformis Talbot, 1944
- Dixeia dixeyi (Neave, 1904)
- Dixeia doxo doxo (Godart, 1819)
- Dixeia doxo venatus (Butler, 1871)
- Dixeia orbona vidua (Butler, 1900)
- Belenois aurota (Fabricius, 1793)
- Belenois creona (Cramer, [1776])
- Belenois raffrayi (Oberthür, 1878)
- Belenois solilucis loveni (Aurivillius, 1921)
- Belenois subeida (Felder & Felder, 1865)
- Belenois sudanensis (Talbot, 1929)
- Belenois theora laeta (Weymer, 1903)
- Belenois thysa meldolae Butler, 1872

== Lycaenidae ==
=== Miletinae ===
==== Miletini ====
- Megalopalpus zymna (Westwood, 1851)
- Lachnocnema abyssinica Libert, 1996
- Lachnocnema emperamus (Snellen, 1872)
- Lachnocnema divergens Gaede, 1915
- Lachnocnema reutlingeri perspicua Libert, 1996

=== Poritiinae ===
==== Liptenini ====
- Alaena subrubra Bethune-Baker, 1915
- Pentila pauli multiplagata Bethune-Baker, 1908
- Pentila umangiana connectens Hulstaert, 1924
- Telipna sulpitia Hulstaert, 1924
- Telipna albofasciata laplumei Devos, 1917
- Ornipholidotos overlaeti intermedia Libert, 2005
- Ornipholidotos latimargo (Hawker-Smith, 1933)
- Mimacraea krausei karschioides Carpenter & Jackson, 1950
- Liptena ferrymani (Grose-Smith & Kirby, 1891)
- Liptena xanthostola xantha (Grose-Smith, 1901)
- Tetrarhanis ilala (Riley, 1929)
- Larinopoda lircaea (Hewitson, 1866)

==== Epitolini ====
- Stempfferia cercenoides (Holland, 1890)
- Cephetola dolorosa (Roche, 1954)
- Phytala elais ugandae Jackson, 1964

=== Aphnaeinae ===
- Pseudaletis agrippina Druce, 1888
- Chloroselas tamaniba (Walker, 1870)
- Chloroselas taposana Riley, 1932
- Cigaritis acamas bellatrix (Butler, 1886)
- Cigaritis nilus (Hewitson, 1865)
- Zeritis neriene Boisduval, 1836
- Zeritis pulcherrima Aurivillius, 1923
- Axiocerses harpax kadugli Talbot, 1935
- Axiocerses amanga (Westwood, 1881)
- Aphnaeus coronae Talbot, 1935

=== Theclinae ===
- Myrina silenus (Fabricius, 1775)
- Myrina subornata nuba Talbot, 1935
- Dapidodigma demeter sudsudana d'Abrera, 1980
- Hypolycaena liara Druce, 1890
- Hypolycaena obscura Stempffer, 1947
- Leptomyrina sudanica Stempffer, 1964
- Iolaus alienus ugandae Stempffer, 1953
- Iolaus scintillans Aurivillius, 1905
- Iolaus sudanicus Aurivillius, 1905
- Iolaus pallene (Wallengren, 1857)
- Iolaus menas Druce, 1890
- Iolaus ismenias (Klug, 1834)
- Stugeta marmoreus (Butler, 1866)
- Paradeudorix ituri ugandae (Talbot, 1935)
- Hypomyrina mimetica Libert, 2004
- Deudorix dinochares Grose-Smith, 1887
- Deudorix dinomenes diomedes Jackson, 1966
- Deudorix livia (Klug, 1834)
- Deudorix lorisona baronica Ungemach, 1932
- Capys bamptoni Henning & Henning, 1988

=== Polyommatinae ===
==== Lycaenesthini ====
- Anthene butleri (Oberthür, 1880)
- Anthene crawshayi minuta (Bethune-Baker, 1916)
- Anthene hodsoni (Talbot, 1935)
- Anthene lunulata (Trimen, 1894)
- Anthene wilsoni (Talbot, 1935)
- Anthene lusones (Hewitson, 1874)
- Anthene nigeriae (Aurivillius, 1905)

==== Polyommatini ====
- Cupidopsis jobates mauritanica Riley, 1932
- Uranothauma delatorum Heron, 1909
- Uranothauma heritsia intermedia (Tite, 1958)
- Leptotes marginalis (Stempffer, 1944)
- Tuxentius margaritaceus (Sharpe, 1892)
- Tarucus balkanicus (Freyer, 1843)
- Tarucus legrasi Stempffer, 1948
- Tarucus rosacea (Austaut, 1885)
- Tarucus theophrastus (Fabricius, 1793)
- Tarucus ungemachi Stempffer, 1942
- Zizeeria karsandra (Moore, 1865)
- Actizera stellata (Trimen, 1883)
- Euchrysops alberta (Butler, 1901)
- Euchrysops albistriata (Capronnier, 1889)
- Euchrysops crawshayi (Butler, 1899)
- Euchrysops cyclopteris (Butler, 1876)
- Euchrysops nilotica (Aurivillius, 1904)
- Chilades eleusis (Demaison, 1888)
- Lepidochrysops albilinea Tite, 1959
- Lepidochrysops negus wau (Wichgraf, 1921)
- Lepidochrysops nigrita Tite, 1959
- Lepidochrysops polydialecta (Bethune-Baker, [1923])
- Lepidochrysops victoriae occidentalis Libert & Collins, 2001

== Nymphalidae ==
=== Danainae ===
==== Danaini ====
- Danaus chrysippus chrysippus (Linnaeus, 1758)
- Danaus chrysippus alcippus (Cramer, 1777)
- Danaus dorippus (Klug, 1845)
- Tirumala formosa neumanni (Rothschild, 1902)
- Tirumala petiverana (Doubleday, 1847)
- Amauris niavius aethiops Rothschild & Jordan, 1903
- Amauris tartarea Mabille, 1876
- Amauris albimaculata sudanica Talbot, 1940
- Amauris echeria mongallensis Carpenter, 1928
- Amauris echeria steckeri Kheil, 1890
- Amauris hecate (Butler, 1866)

=== Satyrinae ===
==== Melanitini ====
- Gnophodes betsimena parmeno Doubleday, 1849
- Melanitis libya Distant, 1882

==== Satyrini ====
- Bicyclus angulosa (Butler, 1868)
- Bicyclus campus (Karsch, 1893)
- Bicyclus istaris (Plötz, 1880)
- Bicyclus kenia (Rogenhofer, 1891)
- Bicyclus milyas (Hewitson, 1864)
- Bicyclus pavonis (Butler, 1876)
- Bicyclus martius sanaos (Hewitson, 1866)
- Bicyclus saussurei angustus Condamin, 1970
- Heteropsis perspicua (Trimen, 1873)
- Ypthima albida Butler, 1888
- Ypthima antennata van Son, 1955
- Ypthima condamini Kielland, 1982
- Ypthima doleta Kirby, 1880
- Ypthima pupillaris Butler, 1888
- Ypthima simplicia Butler, 1876
- Ypthimomorpha itonia (Hewitson, 1865)

=== Charaxinae ===
==== Charaxini ====
- Charaxes varanes vologeses (Mabille, 1876)
- Charaxes fulvescens monitor Rothschild, 1900
- Charaxes boueti rectans Rothschild & Jordan, 1903
- Charaxes cynthia kinduana Le Cerf, 1923
- Charaxes lactetinctus ungemachi Le Cerf, 1927
- Charaxes jasius Poulton, 1926
- Charaxes epijasius Reiche, 1850
- Charaxes hansali baringana Rothschild, 1905
- Charaxes brutus angustus Rothschild, 1900
- Charaxes julius somalicus Rothschild, 1900
- Charaxes ansorgei kinyeti Plantrou, 1989
- Charaxes pollux (Cramer, 1775)
- Charaxes druceanus vivianae Plantrou, 1982
- Charaxes eudoxus imatongensis Plantrou, 1982
- Charaxes eudoxus mechowi Rothschild, 1900
- Charaxes numenes aequatorialis van Someren, 1972
- Charaxes tiridates tiridatinus Röber, 1936
- Charaxes bipunctatus ugandensis van Someren, 1972
- Charaxes smaragdalis gobyae Plantrou, 1989
- Charaxes etesipe (Godart, 1824)
- Charaxes achaemenes monticola van Someren, 1970
- Charaxes jahlusa ganalensis Carpenter, 1937
- Charaxes eupale latimargo Joicey & Talbot, 1921
- Charaxes dilutus ngonga van Someren, 1974
- Charaxes baumanni didingensis van Someren, 1971
- Charaxes etheocles carpenteri van Someren & Jackson, 1957
- Charaxes cedreatis Hewitson, 1874
- Charaxes viola picta van Someren & Jackson, 1952
- Charaxes paphianus subpallida Joicey & Talbot, 1925
- Charaxes kahldeni Homeyer & Dewitz, 1882
- Charaxes zoolina (Westwood, [1850])
- Charaxes lycurgus bernardiana Plantrou, 1978
- Charaxes zelica depuncta Joicey & Talbot, 1921
- Charaxes amandae Rydon, 1989

==== Euxanthini ====
- Charaxes crossleyi ansorgei (Rothschild, 1903)

=== Apaturinae ===
- Apaturopsis cleochares (Hewitson, 1873)

=== Nymphalinae ===
==== Nymphalini ====
- Vanessa dimorphica (Howarth, 1966)
- Junonia chorimene (Guérin-Méneville, 1844)
- Junonia terea tereoides (Butler, 1901)
- Junonia westermanni Westwood, 1870
- Protogoniomorpha parhassus (Drury, 1782)
- Protogoniomorpha temora (Felder & Felder, 1867)
- Precis archesia ugandensis (McLeod, 1980)
- Precis coelestina Dewitz, 1879
- Precis octavia (Cramer, 1777)
- Precis tugela aurorina (Butler, 1894)
- Hypolimnas anthedon (Doubleday, 1845)
- Hypolimnas misippus (Linnaeus, 1764)
- Hypolimnas salmacis platydema Rothschild & Jordan, 1903
- Mallika jacksoni (Sharpe, 1896)

=== Biblidinae ===
==== Biblidini ====
- Byblia anvatara acheloia (Wallengren, 1857)
- Mesoxantha ethosea reducta Rothschild, 1918
- Neptidopsis ophione nucleata Grünberg, 1911

=== Limenitinae ===
==== Limenitidini ====
- Pseudoneptis bugandensis Stoneham, 1935
- Pseudacraea acholica Riley, 1932
- Pseudacraea boisduvalii (Doubleday, 1845)
- Pseudacraea eurytus (Linnaeus, 1758)
- Pseudacraea lucretia protracta (Butler, 1874)

==== Neptidini ====
- Neptis metella (Doubleday, 1848)
- Neptis nemetes nemetes Hewitson, 1868
- Neptis nemetes margueriteae Fox, 1968
- Neptis occidentalis Rothschild, 1918

==== Adoliadini ====
- Catuna crithea (Drury, 1773)
- Pseudargynnis hegemone (Godart, 1819)
- Euphaedra medon fraudata van Someren, 1935
- Euphaedra neumanni Rothschild, 1902
- Euphaedra harpalyce sudanensis Talbot, 1929

=== Heliconiinae ===
==== Acraeini ====
- Acraea chilo Godman, 1880
- Acraea insignis Distant, 1880
- Acraea neobule Doubleday, 1847
- Acraea pseudolycia astrigera Butler, 1899
- Acraea quirina (Fabricius, 1781)
- Acraea zetes (Linnaeus, 1758)
- Acraea abdera Hewitson, 1852
- Acraea cepheus (Linnaeus, 1758)
- Acraea egina (Cramer, 1775)
- Acraea guluensis Le Doux, 1932
- Acraea caecilia (Fabricius, 1781)
- Acraea caldarena Hewitson, 1877
- Acraea doubledayi Guérin-Méneville, 1849
- Acraea marnois Rogenhofer, 1890
- Acraea pseudegina Westwood, 1852
- Acraea sykesi Sharpe, 1902
- Acraea aganice orientalis (Ungemach, 1932)
- Acraea epaea paragea (Grose-Smith, 1900)
- Acraea epiprotea (Butler, 1874)
- Acraea macarista (Sharpe, 1906)
- Acraea poggei nelsoni Grose-Smith & Kirby, 1892
- Acraea pseuderyta Godman & Salvin, 1890
- Acraea acerata Hewitson, 1874
- Acraea bonasia (Fabricius, 1775)
- Acraea encedana Pierre, 1976
- Acraea serena (Fabricius, 1775)
- Acraea esebria Hewitson, 1861
- Acraea jodutta (Fabricius, 1793)
- Acraea johnstoni Godman, 1885
- Acraea lycoa Godart, 1819
- Acraea pharsalus pharsalus Ward, 1871
- Acraea pharsalus rhodina Rothschild, 1902
- Acraea oreas Sharpe, 1891

==== Argynnini ====
- Issoria hanningtoni imatonga (Riley, 1932)

==== Vagrantini ====
- Lachnoptera anticlia (Hübner, 1819)
- Phalanta eurytis eurytis (Doubleday, 1847)
- Phalanta eurytis microps (Rothschild & Jordan, 1903)
- Phalanta phalantha aethiopica (Rothschild & Jordan, 1903)

== Hesperiidae ==
=== Coeliadinae ===
- Coeliades forestan (Stoll, [1782])
- Coeliades keithloa menelik (Ungemach, 1932)
- Coeliades pisistratus (Fabricius, 1793)

=== Pyrginae ===
==== Celaenorrhinini ====
- Celaenorrhinus proxima (Mabille, 1877)
- Eretis lugens (Rogenhofer, 1891)
- Eretis melania Mabille, 1891
- Eretis mixta Evans, 1937
- Sarangesa aza Evans, 1951
- Sarangesa brigida sanaga Miller, 1964
- Sarangesa laelius (Mabille, 1877)
- Sarangesa lucidella (Mabille, 1891)
- Sarangesa phidyle (Walker, 1870)

==== Tagiadini ====
- Tagiades flesus (Fabricius, 1781)
- Eagris decastigma purpura Evans, 1937
- Eagris denuba obliterata Carpenter, 1928
- Eagris lucetia (Hewitson, 1875)
- Eagris tigris liberti Collins & Larsen, 2005
- Caprona adelica Karsch, 1892
- Netrobalane canopus (Trimen, 1864)
- Abantis bismarcki Karsch, 1892

==== Carcharodini ====
- Spialia doris (Walker, 1870)
- Spialia zebra bifida (Higgins, 1924)

=== Hesperiinae ===
==== Aeromachini ====
- Prosopalpus styla Evans, 1937
- Kedestes protensa Butler, 1901
- Kedestes rogersi Druce, 1907
- Gorgyra aretina (Hewitson, 1878)
- Pardaleodes incerta (Snellen, 1872)
- Pardaleodes sator pusiella Mabille, 1877
- Pardaleodes tibullus (Fabricius, 1793)
- Osmodes thora (Plötz, 1884)
- Acleros mackenii olaus (Plötz, 1884)
- Andronymus caesar philander (Hopffer, 1855)
- Chondrolepis niveicornis (Plötz, 1883)
- Zophopetes dysmephila (Trimen, 1868)
- Gretna cylinda (Hewitson, 1876)
- Caenides dacena (Hewitson, 1876)
- Fresna nyassae (Hewitson, 1878)

==== Baorini ====
- Borbo fallax (Gaede, 1916)
- Borbo perobscura (Druce, 1912)
- Gegenes nostrodamus (Fabricius, 1793)

=== Heteropterinae ===
- Metisella quadrisignatus (Butler, 1894)
- Metisella tsadicus (Aurivillius, 1905)
- Lepella lepeletier (Latreille, 1824)
