= List of butterflies of Seychelles =

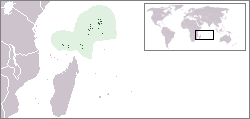
Location of Seychelles

This is a list of butterflies of Seychelles. About 25 species are known from Seychelles, three of which are endemic.

== Papilionidae ==
=== Papilioninae ===
==== Papilionini ====
- Papilio phorbanta nana Oberthür, 1879

== Pieridae ==
=== Coliadinae ===
- Eurema brigitta pulchella (Boisduval, 1833)
- Eurema floricola aldabrensis Bernardi, 1969
- Catopsilia florella (Fabricius, 1775)

=== Pierinae ===
- Colotis evanthides (Holland, 1896)

==== Pierini ====
- Belenois aldabrensis (Holland, 1896) (endemic)
- Belenois grandidieri (Mabille, 1878)

== Lycaenidae ==
=== Theclinae ===
==== Theclini ====
- Hypolycaena philippus ramonza (Saalmüller, 1878)

=== Polyommatinae ===
==== Polyommatini ====
- Leptotes pirithous (Linnaeus, 1767)
- Zizeeria knysna (Trimen, 1862)
- Zizula hylax (Fabricius, 1775)

== Nymphalidae ==
=== Danainae ===
==== Danaini ====
- Danaus chrysippus orientis (Aurivillius, 1909)
- Amauris niavius dominicanus Trimen, 1879
- Euploea mitra Moore, 1858 (endemic)

=== Satyrinae ===
==== Melanitini ====
- Melanitis leda (Linnaeus, 1758)

=== Nymphalinae ===
==== Nymphalini ====
- Junonia hierta cebrene Trimen, 1870
- Junonia oenone epiclelia (Boisduval, 1833)
- Junonia orithya madagascariensis Guenée, 1865
- Junonia rhadama (Boisduval, 1833)
- Hypolimnas misippus (Linnaeus, 1764)

=== Heliconiinae ===
==== Acraeini ====
- Acraea neobule legrandi Carcasson, 1964

==== Vagrantini ====
- Phalanta phalantha aethiopica (Rothschild & Jordan, 1903)
- Phalanta philiberti (de Joannis, 1893) (endemic)

== Hesperiidae ==
=== Pyrginae ===
==== Tagiadini ====
- Eagris sabadius aldabranus Fryer, 1912
- Eagris sabadius maheta Evans, 1937

=== Hesperiinae ===
==== Baorini ====
- Borbo borbonica morella (de Joannis, 1893)
- Borbo gemella (Mabille, 1884)

== See also ==
- List of moths of Seychelles
- Wildlife of Seychelles
