= Belenois ogygia =

Scientific classification
- Kingdom: Animalia
- Phylum: Arthropoda
- Class: Insecta
- Order: Lepidoptera
- Family: Pieridae
- Genus: Belenois
- Species: B. ogygia

Binomial name
- Belenois ogygia (Trimen, 1883)

Synonyms
- Pieris ogygia Trimen, 1883

Species of butterfly

Belenois ogygia is a butterfly in the family Pieridae. It is found in South Africa and the Democratic Republic of the Congo.

== Taxonomy ==
The species is probably a hybrid of Belenois thysa and Belenois zochalia.

== Subspecies ==
- Belenois ogygia ogygia (South Africa)
- Belenois ogygia bongeya Berger, 1981 (Democratic Republic of the Congo)
