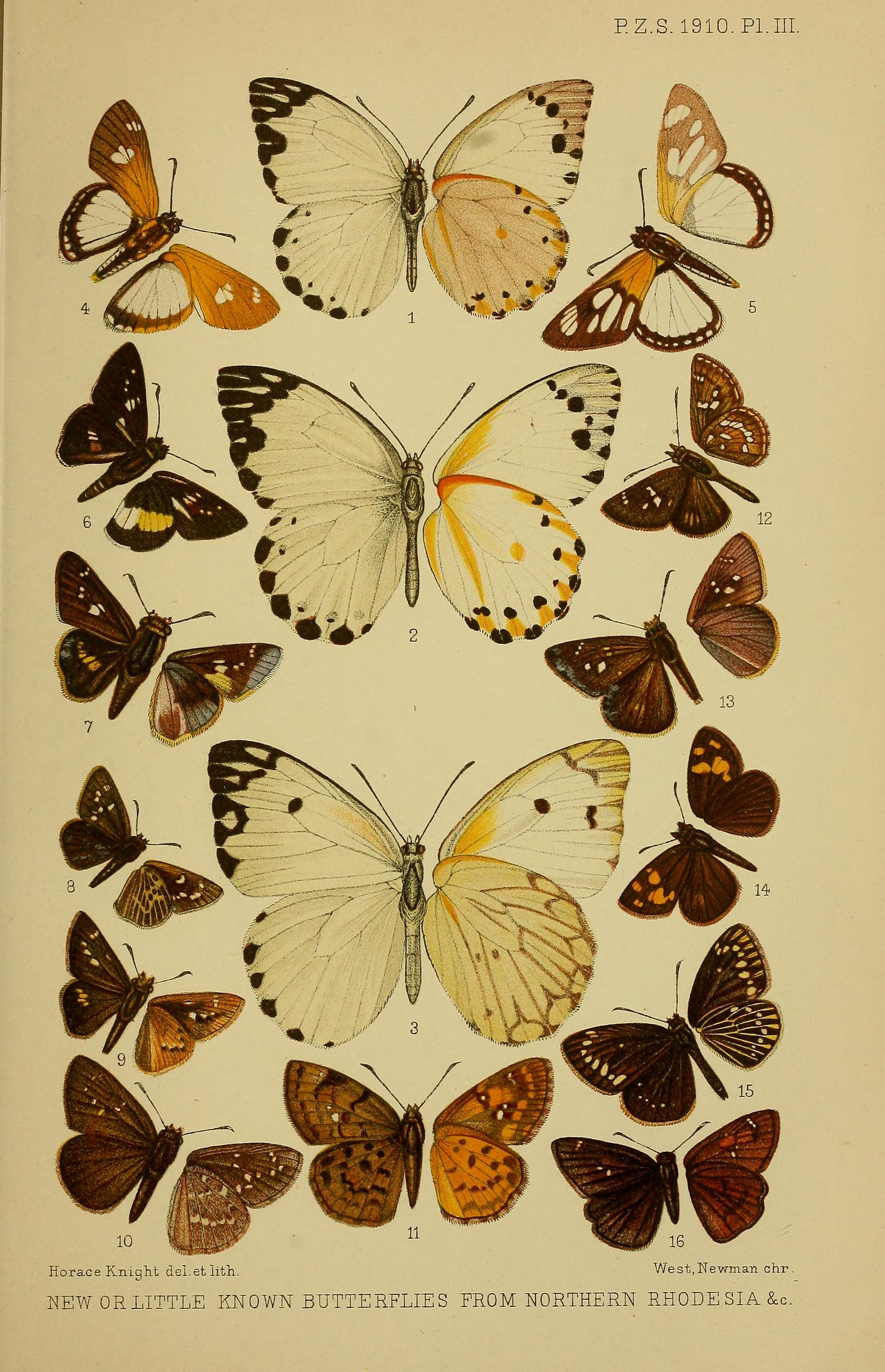
- Figure 1 (dry-season male), figure 2 (wet-season male)

Scientific classification
- Kingdom: Animalia
- Phylum: Arthropoda
- Class: Insecta
- Order: Lepidoptera
- Family: Pieridae
- Genus: Belenois
- Species: B. rubrosignata

Binomial name
- Belenois rubrosignata (Weymer, 1901)

Synonyms
- Pieris theora var. rubrosignata Weymer, 1901; Belenois picta Neave, 1910; Pieris rubrosignata f. overlaeti Hulstaert, 1924; Belenois rubrosignata rubrosignata f. albinescens Talbot, 1943; Belenois rubrosignata rubrosignata f. caesia Talbot, 1943; Belenois rubrosignata rubrosignata f. aurantia Talbot, 1943; Belenois peeli Dixey, 1900

= Belenois rubrosignata =

Red-edged white

Species of butterfly

Belenois rubrosignata, the red-edged white, is a butterfly in the family Pieridae. It is found in Angola, the Democratic Republic of the Congo, Zambia, Malawi, Tanzania, Uganda, Kenya and Somalia. The habitat consists of dense woodland.

The larvae feed on Ritchiea species.

== Subspecies ==
- Belenois rubrosignata rubrosignata (Angola, Democratic Republic of the Congo, northern Zambia)
- Belenois rubrosignata kongwana Talbot, 1943 (Malawi, Tanzania, southern Uganda)
- Belenois rubrosignata peeli Dixey, 1900 (Somalia, Kenya)
