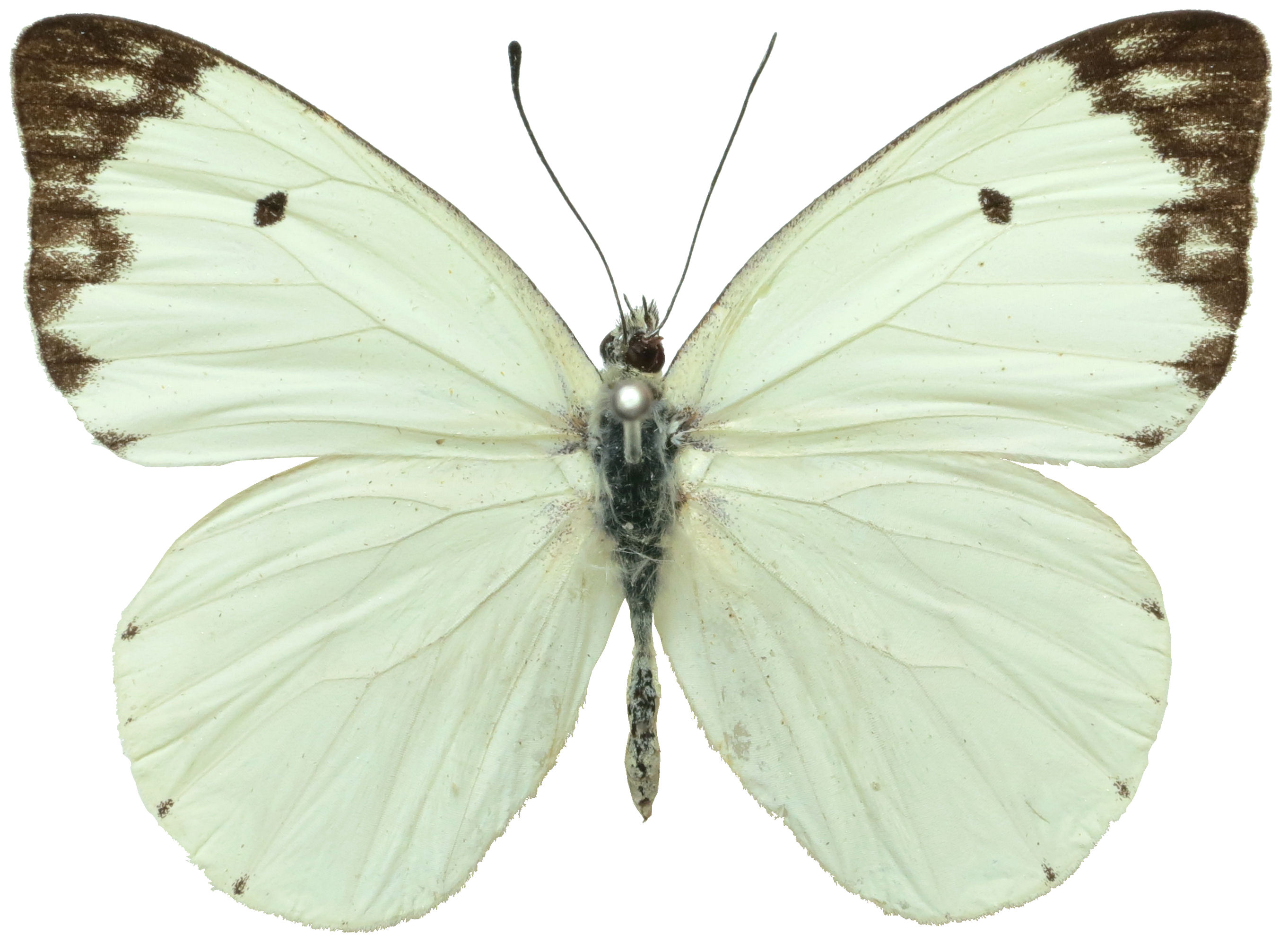
- Belenois victoria victoria male - Kakamega County, Kenya

Scientific classification
- Kingdom: Animalia
- Phylum: Arthropoda
- Class: Insecta
- Order: Lepidoptera
- Family: Pieridae
- Genus: Belenois
- Species: B. victoria

Binomial name
- Belenois victoria Dixey, 1915

Synonyms
- Pieris crawshayi f. boguensoides Joicey and Talbot, 1927; Pieris crawshayi boguensoides f. andromorpha Joicey and Talbot, 1927; Pieris crawshayi boguensoides f. bicolor Joicey and Talbot, 1927; Pieris crawshayi boguensoides f. nigrimacula Joicey and Talbot, 1927; Pieris crawshayi boguensoides f. unicolor Joicey and Talbot, 1927; Pieris crawshayi boguensoides f. chromiphora Joicey and Talbot, 1927; Pieris elgonensis Neustetter, 1929; Belenois victoria f. dixeyi Stoneham, 1932; Pieris crawshayi boguensoides f. kivuensis Joicey and Talbot, 1927; Pieris crawshayi boguensoides f. holochroma Joicey and Talbot, 1927

= Belenois victoria =

Victoria white

Species of butterfly

Belenois victoria, the Victoria white, is a butterfly in the family Pieridae. It is found in Kenya, Uganda, Rwanda, Burundi, Tanzania and the Democratic Republic of the Congo. The habitat consists of forests, including riparian forests.

The larvae feed on Capparis tomentosa, Ritchiea and Maerua species.

== Subspecies ==
- Belenois victoria victoria (Kenya (highlands west of the Rift Valley), Uganda)
- Belenois victoria hecqi Berger, 1953 (Democratic Republic of the Congo)
- Belenois victoria schoutedeni Berger, 1953 (western Uganda, Rwanda, Democratic Republic of the Congo, western Tanzania)
