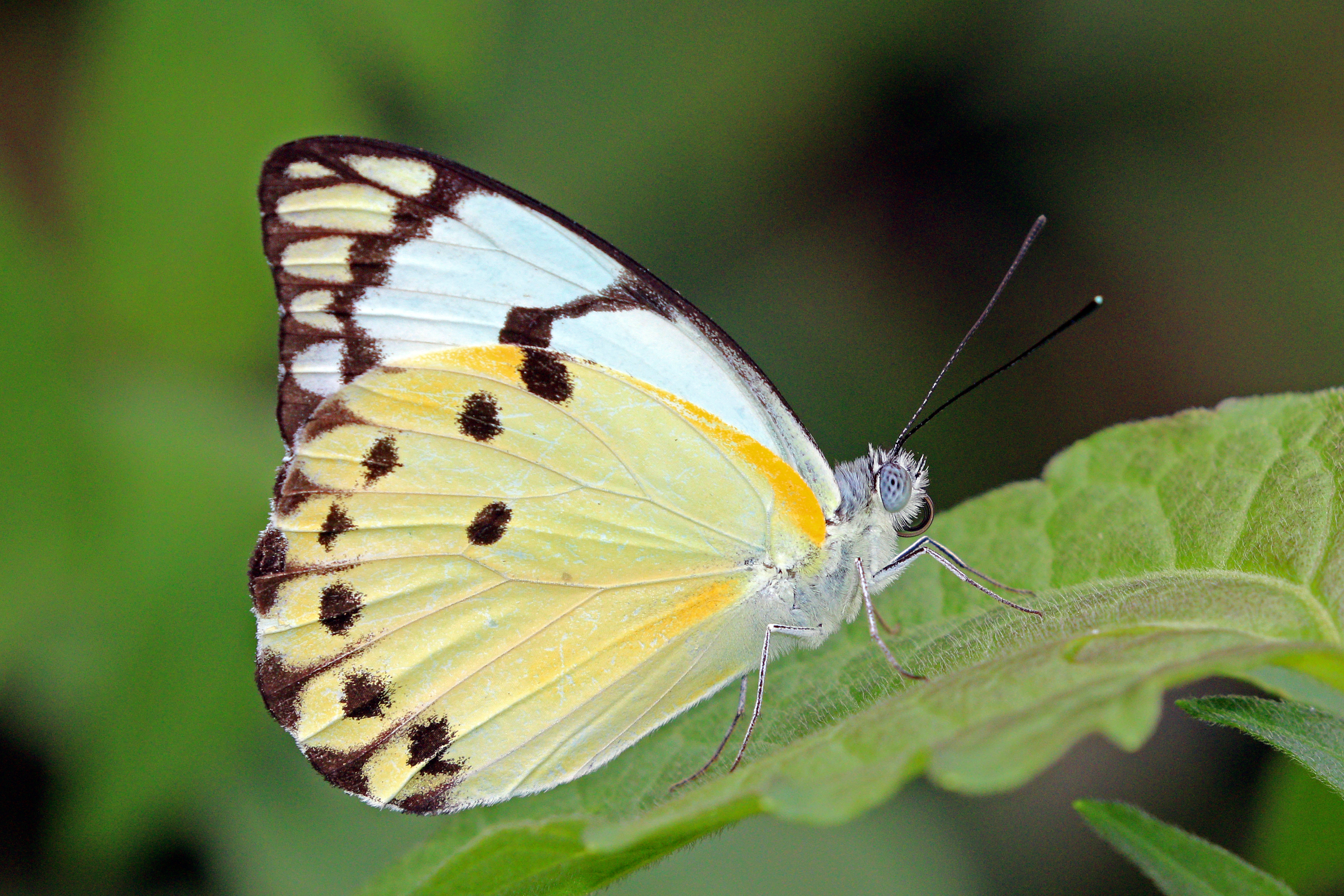
- male B. c. calypso, Ghana
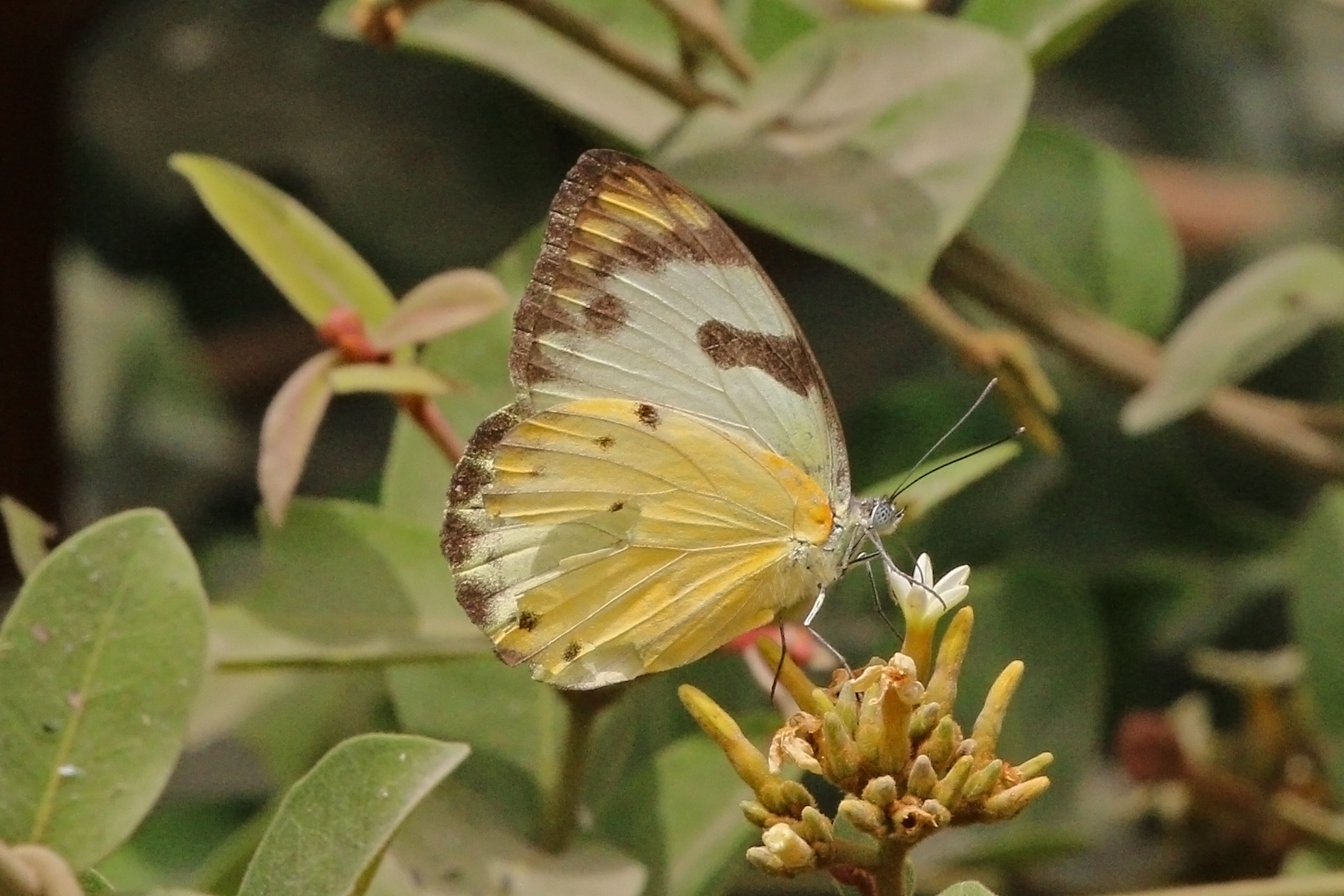
- female B. c. calypso, Gambia

Scientific classification
- Kingdom: Animalia
- Phylum: Arthropoda
- Clade: Pancrustacea
- Class: Insecta
- Order: Lepidoptera
- Family: Pieridae
- Genus: Belenois
- Species: B. calypso

Binomial name
- Belenois calypso (Drury, 1773)

Synonyms
- Papilio calypso Drury, 1773; Papilio fulvoacuminatus Goeze, 1779; Papilio nigronotatus Goeze, 1779; Papilio nigropictus Goeze, 1779; Belenois calypso f. lypsoca Berger, 1939; Belenois calypso calypso f. cretacea Talbot, 1943; Belenois dentigera Butler, 1888; Pieris subeida var. schweinfurthi Schultze, 1914; Pieris calypso var. costimacula Gaede, 1916; Pieris calypso calypso ab. flavida Hulstaert, 1924; Pieris calypso calypso ab. pulchricolor Hulstaert, 1924; Anapheis calypso dentigera f. tshangerensis Dufrane, 1948; Belenois calypso dentigera f. aurea Berger, 1981; Belenois calypso minor f. butyrosa Talbot, 1943; Belenois calypso f. nausicaa Stoneham, 1957; Belenois calypso f. helena Stoneham, 1957; Belenois calypso f. alcestis Stoneham, 1957; Belenois calypso f. alcimede Stoneham, 1957; Belenois calypso f. alcippe Stoneham, 1957

= Belenois calypso =

Species of butterfly

Belenois calypso, the Calypso white or Calypso caper white, is a butterfly in the family Pieridae. It is found in Senegal, the Gambia, Guinea-Bissau, Guinea, Sierra Leone, Liberia, Ivory Coast, Burkina Faso, Ghana, Togo, Benin, Nigeria, Cameroon, the Republic of the Congo, the Central African Republic, the Democratic Republic of the Congo, Angola, Uganda, Kenya and Tanzania. The habitat consists of forests. The species occasionally migrates.

The larvae feed on Semirestis paniculata, Maerua, Cadaba, Capparis and Ritchiea species.

== Subspecies ==
- B. c. calypso (Senegal, the Gambia, Guinea-Bissau. Guinea, Sierra Leone, Liberia, Ivory Coast, Burkina Faso, Ghana, Togo, Benin, Nigeria)
- B. c. dentigera Butler, 1888 (Cameroon, Congo, Central African Republic, Democratic Republic of the Congo, north-western Angola)
- B. c. marlieri Berger, 1981 (Democratic Republic of the Congo)
- B. c. minor Talbot, 1943 (Uganda, Kenya (west of the Rift Valley), north-western Tanzania)

Torben Larsen developed a species numbering system for his 2005 publication Butterflies of West Africa. The nominate subspecies is #73. The 'Larsen' numbers have since been used with permission in A Sharp Eye on Butterflies of Ghana.
