= Belenois larima =

Scientific classification
- Kingdom: Animalia
- Phylum: Arthropoda
- Class: Insecta
- Order: Lepidoptera
- Family: Pieridae
- Genus: Belenois
- Species: B. larima

Binomial name
- Belenois larima (Boisduval, 1836)

Synonyms
- Pieris larima Boisduval, 1836; Dixeia larima

Species of butterfly

Belenois larima is a butterfly in the family Pieridae. It is found in Senegal.

== Taxonomy ==
This species is of doubtful status. Aurivillius treated it as a west African race of Belenois thysa in 1898, but treated it as distinct in 1910. Larsen regarded it to possibly be a natural hybrid and suggested that it should be treated as a nomen dubium in 2005.
