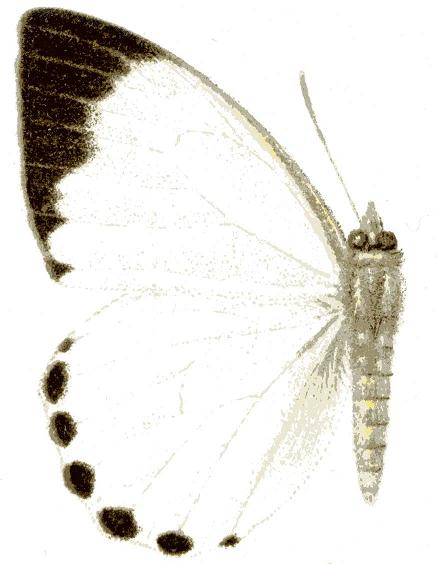

Scientific classification
- Kingdom: Animalia
- Phylum: Arthropoda
- Clade: Pancrustacea
- Class: Insecta
- Order: Lepidoptera
- Family: Pieridae
- Genus: Belenois
- Species: B. theuszi

Binomial name
- Belenois theuszi (Dewitz, 1889)

Synonyms
- Pieris theuszi Dewitz, 1889; Pieris theuszi var. semialba Aurivillius, 1895; Pieris theuszi ab. semimaculata Strand, 1913; Pieris theuszi var. hypermaculata Strand, 1913; Pieris theuszi ab. perimagia Strand, 1913; Pieris theuszi ab. reducta Birket-Smith, 1960

= Belenois theuszi =

Central caper white

Species of butterfly

Belenois theuszi, the central caper white, is a butterfly in the family Pieridae. It is found in eastern Nigeria, Cameroon, Equatorial Guinea, Gabon, the Republic of the Congo, the Central African Republic, northern Angola, the Democratic Republic of the Congo and western Uganda. The habitat consists of primary, dense forest.

The larvae feed on Ritchiea species.
