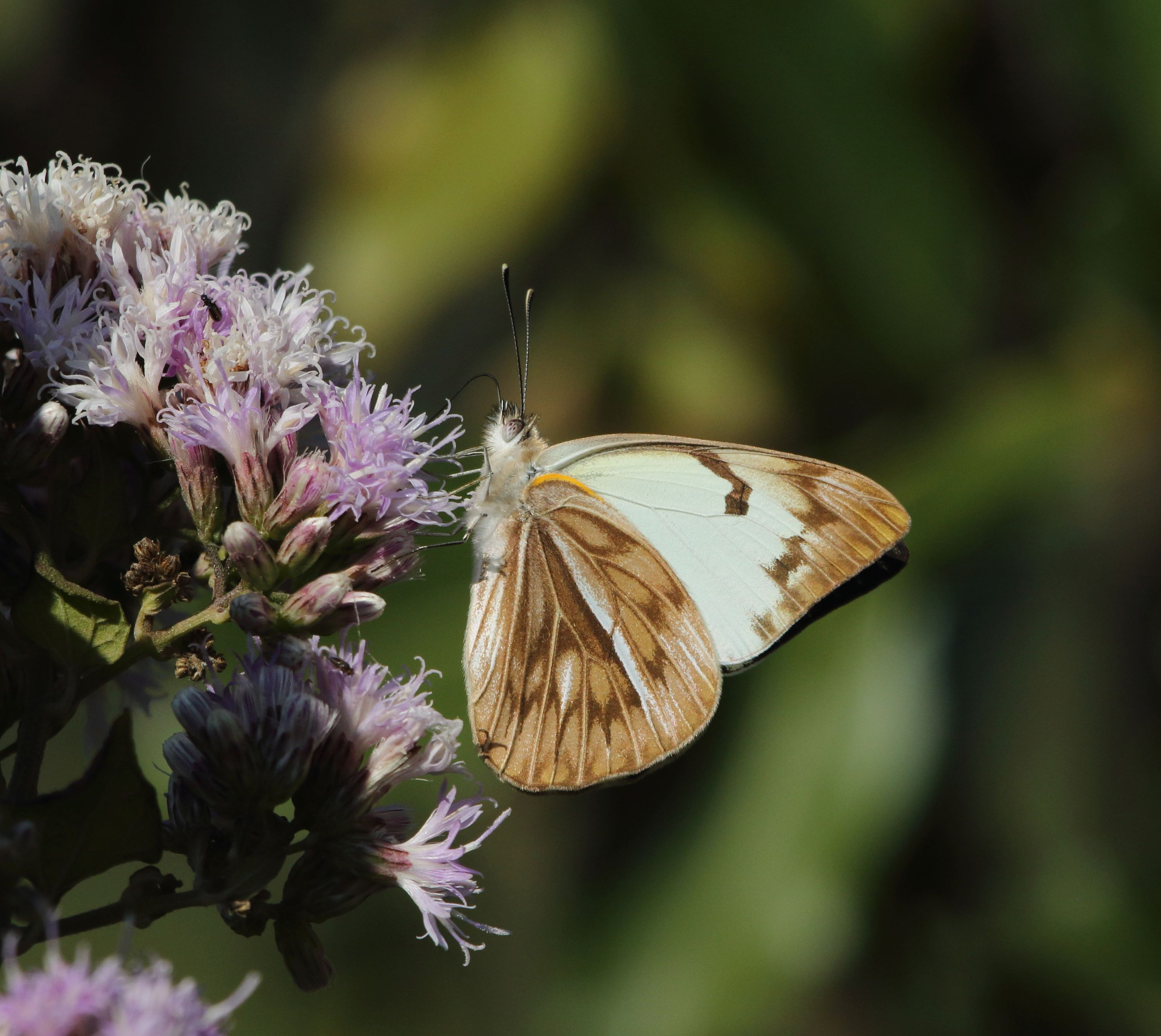
- Male B. g. abyssinica on Distephanus angulifolius flowers

Scientific classification
- Kingdom: Animalia
- Phylum: Arthropoda
- Class: Insecta
- Order: Lepidoptera
- Family: Pieridae
- Genus: Belenois
- Species: B. gidica

Binomial name
- Belenois gidica (Godart, [1819])

Synonyms
- Pieris gidica Godart, 1819; Belenois occidentis Butler, 1898; Pieris gidica f. tschadica Aurivillius, 1910; Pieris gidica var. sulphurea Gaede, 1916; Pieris gidica f. masculina Hulstaert, 1924; Anapheis gidica gidica f. albata Talbot, 1929; Anapheis gidica gidica f. arida Talbot, 1929; Pieris abyssinica Lucas, 1852; Pinacopteryx doubledayi Wallengren, 1857; Pinacopteryx westwoodi Wallengren, 1857; Pieris allica Oberthür, 1878; Pieris gidica var. westwoodi ab. simplex Rebel, 1914; Pieris gidica var. pallida Gaede, 1916; Pieris gidica abyssinica f. texturata Ungemach, 1932; Pieris gidica abyssinica f. crassilinea Ungemach, 1932; Anapheis gidica westwoodi f. nigrescens Talbot, 1943; Anapheis gidica westwoodi f. nigrifusa Talbot, 1943; Anapheis gidica westwoodi f. masformis Talbot, 1943; Anapheis gidica westwoodi f. subochracea Talbot, 1943; Anapheis gidica occidentalis ab. deficiens Dufrane, 1947; Glycestha gidica westwoodi f. androides Storace, 1948; Anapheis gidica centralis Stoneham, 1957; Pieris gidica hypoxantha Ungemach, 1932

= Belenois gidica =

Species of butterfly

Belenois gidica, the African veined white or pointed caper, is a butterfly in the family Pieridae. It is found in the Afrotropical realm.

The wingspan is 40–55 millimetres (1.6–2.2 in) in males and 40–53 mm (1.6–2.1 in) in females. Its flight period is year-round.

The larvae feed on Boscia, Capparis, and Maerua species.

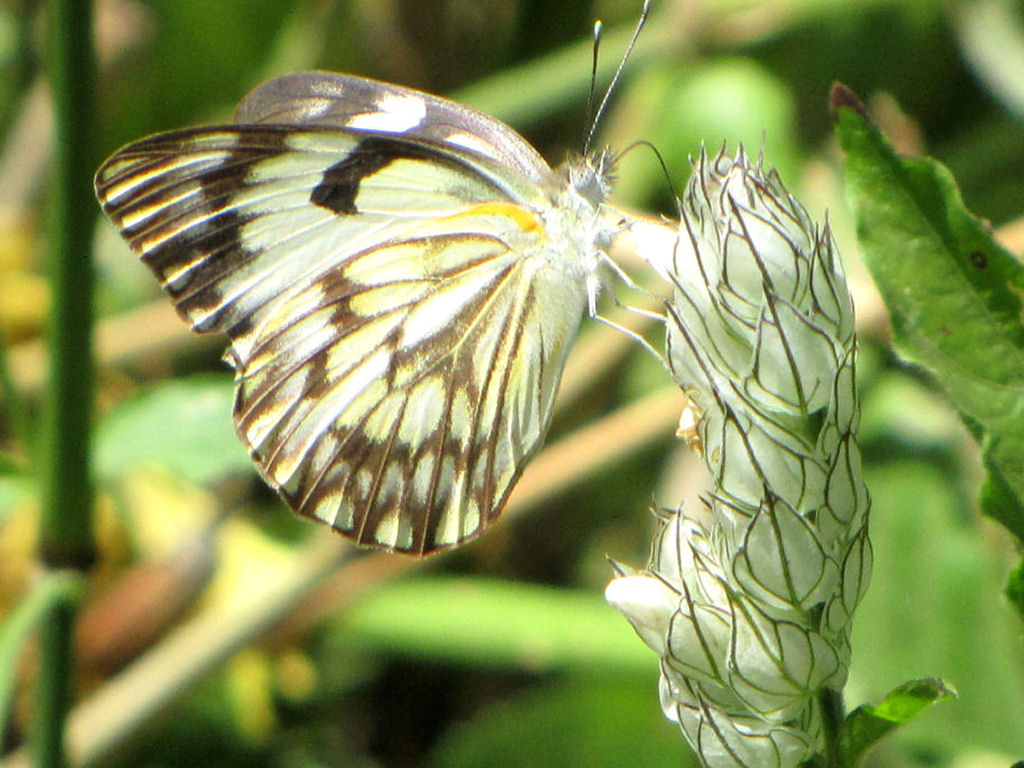
In Lake Manyara National Park, Tanzania

== Subspecies ==
The following subspecies are recognised:

- B. g. gidica (Mauritania, Senegal, Gambia, Burkina Faso, Ghana, Ivory Coast, northern Nigeria, Niger)
- B. g. hypoxantha (Ungemach, 1932) (Ethiopia)
- B. g. abyssinica (Lucas, 1852) (Ethiopia, Kenya, Uganda, south-eastern Democratic Republic of the Congo to Zambia, Mozambique, Zimbabwe, Botswana, northern Namibia, South Africa, Eswatini)
