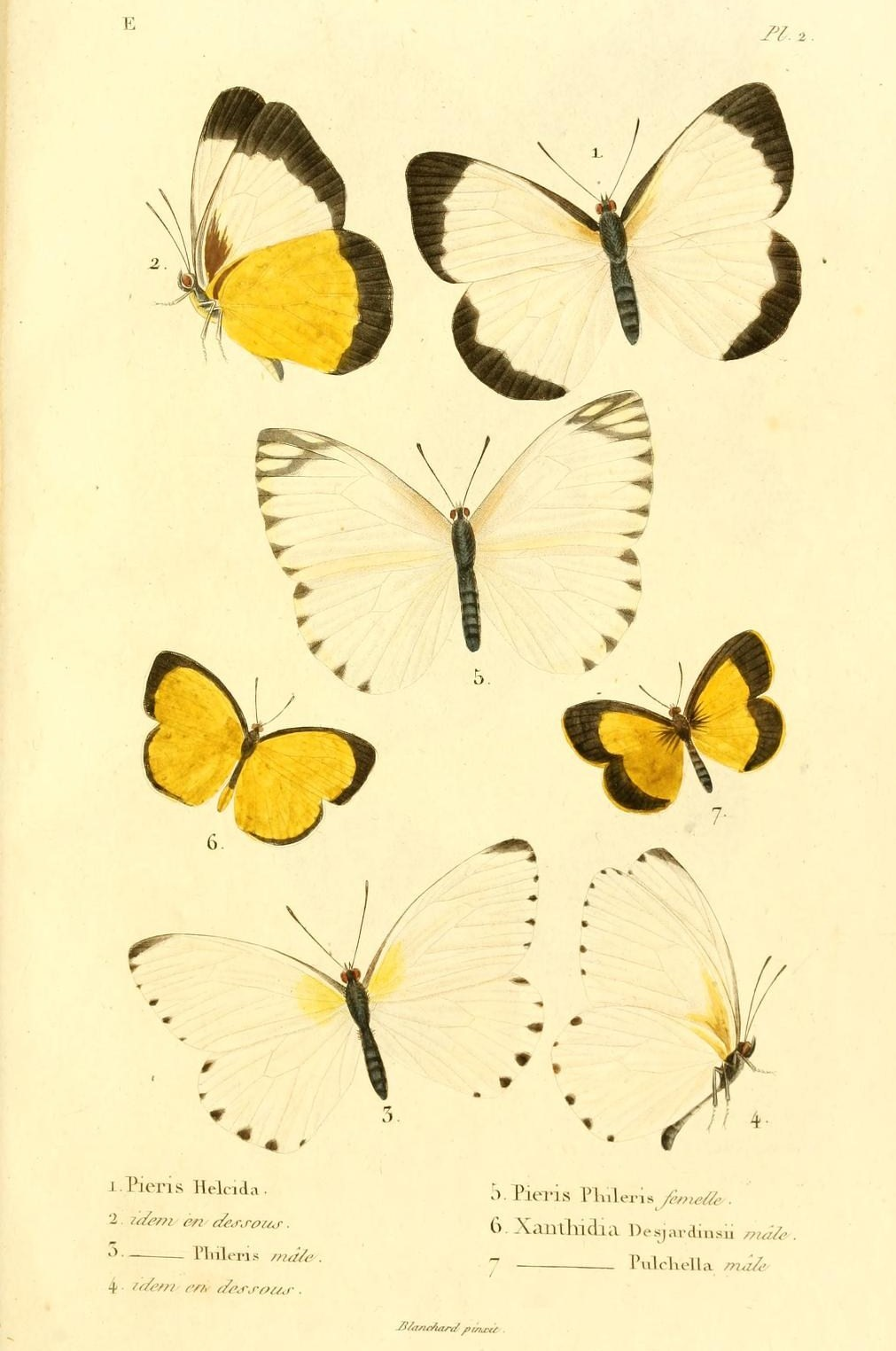
- Belenois helcida figures 1, 2

Scientific classification
- Kingdom: Animalia
- Phylum: Arthropoda
- Class: Insecta
- Order: Lepidoptera
- Family: Pieridae
- Genus: Belenois
- Species: B. helcida

Binomial name
- Belenois helcida (Boisduval, 1833)

Synonyms
- Pieris helcida Boisduval, 1833; Belenois albipennis Butler, 1879

= Belenois helcida =

Species of butterfly

Belenois helcida is a butterfly in the family Pieridae. It is found on Madagascar. The habitat consists of forests.
