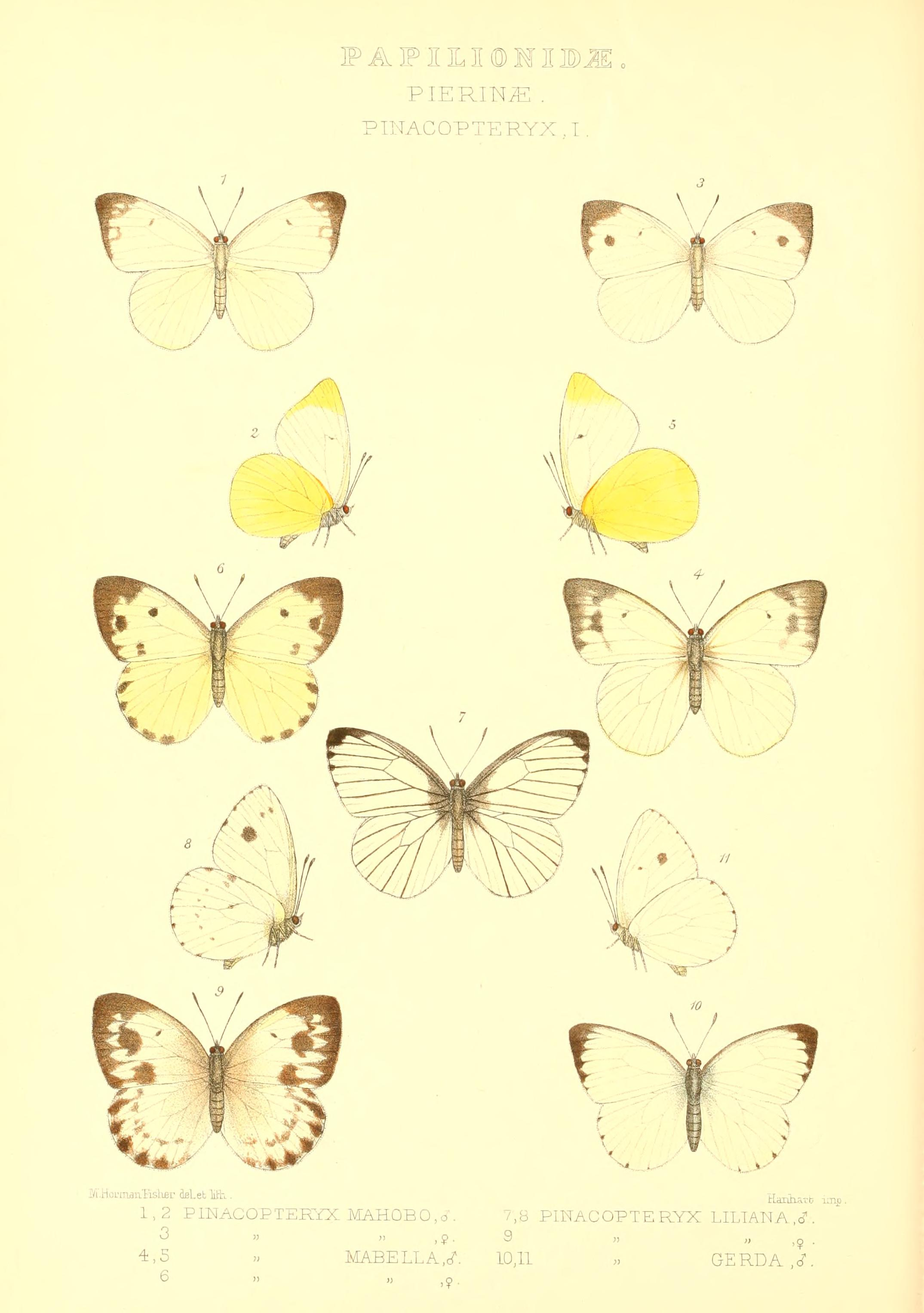
- Belenois mabella figures 1-6

Scientific classification
- Kingdom: Animalia
- Phylum: Arthropoda
- Class: Insecta
- Order: Lepidoptera
- Family: Pieridae
- Genus: Belenois
- Species: B. mabella

Binomial name
- Belenois mabella Grose-Smith, 1891

Synonyms
- Belenois mahobo Grose-Smith, 1891

= Belenois mabella =

Species of butterfly

Belenois mabella is a butterfly in the family Pieridae. It is found on Madagascar. The habitat consists of forest margins.
