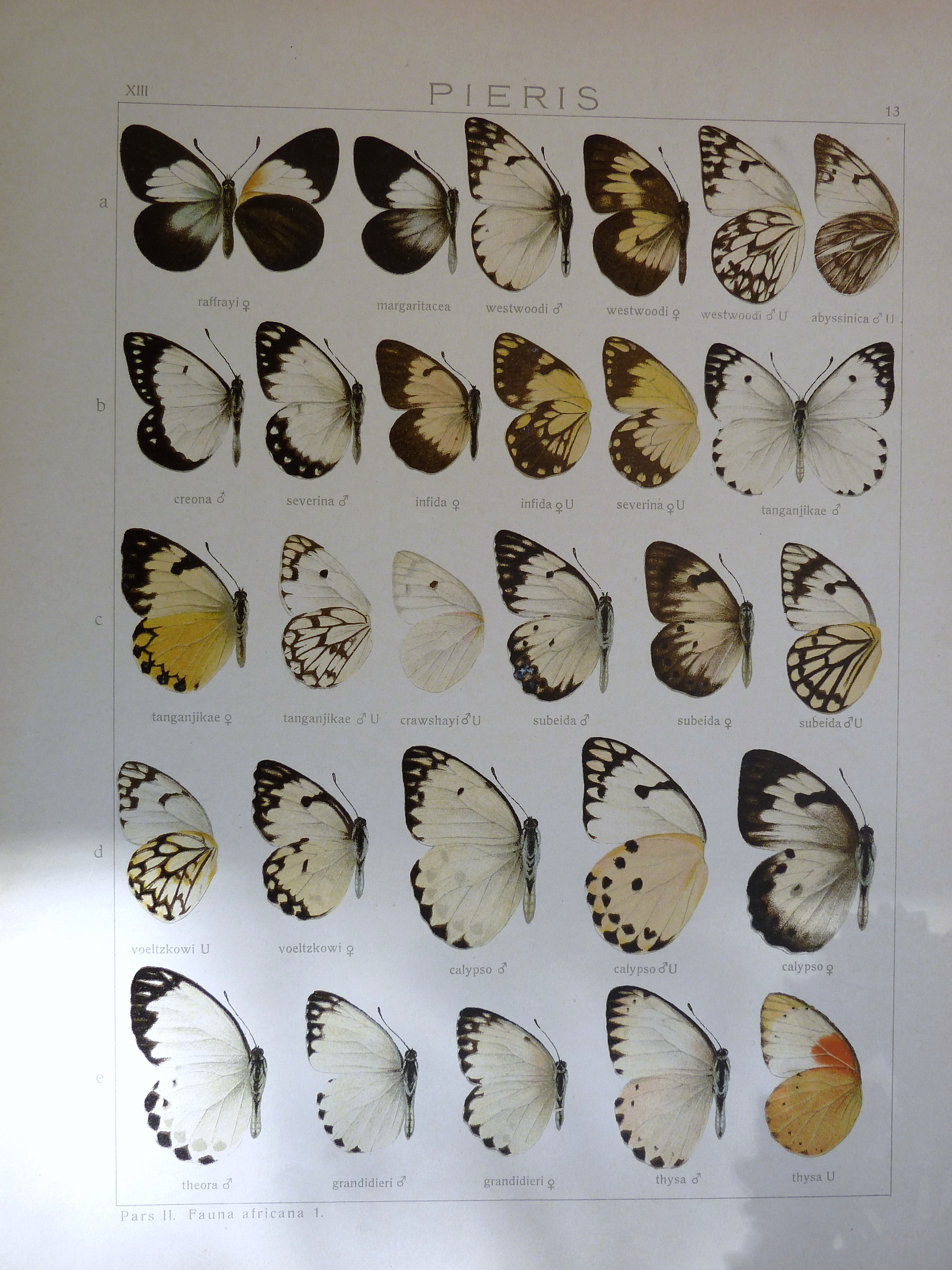
- Belenois diminuta as var. tanganjikae in Seitz

Scientific classification
- Kingdom: Animalia
- Phylum: Arthropoda
- Class: Insecta
- Order: Lepidoptera
- Family: Pieridae
- Genus: Belenois
- Species: B. diminuta

Binomial name
- Belenois diminuta Butler, 1894

Synonyms
- Belenois zochalia var. tanganjikae Lanz, 1896; Belenois zochalia crawshayi f. flavilla Talbot, 1943

= Belenois diminuta =

Species of butterfly

Belenois diminuta is a butterfly in the family Pieridae. It is found in the Democratic Republic of the Congo, Tanzania and northern and central Zambia. The habitat consists of Brachystegia woodland.
