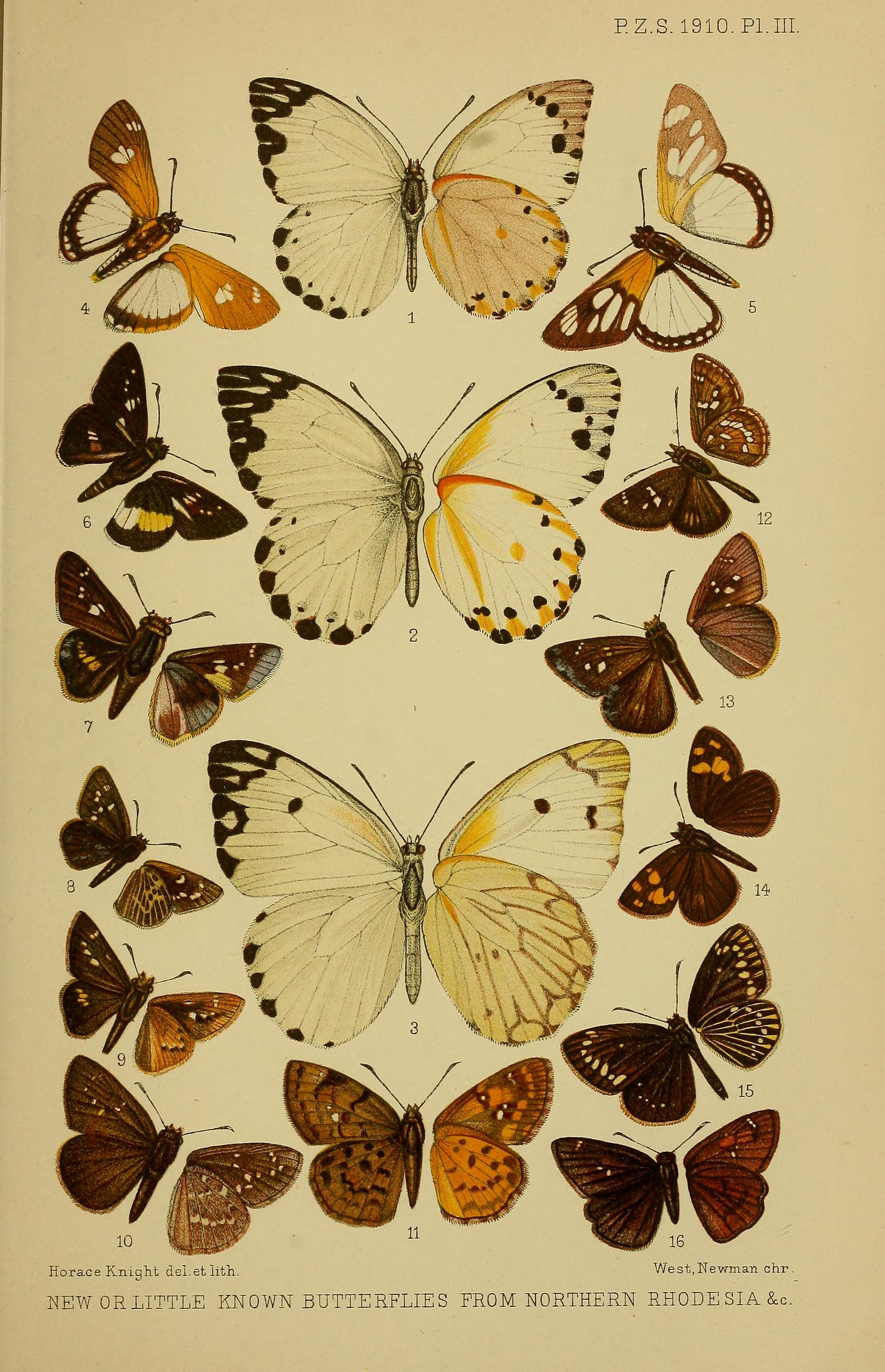
- Belenois crawshayi, figure 3

Scientific classification
- Kingdom: Animalia
- Phylum: Arthropoda
- Clade: Pancrustacea
- Class: Insecta
- Order: Lepidoptera
- Family: Pieridae
- Genus: Belenois
- Species: B. crawshayi

Binomial name
- Belenois crawshayi Butler, 1894

Synonyms
- Pieris continentalis Heyn, 1904; Belenois crawshayi f. lata Neave, 1910; Pieris crawshayi ab. pygmaeana Strand, 1911; Belenois zochalia crawshayi f. sagittata Talbot, 1943; Belenois zochalia crawshayi f. flavistriga Talbot, 1943; Anapheis crawshayi lata f. obscura Dufrane, 1948; Anapheis crawshayi lata f. decipiens Dufrane, 1948; Anapheis crawshayi lata f. juncta Dufrane, 1948; Anapheis crawshayi lata f. immaculata Dufrane, 1948

= Belenois crawshayi =

Crawshay's white

Species of butterfly

Belenois crawshayi, Crawshay's white, is a butterfly in the family Pieridae. It is found in Angola, Tanzania, Zambia, Malawi, Rwanda, Burundi, the western part of the Democratic Republic of the Congo, western Kenya and Uganda. The habitat consists of woodland and forest margins.

The larvae feed on Capparis species.
