= Belenois albomaculatus =

Scientific classification
- Kingdom: Animalia
- Phylum: Arthropoda
- Class: Insecta
- Order: Lepidoptera
- Family: Pieridae
- Genus: Belenois
- Species: B. albomaculatus

Binomial name
- Belenois albomaculatus (Goeze, 1779)

Synonyms
- Papilio albomaculatus Goeze, 1779

Species of butterfly

Belenois albomaculatus is a butterfly in the family Pieridae.

== Taxonomy ==
The status and position of this species is unknown, it is possibly not even Afrotropical.
