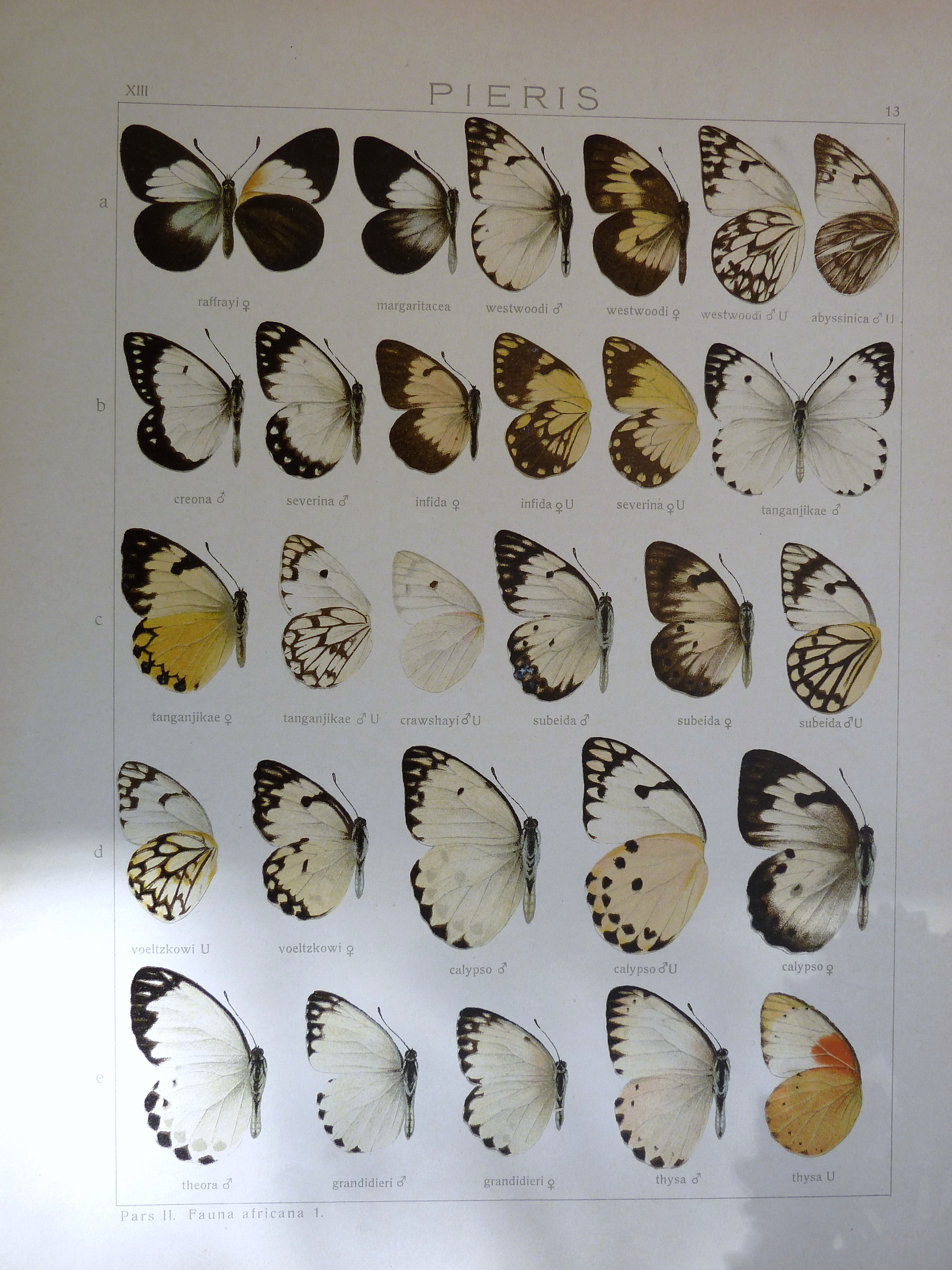
- Belenois subeida in Seitz (c)

Scientific classification
- Kingdom: Animalia
- Phylum: Arthropoda
- Clade: Pancrustacea
- Class: Insecta
- Order: Lepidoptera
- Family: Pieridae
- Genus: Belenois
- Species: B. subeida

Binomial name
- Belenois subeida (Felder & Felder, 1865)

Synonyms
- Pieris subeida Felder & Felder, 1865; Belenois instabilis Butler, 1888; Belenois subeida subeida f. demarginata Talbot, 1943; Pieris frobeniusi Strand, 1909; Pieris zoraida Gaede, 1915; Belenois subeida voltaensis Talbot, 1943; Pieris calypso hailo Ungemach, 1932; Pieris calypso f. ochracea Ungemach, 1932; Pieris calypso f. hiemalis Ungemach, 1932; Belenois subeida hiemalis Talbot, 1943; Belenois subeida hiemalis f. auristriga Talbot, 1943; Belenois sylvander Grose-Smith, 1890; Belenois instabilis f. arens Talbot, 1943; Belenois subeida f. circe Stoneham, 1957; Belenois subeida f. ignescens Stoneham, 1957; Belenois subeida f. galatea Stoneham, 1957; Belenois subeida f. achaeus Stoneham, 1957

= Belenois subeida =

Northern caper white

Species of butterfly

Belenois subeida, the northern caper white, is a butterfly in the family Pieridae. It is found in Guinea, Burkina Faso, Ivory Coast, Ghana, Nigeria, Cameroon, Sudan, the Democratic Republic of the Congo, the Central African Republic, Ethiopia, Kenya, Uganda and Tanzania. The habitat consists of forests and dense woodland.

The larvae feed on Capparis, Maerua and Ritchiea species.

== Subspecies ==
- Belenois subeida subeida (Sudan, northern and eastern Democratic Republic of the Congo, Central African Republic, northern Uganda)
- Belenois subeida frobeniusi (Strand, 1909) (Guinea, Burkina Faso, northern Ivory Coast, Ghana, Nigeria, northern Cameroon)
- Belenois subeida hailo (Ungemach, 1932) (Ethiopia)
- Belenois subeida sylvander Grose-Smith, 1890 (Uganda, western Kenya, Tanzania)

Torben Larsen developed a species numbering system for his 2005 publication Butterflies of West Africa. The subspecies frobeniusi is #72. The 'Larsen' numbers have since been used with permission in A Sharp Eye on Butterflies of Ghana.
