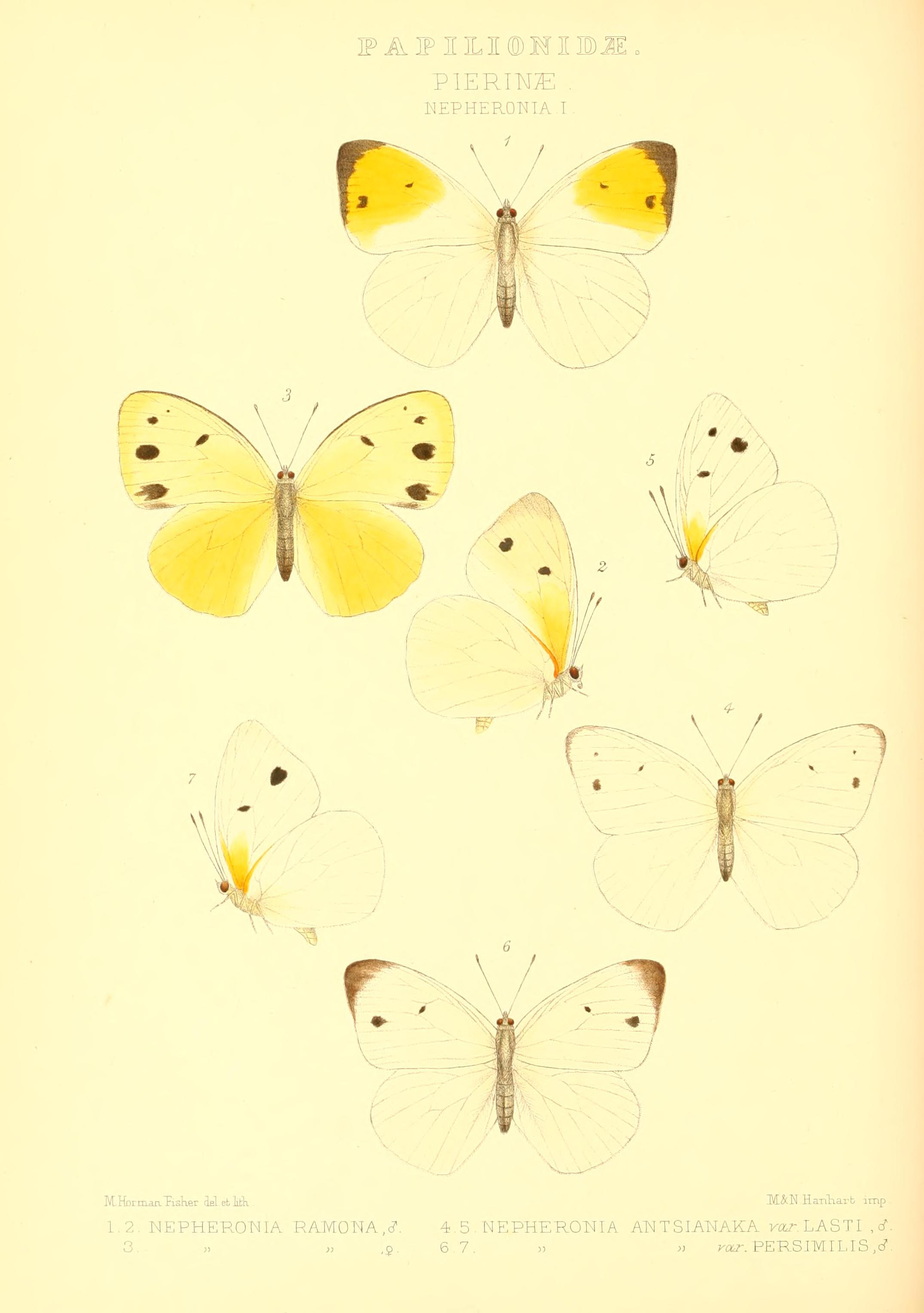
- Belenois antsianaka figures 1-6

Scientific classification
- Kingdom: Animalia
- Phylum: Arthropoda
- Class: Insecta
- Order: Lepidoptera
- Family: Pieridae
- Genus: Belenois
- Species: B. antsianaka

Binomial name
- Belenois antsianaka (Ward, 1870)

Synonyms
- Pieris antsianaka Ward, 1870; Pieris affinis Mabille, 1879; Pieris ramona Grose-Smith, 1891; Belenois antsianaka var. drurii Grose-Smith and Kirby, 1892; Belenois antsianaka var. persimilis Grose-Smith and Kirby, 1892; Pieris antsianaka f. aurantia Le Cerf, 1928

= Belenois antsianaka =

Species of butterfly

Belenois antsianaka is a butterfly in the family Pieridae. It is found on Madagascar. The habitat consists of forest margins and unnatural grassland.
