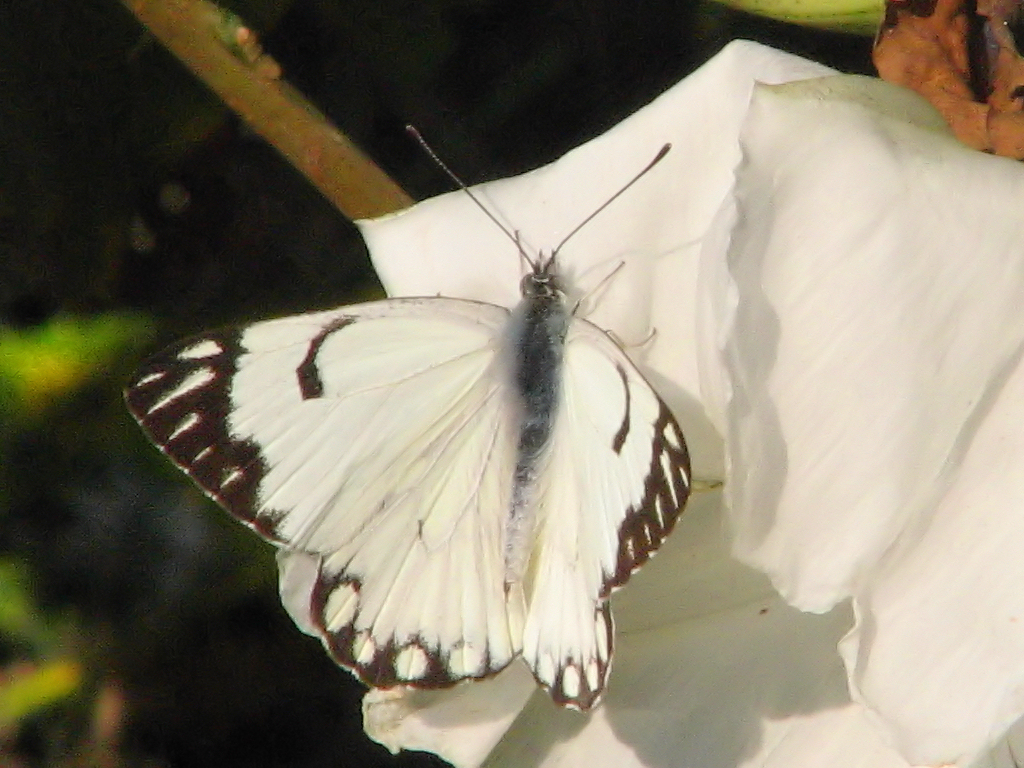
- African caper white (B. aurota), Agra, India

Scientific classification
- Kingdom: Animalia
- Phylum: Arthropoda
- Class: Insecta
- Order: Lepidoptera
- Family: Pieridae
- Tribe: Pierini
- Genus: Belenois; Hübner, [1819]

Species
- See text

Synonyms
- Anaphaeis (Hübner, 1819); Glycestha (Billberg, 1820); Pseudohuphina (Stoneham, 1940); Pseudanaphaeis (Bernard, 1953)

= Belenois =

Butterfly genus in family Pieridae

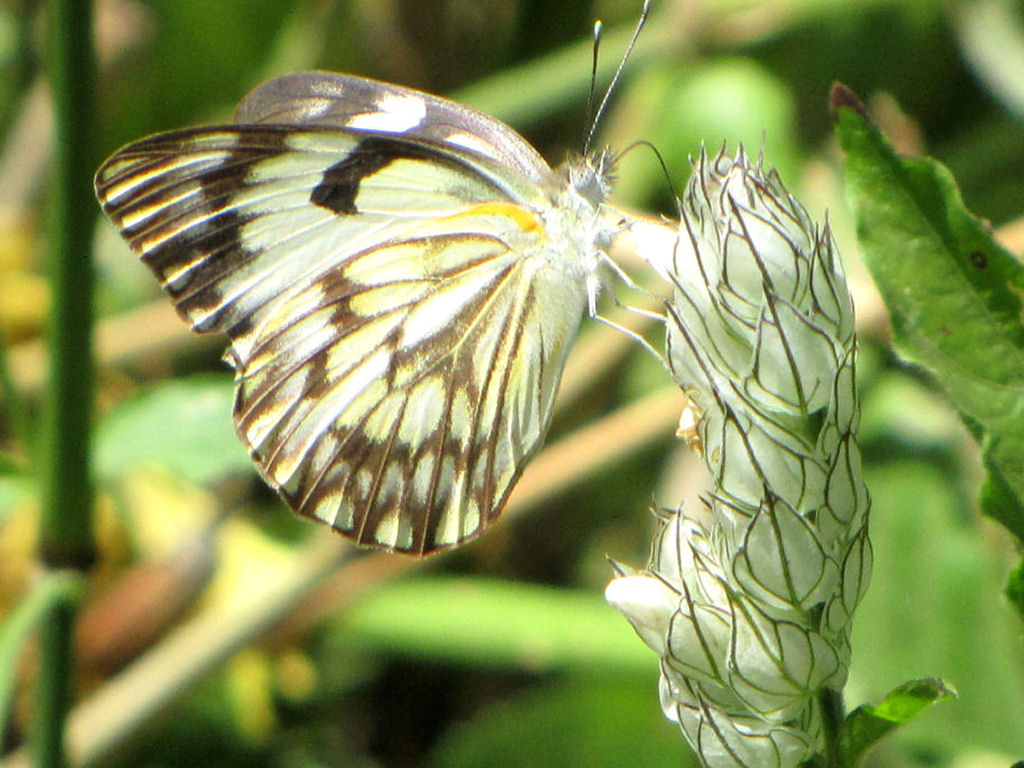
African veined white (B. gidica, Lake Manyara National Park, Tanzania

Belenois, commonly called the caper whites, is a genus of butterflies of the subfamily Pierini in the family Pieridae that are found in mainly in Africa and south-west Asia.

== Species ==
Subgenus Anaphaeis Hübner, 1819:

- Belenois aurota (Fabricius, 1793) – brown-veined white, African caper white, or pioneer white
- Belenois creona (Cramer, 1776) – African common white or African caper
- Belenois gidica (Godart, 1819) – African veined white or pointed caper

Species group pseudohuphina:

- Belenois margaritacea Sharpe, 1891 – Margarita's caper white
- Belenois raffrayi (Oberthür, 1878) – Raffray's white

Group Incertae sedis:

- Belenois albomaculatus (Goeze, 1779)
- Belenois aldabrensis (Holland, 1896)
- Belenois anomala (Butler, 1881)
- Belenois antsianaka (Ward, 1870)
- Belenois calypso (Drury, 1773) – Calypso caper white
- Belenois crawshayi Butler, 1894 – Crawshay's caper white
- Belenois diminuta Butler, 1894
- Belenois grandidieri (Mabille, 1878)
- Belenois hedyle (Cramer, 1777)
- Belenois helcida (Boisduval, 1833)
- Belenois java (Linnaeus, 1768) – caper white
- Belenois larima (Boisduval, 1836)
- Belenois mabella Grose-Smith, 1891
- Belenois ogygia (Trimen, 1883)
- Belenois rubrosignata (Weymer, 1901) – red-edged white
- Belenois solilucis Butler, 1874
- Belenois subeida (C. & R. Felder, 1865)
- Belenois sudanensis (Talbot, 1929) – Sudan caper white
- Belenois theora (Doubleday, 1846)
- Belenois theuszi Dewitz, 1889
- Belenois thysa (Hopffer, 1855) – false dotted border
- Belenois victoria (Dixey, 1915) – Victoria white
- Belenois welwitschii Rogenhofer, 1890
- Belenois zochalia (Boisduval, 1836) – forest white or forest caper white
