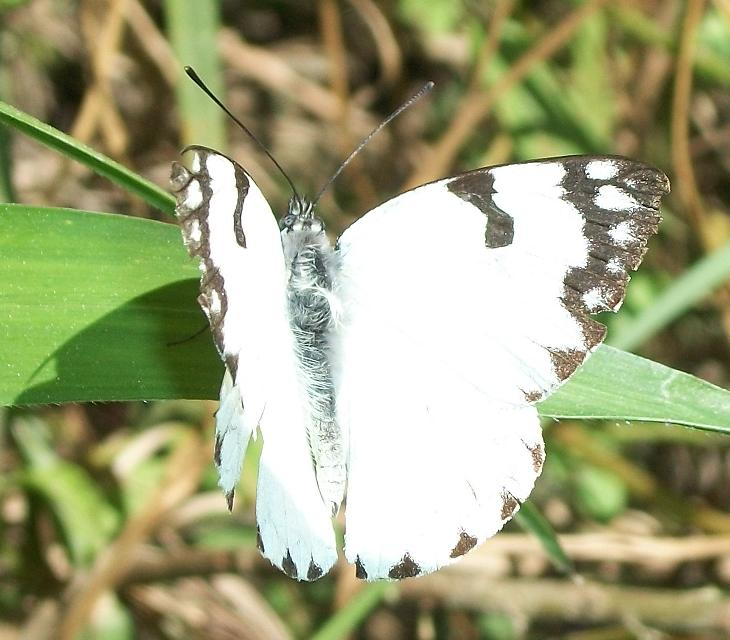
- Male B. z. zochalia from KwaZulu-Natal, South Africa
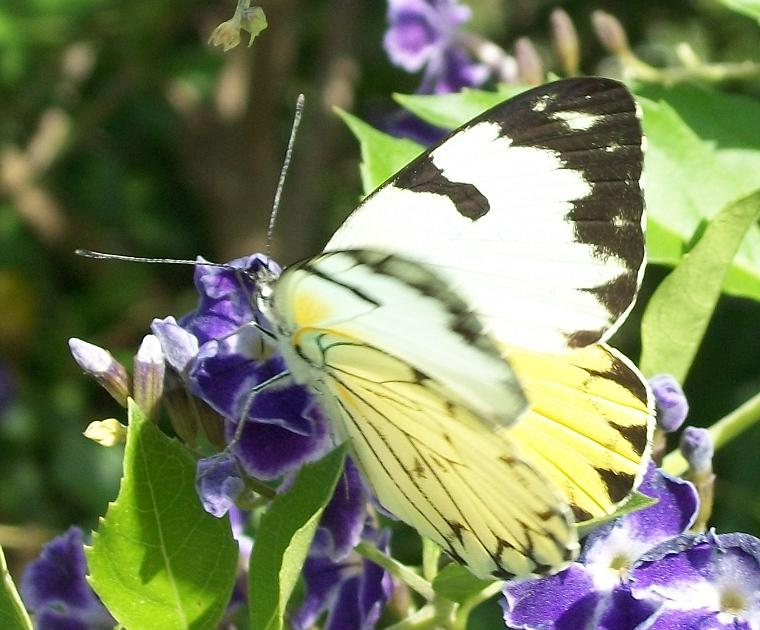
- Female B. z. zochalia from KwaZulu-Natal, South Africa

Scientific classification
- Kingdom: Animalia
- Phylum: Arthropoda
- Clade: Pancrustacea
- Class: Insecta
- Order: Lepidoptera
- Family: Pieridae
- Genus: Belenois
- Species: B. zochalia

Binomial name
- Belenois zochalia (Boisduval, 1836)

Synonyms
- Pieris zochalia Boisduval, 1836; Pieris agrippinides Holland, 1896; Pieris hyoma Boisduval, 1836; Pieris zochalia var. immaculata Wichgraf, 1913; Pieris zochalia var. pondoana Neustetter, 1916; Pieris zochalia var. pondoana ab. flavipennis Neustetter, 1916; Pieris zochalia f. reducta Le Doux, 1923; Pieris zochalia f. grisea Le Doux, 1923; Pieris zochalia f. elly Le Doux, 1923; Belenois zochalia f. silvano Stoneham, 1957; Belenois zochalia f. marjoria Stoneham, 1957; Belenois formosa Butler, 1898; Belenois zochalia var. ochracea Heron, 1909; Pieris zochalia ab. bryki Aurivillius, 1925; Belenois zochalia agrippinides f. latilimbalis Talbot, 1943; Belenois zochalia f. veronica Stoneham, 1957; Pieris crawshayi connexiva Joicey & Talbot, 1927; Belenois zochalia camerunica Bernardi, 1966; Pieris zochalia galla Ungemach, 1932; Pieris zochalia depunctata Ungemach, 1932

= Belenois zochalia =

Species of butterfly

Belenois zochalia, the forest white or forest caper white, is a butterfly of the family Pieridae. It is found in Africa.

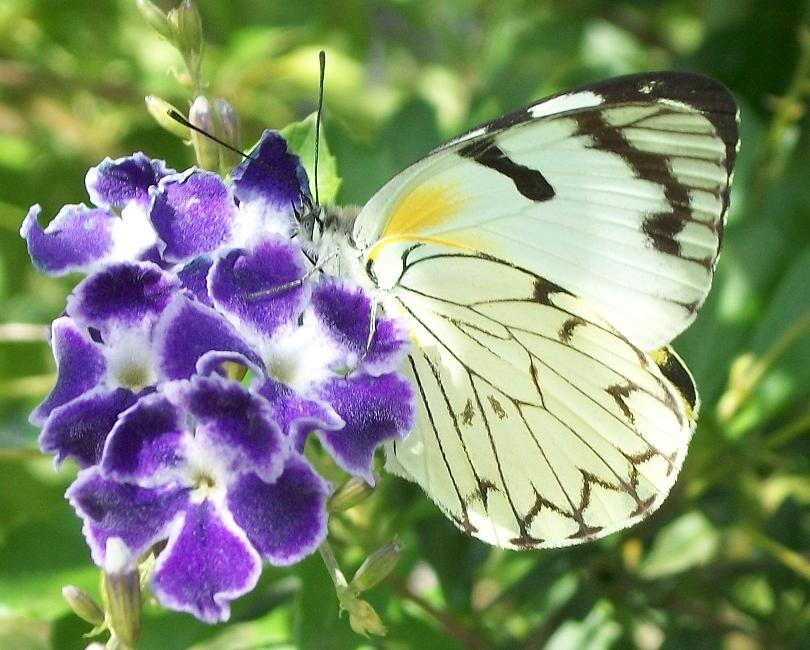
Side view of female B. z. zochalia

The wingspan is 40–50 mm. Adults are on wing year-round in warm areas.

The larvae feed on Capparis species, Maerua cafra and Maerua racemulosa.

== Subspecies ==
- B. z. zochalia (South Africa, Zimbabwe)
- B. z. agrippinides (Holland, 1896) (Malawi, Tanzania, Kenya, Uganda)
- B. z. connexiva (Joicey & Talbot, 1927) (highlands of Cameroon)
- B. z. galla (Ungemach, 1932) (Ethiopia)
- B. z. camerounica Bernardi, 1966 (Nigeria to Cameroon)
