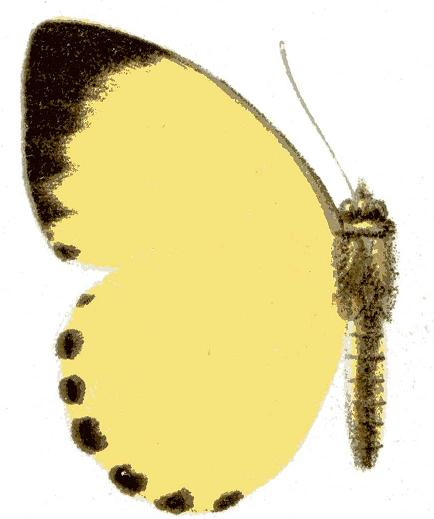

Scientific classification
- Kingdom: Animalia
- Phylum: Arthropoda
- Class: Insecta
- Order: Lepidoptera
- Family: Pieridae
- Genus: Belenois
- Species: B. solilucis

Binomial name
- Belenois solilucis Butler, 1874

Synonyms
- Pseudopontia sulphurescens Capronnier, 1889; Mylothris caere Rogenhofer, 1890; Mylothris agylla Rogenhofer, 1890; Phrissura narcissus Butler, 1898; Pieris glucki Suffert, 1904; Pieris abti Suffert, 1904; Pieris frommi Strand, 1911; Pieris solilucis var. subornata Schultze, 1914; Pieris theuszi ab. ochracea Aurivillius, 1925; Pieris theuszi ab. albida Aurivillius, 1925; Belenois solilucis f. citronata Talbot, 1943; Belenois solilucis f. incitronata Talbot, 1943; Belenois solilucis f. oesypera Talbot, 1943; Pieris solilucis var. loveni Aurivillius, 1921; Pieris solilucis f. sabulosa Joicey and Talbot, 1921; Pieris solilucis f. appioides Ungemach, 1932; Pieris solilucis f. hemichrysa Ungemach, 1932; Belenois solilucis f. marginepuncta Talbot, 1943; Belenois solilucis f. telephassa Stoneham, 1957; Belenois solilucis f. coronis Stoneham, 1957; Belenois solilucis f. daphne Stoneham, 1957; Belenois solilucis f. procis Stoneham, 1957; Belenois solilucis f. eurydice Stoneham, 1957

= Belenois solilucis =

Yellow caper white

Species of butterfly

Belenois solilucis, the yellow caper white, is a butterfly in the family Pieridae. It is found in Nigeria, Cameroon, Gabon, Angola, the Central African Republic, the Democratic Republic of the Congo, Uganda, Sudan, Ethiopia, Kenya and Tanzania. The habitat consists of lowland to sub-montane forests.

The larvae feed on Capparis tomentosa, Ritchiea and Maerua species.

== Subspecies ==
- Belenois solilucis solilucis (south-eastern Nigeria, Cameroon, Gabon, northern Angola, Central African Republic, Democratic Republic of the Congo)
- Belenois solilucis loveni (Aurivillius, 1921) (north-eastern Democratic Republic of the Congo, Uganda, southern Sudan, south-western Ethiopia, western Kenya, western Tanzania)
