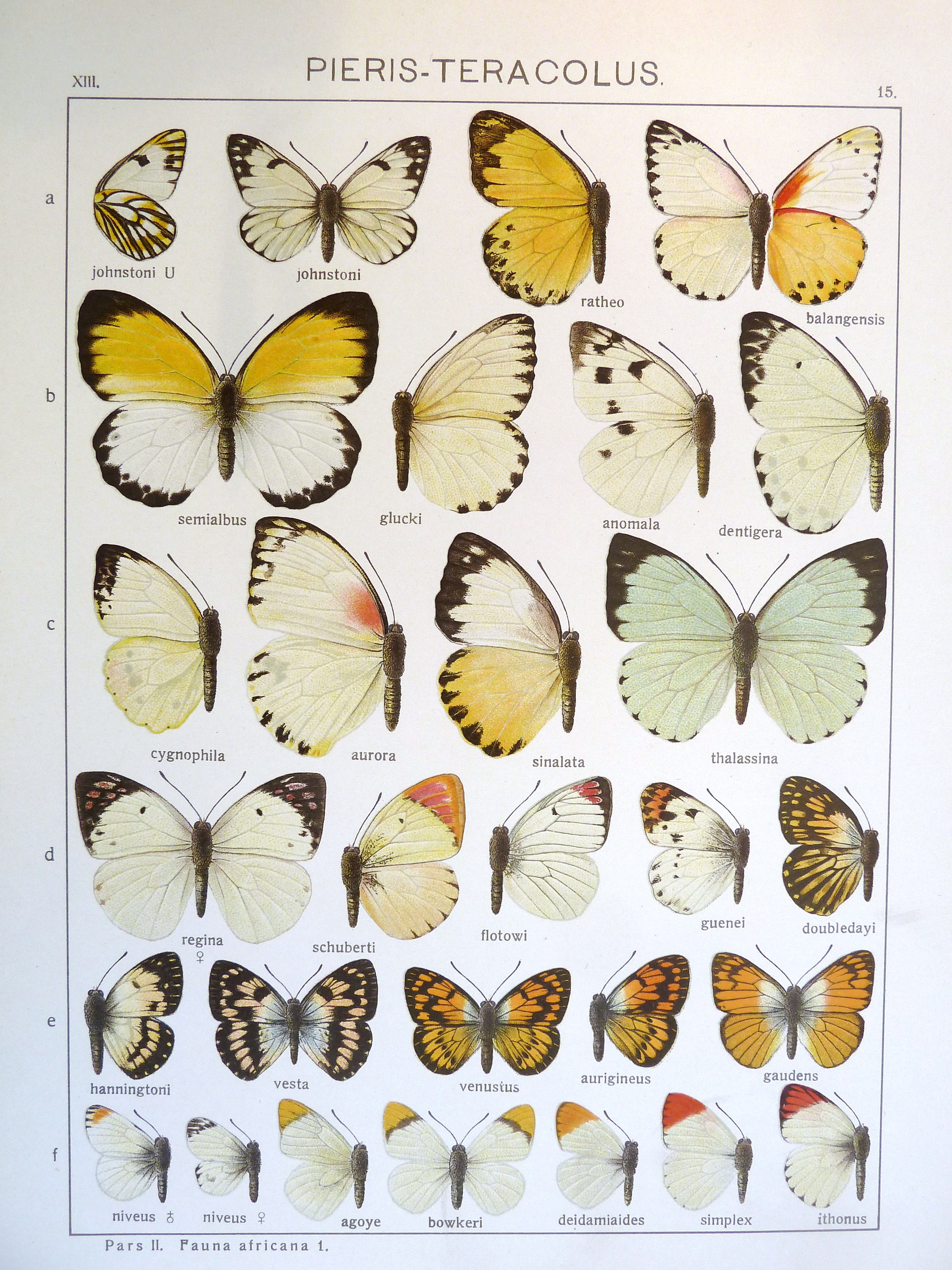
- b

Scientific classification
- Kingdom: Animalia
- Phylum: Arthropoda
- Class: Insecta
- Order: Lepidoptera
- Family: Pieridae
- Genus: Belenois
- Species: B. anomala

Binomial name
- Belenois anomala (Butler, 1881)

Synonyms
- Synchloe anomala Butler, 1881

= Belenois anomala =

Species of butterfly

Belenois anomala is a butterfly in the family Pieridae. It is found on Socotra.
