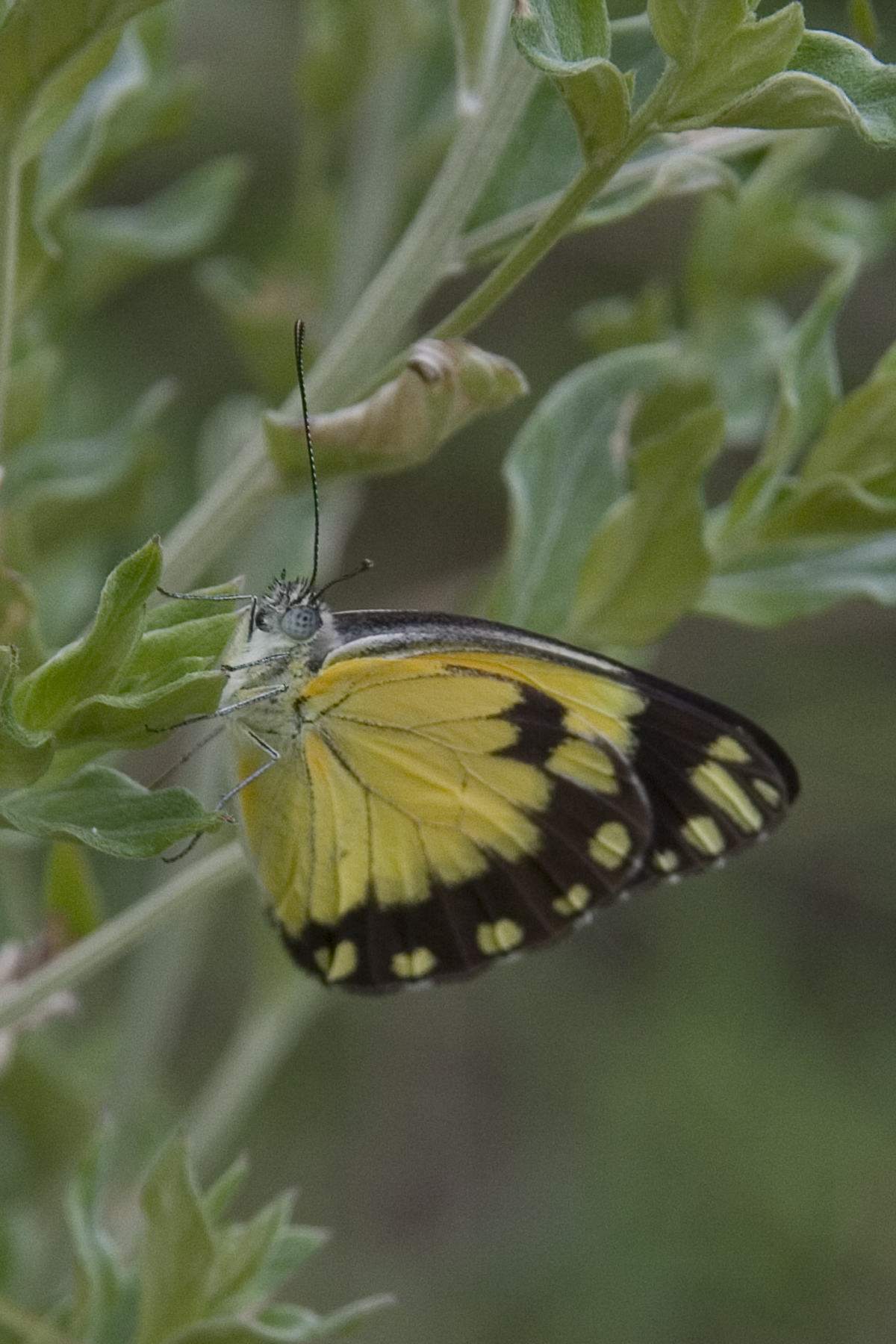
- Female in wet season

Scientific classification
- Kingdom: Animalia
- Phylum: Arthropoda
- Clade: Pancrustacea
- Class: Insecta
- Order: Lepidoptera
- Family: Pieridae
- Genus: Belenois
- Species: B. creona

Binomial name
- Belenois creona (Cramer, 1776)

Subspecies
- See text

Synonyms
- Papilio creona Cramer, [1776]; Anaphaeis creona; Papilio cneora Fabricius, 1793; Colias ernestius Laporte, 1831; Pieris creona ab. caeca Cannaviello, 1900; Pieris severina ab. sigirrensis Strand, 1909; Anapheis creona ab. houzeaui Dufrane, 1947; Glycestha creona r. benadirensis Storace, 1948; Pieris boguensis Felder & Felder, 1865; Pieris creona f. mixta Ungemach, 1932; Pieris elisa van Vollenhoven, 1869; Belenois johannae Butler, 1879; Belenois leucogyne Butler, 1885; Anapheis creona prorsus Talbot, 1943; Belenois creona prorsus f. antonii Bernardi, 1951; Papilio severina Stoll, 1781; Pieris agrippina Felder and Felder, 1865; Belenois infida Butler, 1888; Pieris severina ab. msamwiana Strand, 1911; Pieris guarani Köhler, 1923; Pieris severina f. acutapex Hulstaert, 1924; Pieris severina f. burgeoni Hulstaert, 1924; Pieris severina f. obscurissima Hulstaert, 1924; Pieris creona f. subalba Hulstaert, 1924; Anapheis creona ab. demaneti Dufrane, 1947; Anapheis creona ab. evrardi Dufrane, 1947; Anapheis creona ab. gnoma Dufrane, 1947; Anapheis creona f. mombasica Stoneham, 1957; Anapheis creona f. creonoides Stoneham, 1957; Anapheis creona f. creontica Stoneham, 1957; Anapheis creona f. nigerrima Stoneham, 1957; Anapheis creona f. jocasta Stoneham, 1957; Anapheis creona f. megara Stoneham, 1957

= Belenois creona =

African common white

Species of butterfly

Belenois creona, the African common white or African caper, is a butterfly in the family Pieridae. It is found in the Afrotropical realm.

== Description ==
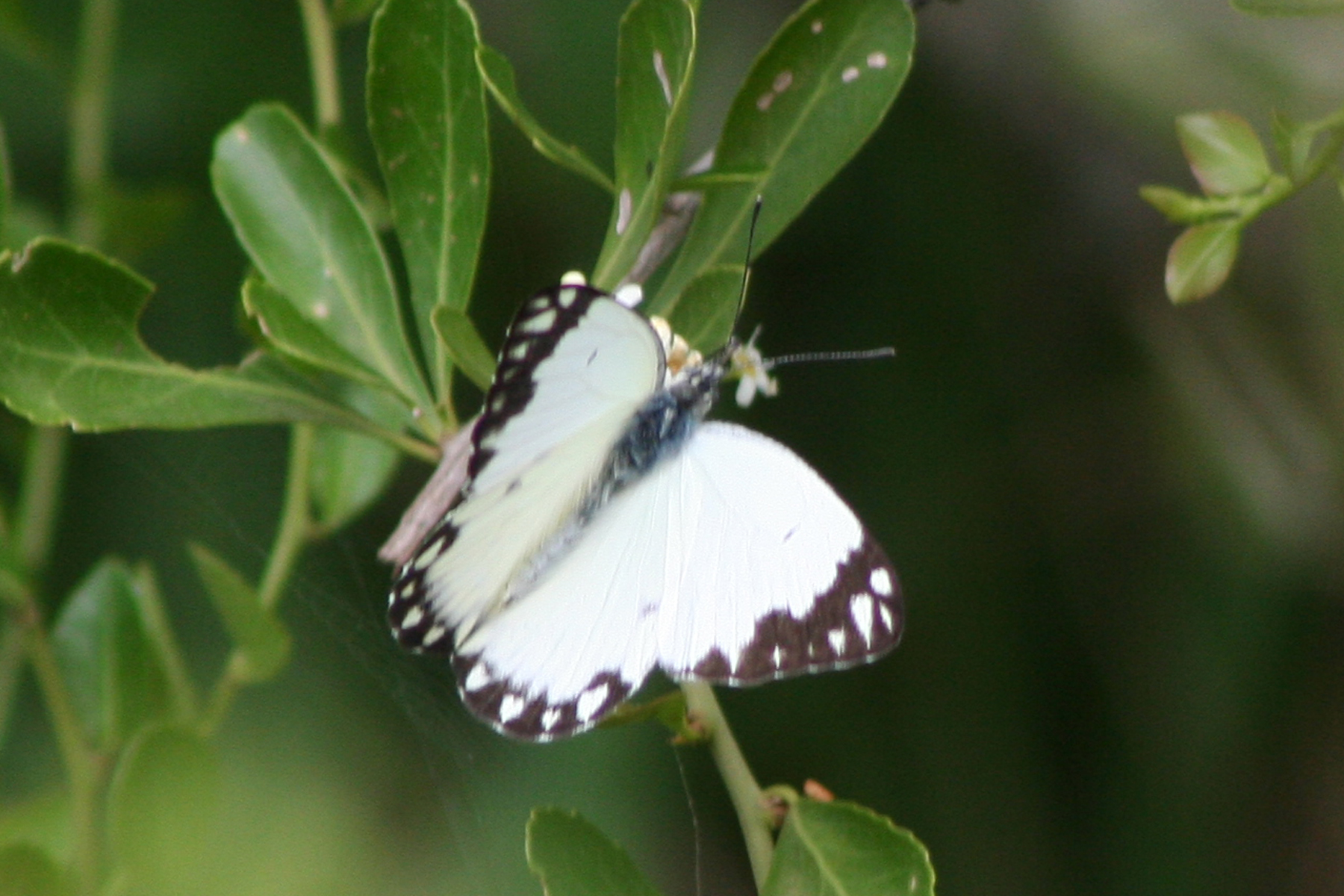

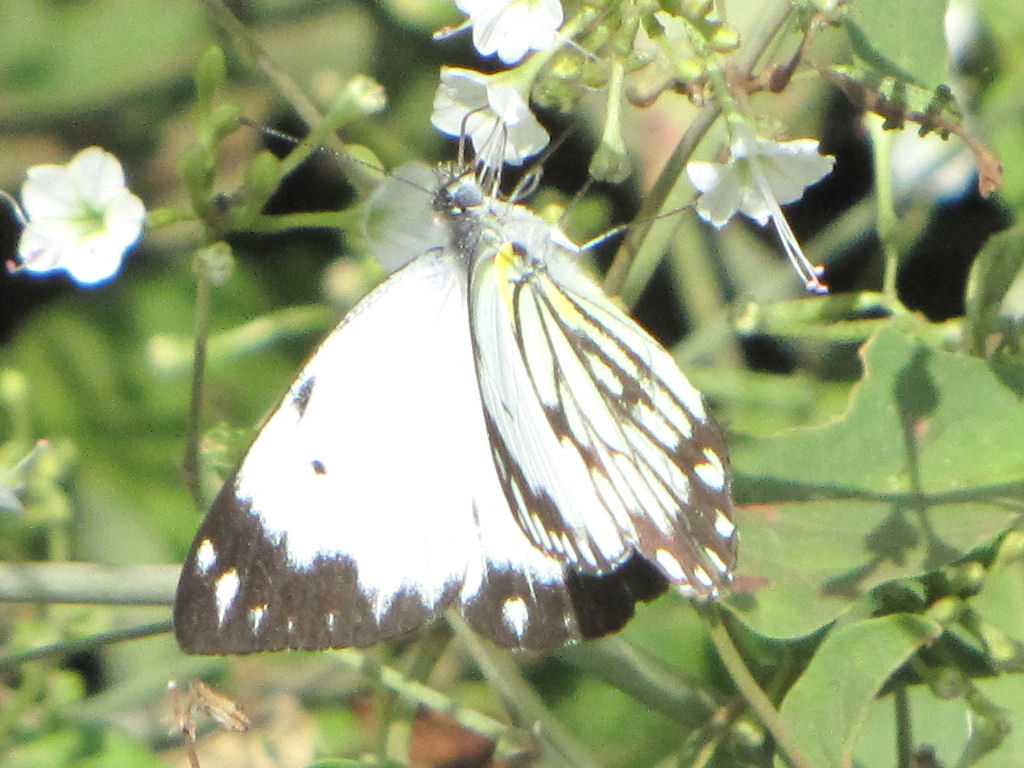
B. c. severina, Tanzania

The wingspan is 40–45 mm. The sexes are dimorphic.

=== Males ===
Uppersides are white with black or brown marginal borders and veins in forewing apex. There is a black spot in the upperside cell, instead of a bar as in the brown-veined white (B. aurota).

=== Females ===
Females have broader dark upperside borders on both wings. Underwings are yellow during the wet season.

== Ecology ==
The larvae feed on Capparis and Maerua species.

== Subspecies ==
The following subspecies are recognised:

- B. c. creona (Senegal to Nigeria, Sudan, east Ethiopia)
- B. c. benadirensis (in Somalia)
- B. c. boguensis Ethiopia
- B. c. elisa (on the Comoros)
- B. c. leucogyne (on the Arabian Peninsula)
- B. c. prorsus (on Madagascar)
- B. c. severina (South Africa to east Africa, Democratic Republic of the Congo)

Torben Larsen developed a species numbering system for his 2005 publication Butterflies of West Africa. The nominate subspecies is #69. The 'Larsen' numbers have since been used with permission in A Sharp Eye on Butterflies of Ghana.
