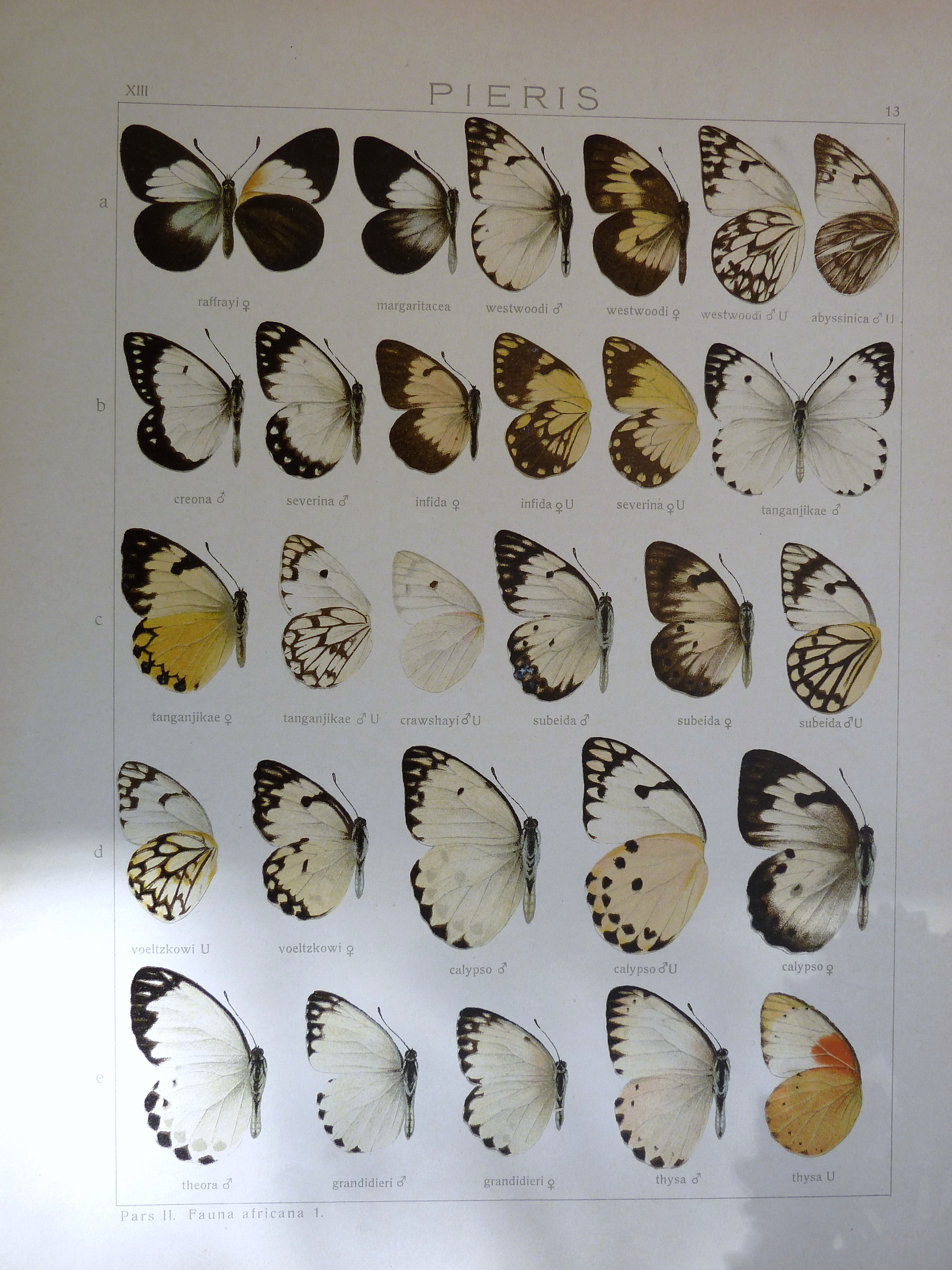
- e

Scientific classification
- Kingdom: Animalia
- Phylum: Arthropoda
- Class: Insecta
- Order: Lepidoptera
- Family: Pieridae
- Genus: Belenois
- Species: B. grandidieri

Binomial name
- Belenois grandidieri (Mabille, 1878)

Synonyms
- Pieris grandidieri Mabille, 1878; Pieris voeltzkowi Karsh, 1900

= Belenois grandidieri =

Species of butterfly

Belenois grandidieri is a butterfly in the family Pieridae. It is found on Madagascar and the Seychelles. The habitat consists of forests and forest margins.
