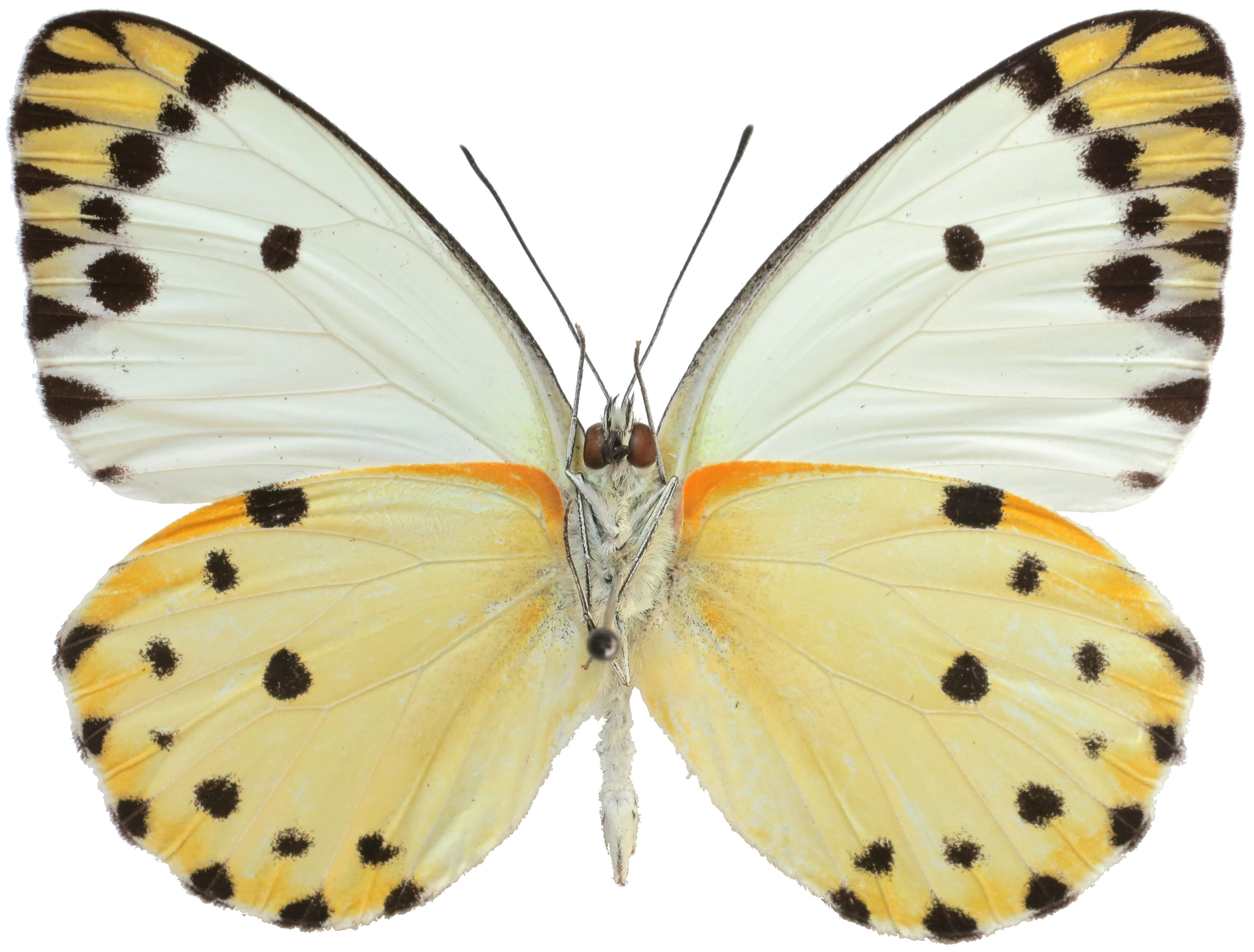
- Male (ventral) fromx Mabira Forest, Uganda

Scientific classification
- Kingdom: Animalia
- Phylum: Arthropoda
- Class: Insecta
- Order: Lepidoptera
- Family: Pieridae
- Genus: Belenois
- Species: B. sudanensis

Binomial name
- Belenois sudanensis (Talbot, 1929)

Synonyms
- Pieris calypso sudanensis Talbot, 1929; Belenois sudanensis pseudodentigera f. bicolor Berger, 1981; Belenois sudanensis pseudodentigera f. unicolor Berger, 1981

= Belenois sudanensis =

Sudan caper white

Species of butterfly

Belenois sudanensis, the Sudan caper white, is a butterfly in the family Pieridae. It is found in Cameroon, Sudan, the Central African Republic, the Republic of the Congo, the Democratic Republic of the Congo, Uganda, Kenya and Tanzania. The habitat consists of lowland evergreen forests.

The larvae feed on Clerodendrum species.

== Subspecies ==
- Belenois sudanensis sudanensis (southern Sudan, western Kenya)
- Belenois sudanensis katalensis Berger, 1981 (Democratic Republic of the Congo, eastern and central Uganda)
- Belenois sudanensis mayumbana Berger, 1981 (Democratic Republic of the Congo)
- Belenois sudanensis pseudodentigera Berger, 1981 (Cameroon, Central African Republic, Congo, Democratic Republic of the Congo, Tanzania)
