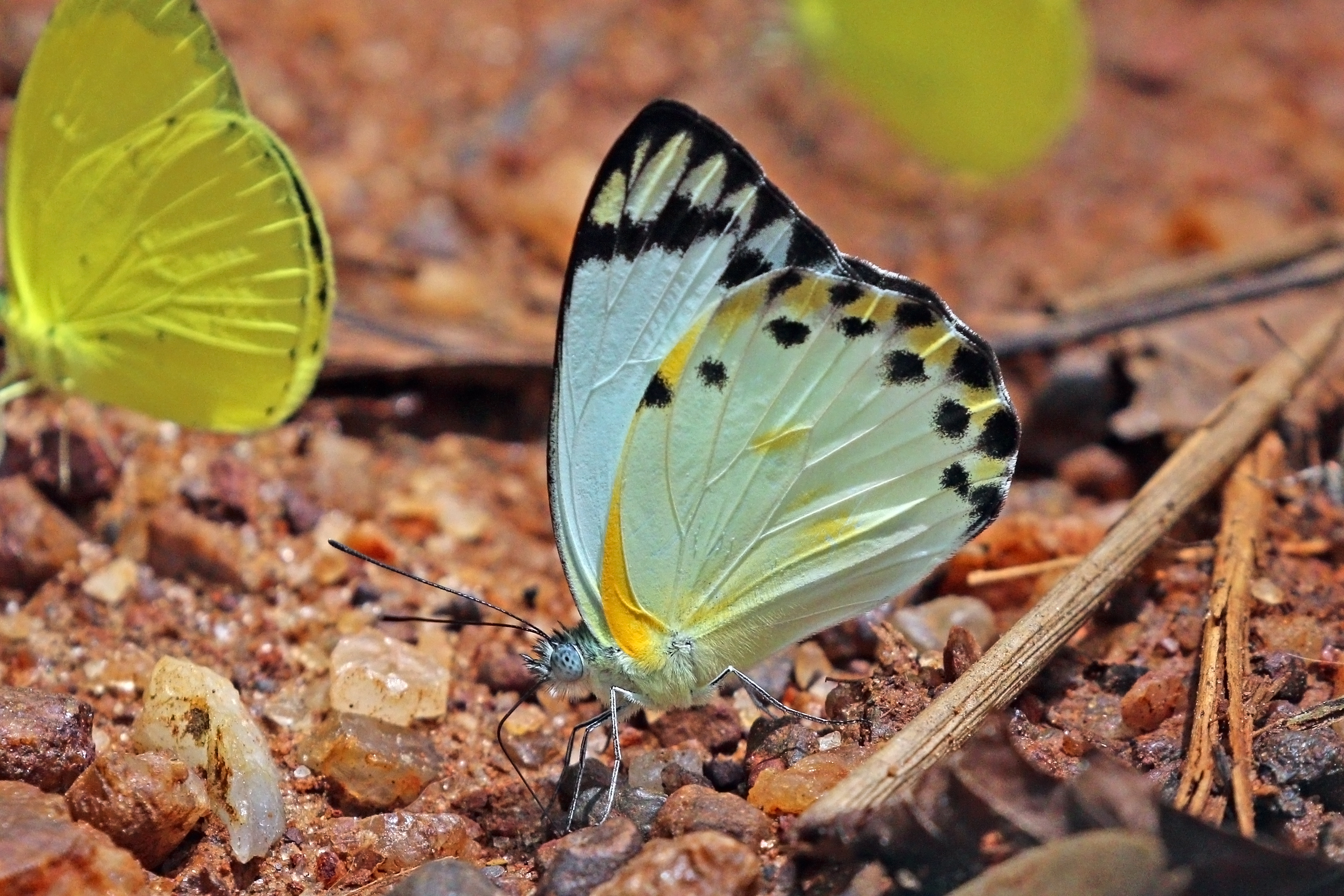
- male B. t. theora Bobiri Forest, Ghana

Scientific classification
- Kingdom: Animalia
- Phylum: Arthropoda
- Clade: Pancrustacea
- Class: Insecta
- Order: Lepidoptera
- Family: Pieridae
- Genus: Belenois
- Species: B. theora

Binomial name
- Belenois theora (Doubleday, 1846)

Synonyms
- Pieris theora Doubleday, 1846; Pieris paroreia Hewitson, 1869; Pieris sylvarum Mabille, 1890; Belenois theora theora f. brevimacula Talbot, 1943; Pieris theora var. laeta Weymer, 1903; Pieris lortzingi Suffert, 1904; Belenois theora lortzingi f. lacteola Talbot, 1943; Belenois theora parvimacula Talbot, 1943; Pieris theora ratheo Suffert, 1904; Pieris theora ab. concolor Aurivillius, 1899; Pieris theora ab. maculata Aurivillius, 1899; Pieris theora ab. obscurata Hulstaert, 1924; Pieris theora weidholzi Rebel, 1930; Belenois theora concolor f. sulfurata Talbot, 1943

= Belenois theora =

Forest caper white

Species of butterfly

Belenois theora, the forest caper white, is a butterfly in the family Pieridae. It is found in Guinea, Liberia, Ivory Coast, Ghana, Togo, Benin, Nigeria, Cameroon, the Central African Republic, the Democratic Republic of the Congo, Uganda, Sudan and Tanzania. The habitat consists of woodland and forest margins.

The larvae feed on Capparis species.

== Subspecies ==
- B. t. theora Sierra Leone to Nigeria
- B. t. ratheo (Suffert, 1904) Central African Republic
- B. t. laeta (Weymer, 1903)

Torben Larsen developed a species numbering system for his 2005 publication Butterflies of West Africa. The nominate subspecies is #74. The 'Larsen' numbers have since been used with permission in A Sharp Eye on Butterflies of Ghana.
