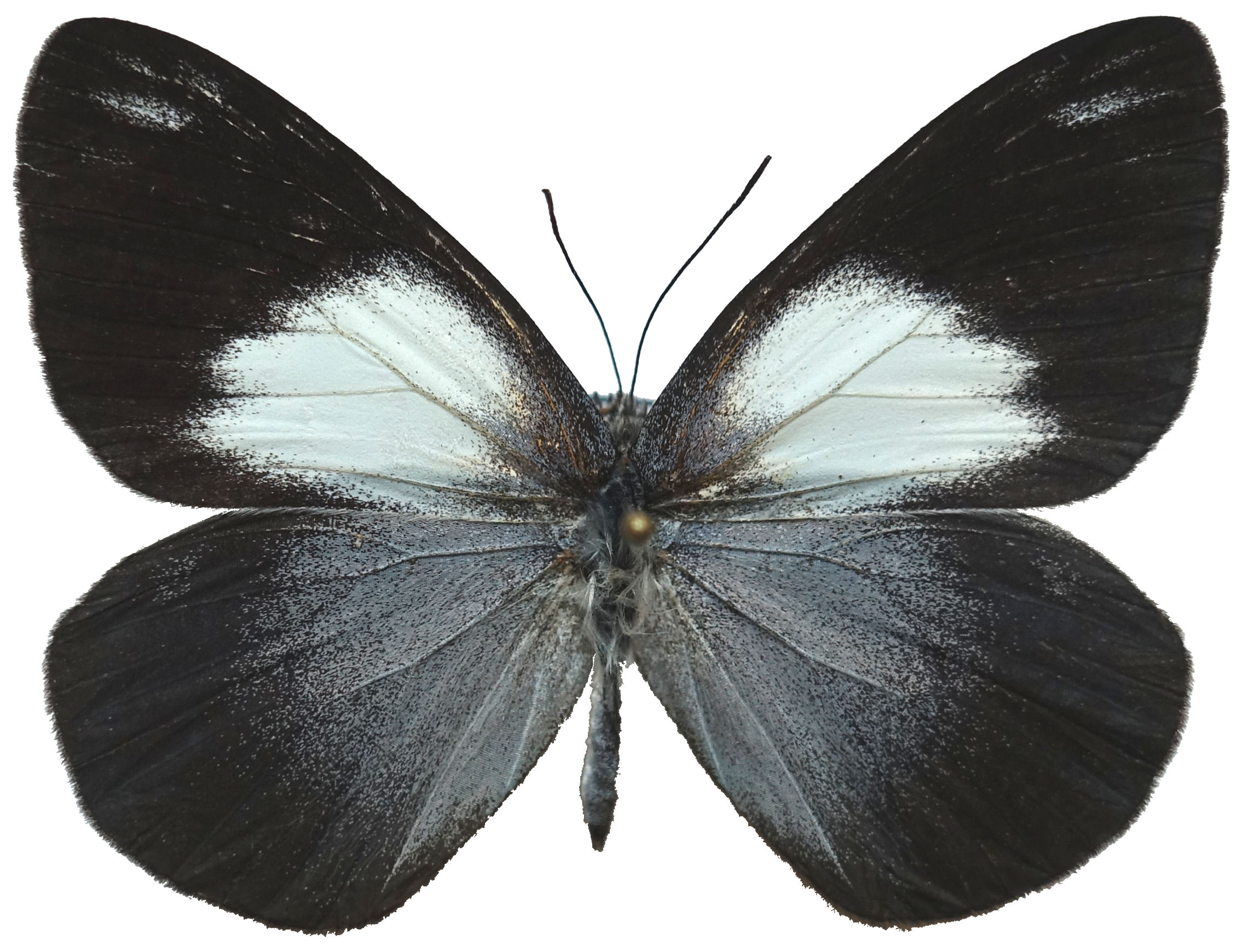
- Belenois raffrayi extendens - Budongo Forest - Uganda

Scientific classification
- Kingdom: Animalia
- Phylum: Arthropoda
- Class: Insecta
- Order: Lepidoptera
- Family: Pieridae
- Genus: Belenois
- Species: B. raffrayi

Binomial name
- Belenois raffrayi (Oberthür, 1878)

Synonyms
- Pieris raffrayi Oberthür, 1878; Pieris raffrayi extendens Joicey & Talbot, 1927; Anapheis raffrayi ab. intermedia Dufrane, 1945; Anapheis raffrayi extendens f. extrema Dufrane, 1948

= Belenois raffrayi =

Raffray's white

Species of butterfly

Belenois raffrayi, or Raffray's white, is a butterfly in the family Pieridae. It is found in Ethiopia, Sudan, Uganda, Kenya, Rwanda, Burundi, the Democratic Republic of the Congo and Tanzania. The habitat consists of montane forests and open grassland.

The larvae feed on Capparis and Rhus species.

== Subspecies ==
- B. r. raffrayi (southern Ethiopia, southern Sudan)
- B. r. extendens (Joicey & Talbot, 1927) (Uganda, western Kenya, Rwanda, Burundi, Democratic Republic of the Congo, north-western Tanzania)
- B. r. similis Kielland, 1978 (Tanzania)
