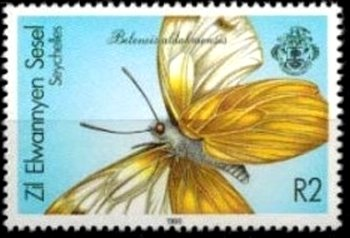
- Belenois aldabrensis on a 1988 stamp of the Seychelles

Scientific classification
- Kingdom: Animalia
- Phylum: Arthropoda
- Class: Insecta
- Order: Lepidoptera
- Family: Pieridae
- Genus: Belenois
- Species: B. aldabrensis

Binomial name
- Belenois aldabrensis (Holland, 1896)

Synonyms
- Teracolus aldabrensis Holland, 1896

= Belenois aldabrensis =

Species of butterfly

Belenois aldabrensis is a butterfly in the family Pieridae. It is found on the Seychelles.
