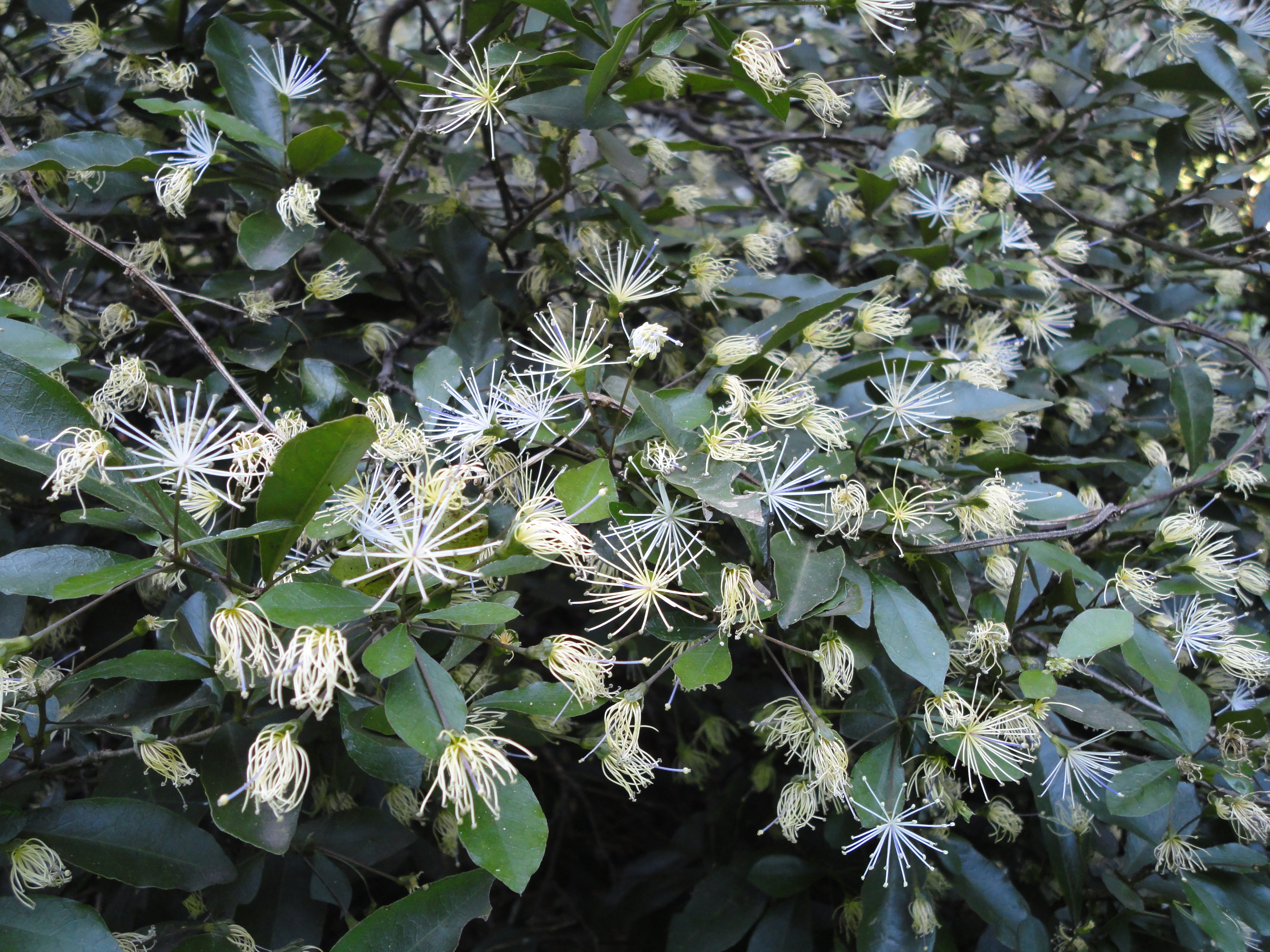
- In Burman Bush, Durban

Scientific classification
- Kingdom: Plantae
- Clade: Tracheophytes
- Clade: Angiosperms
- Clade: Eudicots
- Clade: Rosids
- Order: Brassicales
- Family: Capparaceae
- Genus: Maerua
- Species: M. racemulosa

Binomial name
- Maerua racemulosa Gilg & Gilg-Ben.

Synonyms
- Maerua pedunculosa Sim; Boscia caffra Sond.; Niebuhria pedunculosa Hochst.

= Maerua racemulosa =

Species of tree

Maerua racemulosa is a species of plant in the Capparaceae family, which is almost endemic to South Africa's coastal regions, where it is a constituent of shady forest understory and valley bushveld. They are shrubs or small trees, with mostly simple leaves, and entire margins. They flower profusely in mid-winter. Each flower bears numerous white filaments and a purple style, but no petals. The round fruit appear from August to October. These are yellow when ripe and 1 cm in diameter. It is a food plant for some species of Colotis butterfly.
