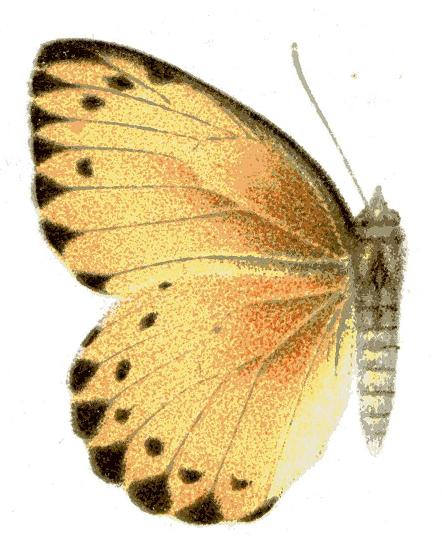

Scientific classification
- Kingdom: Animalia
- Phylum: Arthropoda
- Class: Insecta
- Order: Lepidoptera
- Family: Pieridae
- Genus: Belenois
- Species: B. thysa

Binomial name
- Belenois thysa (Hopffer, 1855)

Synonyms
- Pieris thysa Hopffer, 1855; Pieris larima rimala Suffert, 1904; Pieris thysa malaria Suffert, 1904; Pieris larima alarmi Suffert, 1904; Belenois thysa var. balangensis Rebel and Rogenhofer, 1894; Pieris thysa var. obumbrata Weymer, 1903; Pieris thysa ab. macularia Aurivillius, 1910; Pieris thysa var. balangensis ab. tassamagangae Neustetter, 1916; Belenois thysa thysa ab. reducta Dufrane, 1947; Belenois thysa thysa ab. blariauxi Dufrane, 1947; Belenois thysa f. rosmaria Stoneham, 1957; Belenois thysa f. agatha Stoneham, 1957; Belenois thysa f. arethusa Stoneham, 1957; Belenois thysa f. calliope Stoneham, 1957; Belenois thysa f. vansoni Pennington, 1978; Belenois meldolae Butler, 1872; Belenois thysa malaria f. angustimargo Talbot, 1943; Belenois thysa f. alegona Stoneham, 1957; Belenois thysa f. biton Stoneham, 1957; Belenois thysa f. cleobis Stoneham, 1957; Pieris thysa f. tricolor Ungemach, 1932

= Belenois thysa =

False dotted border

Species of butterfly

Belenois thysa, the false dotted border, is a butterfly of the family Pieridae. It is found in Africa.

The wingspan is 45–60 millimetres (1.8–2.4 in) for males and 48–62 mm (1.9–2.4 in) for females. Adults are on wing year-round in warm areas.

The larvae feed on Capparis species and Maerua racemulosa.

== Subspecies ==
- Belenois thysa thysa (South Africa, Mozambique, Zimbabwe, Zambia, Malawi, Tanzania and the coast of Kenya)
- Belenois thysa tricolor Talbot, 1943 (Ethiopia)
- Belenois thysa meldolae Butler, 1872 (Angola, southern Zaire to Uganda, western Kenya, southern Sudan)
