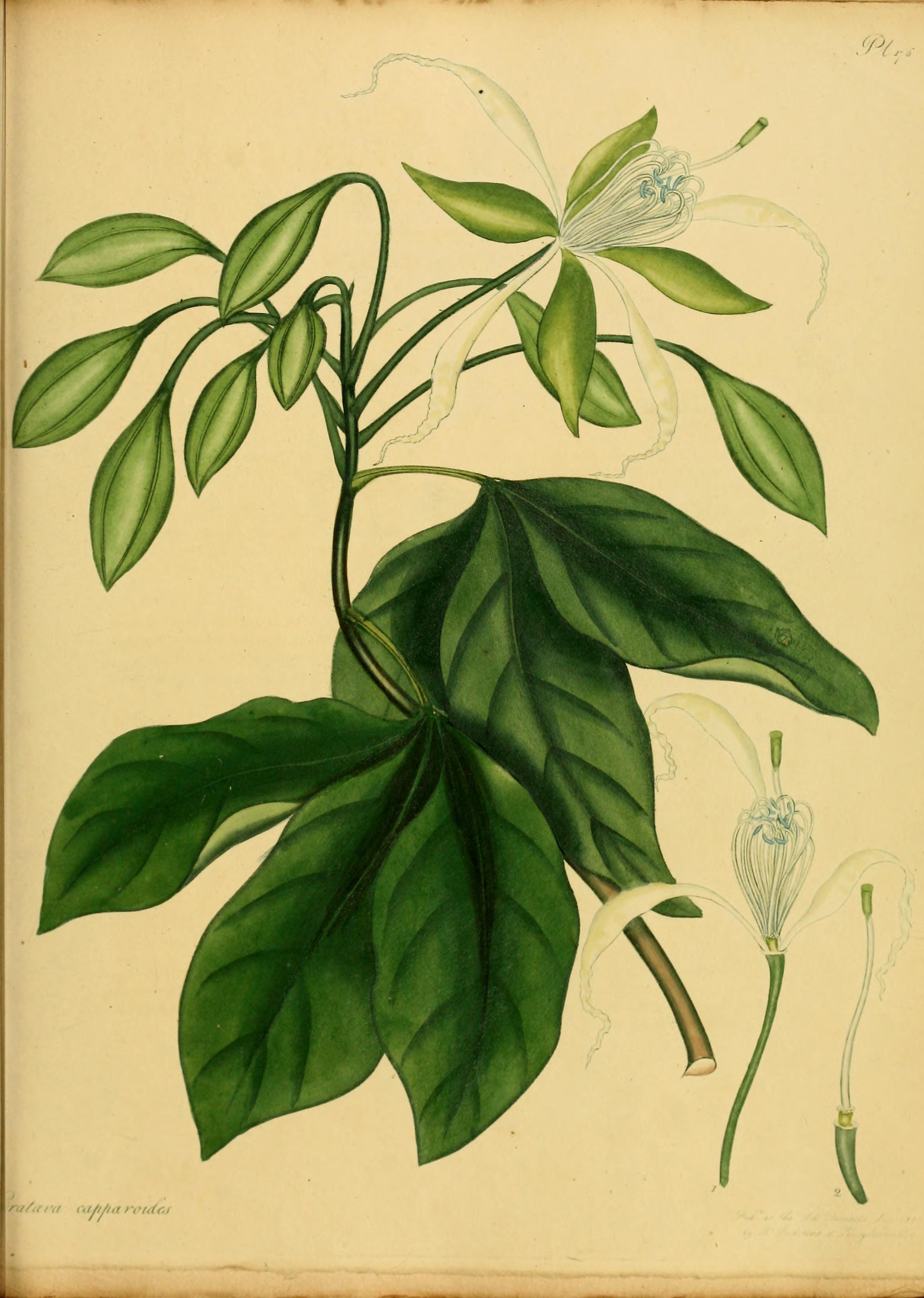
- The botanist's repository, for new, and rare plants - containing coloured figures of such plants, as have not hitherto appeared in any similar publication, with all their essential characters,

Scientific classification
- Kingdom: Plantae
- Clade: Tracheophytes
- Clade: Angiosperms
- Clade: Eudicots
- Clade: Rosids
- Order: Brassicales
- Family: Capparaceae
- Genus: Ritchiea; R.Br. ex G.Don

Synonyms
- Richiea G.Don

= Ritchiea =

Genus of plants

Ritchiea is a genus of flowering plants belonging to the family Capparaceae.

Its native range is Tropical Africa. It is found in Angola, Benin, Burkina, Burundi, Cabinda Province, Cameroon, Central African Republic, Congo, Equatorial Guinea, Ethiopia, Gabon, Gambia, Ghana, Guinea, Guinea-Bissau, Gulf of Guinea Island, Ivory Coast, Kenya, Liberia, Mozambique, Nigeria, Rwanda, Senegal, Sierra Leone, Sudan, Tanzania, Togo, Uganda, Zambia, Zaïre and Zimbabwe.

The genus name of Ritchiea is in honour of Joseph Ritchie (c. 1788 – 1819), an English surgeon, explorer and naturalist. It was first described and published in Gen. Hist. Vol.1 on page 276 in 1831.

== Known species ==
According to Kew:

- Ritchiea afzelii Gilg
- Ritchiea agelaeifolia Gilg
- Ritchiea albersii Gilg
- Ritchiea aprevaliana (De Wild. & T.Durand) R.Wilczek
- Ritchiea boukokoensis Tisser. & Sillans
- Ritchiea capparoides (Andrews) Britten
- Ritchiea carrissoi Exell & Mendonça
- Ritchiea erecta Hook.f.
- Ritchiea gossweileri Exell & Mendonça
- Ritchiea jansii R.Wilczek
- Ritchiea littoralis R.Wilczek
- Ritchiea macrantha Pax & Gilg
- Ritchiea mayumbensis Exell
- Ritchiea noldeae Exell & Mendonça
- Ritchiea ovata R.Wilczek
- Ritchiea pygmaea (Gilg) DeWolf
- Ritchiea quarrei R.Wilczek
- Ritchiea reflexa (Thonn. & Schumach.) Gilg & Gilg-Ben.
- Ritchiea simplicifolia Oliv.
- Ritchiea spragueana Gilg & Gilg-Ben.
- Ritchiea wilczekiana Bamps
- Ritchiea wittei R.Wilczek
- Ritchiea youngii Exell
