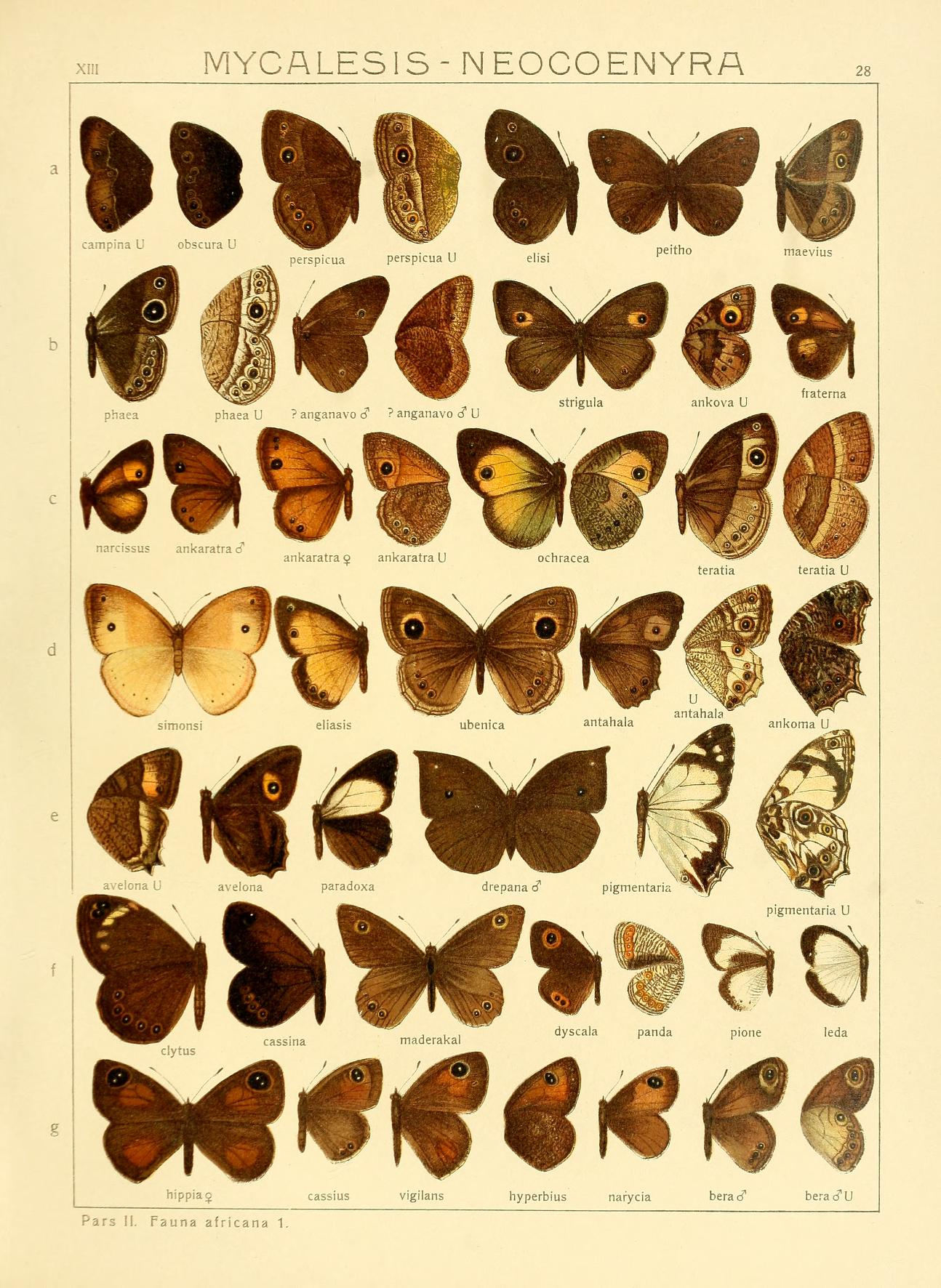
- In Adalbert Seitz's Fauna Africana

Scientific classification
- Kingdom: Animalia
- Phylum: Arthropoda
- Clade: Pancrustacea
- Class: Insecta
- Order: Lepidoptera
- Family: Nymphalidae
- Genus: Heteropsis
- Species: H. avelona

Binomial name
- Heteropsis avelona (Ward, 1870)

Synonyms
- Mycalesis avelona Ward, 1870; Henotesia avelona; Culapa oxypteron Oberthür, 1916

= Heteropsis avelona =

Species of butterfly

Heteropsis avelona is a butterfly in the family Nymphalidae. It is found on Madagascar. The habitat consists of forests.
