= Heteropsis nigrescens =

Scientific classification
- Kingdom: Animalia
- Phylum: Arthropoda
- Clade: Pancrustacea
- Class: Insecta
- Order: Lepidoptera
- Family: Nymphalidae
- Genus: Heteropsis
- Species: H. nigrescens

Binomial name
- Heteropsis nigrescens (Bethune-Baker, 1908)

Synonyms
- Henotesia nigrescens Bethune-Baker, 1908; Henotesia nigrescens striata Libert, 2006

Species of butterfly

Heteropsis nigrescens is a butterfly in the family Nymphalidae. It is found in Cameroon and the Democratic Republic of the Congo.

H. nigrescens Baker is evidently nearly allied to the preceding species [ Heteropsis peitho] and is described as follows: Male : Both wings deep velvety blackish brown, with small ocellated spots. Primaries [anterior wings] with two small subapical intense black spots minutely but distinctly pupilled with white and having red irides which touch each other; a larger similar spot near the termen between veins 2 and 3; secondaries posterior wings with a similar spot as in the primaries between veins 2 and 3, near the termen, with occasionally a trace of another similar one above it.Underside: both wings tawny ochreous, closely suffused with fine, deep, rusty, vein-like, wavy lines, terminating to a large extent in the postmedian area by a prominent deep rusty line through both wings with a broad greyish subterminal area in which the white-pupilled black spots show through, the upper two having a single ochreous iris, the lower one with a very broad ochreous iris with a dark outer edging: secondaries with a rusty median transverse line and a curved series of seven or eight ocellated spots as in the forewings. Expanse 46 mm. Hab. Makala, May and June 1906.

== Subspecies ==
- Heteropsis nigrescens nigrescens (Democratic Republic of the Congo)
- Heteropsis nigrescens striata (Libert, 2006) (Cameroon)
