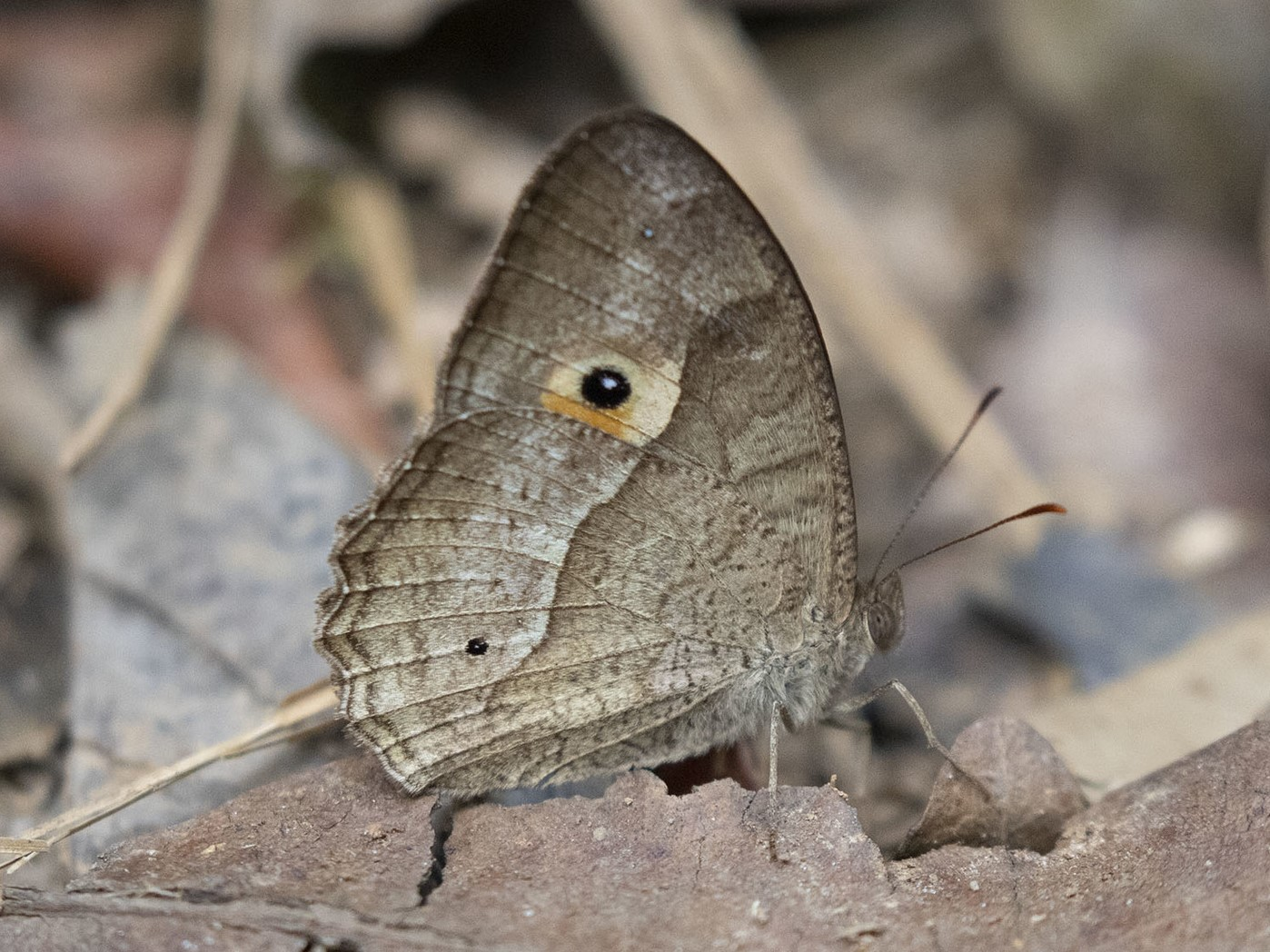

Scientific classification
- Kingdom: Animalia
- Phylum: Arthropoda
- Clade: Pancrustacea
- Class: Insecta
- Order: Lepidoptera
- Family: Nymphalidae
- Genus: Heteropsis
- Species: H. iboina

Binomial name
- Heteropsis iboina (Ward, 1870)

Synonyms
- Mycalesis iboina Ward, 1870; Henotesia iboina (Ward, 1870)

= Heteropsis iboina =

Species of butterfly

Heteropsis iboina is a species of butterfly in the family Nymphalidae. It is found on Madagascar. The habitat consists of forests and forest margins.
