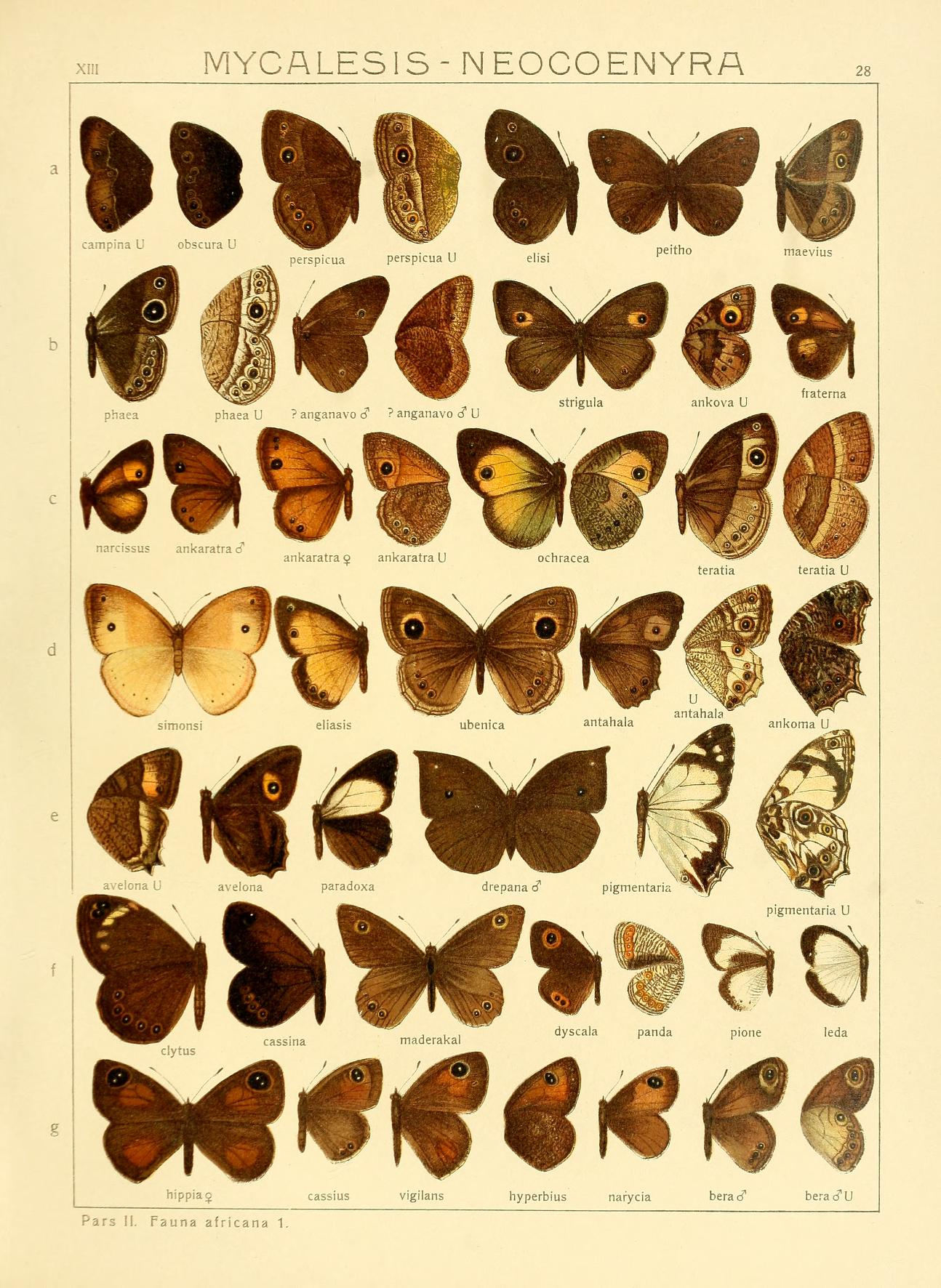
- In Adalbert Seitz's Fauna Africana

Scientific classification
- Kingdom: Animalia
- Phylum: Arthropoda
- Clade: Pancrustacea
- Class: Insecta
- Order: Lepidoptera
- Family: Nymphalidae
- Genus: Heteropsis
- Species: H. anganavo

Binomial name
- Heteropsis anganavo (Ward, 1871)

Synonyms
- Mycalesis anganavo Ward, 1871; Henotesia anganavo; Houlbertia anganavo; Heteropsis (Henotesia) anganavo; Mycalesis perdita Butler, 1878; Henotesia wardii Butler, 1879; Mycalesis cingulina Mabille, 1880; Henotesia andravahana ab. marmorata Aurivillius, 1911

= Heteropsis anganavo =

Species of butterfly

Heteropsis anganavo is a butterfly in the family Nymphalidae. It is found on Madagascar. The habitat consists of forests.
