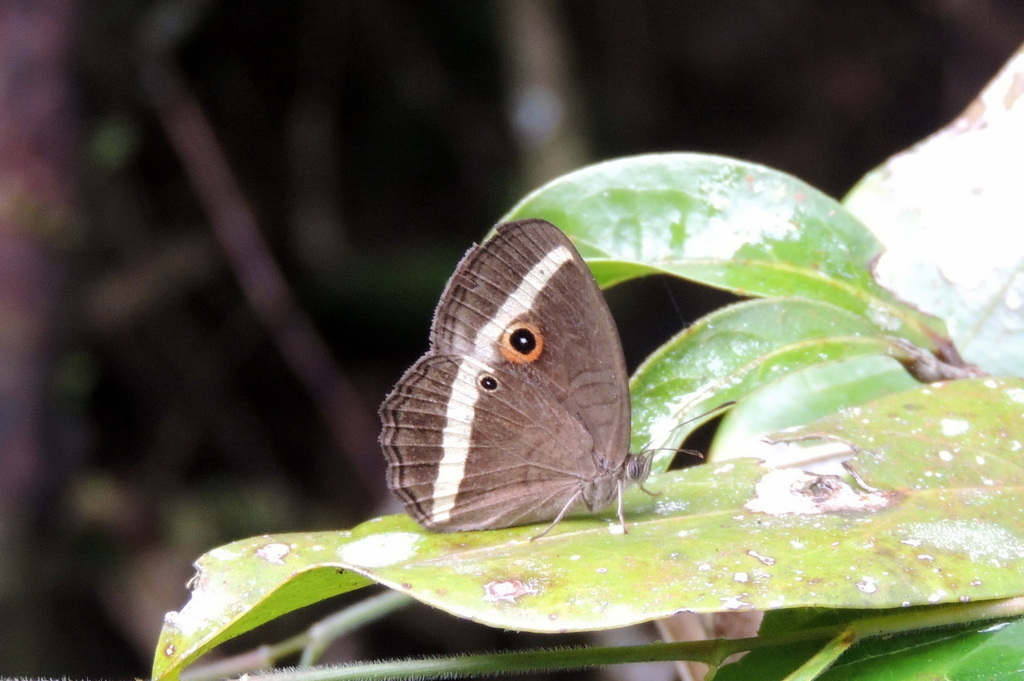

Scientific classification
- Kingdom: Animalia
- Phylum: Arthropoda
- Clade: Pancrustacea
- Class: Insecta
- Order: Lepidoptera
- Family: Nymphalidae
- Genus: Heteropsis
- Species: H. vola

Binomial name
- Heteropsis vola (Ward, 1870)

Synonyms
- Heteropsis (Telinga) vola

= Heteropsis vola =

Species of butterfly

Heteropsis vola is a butterfly in the family Nymphalidae. It is found on Madagascar. The habitat consists of forests.
