= Heteropsis passandava =

Scientific classification
- Kingdom: Animalia
- Phylum: Arthropoda
- Clade: Pancrustacea
- Class: Insecta
- Order: Lepidoptera
- Family: Nymphalidae
- Genus: Heteropsis
- Species: H. passandava

Binomial name
- Heteropsis passandava (Ward, 1871)

Synonyms
- Erebia passandava Ward, 1871; Heteropsis (Henotesia) passandava; Culapa iboina var. fitensis Oberthür, 1916; Mycalesis andrivola Mabille, 1877; Mycalesis masikora Mabille, 1877

Species of butterfly

Heteropsis passandava is a butterfly in the family Nymphalidae. It is found on Madagascar. The habitat consists of forests.
