= Heteropsis antahala =

Scientific classification
- Kingdom: Animalia
- Phylum: Arthropoda
- Clade: Pancrustacea
- Class: Insecta
- Order: Lepidoptera
- Family: Nymphalidae
- Genus: Heteropsis
- Species: H. antahala

Binomial name
- Heteropsis antahala (Ward, 1872)

Synonyms
- Mycalesis antahala Ward, 1872; Masoura antahala; Heteropsis (Masoura) antahala; Mycalesis benacus Mabille, 1884

Species of butterfly

Heteropsis antahala is a butterfly in the family Nymphalidae. It is found on Madagascar. The habitat consists of forest margins.
