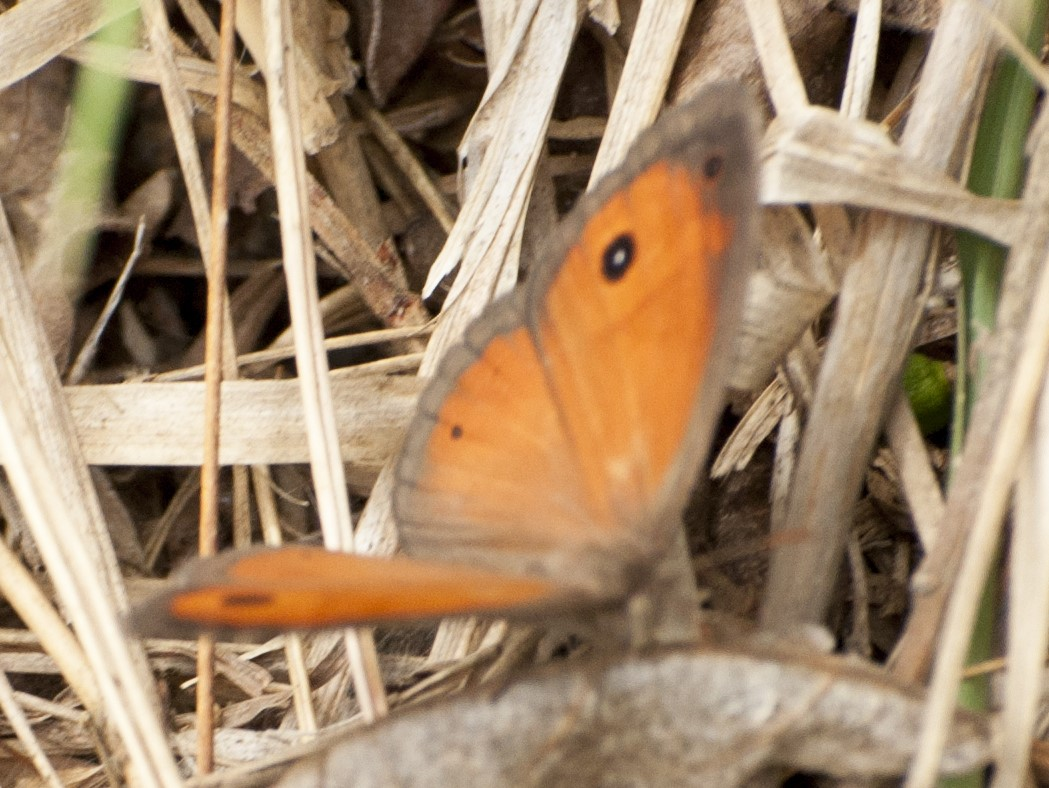

Scientific classification
- Kingdom: Animalia
- Phylum: Arthropoda
- Clade: Pancrustacea
- Class: Insecta
- Order: Lepidoptera
- Family: Nymphalidae
- Genus: Heteropsis
- Species: H. ankaratra

Binomial name
- Heteropsis ankaratra (Ward, 1870)

Synonyms
- Erebia ankaratra Ward, 1870; Henotesia ankaratra; Yphthima sakalava Saalmüller, 1878; Yphthima loucoubensis Saalmüller, 1878

= Heteropsis ankaratra =

Species of butterfly

Heteropsis ankaratra is a butterfly in the family Nymphalidae. It is found on Madagascar. The habitat consists of unnatural grassland.
