= Heteropsis erebennis =

Scientific classification
- Kingdom: Animalia
- Phylum: Arthropoda
- Clade: Pancrustacea
- Class: Insecta
- Order: Lepidoptera
- Family: Nymphalidae
- Genus: Heteropsis
- Species: H. erebennis

Binomial name
- Heteropsis erebennis (Oberthür, 1916)

Synonyms
- Houlbertia erebennis Oberthür, 1916; Heteropsis (Henotesia) erebennis

Species of butterfly

Heteropsis erebennis is a butterfly in the family Nymphalidae. It is found on Madagascar. The habitat consists of forests.
