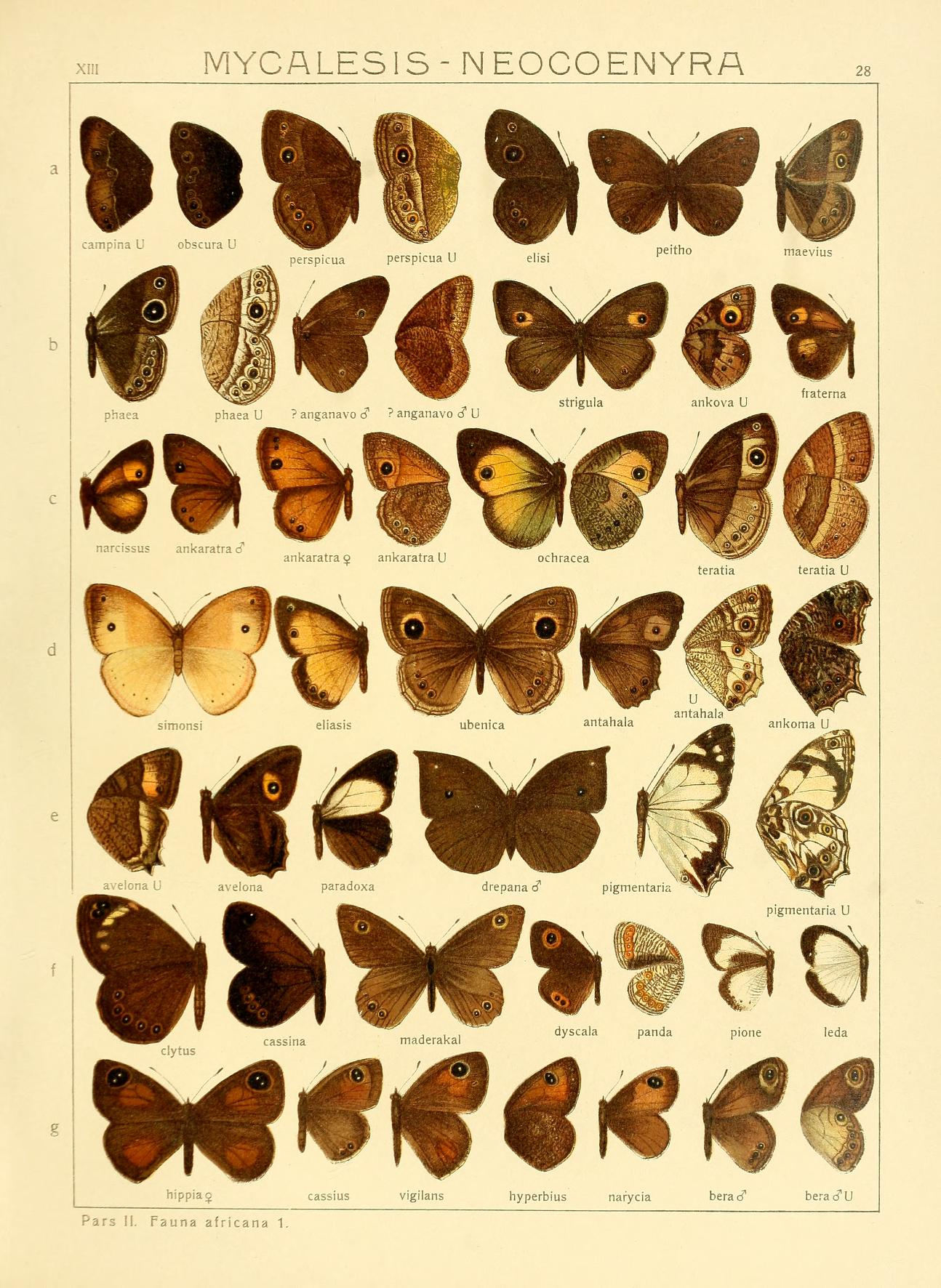
- In Adalbert Seitz's Fauna Africana

Scientific classification
- Kingdom: Animalia
- Phylum: Arthropoda
- Clade: Pancrustacea
- Class: Insecta
- Order: Lepidoptera
- Family: Nymphalidae
- Genus: Heteropsis
- Species: H. ankoma

Binomial name
- Heteropsis ankoma (Mabille, 1878)

Synonyms
- Mycalesis ankoma Mabille, 1878; Masoura ankoma; Heteropsis (Masoura) ankoma

= Heteropsis ankoma =

Species of butterfly

Heteropsis ankoma is a butterfly in the family Nymphalidae. It is found on Madagascar. The habitat consists of forests.
