= Heteropsis mabillei =

Scientific classification
- Kingdom: Animalia
- Phylum: Arthropoda
- Clade: Pancrustacea
- Class: Insecta
- Order: Lepidoptera
- Family: Nymphalidae
- Genus: Heteropsis
- Species: H. mabillei

Binomial name
- Heteropsis mabillei (Butler, 1879)

Synonyms
- Strabena mabillei Butler, 1879 (not Aurivillius, 1899); Heteropsis (Masoura) mabillei

Species of butterfly

Heteropsis mabillei is a butterfly in the family Nymphalidae. It is found on Madagascar.
