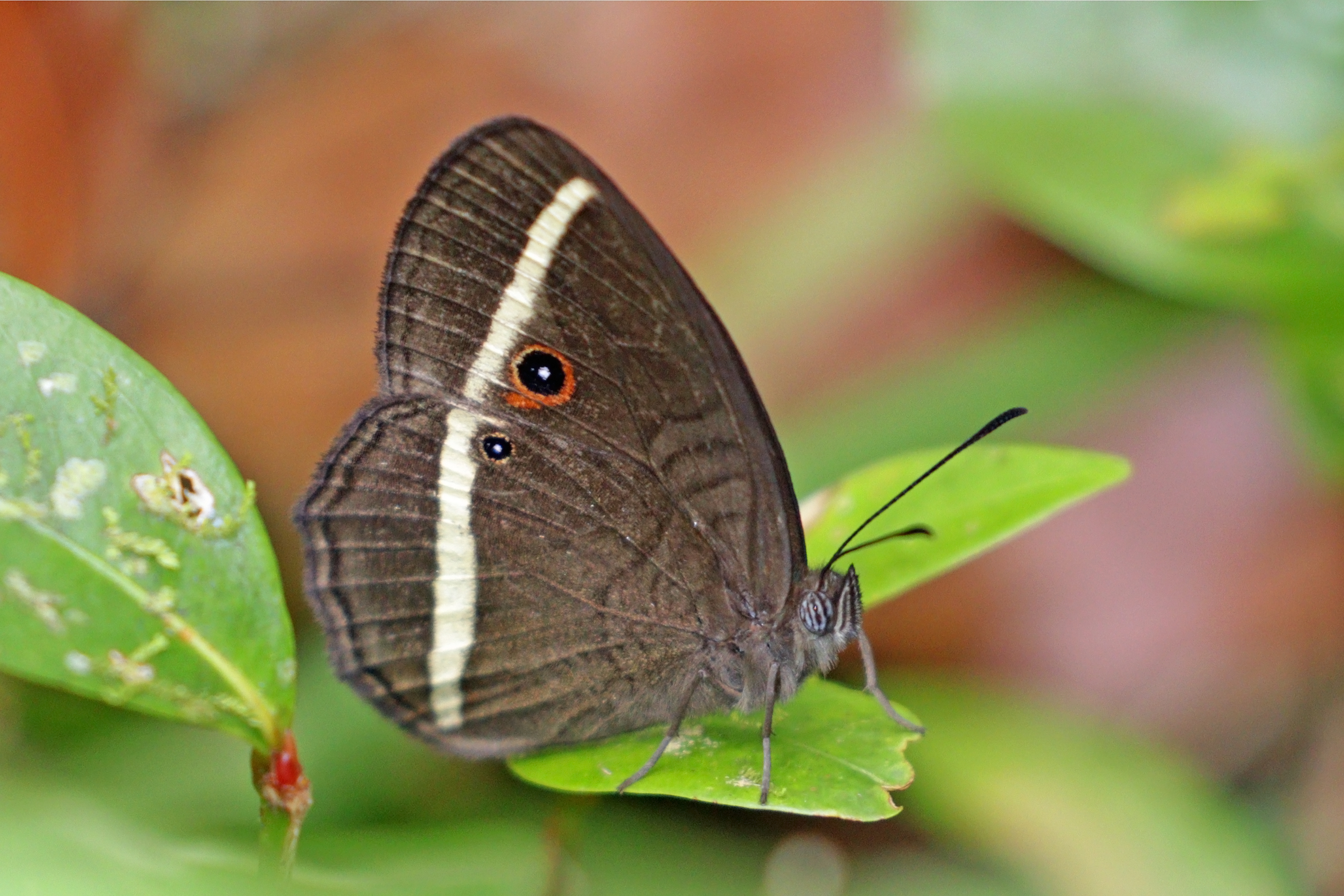
- H. vola, Madagascar

Scientific classification
- Domain: Eukaryota
- Kingdom: Animalia
- Phylum: Arthropoda
- Class: Insecta
- Order: Lepidoptera
- Family: Nymphalidae
- Subfamily: Satyrinae
- Tribe: Elymniini
- Subtribe: Mycalesina
- Genus: Heteropsis; Westwood, 1850

Type species
- Heteropsis drepana Westwood, 1850

Diversity
- About 60 species

Synonyms
- Henotesia Butler, 1879; Houlbertia Oberthür, 1916; Masoura Hemming, 1964; Smithia Mabille, [1880]; Gallienia Oberthür, 1916; Admiratio Hemming, 1964

= Heteropsis (butterfly) =

Genus of butterflies

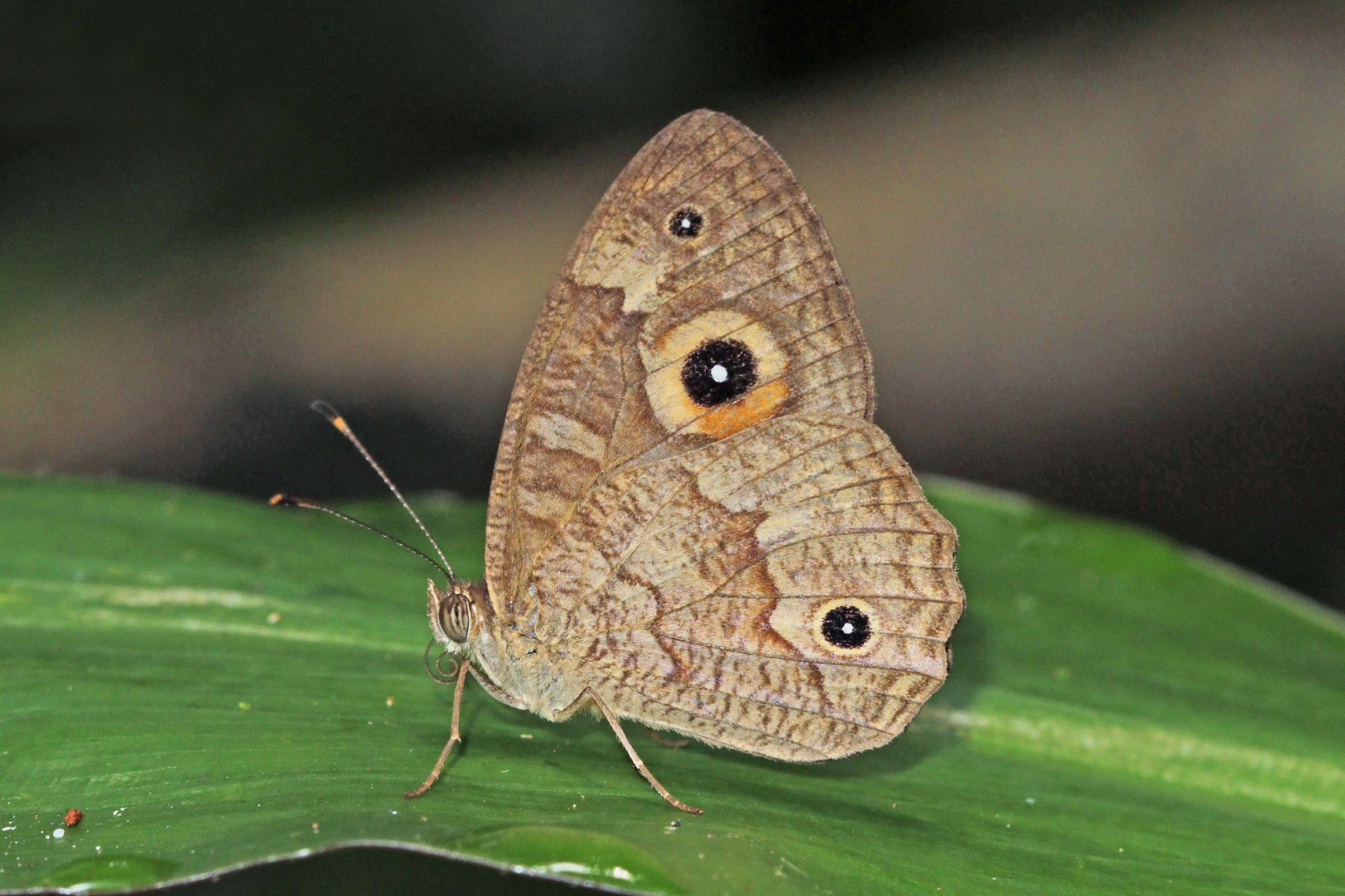
male H. avaratra

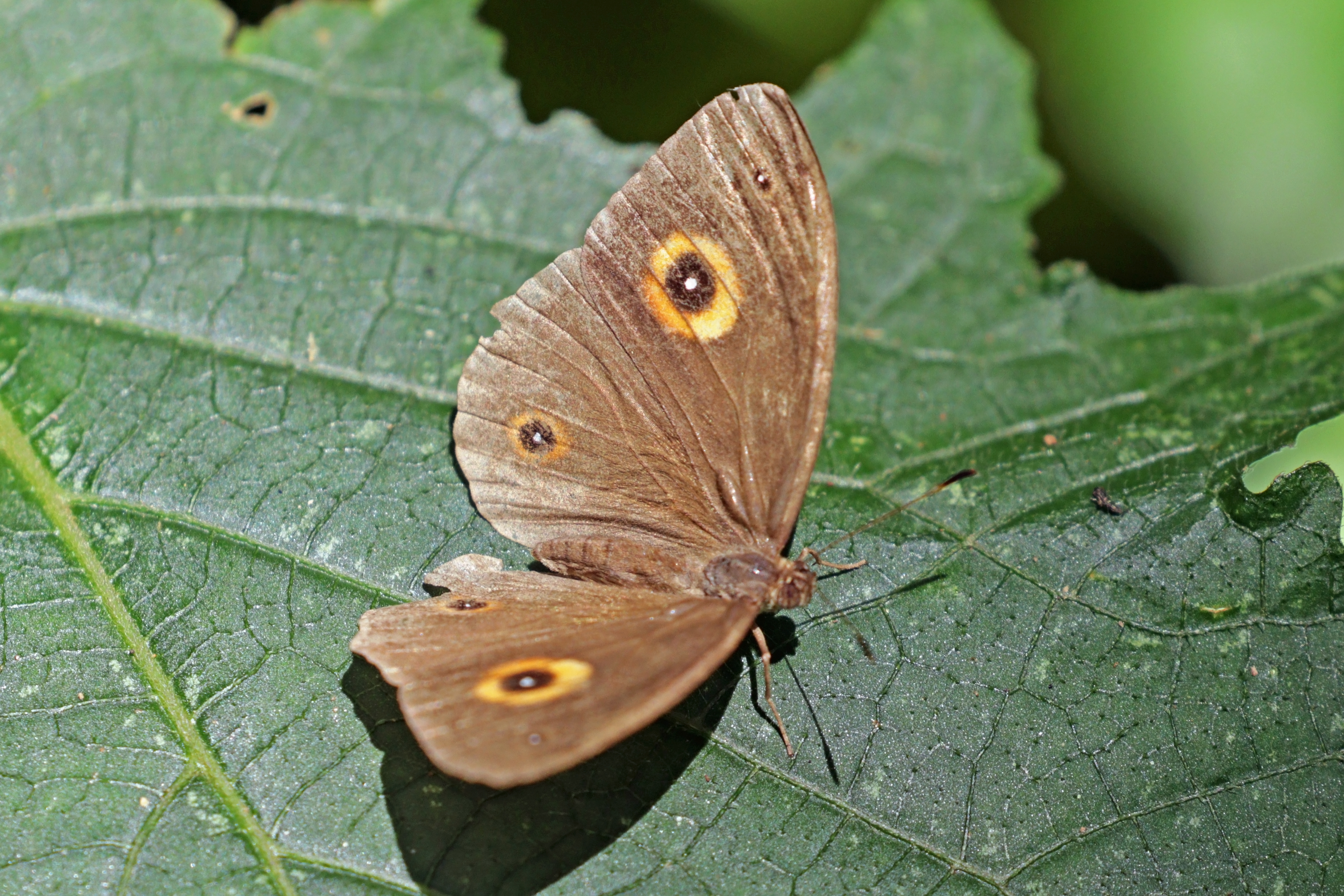
female H. avaratra

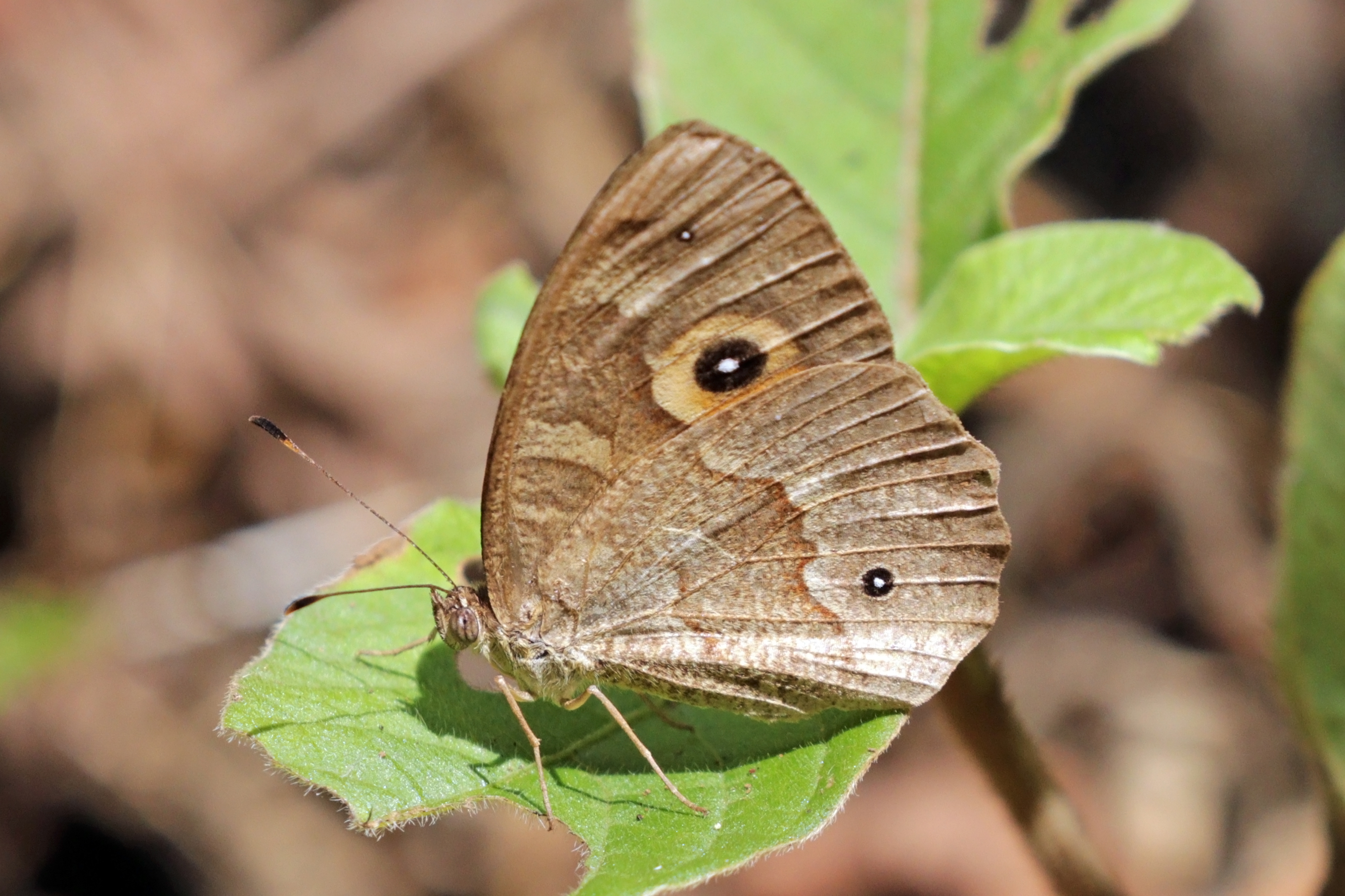
female H. avaratra

Heteropsis is an Afrotropical butterfly genus from the subfamily Satyrinae in the family Nymphalidae.

== Species ==
- Heteropsis adolphei (Guérin-Méneville, 1843)
- Heteropsis alaokola (Oberthür, 1916)
- Heteropsis anceps (Oberthür, 1916)
- Heteropsis andasibe Lees, 2003
- Heteropsis andravahana (Mabille, 1878)
- Heteropsis anganavo (Ward, 1871)
- Heteropsis angolensis Kielland, 1994
- Heteropsis angulifascia (Butler, 1879)
- Heteropsis ankaratra (Ward, 1870)
- Heteropsis ankoma (Mabille, 1878)
- Heteropsis ankova (Ward, 1870)
- Heteropsis antahala (Ward, 1872)
- Heteropsis avaratra Lees & Kremen, 2016
- Heteropsis avelona (Ward, 1870)
- Heteropsis bicristata (Mabille, 1878)
- Heteropsis centralis Aurivillius, 1903
- Heteropsis comorana (Oberthür, 1916)
- Heteropsis cowani (Butler, 1880)
- Heteropsis decira (Plötz, 1880)
- Heteropsis difficilis (Mabille, 1880)
- Heteropsis drepana Westwood, 1850
- Heteropsis eliasis (Hewitson, [1866])
- Heteropsis elisi (Karsch, 1893)
- Heteropsis erebennis (Oberthür, 1916)
- Heteropsis erebina (Oberthür, 1916)
- Heteropsis exocellata (Mabille, [1880])
- Heteropsis fuliginosa (Mabille, 1878)
- Heteropsis iboina (Ward, 1870)
- Heteropsis laeta (Oberthür, 1916)
- Heteropsis laetifica (Oberthür, 1916)
- Heteropsis mabillei (Butler, 1879)
- Heteropsis maeva (Mabille, 1878)
- Heteropsis masoura (Hewitson, 1875)
- Heteropsis narcissus (Fabricius, 1798)
- Heteropsis narova (Mabille, 1877)
- Heteropsis nigrescens (Bethune-Baker, 1908)
- Heteropsis obscura (Oberthür, 1916)
- Heteropsis ochracea Lathy, 1906
- Heteropsis pallida (Oberthür, 1916)
- Heteropsis paradoxa (Mabille, [1880])
- Heteropsis parva (Butler, 1879)
- Heteropsis parvidens (Mabille, 1880)
- Heteropsis passandava (Ward, 1871)
- Heteropsis pauper (Oberthür, 1916)
- Heteropsis peitho (Plötz, 1880)
- Heteropsis perspicua (Trimen, 1873)
- Heteropsis phaea Karsch, 1890
- Heteropsis sabas (Oberthür, 1923)
- Heteropsis simonsii (Butler, 1877)
- Heteropsis strato (Mabille, 1878)
- Heteropsis strigula (Mabille, 1877)
- Heteropsis subsimilis (Butler, 1879)
- Heteropsis teratia (Karsch, 1894)
- Heteropsis turbans (Oberthür, 1916)
- Heteropsis turbata (Butler, 1880)
- Heteropsis ubenica Thurau, 1903
- Heteropsis undulans (Oberthür, 1916)
- Heteropsis uniformis (Oberthür, 1916)
- Heteropsis viettei Lees, 2003
- Heteropsis vola (Ward, 1870)
- Heteropsis wardii (Mabille, 1877)
