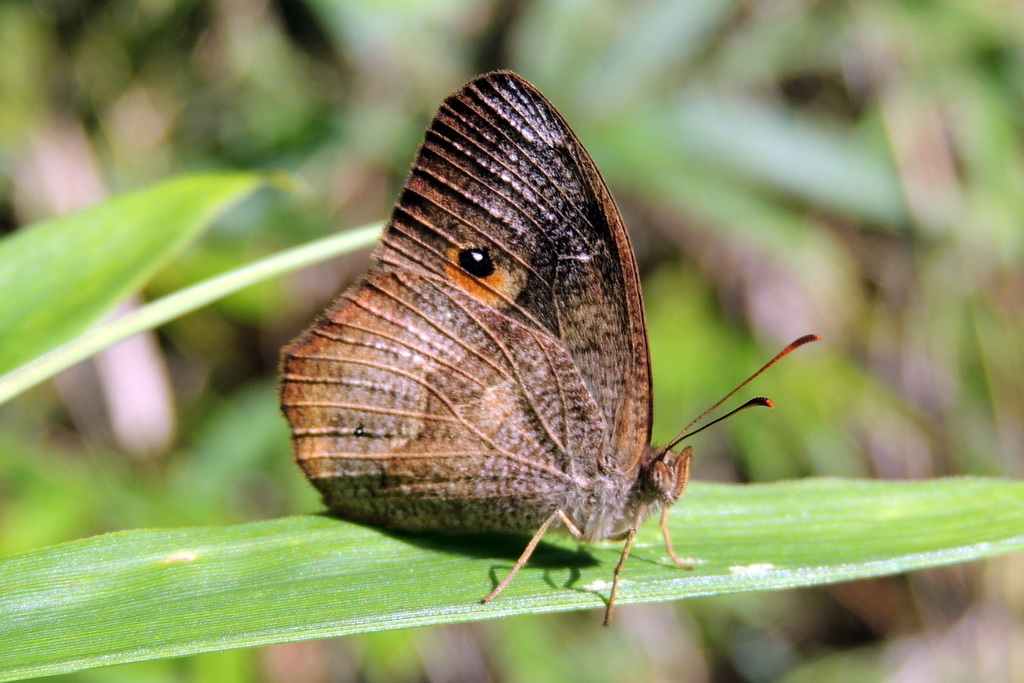

Scientific classification
- Kingdom: Animalia
- Phylum: Arthropoda
- Clade: Pancrustacea
- Class: Insecta
- Order: Lepidoptera
- Family: Nymphalidae
- Genus: Heteropsis
- Species: H. parva

Binomial name
- Heteropsis parva (Butler, 1879)

Synonyms
- Culapa parva Butler, 1879; Henotesia parva; Mycalesis irrorata Mabille, 1880

= Heteropsis parva =

Species of butterfly

Heteropsis parva is a butterfly in the family Nymphalidae. It is found on Madagascar. The habitat consists of forests.
