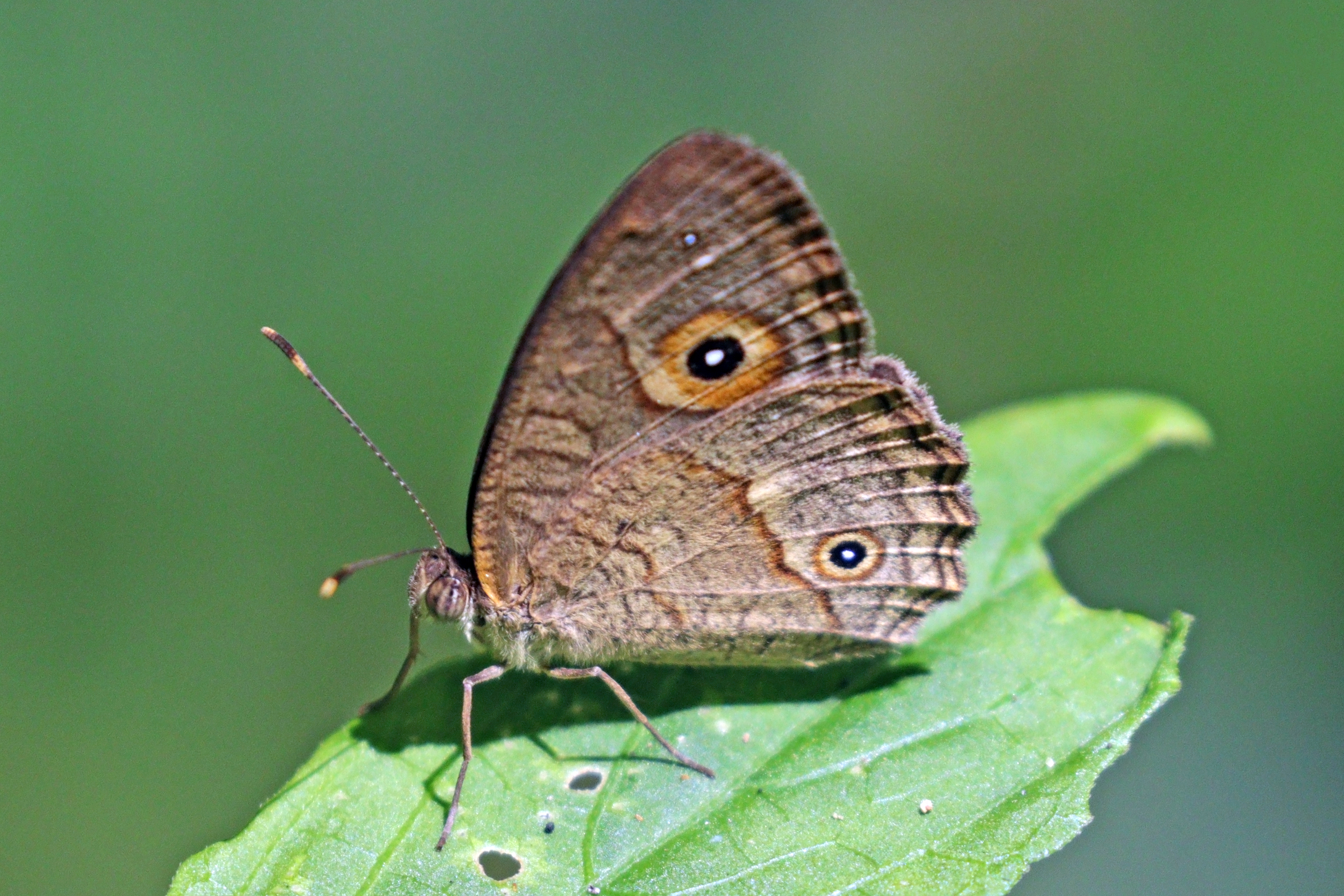
- male, Andasibe-Mantadia National Park, Madagascar

Scientific classification
- Kingdom: Animalia
- Phylum: Arthropoda
- Clade: Pancrustacea
- Class: Insecta
- Order: Lepidoptera
- Family: Nymphalidae
- Genus: Heteropsis
- Species: H. pauper

Binomial name
- Heteropsis pauper (Oberthür, 1916)

Synonyms
- Culapa pauper Oberthür, 1916; Henotesia pauper; Culapa pauper var. pseudonarcissus Oberthür, 1916

= Heteropsis pauper =

Species of butterfly

Heteropsis pauper is a butterfly in the family Nymphalidae. It is found on Madagascar. The habitat consists of forests.
