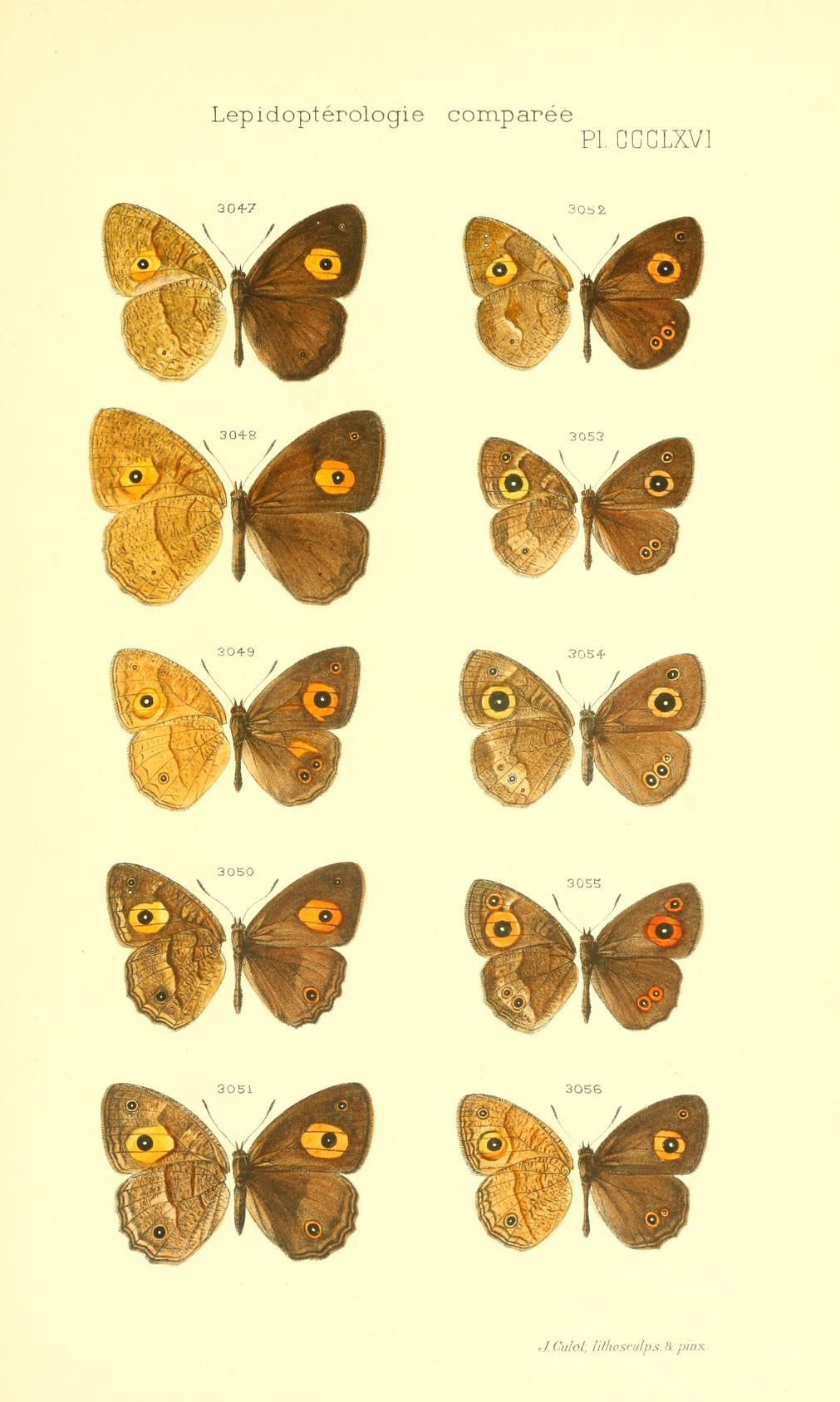
- Figure 3055 (male) in Charles Oberthür's 1916 Lepidopterologie Comparie

Scientific classification
- Kingdom: Animalia
- Phylum: Arthropoda
- Clade: Pancrustacea
- Class: Insecta
- Order: Lepidoptera
- Family: Nymphalidae
- Genus: Heteropsis
- Species: H. turbata

Binomial name
- Heteropsis turbata (Butler, 1880)

Synonyms
- Pseudonympha turbata Butler, 1880; Henotesia turbata; Culapa ornata Oberthür, 1916

= Heteropsis turbata =

Species of butterfly

Heteropsis turbata is a butterfly in the family Nymphalidae. It is found on Madagascar. The habitat consists of natural grasslands.
