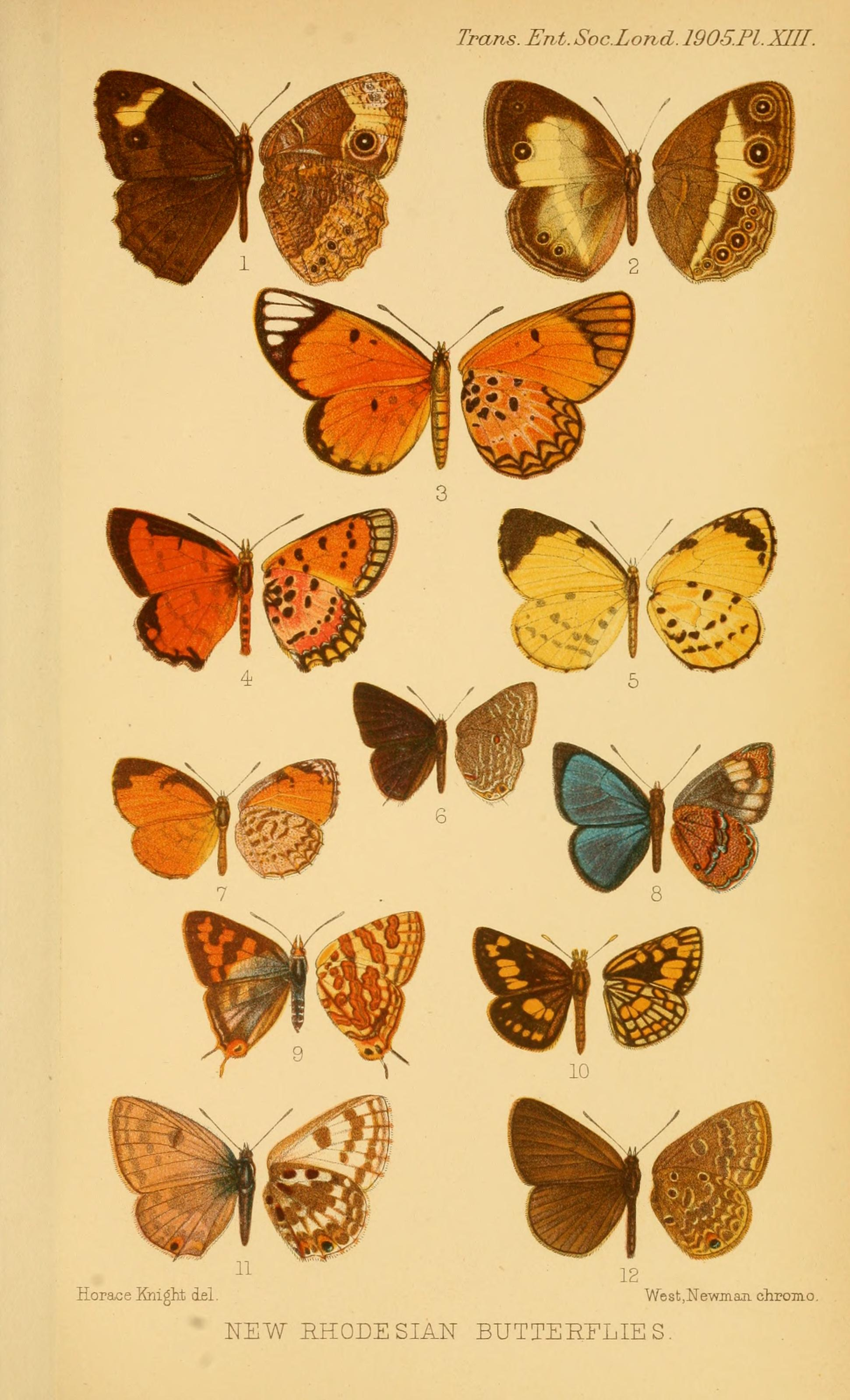
- Figure 2

Scientific classification
- Kingdom: Animalia
- Phylum: Arthropoda
- Clade: Pancrustacea
- Class: Insecta
- Order: Lepidoptera
- Family: Nymphalidae
- Genus: Heteropsis
- Species: H. centralis

Binomial name
- Heteropsis centralis (Aurivillius, 1903)

Synonyms
- Henotesia centralis Aurivillius, 1903; Mycalesis haroldi Druce, 1905

= Heteropsis centralis =

Species of butterfly

Heteropsis centralis is a butterfly in the family Nymphalidae. It is found in the Democratic Republic of the Congo, Angola and Zambia.
