= Heteropsis exocellata =

Scientific classification
- Kingdom: Animalia
- Phylum: Arthropoda
- Clade: Pancrustacea
- Class: Insecta
- Order: Lepidoptera
- Family: Nymphalidae
- Genus: Heteropsis
- Species: H. exocellata

Binomial name
- Heteropsis exocellata (Mabille, 1880)

Synonyms
- Mycalesis exocellata Mabille, 1880; Henotesia exocellata; Culapa antsianakana Oberthür, 1916; Henotesia aberrans Paulian, 1951; Henotesia benedicta Paulian, 1951

Species of butterfly

Heteropsis exocellata is a butterfly in the family Nymphalidae. It is found on Madagascar. The habitat consists of forests.
