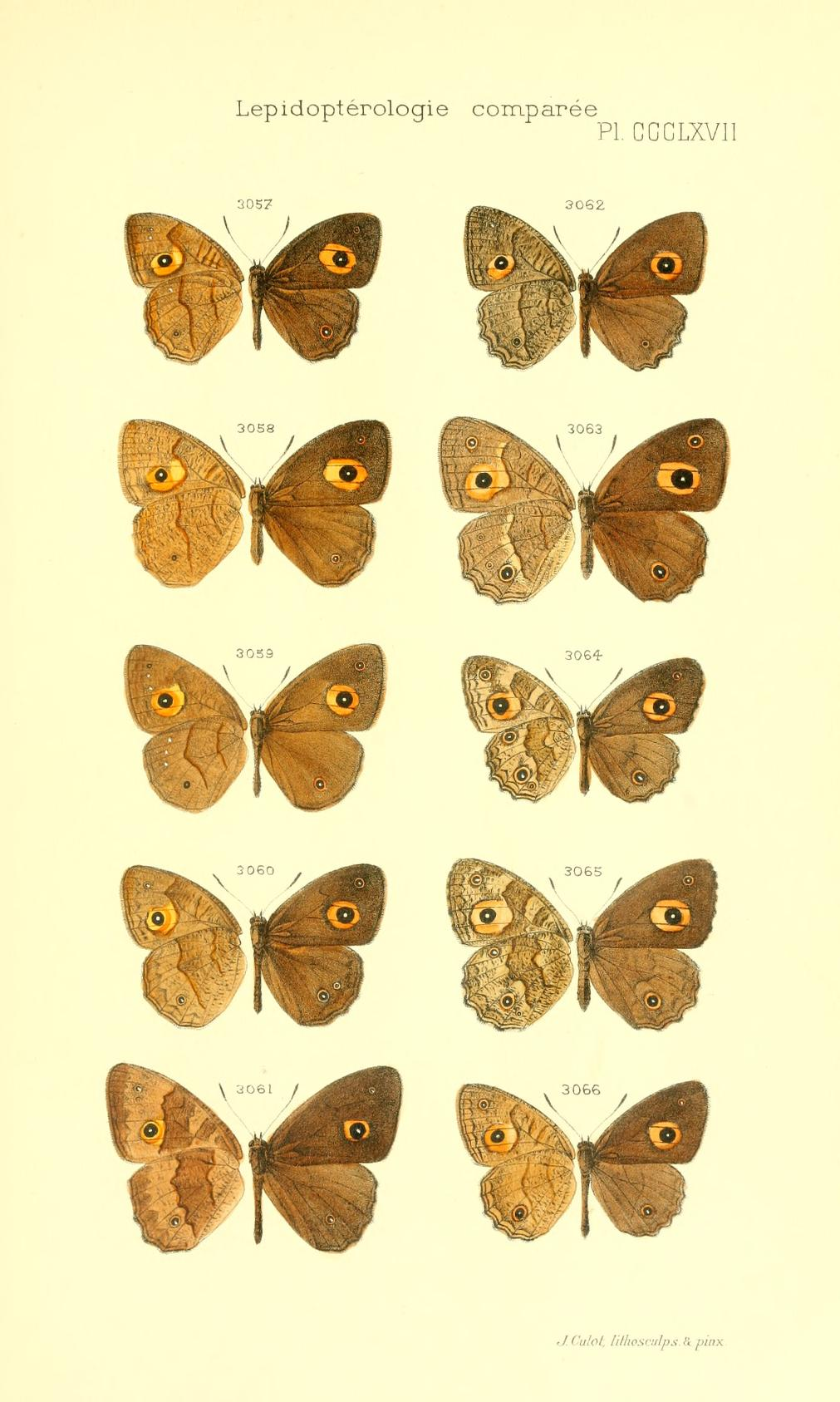
- Figures 3064 (male) and 3065 (female) in Charles Oberthür's 1916 Lepidopterologie Comparie

Scientific classification
- Kingdom: Animalia
- Phylum: Arthropoda
- Clade: Pancrustacea
- Class: Insecta
- Order: Lepidoptera
- Family: Nymphalidae
- Genus: Heteropsis
- Species: H. subsimilis

Binomial name
- Heteropsis subsimilis (Butler, 1879)

Synonyms
- Pseudonympha subsimilis Butler, 1879; Henotesia subsimilis; Culapa undulata Oberthür, 1916

= Heteropsis subsimilis =

Species of butterfly

Heteropsis subsimilis is a butterfly in the family Nymphalidae. It is found on Madagascar. The habitat consists of forests.
