= Heteropsis angolensis =

Scientific classification
- Kingdom: Animalia
- Phylum: Arthropoda
- Clade: Pancrustacea
- Class: Insecta
- Order: Lepidoptera
- Family: Nymphalidae
- Genus: Heteropsis
- Species: H. angolensis

Binomial name
- Heteropsis angolensis (Kielland, 1994)

Synonyms
- Henotesia angolensis Kielland, 1994

Species of butterfly

Heteropsis angolensis is a butterfly in the family Nymphalidae. It is found in Angola.
