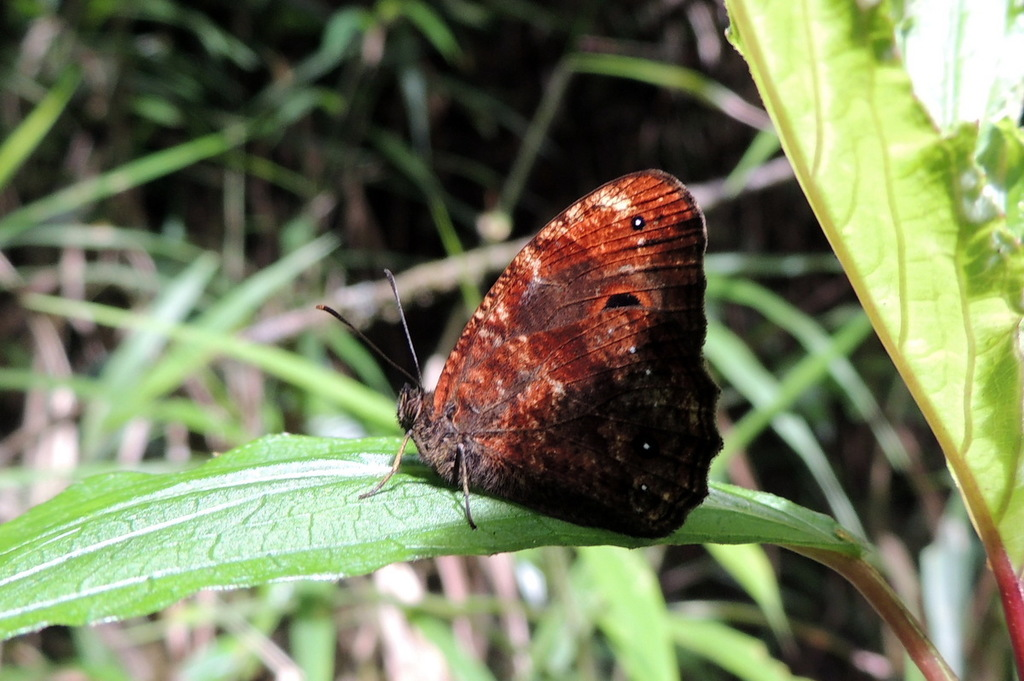

Scientific classification
- Kingdom: Animalia
- Phylum: Arthropoda
- Clade: Pancrustacea
- Class: Insecta
- Order: Lepidoptera
- Family: Nymphalidae
- Genus: Heteropsis
- Species: H. difficilis

Binomial name
- Heteropsis difficilis (Mabille, 1880)

Synonyms
- Heteropsis (Henotesia) difficilis; Mycalesis difficilis Mabille, 1880; Henotesia andravahana var. macrophthalma Oberthür, 1916; Henotesia undulosa Oberthür, 1916; Henotesia undulosa var. luctuosa Oberthür, 1916

= Heteropsis difficilis =

Species of butterfly

Heteropsis difficilis is a butterfly in the family Nymphalidae. It is found on Madagascar. The habitat consists of forests.
