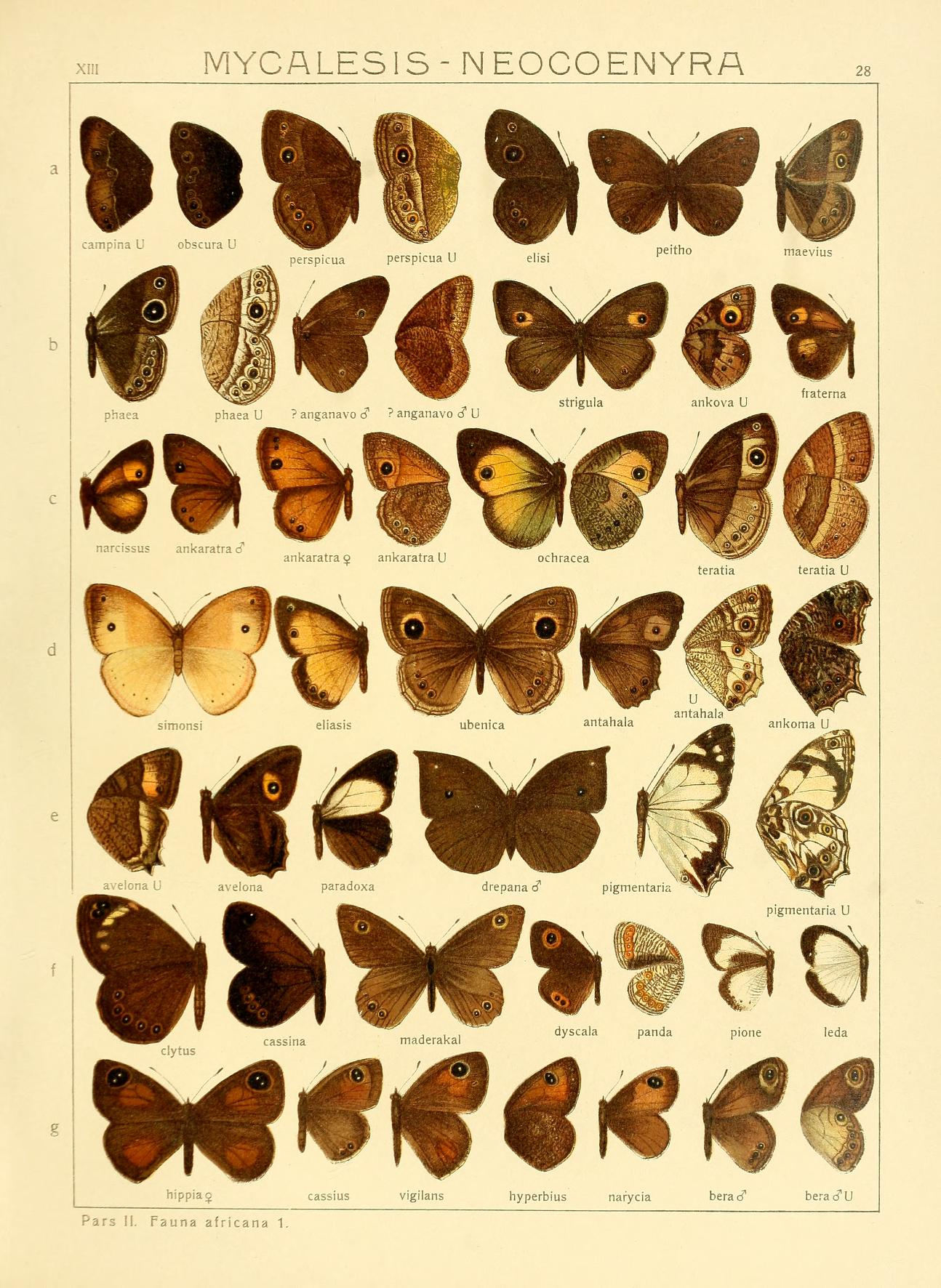
- In Adalbert Seitz's Fauna Africana

Scientific classification
- Kingdom: Animalia
- Phylum: Arthropoda
- Clade: Pancrustacea
- Class: Insecta
- Order: Lepidoptera
- Family: Nymphalidae
- Genus: Heteropsis
- Species: H. teratia

Binomial name
- Heteropsis teratia (Karsch, 1894)

Synonyms
- Mycalesis teratia Karsch, 1894; Henotesia teratia

= Heteropsis teratia =

Species of butterfly

Heteropsis teratia is a butterfly in the family Nymphalidae. It is found mainly in the Democratic Republic of the Congo, Kenya, Tanzania, Zambia and possibly Uganda.
