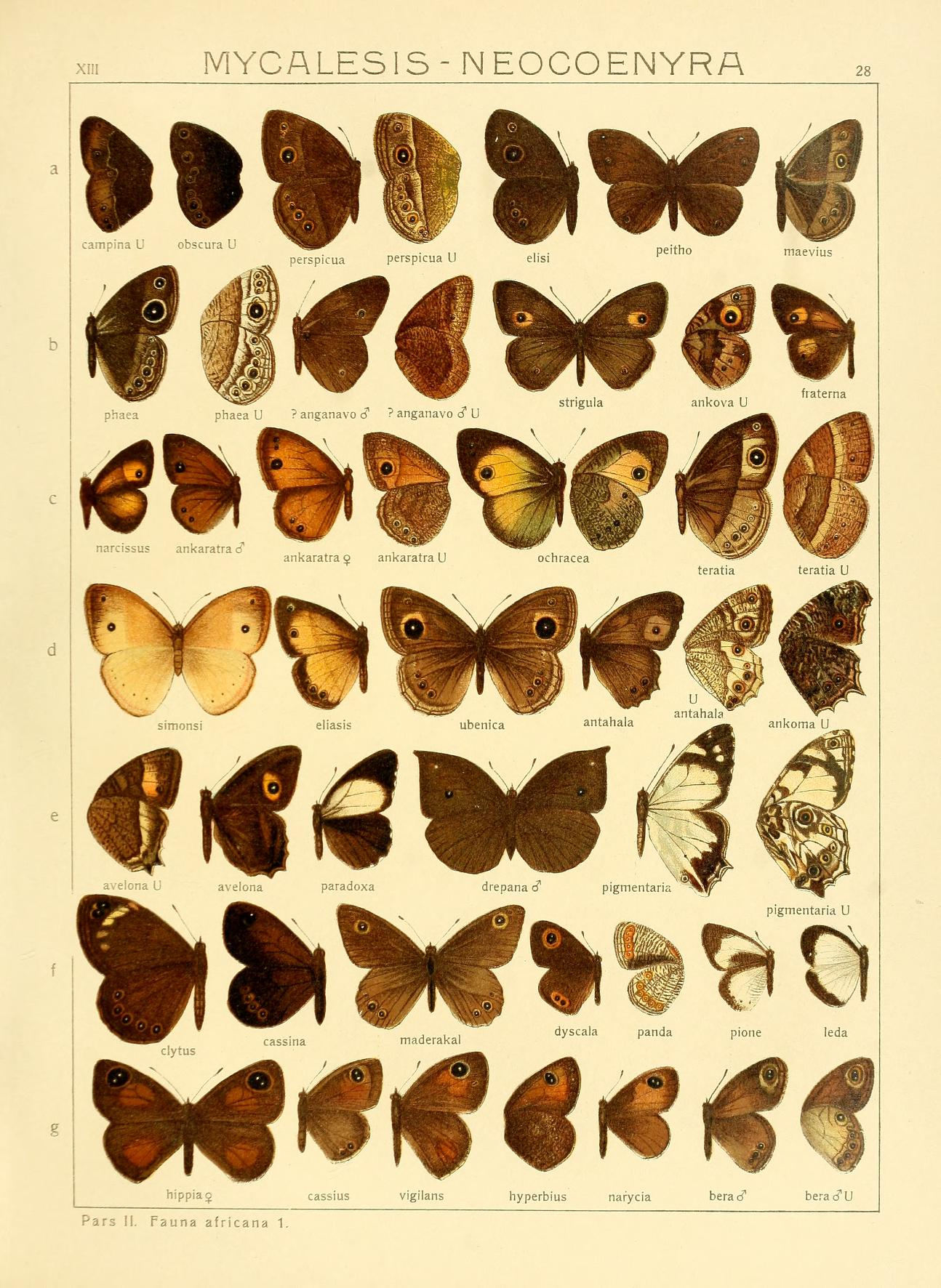
- In Adalbert Seitz's Fauna Africana

Scientific classification
- Kingdom: Animalia
- Phylum: Arthropoda
- Clade: Pancrustacea
- Class: Insecta
- Order: Lepidoptera
- Family: Nymphalidae
- Genus: Heteropsis
- Species: H. drepana

Binomial name
- Heteropsis drepana Westwood, [1850]

Synonyms
- Heteropsis (Heteropsis) drepana

= Heteropsis drepana =

Species of butterfly

Heteropsis drepana is a butterfly in the family Nymphalidae. It is found on Madagascar. The habitat consists of forests.
