= Heteropsis uniformis =

Scientific classification
- Kingdom: Animalia
- Phylum: Arthropoda
- Clade: Pancrustacea
- Class: Insecta
- Order: Lepidoptera
- Family: Nymphalidae
- Genus: Heteropsis
- Species: H. uniformis

Binomial name
- Heteropsis uniformis (Oberthür, 1916)

Synonyms
- Culapa uniformis Oberthür, 1916; Henotesia uniformis

Species of butterfly

Heteropsis uniformis is a butterfly in the family Nymphalidae. It is found on Madagascar. The habitat consists of forests.

This species is endemic to Madagascar, where it has been observed in the vicinity of Toamasina. Its habitat consists of forests.
