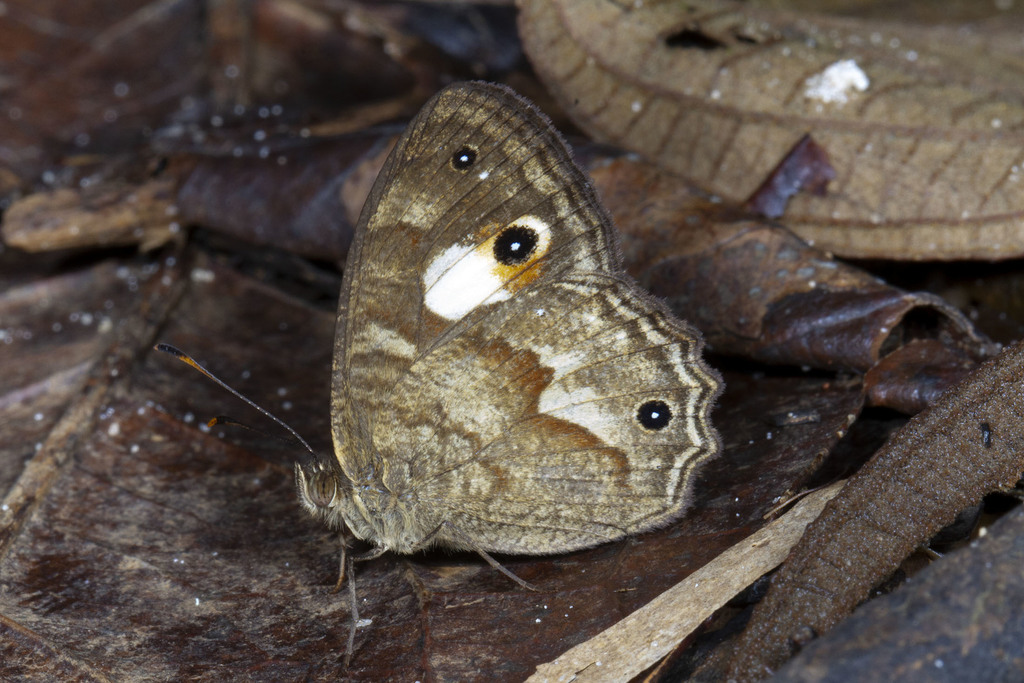

Scientific classification
- Kingdom: Animalia
- Phylum: Arthropoda
- Clade: Pancrustacea
- Class: Insecta
- Order: Lepidoptera
- Family: Nymphalidae
- Genus: Heteropsis
- Species: H. sabas

Binomial name
- Heteropsis sabas (Oberthür, 1923)

Synonyms
- Culapa sabas Oberthür, 1923; Henotesia sabas

= Heteropsis sabas =

Species of butterfly

Heteropsis sabas is a butterfly in the family Nymphalidae. It is found on Madagascar. The habitat consists of forests.
