= Brakefieldia decira =

Scientific classification
- Kingdom: Animalia
- Phylum: Arthropoda
- Clade: Pancrustacea
- Class: Insecta
- Order: Lepidoptera
- Family: Nymphalidae
- Genus: Heteropsis
- Species: H. decira

Binomial name
- Heteropsis decira (Plötz, 1880)

Synonyms
- Mycalesis decira Plötz, 1880; Henotesia decira

Species of butterfly

Brakefieldia decira, formerly Heteropsis decira is a butterfly in the family Nymphalidae. It is found from Liberia to Ghana.

Torben Larsen developed a species numbering system for his 2005 publication Butterflies of West Africa. The species was described as Heteropsia peitho and given #714. The 'Larsen' number has been used with permission in A Sharp Eye on Butterflies of Ghana, with the species now described as Brakefieldia decira.
