= Heteropsis erebina =

Scientific classification
- Kingdom: Animalia
- Phylum: Arthropoda
- Clade: Pancrustacea
- Class: Insecta
- Order: Lepidoptera
- Family: Nymphalidae
- Genus: Heteropsis
- Species: H. erebina

Binomial name
- Heteropsis erebina (Oberthür, 1916)

Synonyms
- Culapa erebina Oberthür, 1916; Henotesia erebina; Houlbertia erebina; Heteropsis (Henotesia) erebina; Culapa grandis Oberthür, 1916

Species of butterfly

Heteropsis erebina is a butterfly in the family Nymphalidae. It is found in northern Madagascar. The habitat consists of forests and forest margins.
