= Heteropsis viettei =

Scientific classification
- Kingdom: Animalia
- Phylum: Arthropoda
- Clade: Pancrustacea
- Class: Insecta
- Order: Lepidoptera
- Family: Nymphalidae
- Genus: Heteropsis
- Species: H. viettei

Binomial name
- Heteropsis viettei Lees, 2003

Synonyms
- Heteropsis (Henotesia) viettei

Species of butterfly

Heteropsis viettei is a butterfly in the family Nymphalidae. It is found on the island of Madagascar. The habitat consists of forests and forest margins.
