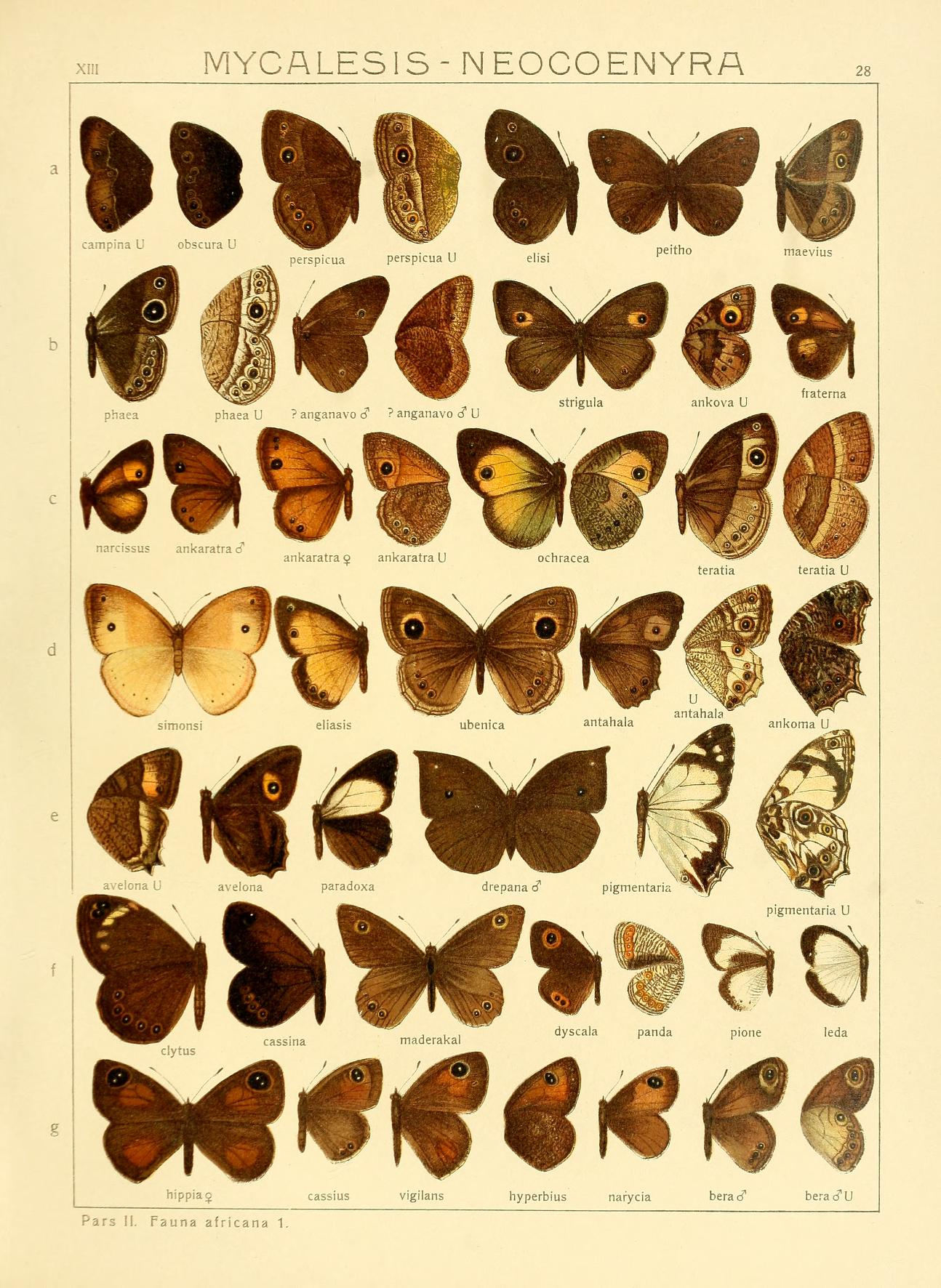
- In Adalbert Seitz's Fauna Africana

Scientific classification
- Kingdom: Animalia
- Phylum: Arthropoda
- Clade: Pancrustacea
- Class: Insecta
- Order: Lepidoptera
- Family: Nymphalidae
- Genus: Heteropsis
- Species: H. strigula

Binomial name
- Heteropsis strigula (Mabille, 1877)

Synonyms
- Mycalesis strigula Mabille, 1877; Henotesia strigula; Culapa wardiana Oberthür, 1916; Culapa ankovana Oberthür, 1916

= Heteropsis strigula =

Species of butterfly

Heteropsis strigula is a butterfly in the family Nymphalidae. It is found on Madagascar. The habitat consists of forests and forest margins.
