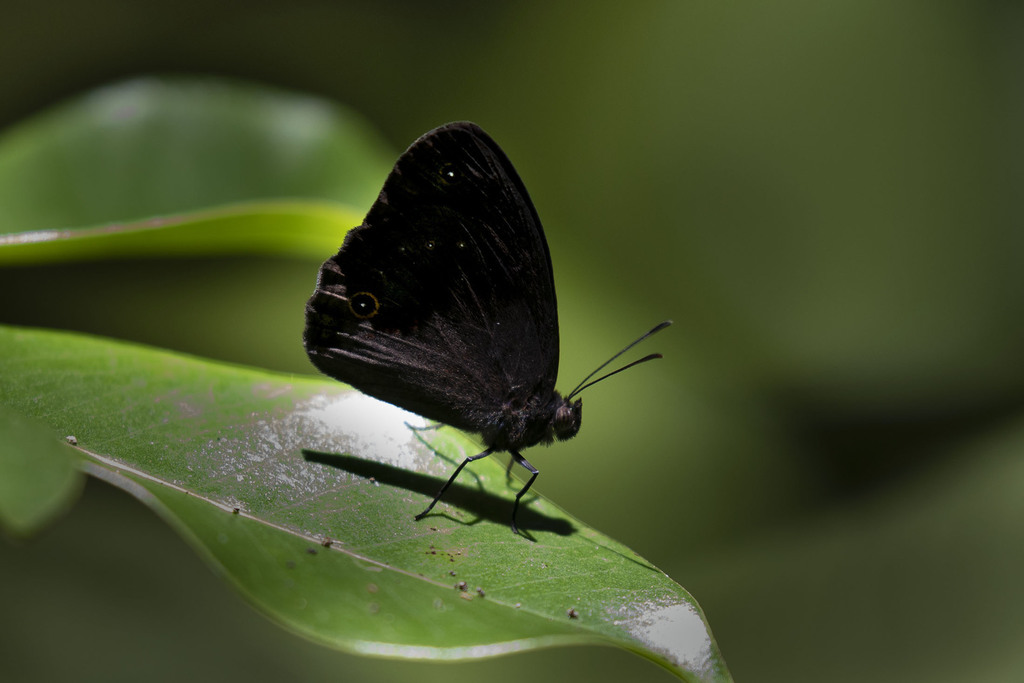

Scientific classification
- Kingdom: Animalia
- Phylum: Arthropoda
- Clade: Pancrustacea
- Class: Insecta
- Order: Lepidoptera
- Family: Nymphalidae
- Genus: Heteropsis
- Species: H. strato

Binomial name
- Heteropsis strato (Mabille, 1878)

Synonyms
- Mycalesis strato Mabille, 1878; Heteropsis (Henotesia) strato

= Heteropsis strato =

Species of butterfly

Heteropsis strato is a butterfly in the family Nymphalidae. It is found on Madagascar. The habitat consists of forests and forest margins.
