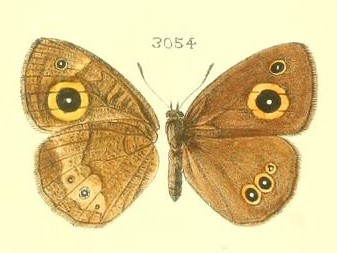
- Female

Scientific classification
- Kingdom: Animalia
- Phylum: Arthropoda
- Clade: Pancrustacea
- Class: Insecta
- Order: Lepidoptera
- Family: Nymphalidae
- Genus: Heteropsis
- Species: H. pallida

Binomial name
- Heteropsis pallida (Oberthür, 1916)

Synonyms
- Culapa pallida Oberthür, 1916; Henotesia pallida

= Heteropsis pallida =

Species of butterfly

Heteropsis pallida is a species of butterfly in the family Nymphalidae. It is found on Madagascar.
