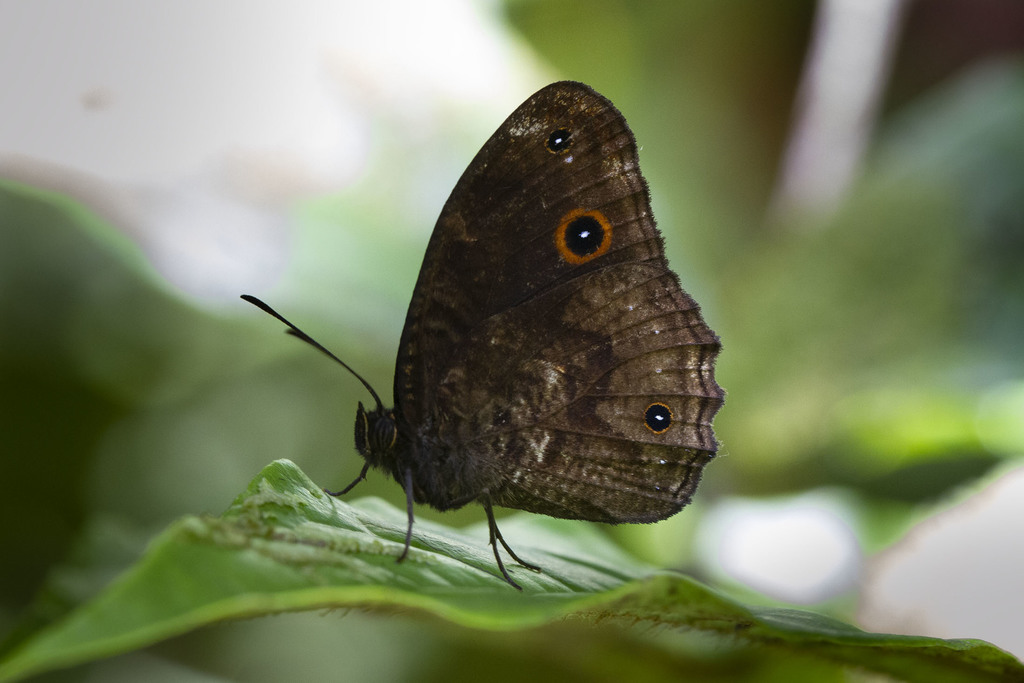

Scientific classification
- Kingdom: Animalia
- Phylum: Arthropoda
- Clade: Pancrustacea
- Class: Insecta
- Order: Lepidoptera
- Family: Nymphalidae
- Genus: Heteropsis
- Species: H. obscura

Binomial name
- Heteropsis obscura (Oberthür, 1916)

Synonyms
- Henotesia obscura Oberthür, 1916; Heteropsis (Henotesia) obscura; Henotesia obscura var. variegata Oberthür, 1916

= Heteropsis obscura =

Species of butterfly

Heteropsis obscura is a butterfly in the family Nymphalidae. It is found on Madagascar. The habitat consists of forests.
