= Heteropsis narova =

Scientific classification
- Kingdom: Animalia
- Phylum: Arthropoda
- Clade: Pancrustacea
- Class: Insecta
- Order: Lepidoptera
- Family: Nymphalidae
- Genus: Heteropsis
- Species: H. narova

Binomial name
- Heteropsis narova (Mabille, 1877)

Synonyms
- Mycalesis narova Mabille, 1877; Heteropsis (Henotesia) narova; Houlbertia narova

Species of butterfly

Heteropsis narova is a butterfly in the family Nymphalidae. It is found on Madagascar. The habitat consists of forests.
