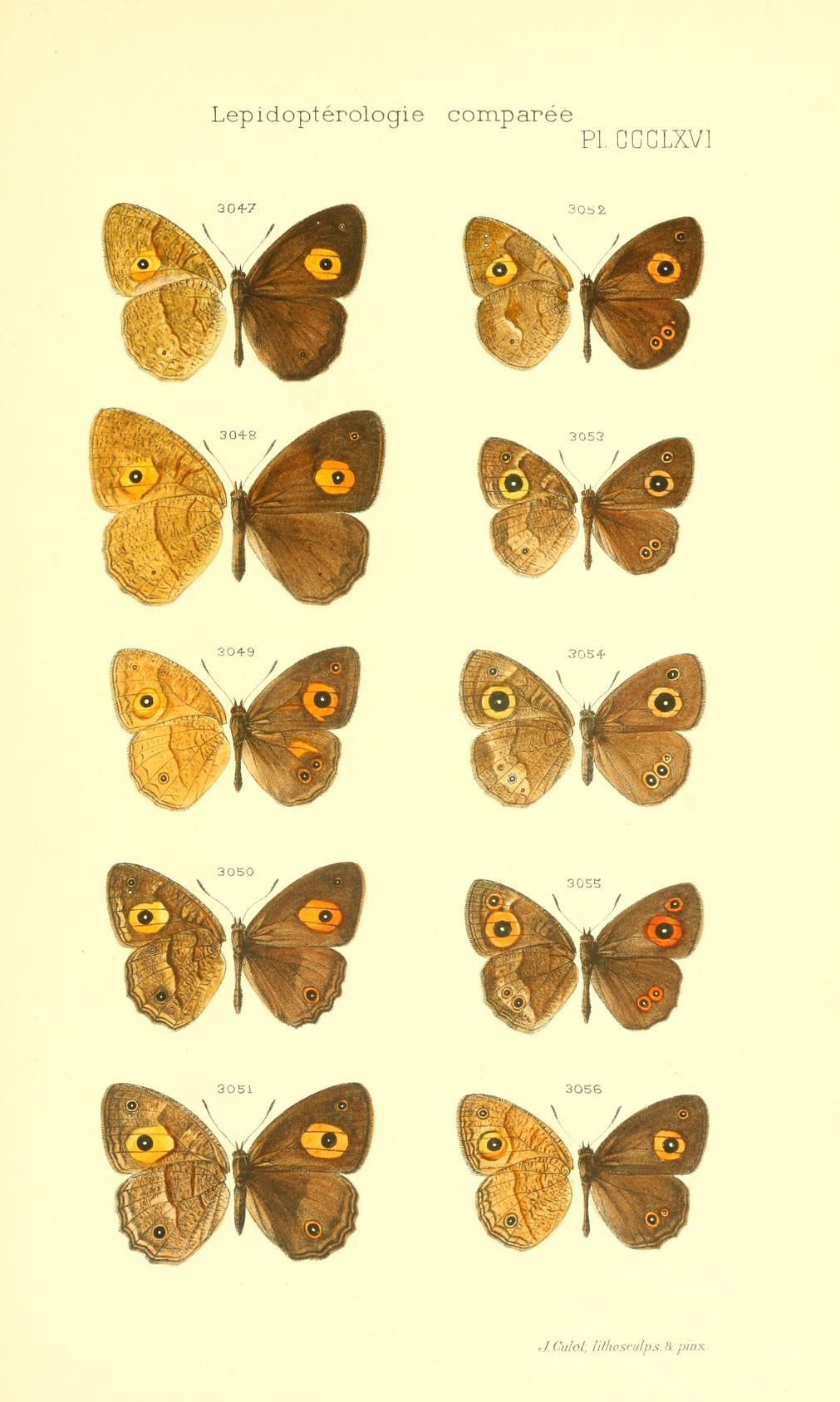
- Figures 3047 (male) and 3048 (female) in Oberthür's 1916 Lepidopterologie Comparie

Scientific classification
- Kingdom: Animalia
- Phylum: Arthropoda
- Clade: Pancrustacea
- Class: Insecta
- Order: Lepidoptera
- Family: Nymphalidae
- Genus: Heteropsis
- Species: H. anceps

Binomial name
- Heteropsis anceps (Oberthür, 1916)

Synonyms
- Culapa anceps Oberthür, 1916; Henotesia anceps

= Heteropsis anceps =

Species of butterfly

Heteropsis anceps is a butterfly in the family Nymphalidae. It is found on Madagascar.
