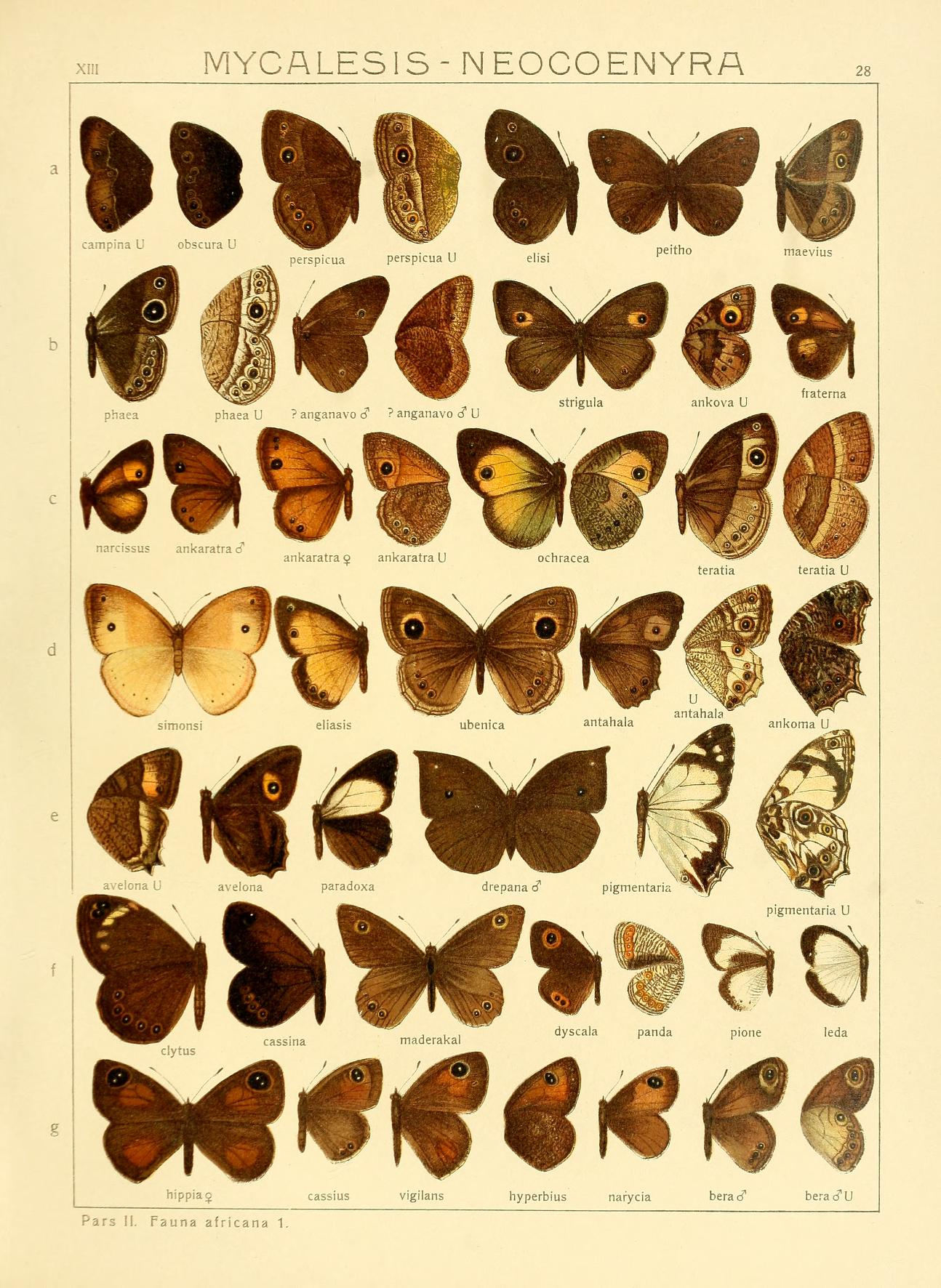
- From Adalbert Seitz's Fauna Africana

Scientific classification
- Kingdom: Animalia
- Phylum: Arthropoda
- Clade: Pancrustacea
- Class: Insecta
- Order: Lepidoptera
- Family: Nymphalidae
- Genus: Heteropsis
- Species: H. paradoxa

Binomial name
- Heteropsis paradoxa (Mabille, 1880)

Synonyms
- Smithia paradoxa Mabille, 1880; Admiratio paradoxa; Heteropsis (Admiratio) paradoxa

= Heteropsis paradoxa =

Species of butterfly

Heteropsis paradoxa is a butterfly in the family Nymphalidae. It is found on Madagascar. The habitat consists of forests.
