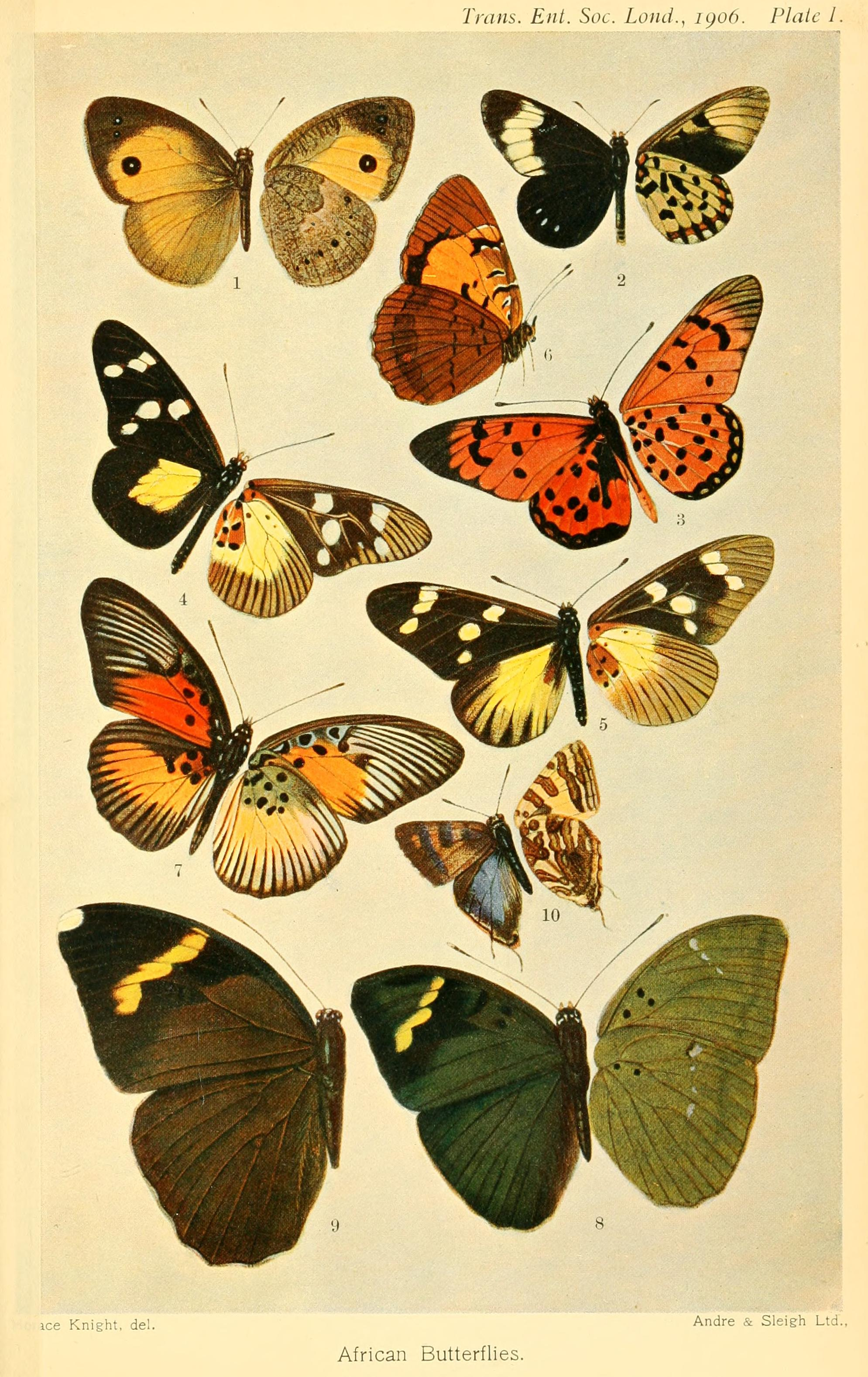
- Figure 1

Scientific classification
- Kingdom: Animalia
- Phylum: Arthropoda
- Clade: Pancrustacea
- Class: Insecta
- Order: Lepidoptera
- Family: Nymphalidae
- Genus: Heteropsis
- Species: H. ochracea

Binomial name
- Heteropsis ochracea (Lathy, 1906)

Synonyms
- Henotesia ochracea Lathy, 1906; Henotesia wellmanni Weymer, 1908; Henotesia ochracea f. semiochracea Talbot, 1932

= Heteropsis ochracea =

Species of butterfly

Heteropsis ochracea is a butterfly in the family Nymphalidae. It is found in Angola, where it is only known from the central plateau.
