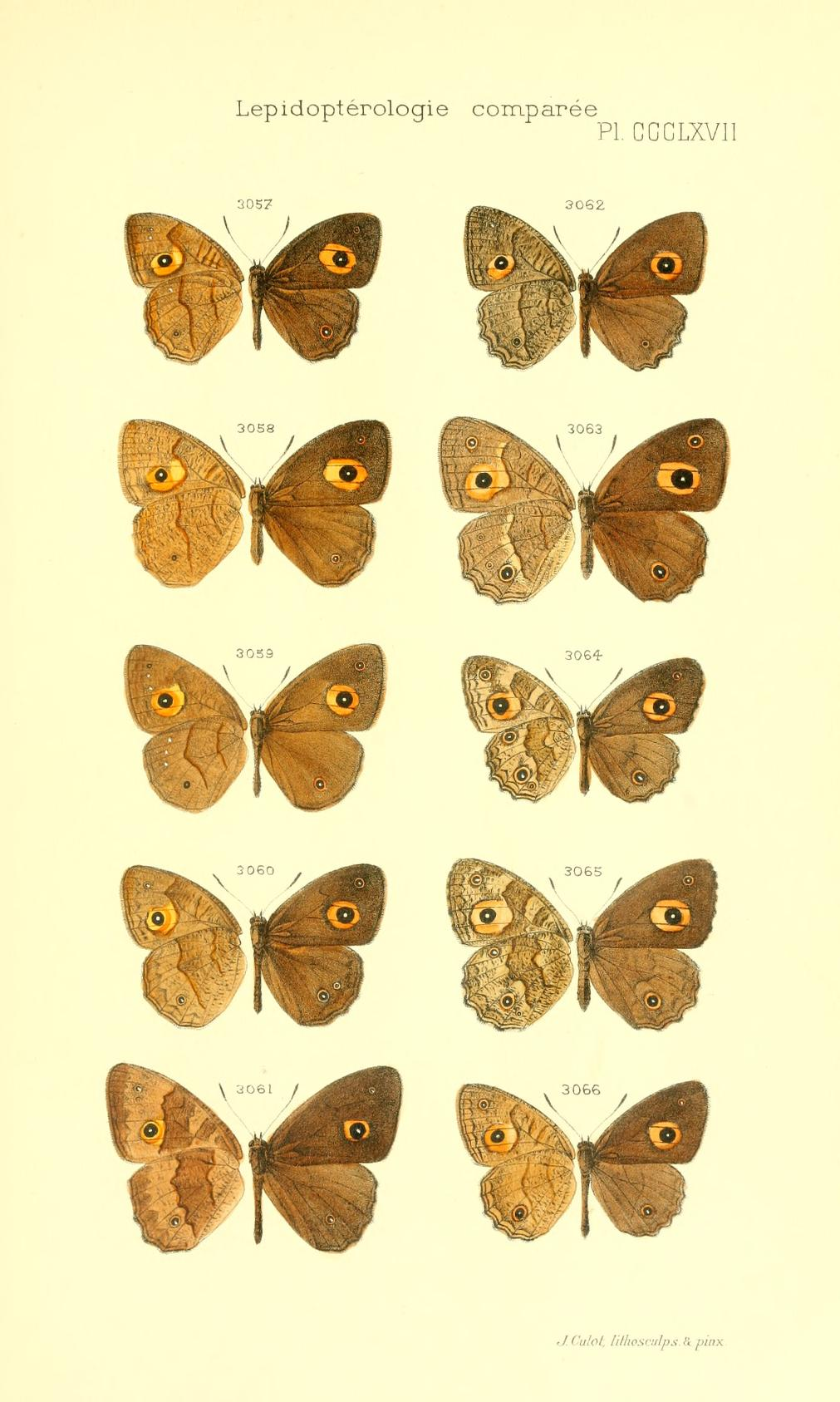
- Figures 3062 (male) and 3063 (female) in Oberthür's 1916 Lepidopterologie Comparie

Scientific classification
- Kingdom: Animalia
- Phylum: Arthropoda
- Clade: Pancrustacea
- Class: Insecta
- Order: Lepidoptera
- Family: Nymphalidae
- Genus: Heteropsis
- Species: H. undulans

Binomial name
- Heteropsis undulans (Oberthür, 1916)

Synonyms
- Culapa undulans Oberthür, 1916; Henotesia undulans

= Heteropsis undulans =

Species of butterfly

Heteropsis undulans is a butterfly in the family Nymphalidae. It is found on Madagascar. The habitat consists of forests.
