= Heteropsis angulifascia =

Scientific classification
- Kingdom: Animalia
- Phylum: Arthropoda
- Clade: Pancrustacea
- Class: Insecta
- Order: Lepidoptera
- Family: Nymphalidae
- Genus: Heteropsis
- Species: H. angulifascia

Binomial name
- Heteropsis angulifascia (Butler, 1879)

Synonyms
- Pseudonympha angulifascia Butler, 1879; Henotesia angulifascia; Mycalesis butleri Mabille, 1880

Species of butterfly

Heteropsis angulifascia is a butterfly in the family Nymphalidae. It is found on Madagascar. The habitat consists of forests.
