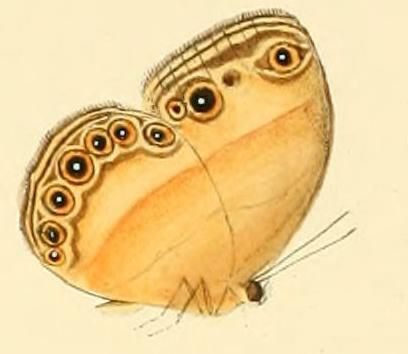

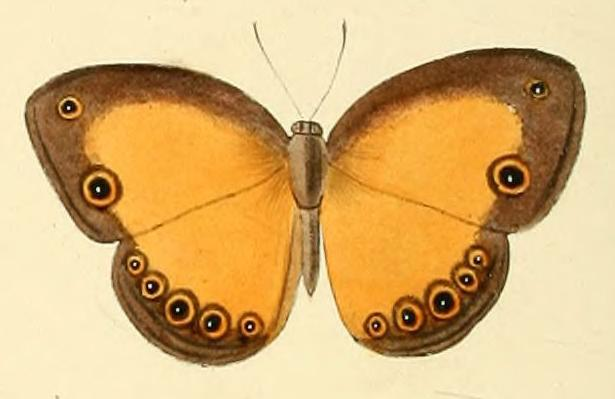

Scientific classification
- Kingdom: Animalia
- Phylum: Arthropoda
- Clade: Pancrustacea
- Class: Insecta
- Order: Lepidoptera
- Family: Nymphalidae
- Genus: Heteropsis
- Species: H. eliasis

Binomial name
- Heteropsis eliasis (Hewitson, 1866)

Synonyms
- Mycalesis eliasis Hewitson, 1866; Henotesia eliasis

= Heteropsis eliasis =

Species of butterfly

Heteropsis eliasis is a butterfly in the family Nymphalidae. It is found in the Democratic Republic of the Congo and Angola.
