= Heteropsis masoura =

Scientific classification
- Kingdom: Animalia
- Phylum: Arthropoda
- Clade: Pancrustacea
- Class: Insecta
- Order: Lepidoptera
- Family: Nymphalidae
- Genus: Heteropsis
- Species: H. masoura

Binomial name
- Heteropsis masoura (Hewitson, 1875)

Synonyms
- Melanitis masoura Hewitson, 1875; Masoura masoura; Heteropsis (Masoura) masoura

Species of butterfly

Heteropsis masoura is a butterfly in the family Nymphalidae. It is found on Madagascar.
