= Heteropsis laetifica =

Scientific classification
- Kingdom: Animalia
- Phylum: Arthropoda
- Clade: Pancrustacea
- Class: Insecta
- Order: Lepidoptera
- Family: Nymphalidae
- Genus: Heteropsis
- Species: H. laetifica

Binomial name
- Heteropsis laetifica (Oberthür, 1916)

Synonyms
- Culapa laetifica Oberthür, 1916; Henotesia laetifica

Species of butterfly

Heteropsis laetifica is a butterfly in the family Nymphalidae. It is found on Madagascar. Their habitat consists of forests.
