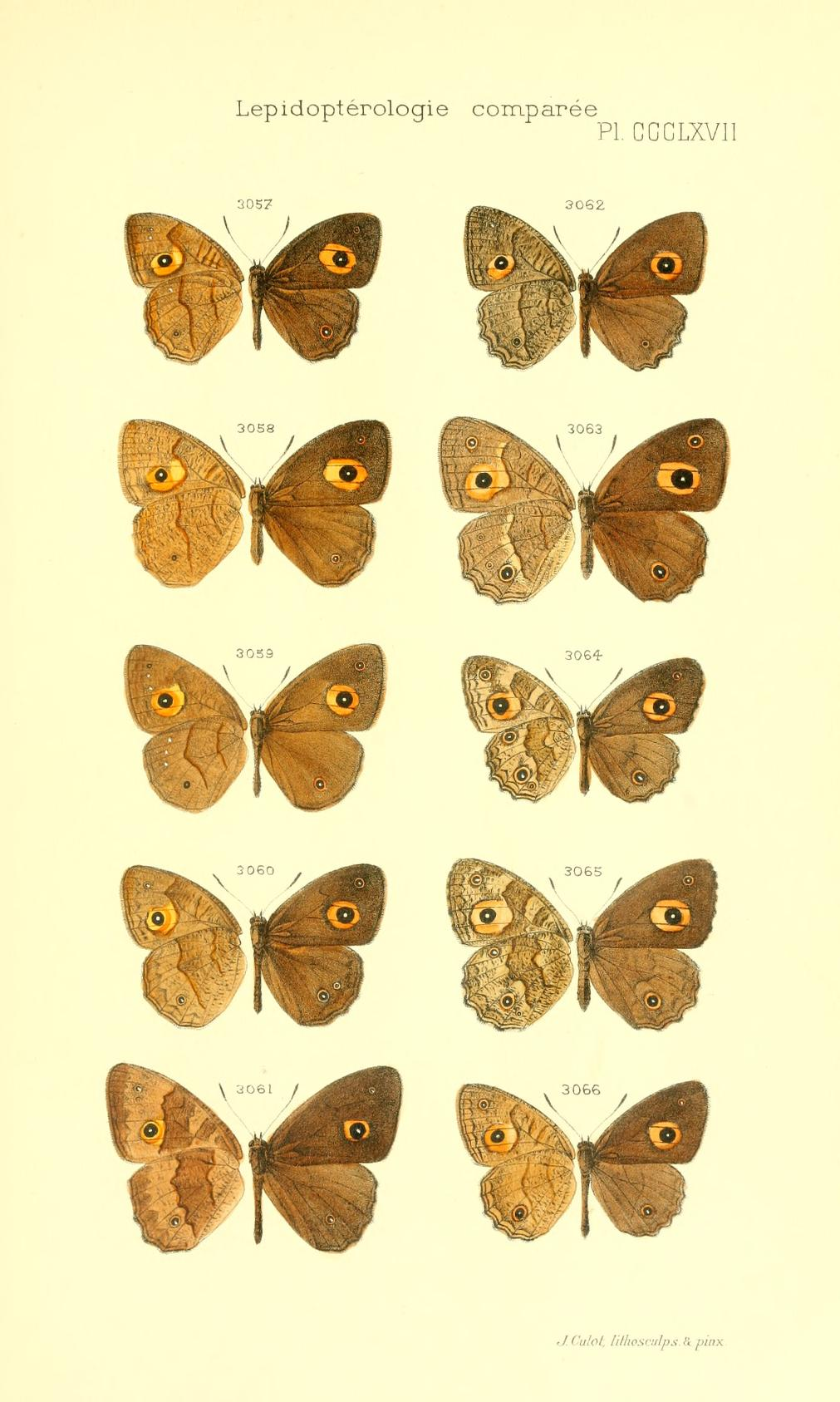
- Figure 3059 (male) in Charles Oberthür's 1916 Lepidopterologie Comparie

Scientific classification
- Kingdom: Animalia
- Phylum: Arthropoda
- Clade: Pancrustacea
- Class: Insecta
- Order: Lepidoptera
- Family: Nymphalidae
- Genus: Heteropsis
- Species: H. andasibe

Binomial name
- Heteropsis andasibe Lees, 2003

= Heteropsis andasibe =

Species of butterfly

Heteropsis andasibe is a butterfly in the family Nymphalidae, described by Lees in 2003 from Madagascar.
