= Heteropsis parvidens =

Scientific classification
- Kingdom: Animalia
- Phylum: Arthropoda
- Clade: Pancrustacea
- Class: Insecta
- Order: Lepidoptera
- Family: Nymphalidae
- Genus: Heteropsis
- Species: H. parvidens

Binomial name
- Heteropsis parvidens (Mabille, 1880)

Synonyms
- Mycalesis parvidens Mabille, 1880; Henotesia parvidens

Species of butterfly

Heteropsis parvidens is a butterfly in the family Nymphalidae. It is found on Madagascar. The habitat consists of forests.
