= Heteropsis wardii =

Scientific classification
- Kingdom: Animalia
- Phylum: Arthropoda
- Clade: Pancrustacea
- Class: Insecta
- Order: Lepidoptera
- Family: Nymphalidae
- Genus: Heteropsis
- Species: H. wardii

Binomial name
- Heteropsis wardii (Mabille, 1877)

Synonyms
- Mycalesis wardii Mabille, 1877; Houlbertia wardii; Heteropsis (Henotesia) wardii

Species of butterfly

Heteropsis wardii is a butterfly in the family Nymphalidae. It is found on Madagascar. The habitat consists of forests.
