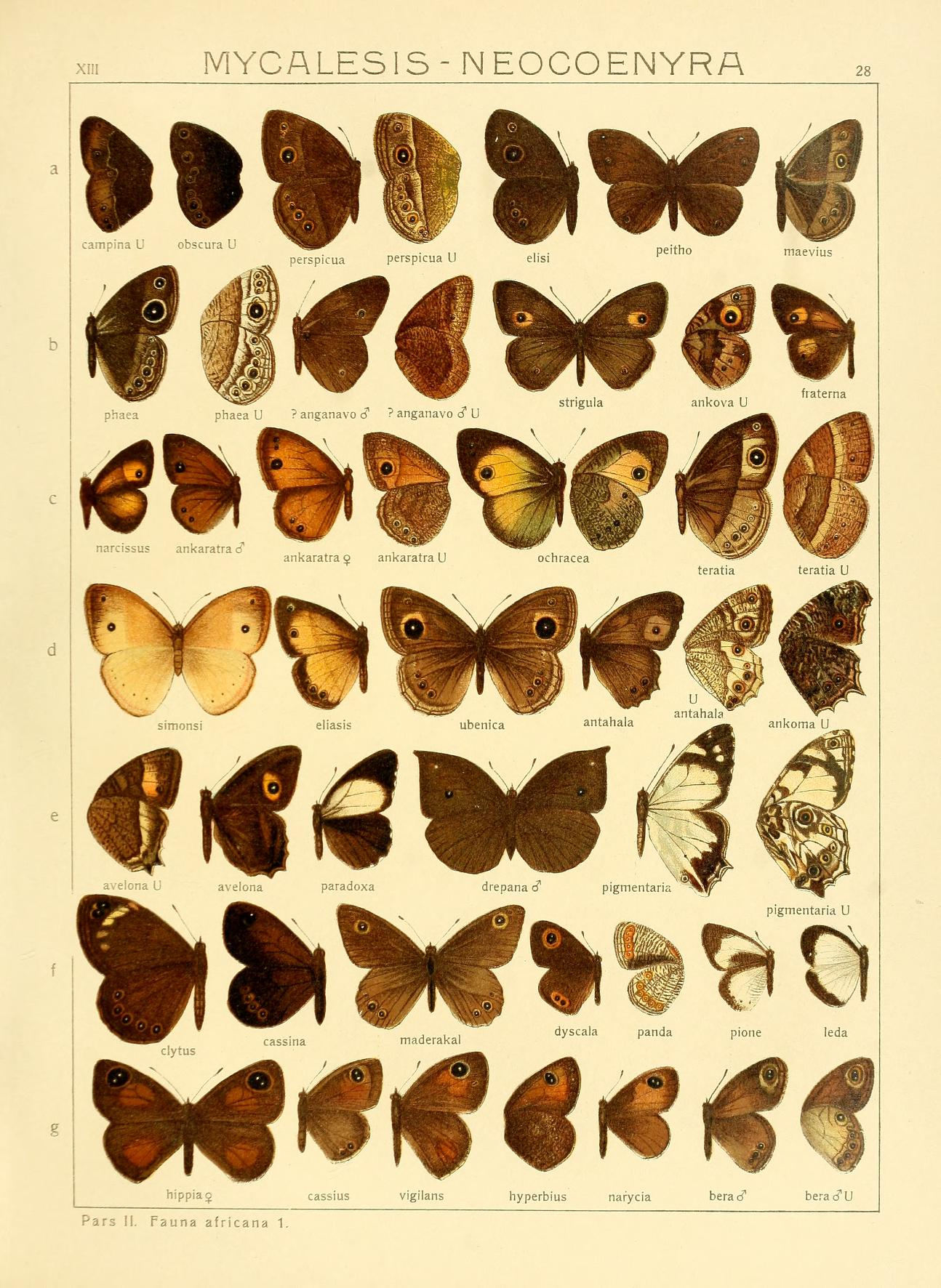
- In Adalbert Seitz's Fauna Africana

Scientific classification
- Kingdom: Animalia
- Phylum: Arthropoda
- Clade: Pancrustacea
- Class: Insecta
- Order: Lepidoptera
- Family: Nymphalidae
- Genus: Heteropsis
- Species: H. phaea

Binomial name
- Heteropsis phaea (Karsch, 1894)

Synonyms
- Mycalesis phaea Karsch, 1894; Henotesia phaea; Henotesia phaea katangensis Overlaet, 1955; Henotesia phaea katangensis f. albata Overlaet, 1955; Henotesia phaea ignota Libert, 2006

= Heteropsis phaea =

Species of butterfly

Heteropsis phaea is a butterfly in the family Nymphalidae. It is found in Angola, the Democratic Republic of the Congo, Uganda, Kenya, Tanzania and Zambia. The habitat consists of open Brachystegia woodland.

== Subspecies ==
- Heteropsis phaea phaea (Angola, eastern and southern Democratic Republic of the Congo, Uganda, north-western Tanzania, western Kenya, Zambia)
- Heteropsis phaea ignota (Libert, 2006) (Democratic Republic of the Congo)
