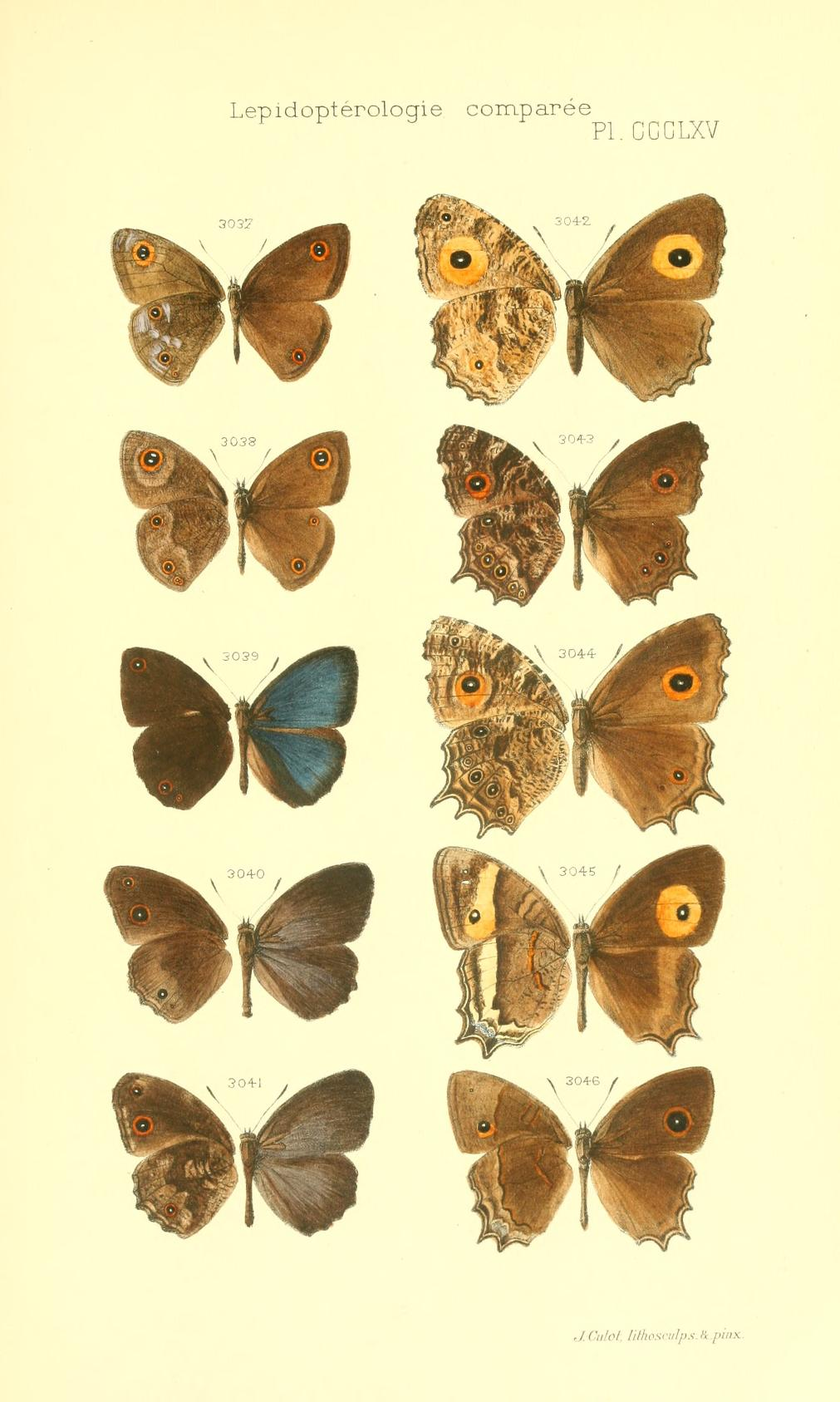
- Figures 3043 and 3044 in Oberthür's, 1916 Études de lépidoptérologie comparée

Scientific classification
- Kingdom: Animalia
- Phylum: Arthropoda
- Clade: Pancrustacea
- Class: Insecta
- Order: Lepidoptera
- Family: Nymphalidae
- Genus: Heteropsis
- Species: H. alaokola

Binomial name
- Heteropsis alaokola (Oberthür, 1916)

Synonyms
- Gallienia alaokola Oberthür, 1916; Masoura alaokola; Heteropsis (Masoura) alaokola

= Heteropsis alaokola =

Species of butterfly

Heteropsis alaokola is a butterfly in the family Nymphalidae. It is found on Madagascar. Its habitat consists of forests.
