= Heteropsis cowani =

Scientific classification
- Kingdom: Animalia
- Phylum: Arthropoda
- Clade: Pancrustacea
- Class: Insecta
- Order: Lepidoptera
- Family: Nymphalidae
- Genus: Heteropsis
- Species: H. cowani

Binomial name
- Heteropsis cowani (Butler, 1880)

Synonyms
- Pseudonympha cowani Butler, 1880; Henotesia cowani; Culpa houlbertiana Oberthür, 1923

Species of butterfly

Heteropsis cowani is a butterfly in the family Nymphalidae. It is found in Madagascar, where it is only known to be from the forests near Fianarantsoa. Their habitat consists of forests.
