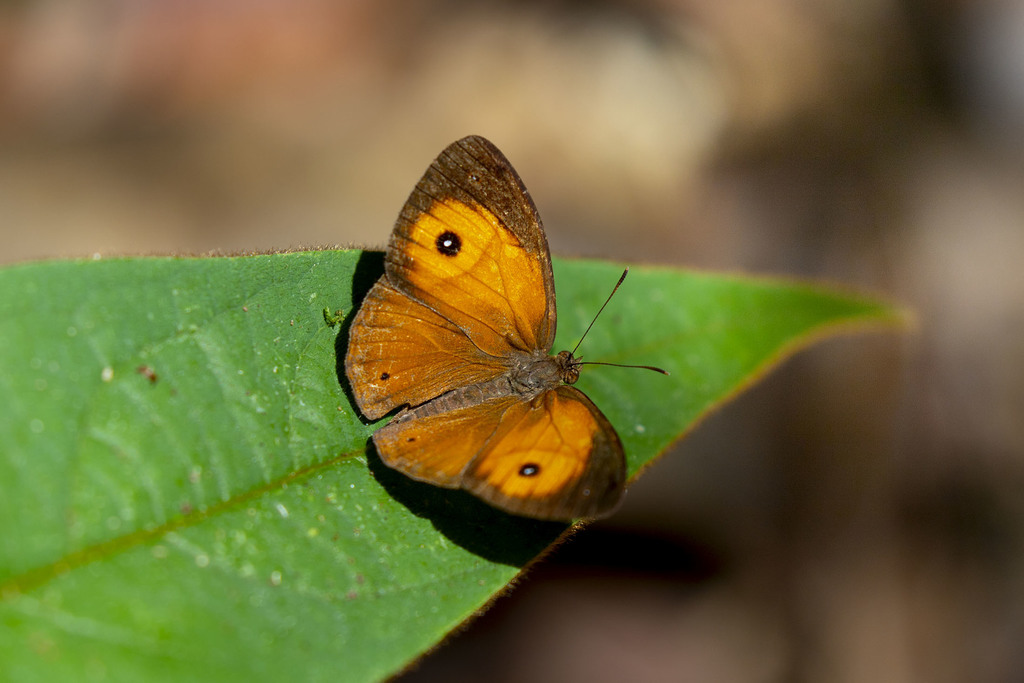

Scientific classification
- Kingdom: Animalia
- Phylum: Arthropoda
- Clade: Pancrustacea
- Class: Insecta
- Order: Lepidoptera
- Family: Nymphalidae
- Genus: Heteropsis
- Species: H. maeva

Binomial name
- Heteropsis maeva (Mabille, 1878)

Synonyms
- Mycalesis maeva Mabille, 1878; Henotesia maeva

= Heteropsis maeva =

Species of butterfly

Heteropsis maeva is a butterfly in the family Nymphalidae. It is found on Madagascar. The habitat consists of forests.
