= Heteropsis laeta =

Scientific classification
- Kingdom: Animalia
- Phylum: Arthropoda
- Clade: Pancrustacea
- Class: Insecta
- Order: Lepidoptera
- Family: Nymphalidae
- Genus: Heteropsis
- Species: H. laeta

Binomial name
- Heteropsis laeta (Oberthür, 1916)

Synonyms
- Culapa laeta Oberthür, 1916; Henotesia laeta

Species of butterfly

Heteropsis laeta is a butterfly in the family Nymphalidae. It is found on Madagascar. The habitat consists of forests.
