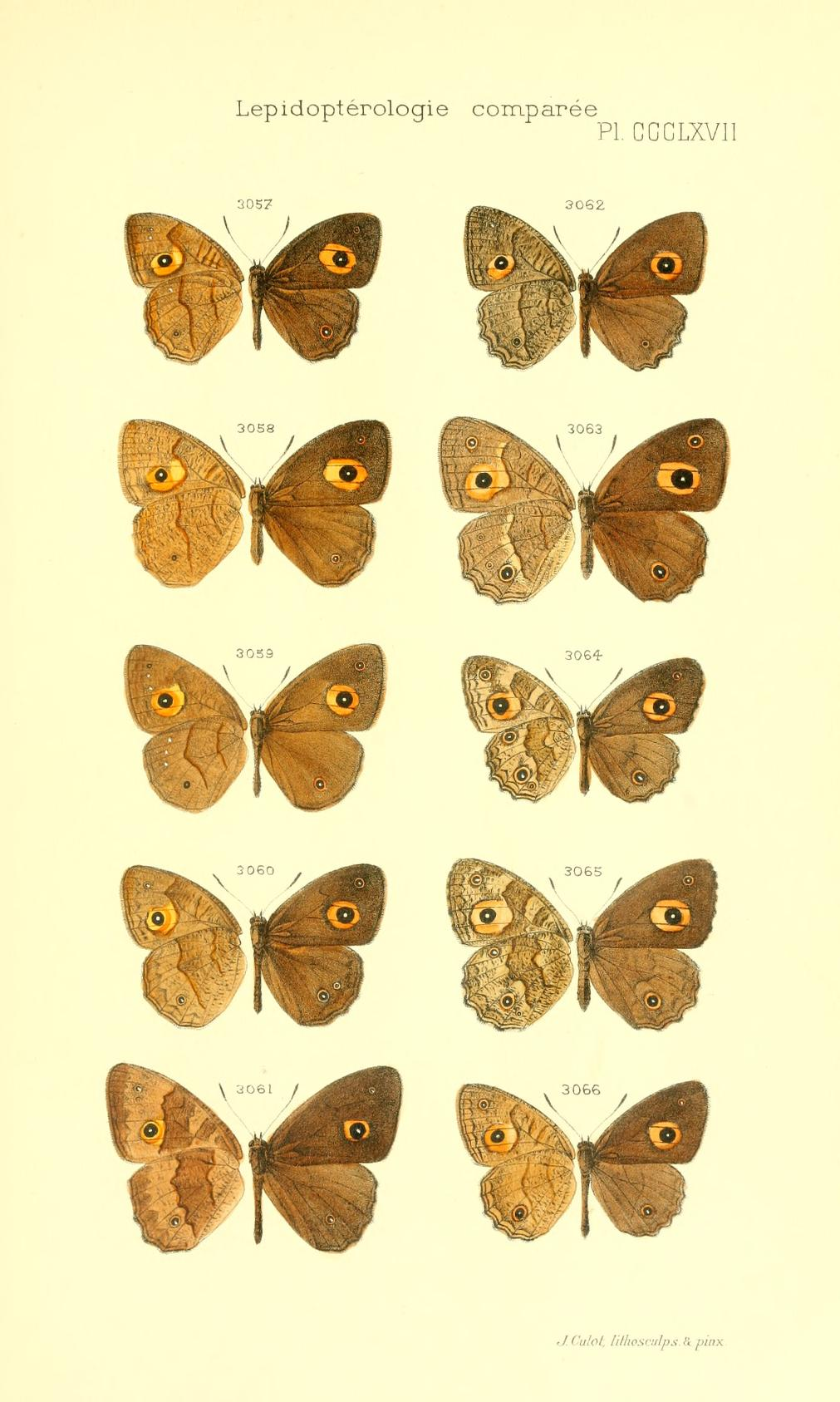
- Figures 3057 (male) and 3058 (female) in Oberthür's 1916 Lepidopterologie Comparie

Scientific classification
- Kingdom: Animalia
- Phylum: Arthropoda
- Clade: Pancrustacea
- Class: Insecta
- Order: Lepidoptera
- Family: Nymphalidae
- Genus: Heteropsis
- Species: H. turbans

Binomial name
- Heteropsis turbans (Oberthür, 1916)

Synonyms
- Culapa turbans Oberthür, 1916; Henotesia turbans; Culapa curvatula Oberthür, 1916

= Heteropsis turbans =

Species of butterfly

Heteropsis turbans is a butterfly in the family Nymphalidae. It is found on Madagascar. The habitat consists of forests.
