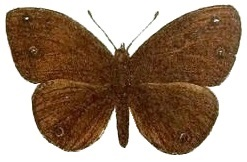
- In Adalbert Seitz's Fauna Africana

Scientific classification
- Kingdom: Animalia
- Phylum: Arthropoda
- Clade: Pancrustacea
- Class: Insecta
- Order: Lepidoptera
- Family: Nymphalidae
- Genus: Heteropsis
- Species: H. peitho

Binomial name
- Heteropsis peitho (Plötz, 1880)

Synonyms
- Mycalesis peitho Plötz, 1880; Henotesia peitho; Houlbertia peitho; Henotesia peitho gigas Libert, 2006; Heteropsis peitho reducta Libert, 2006

= Heteropsis peitho =

Forest patroller

Species of butterfly

Heteropsis peitho, the forest patroller, is a butterfly in the family Nymphalidae. It is found in Guinea, Liberia, Ivory Coast, Ghana, Nigeria, Cameroon, Gabon, the Republic of the Congo, the Democratic Republic of the Congo, Uganda, western Kenya and north-western Tanzania. The habitat consists of high forests.

== Subspecies ==
- Heteropsis peitho peitho (Guinea, Liberia, Ivory Coast, Ghana, Nigeria, Cameroon, Gabon, Congo, Democratic Republic of the Congo)
- Heteropsis peitho gigas (Libert, 2006) (western Kenya, north-western Tanzania)
- Heteropsis peitho reducta (Libert, 2006) (Uganda)
