= Christopher Ward (entomologist) =

English entomologist (1836–1900)

Christopher Ward (1836 – 1900) was an English entomologist who specialised in butterflies.

He wrote African Lepidoptera, being descriptions of new species, published in London by Longmans, Green & Co. (1873-1875?). This quarto work in three parts has 16 pages and 18 plates, 12 of which are handcoloured. It is based on two papers Ward had previously published in the Entomologist's Monthly Magazine. These were "Descriptions of new species of Diurnal Lepidoptera From Madagascar" and "Descriptions of new species of African Diurnal Lepidoptera" (butterflies in this last work are depicted in Part 3 of African Lepidoptera but the text is omitted). This well-illustrated, rare work is an important contribution to the knowledge of the East African butterfly fauna as it contains descriptions of 55 new species chiefly from Madagascar, the Cameroons, Old Calabar and Ribé (East Africa).

Ward was a Fellow of the Linnean Society. His collection is in the Muséum national d'histoire naturelle except the types, which were sold to Charles Oberthur.

== Ward's papers in the Entomologist's Monthly Magazine ==
- Ward, C. (1870): Descriptions of new species of diurnal lepidoptera from Madagascar. Entomologist's Monthly Magazine 6:224-228.
- Ward, C. (1870): Descriptions of new species of diurnal lepidoptera from Madagascar. Entomologist's Monthly Magazine 7:30-32.
- Ward, C. (1871): Description of new species of African diurnal lepidoptera. Entomologist's Monthly Magazine 8:34-36; 58-60; 81-82; 118-122.
- Ward, C. (1872): Descriptions of new species of diurnal lepidoptera from Madagascar. Entomologist's Monthly Magazine 9:2-3.
- Ward, C. (1872): Descriptions of new species of African diurnal lepidoptera. Entomologist's Monthly Magazine 9:147-149.
- Ward, C. (1873): Descriptions of new species of African lepidoptera. Entomologist's Monthly Magazine 10:151-152.
- Ward, C. (1873): Descriptions of new species of African lepidoptera. Entomologist's Monthly Magazine 9:209-210.
