= List of butterflies of Madagascar =

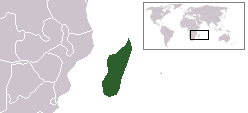
Location of Madagascar

This is a list of butterflies of Madagascar. 325 species are known from Madagascar, a remarkable 243 (75%) of which are endemic.

== Papilionidae ==
=== Papilioninae ===
==== Troidini ====
- Pharmacophagus antenor (Drury, 1773)

==== Leptocercini ====
- Graphium cyrnus (Boisduval, 1836)
- Graphium endochus (Boisduval, 1836)
- Graphium evombar evombar (Boisduval, 1836)

==== Papilionini ====
- Papilio oribazus Boisduval, 1836
- Papilio epiphorbas epiphorbas Boisduval, 1833
- Papilio mangoura Hewitson, 1875
- Papilio delalande Godart, [1824]
- Papilio meriones Felder & Felder, [1865]
- Papilio morondavana Grose-Smith, 1891
- Papilio grosesmithi Rothschild, 1926
- Papilio erithonioides Grose-Smith, 1891
- Papilio demodocus demodocus Esper, [1798]

== Hesperiidae ==
=== Coeliadinae ===
- Tekliades ramanatek ramanatek (Boisduval, 1833)
- Coeliades fervida (Butler, 1880)
- Coeliades pisistratus fidia Evans, 1937
- Coeliades rama Evans, 1937
- Coeliades forestan arbogastes (Guenée, 1863)
- Coeliades pansa (Hewitson, [1867])

=== Tagiadinae ===
==== Celaenorrhinini ====
- Celaenorrhinus ambra Evans, 1937
- Celaenorrhinus humbloti (Mabille, 1884)
- Celaenorrhinus landryi (Libert, 2014)

==== Tagiadini ====
- Eagris smithii (Mabille, [1887])
- Eagris sabadius andracne (Boisduval, [1832])
- Tagiades insularis insularis Mabille, 1876
- Tagiades samborana samborana Grose-Smith, 1891

=== Heteropterini ===
- Hovala dispar (Mabille, 1877)
- Hovala amena (Grose-Smith, 1891)
- Hovala pardalina (Butler, 1879)
- Hovala gallienii (Oberthür, 1916)
- Hovala saclavus (Mabille, 1891)
- Hovala arota Evans, 1937

=== Malazinae ===
- Malaza carmides (Hewitson, 1868)
- Malaza empyreus (Mabille, 1878)
- Malaza fastuosus (Mabille, 1884)

=== Hesperiinae ===
==== Astictopterini ====
- Acleros leucopyga (Mabille, 1877)
- Artitropa boseae (Saalmüller, 1880)
- Artitropa alaotrana Oberthür, 1916
- Artitropa hollandi Oberthür, 1916
- Galerga hyposticta Mabille, 1898
- Galerga fito (Evans, 1937)
- Galerga ariel (Mabille, 1878)
- Galerga bernieri (Boisduval, 1833)
- Galerga imorina (Evans, 1937)
- Galerga coroller (Boisduval, 1833)
- Galerga australis (Viette, 1956)
- Galerga rhadama (Boisduval, 1833)
- Galerga ellipsis (Saalmüller, 1884)
- Galerga paroechus (Mabille, [1887])
- Galerga albiplaga (Oberthür, 1916)
- Galerga malchus (Mabille, 1879)
- Galerga eximia (Oberthür, 1923)
- Galerga gillias (Mabille, 1878)
- Galerga gala (Mabille, 1878)
- Galerga kingdoni (Butler, 1879)
- Galerga ismael (Oberthür, 1916)
- Galerga howa (Mabille, 1876)
- Galerga silvestralis (Viette, 1956)
- Galerga varians (Oberthür, 1916)
- Galerga sylvia (Evans, 1937)
- Galerga ochracea (Evans, 1937)
- Galerga flora (Oberthür, 1923)
- Galerga sida (Evans, 1937)

==== Erionotini ====
- Ploetzia amygdalis (Mabille, 1877)

==== Baorini ====
- Parnara poutieri (Boisduval, 1833)
- Pelopidas mathias (Fabricius, 1798)
- Gegenes pumilio (Hoffmansegg, 1804)
- Gegenes havei (Boisduval, 1833)
- Borbo ratek (Boisduval, 1833)
- Borbo borbonica (Boisduval, 1833)
- Borbo gemella (Mabille, 1884)

== Pieridae ==
=== Coliadinae ===
- Eurema pulchella (Boisduval, 1833)
- Eurema desjardinsii desjardinsii (Boisduval, 1833)
- Eurema hapale (Mabille, 1882)
- Eurema floricola floricola (Boisduval, 1833)
- Eurema senegalensis (Boisduval, 1833)
- Catopsilia florella (Fabricius, 1775)
- Catopsilia thauruma (Reakirt, 1866)

=== Pierinae ===
==== Leptosiaini ====
- Leptosia sylvicola (Boisduval, 1833)
- Leptosia viettei Bernardi, 1959
- Nepheronia pauliani Bernardi, 1958

==== Teracolini ====
- Gideona lucasi (Grandidier, 1867)
- Pinacopterix mabillei (Aurivillius, [1899])
- Colotis evanthe (Boisduval, 1836)
- Colotis euippe (Linnaeus, 1858)
- Colotis guenei (Mabille, 1877)
- Colotis zoe (Grandidier, 1867)
- Colotis calais (Cramer, 1775)
- Colotis mananhari (Ward, 1870)

==== Pierini ====
- Appias epaphia (Cramer, [1779])
- Appias sabina confusa (Butler, 1872)
- Dixeia narena (Grose-Smith, 1898)
- Belenois mabella Grose-Smith, 1891
- Belenois helcida (Boisduval, 1833)
- Belenois creona (Cramer, [1776])
- Belenois antsianaka (Ward, 1870)
- Belenois grandidieri (Mabille, 1878)
- Belenois aurota (Fabricius, 1793)
- Mylothris phileris (Boisduval, 1833)
- Mylothris smithii (Mabille, 1879)
- Mylothris splendens Le Cerf, 1927

== Riodinidae ==
=== Nemeobiinae ===
==== Abisarini ====
- Saribia decaryi (Le Cerf, 1922)
- Saribia ochracea Riley, 1932
- Saribia perroti Riley, 1932
- Saribia tepahi (Boisduval, 1833)

== Lycaenidae ==
=== Miletinae ===
==== Miletini ====
- Spalgis tintinga (Boisduval, 1833)
- Lachnocnema bibulus (Fabricius, 1793)

=== Theclinae ===
==== Deudorigini ====
- Capys renidens (Mabille, 1884)
- Capys tsiphana (Boisduval, 1833)
- Capys diopolis (Hewitson, 1878)
- Capys batikeli (Boisduval, 1833)
- Capys dieden (Karsch, 1900)

==== Iolaini ====
- Trichiolaus argentarius (Butler, 1879)
- Trichiolaus mermeros (Mabille, 18798)

=== Polyommatinae ===
==== Oxylidini ====
- Hemiolaus ceres (Hewitson, 1865)
- Hemiolaus maryra (Mabille, 1885)
- Hemiolaus varnieri Stempffer, 1942)
- Hemiolaus cobaltina (Aurivillius, [1899])

==== Hypolycaenini ====
- Hypolycaena ramonza (Saalmüller, 1878)
- Leptomyrina phidias (Fabricius, 1793)

==== Lycaenesthini ====
- Anthene smithii (Mabille, 1877)
- Cupidopsis jobates (Hopffer, 1855)
- Cupidopsis cissus aberrans (Butler, 1878)

==== Polyommatini ====
- Petrelaea reticulum (Mabille, 1877)
- Azanus jesous soalalicus (Karsch, 1900)
- Azanus decaryi (Stempffer, 1947)
- Azanus sitalces sitalces (Mabille, 1900)
- Zizula hylax (Fabricius, 1775)
- Chilades pandava (Horsfield, [1829])
- Freyeria parva (Murray, 1874)
- Freyeria minuscula (Aurivillius, 1909)
- Actizera lucida (Trimen, 1883)
- Actizera atrigemmata (Butler, 1878)
- Leptotes pirithous durrelli Fric, Pyrcz & Wiemers, 2019
- Leptotes rabefaner (Mabille, 1877)
- Cacyreus darius (Mabille, 1877)
- Lampides boeticus (Linnaeus, 1767)
- Uranothauma artemenes (Mabille, 1880)
- Eicochrysops sanguigutta (Mabille, 1879)
- Eicochrysops hippocrates (Fabricius, 1793)
- Eicochrysops pauliani Stempffer, 1950
- Zizeeria knysna (Trimen, 1862)
- Zizina otis (Fabricius, 1787)
- Rysops scintilla (Mabille, 1877)
- Euchrysops malathana (Boisduval, 1833)
- Euchrysops osiris (Hopffer, 1855)
- Lepidochrysops turlini Stempffer, 1971
- Lepidochrysops azureus (Butler, 1879)
- Lepidochrysops leucon (Mabille, 1879)
- Lepidochrysops grandis Talbot, 1937

== Nymphalidae ==
=== Danainae ===
==== Danaini ====
- Danaus chrysippus (Linnaeus, 1758)
- Amauris nossima nossima (Ward, 1870)

=== Libytheinae ===
- Libythea tsiandava Grose-Smith, 1891
- Libythea ancoata Grose-Smith, 1891

=== Charaxinae ===
==== Charaxini ====
- Charaxes betsimisaraka Lucas, 1872
- Charaxes madagascariensis (Lucas, 1843)
- Charaxes analava Ward, 1872
- Charaxes cacuthis Hewitson, 1863
- Charaxes antamboulou Lucas, 1872
- Charaxes cowani Butler, 1878
- Charaxes andara Ward, 1873
- Charaxes andrefana Viette, 1975
- Charaxes andranodorus Mabille, 1884
- Charaxes zoippus Mabille, 1884
- Charaxes phraortes Doubleday, 1847

=== Satyrinae ===
==== Amathusiini ====
- Gnophodes betsimena (Boisduval, 1833)
- Melanitis leda (Linnaeus, 1758)

==== Satyrini ====
- Heteropsis ankaratra (Ward, 1870)
- Heteropsis fraterna (Butler, 1868)
- Heteropsis paradoxa (Mabille, 1880)
- Heteropsis masoura (Hewitson, 1875)
- Heteropsis antahala (Ward, 1872)
- Heteropsis ankoma (Mabille, 1878)
- Heteropsis hazovola Lees & Raharitsimba, 2016
- Heteropsis mabillei (Butler, 1879)
- Heteropsis alaokola (Oberthür, 1916)
- Heteropsis vola (Ward, 1870)
- Heteropsis parva (Butler, 1879)
- Heteropsis iboina (Ward, 1870)
- Heteropsis bicristata (Mabille, 1878)
- Heteropsis parvidens (Mabille, 1880)
- Heteropsis avelona (Ward, 1870)
- Heteropsis uniformis (Oberthür, 1916)
- Heteropsis fuliginosa (Mabille, 1878)
- Heteropsis drepana Westwood, [1850]
- Heteropsis narova (Mabille, 1877)
- Heteropsis anganavo (Ward, 1871)
- Heteropsis strato (Mabille, 1878)
- Heteropsis erebennis Oberthür, 1916
- Heteropsis wardii (Mabille, 1877)
- Heteropsis erebina (Oberthür, 1916)
- Heteropsis passandava (Ward, 1871)
- Heteropsis viettei Lees, 2003
- Heteropsis westwoodi Lees, 2016
- Heteropsis imerina Lees, 2016
- Heteropsis pauliani Lees, 2016
- Heteropsis andravahana (Mabille, 1878)
- Heteropsis obscura (Oberthür, 1916)
- Heteropsis harveyi Lees & Kremen, 2016
- Heteropsis vanewrighti Lees, 2016
- Heteropsis exocellata (Mabille, 1880)
- Heteropsis cowani (Butler, 1880)
- Heteropsis mimetica Lees & Kremen, 2016
- Heteropsis pauper (Oberthür, 1916)
- Heteropsis kremenae Lees, 2016
- Heteropsis subsimilis (Butler, 1879)
- Heteropsis avaratra Lees & Kremen, 2016
- Heteropsis sogai Lees, 2016
- Heteropsis tornado Lees, Allaoui & Aduse-Poku, 2016
- Heteropsis turbata (Butler, 1880)
- Heteropsis pallida (Oberthür, 1916)
- Heteropsis ankova (Ward, 1870)
- Heteropsis lanyvary Lees, 2016
- Heteropsis strigula (Mabille, 1877)
- Heteropsis laetifica (Oberthür, 1916)
- Heteropsis laeta (Oberthür, 1916)
- Heteropsis undulans (Oberthür, 1916)
- Heteropsis andasibe Lees, 2003
- Heteropsis roussettae Lees & Kremen, 2016
- Heteropsis anceps (Oberthür, 1916)
- Heteropsis maeva (Mabille, 1878)
- Heteropsis menamenoides Lees, 2016
- Heteropsis barbarae Lees & Kremen, 2016
- Heteropsis angulifascia (Butler, 1879)
- Heteropsis borgo Lees, 2016
- Heteropsis tianae Lees & Kremen, 2016
- Heteropsis oberthueri Lees, 2016
- Heteropsis turbans (Oberthür, 1916)
- Heteropsis vertigo Lees & Raharitsimba, 2016
- Heteropsis sabas (Oberthür, 1923)
- Strabena dyscola Mabille, 1880
- Strabena sufferti (Aurivillius, [1899])
- Strabena tamatavae (Boisduval, 1833)
- Strabena goudotii (Mabille, 1885)
- Strabena isoalensis Paulian, 1951
- Strabena martini Oberthür, 1916
- Strabena zanjuka Mabille, [1885]
- Strabena niveata (Butler, 1879)
- Strabena consors Oberthür, 1916
- Strabena impar Oberthür, 1916
- Strabena excellens (Butler, 1885)
- Strabena mopsus (Mabille, 1878)
- Strabena modestissima Oberthür, 1916
- Strabena soror Oberthür, 1916
- Strabena consobrina Oberthür, 1916
- Strabena batesii (Felder & Felder, 1867)
- Strabena mabillei (Aurivillius, [1899])
- Strabena perroti Oberthür, 1916
- Strabena albivittula (Mabille, 1880)
- Strabena argyrina Mabille, 1878
- Strabena rakoto (Ward, 1870)
- Strabena tsaratananae Paulian, 1951
- Strabena vinsoni (Guenée, 1865)
- Strabena affinis Oberthür, 1916
- Strabena nepos Oberthür, 1916
- Strabena eros Viette, 1971
- Strabena germanus Oberthür, 1916
- Strabena triophthalma Mabille, [1885]
- Strabena perrieri Paulian, 1951
- Strabena andilabe Paulian, 1951
- Strabena daphne Viette, 1971
- Strabena andriana Mabille, 1885
- Strabena smithii Mabille, 1877
- Strabena mandraka Paulian, 1951
- Strabena ibitina (Ward, 1873)

=== Heliconiinae ===
==== Acraeini ====
- Acraea turna Mabille, 1877
- Acraea marmorata Grose-Smith & Kirby, 1892
- Acraea ranavalona Boisduval, 1833
- Acraea hova Boisduval, 1833
- Acraea dammii van Vollenhoven, 1869
- Acraea igati Boisduval, 1833
- Acraea mahela Boisduval, 1833
- Telchinia fornax (Butler, 1879)
- Telchinia calida (Butler, 1878)
- Telchinia zitja (Boisduval, 1833)
- Telchinia lia (Mabille, 1879)
- Telchinia serena (Fabricius, 1775)
- Telchinia encedon (Linnaeus, 1758)
- Telchinia encedana (Pierre, 1976)
- Telchinia obeira (Hewitson, 1863)
- Telchinia andromba (Grose-Smith, 1891)
- Telchinia sambavae (Ward, 1873)
- Telchinia masamba (Ward, 1872)
- Telchinia strattipocles (Oberthür, 1893)

==== Argynnidini ====
- Pardopsis punctatissima (Boisduval, 1833)

==== Vagrantini ====
- Smerina manoro (Ward, 1871)
- Phalanta madagascariensis (Mabille, 1885)
- Phalanta aethiopica (Rothschild & Jordan, 1903)

=== Limenitidinae ===
==== Cymothoini ====
- Cymothoe dujardini Viette, 1971
- Cymothoe lambertoni Oberthür, 1923

==== Adoliadini ====
- Euptera kinugnana insularis Collins, 1995
- Aterica rabena Boisduval, 1833

==== Neptini ====
- Neptis kikideli (Boisduval, 1833)
- Neptis saclava (Boisduval, 1833)

==== Pseudacraeini ====
- Pseudacraea imerina imerina (Hewitson, 1865)
- Pseudacraea peyrierasi Collins, 1991
- Pseudacraea apaturoides (Felder & Felder, [1867])

=== Biblidinae ===
==== Eunicini ====
- Sevenia howensis (Staudinger, 1886)
- Sevenia madagascariensis (Boisduval, 1833)

==== Biblidini ====
- Eurytela dryope (Cramer, [1775])
- Eurytela narinda Ward, 1872
- Byblia anvatara anvatara (Boisduval, 1833)
- Neptidopsis fulgurata fulgurata (Boisduval, 1833)

=== Apaturinae ===
==== Apaturini ====
- Apaturopsis kilusa (Grose-Smith, 1891)
- Apaturopsis paulianii Viette, 1962

=== Cyrestinae ===
==== Cyrestini ====
- Cyrestis elegans Boisduval, 1833

=== Nymphalinae ===
==== Nymphalini ====
- Vanessa cardui (Linnaeus, 1758)
- Vanessa madegassorum (Aurivillius, [1899])

==== Junoniini ====
- Hypolimnas dexithea (Hewitson, 1863)
- Hypolimnas deceptor deludens Grose-Smith, 1891
- Hypolimnas drucei (Butler, 1874)
- Hypolimnas misippus (Linnaeus, 1764)
- Hypolimnas bolina (Linnaeus, 1758])
- Precis andremiaja (Boisduval, 1833)
- Precis eurodoce (Westwood, [1850])
- Salamis anteva (Ward, 1870)
- Protogoniomorpha duprei (Vinson, 1863)
- Junonia rhadama (Boisduval, 1833)
- Junonia goudotii (Boisduval, 1833)
- Junonia madagascariensis Guenée, 1865
- Junonia oenone (Boisduval, 1833)
- Junonia paris Trimen, 1887

== See also ==
- Geography of Madagascar
- Ecoregions of Madagascar
- Wildlife of Madagascar
- List of moths of Madagascar
