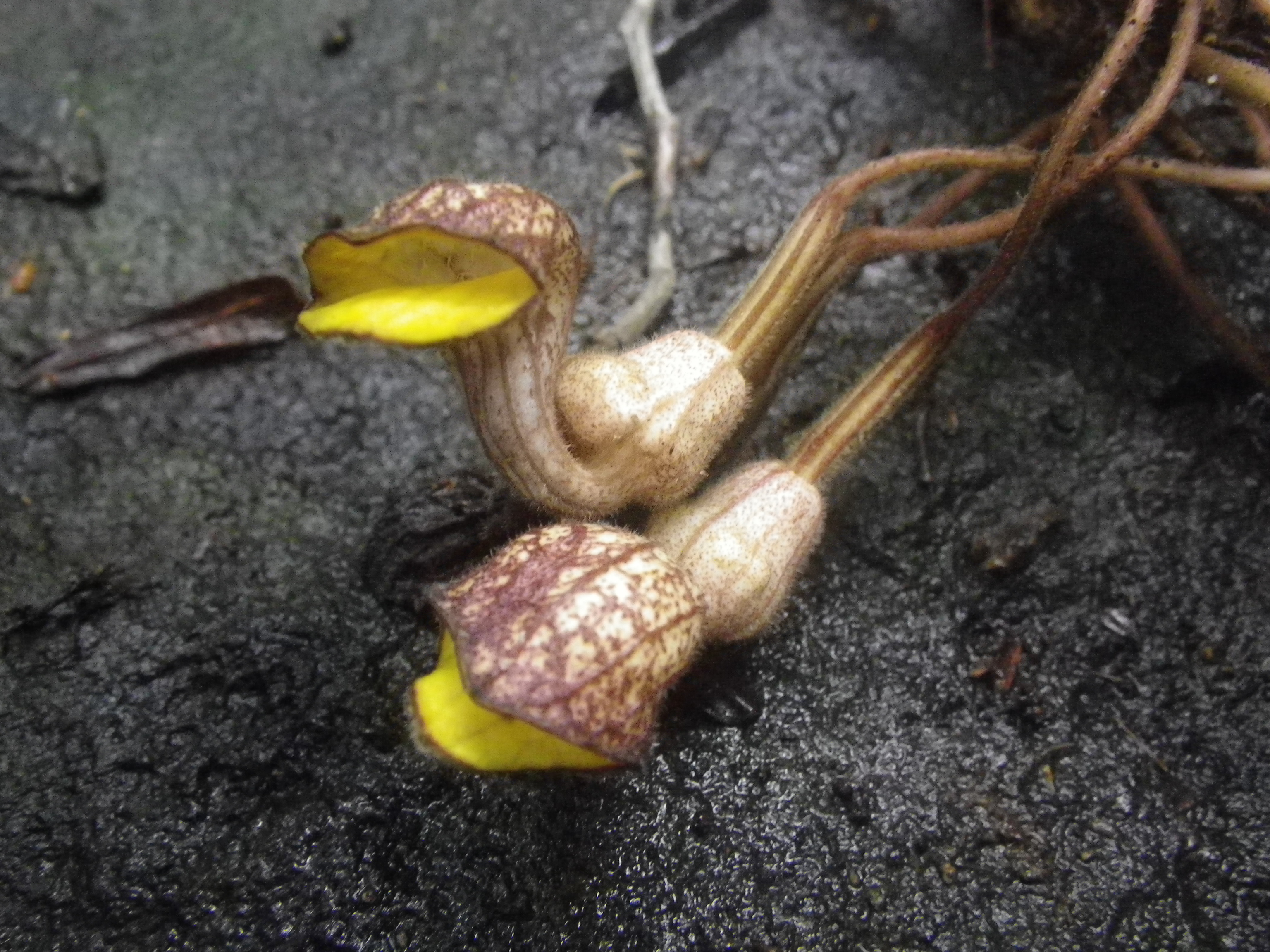
- Flowers

Scientific classification
- Kingdom: Plantae
- (unranked): Angiosperms
- (unranked): Magnoliids
- Order: Piperales
- Family: Aristolochiaceae
- Genus: Pararistolochia
- Species: P. enricoi

Binomial name
- Pararistolochia enricoi Luino, L.Gaut. & Callm. 2016

= Pararistolochia enricoi =

Species of flowering plant

Pararistolochia enricoi is an endemic Malagasy species of plant in the birthwort family, the only species belonging to the genus Pararistolochia within the island.

== Description ==
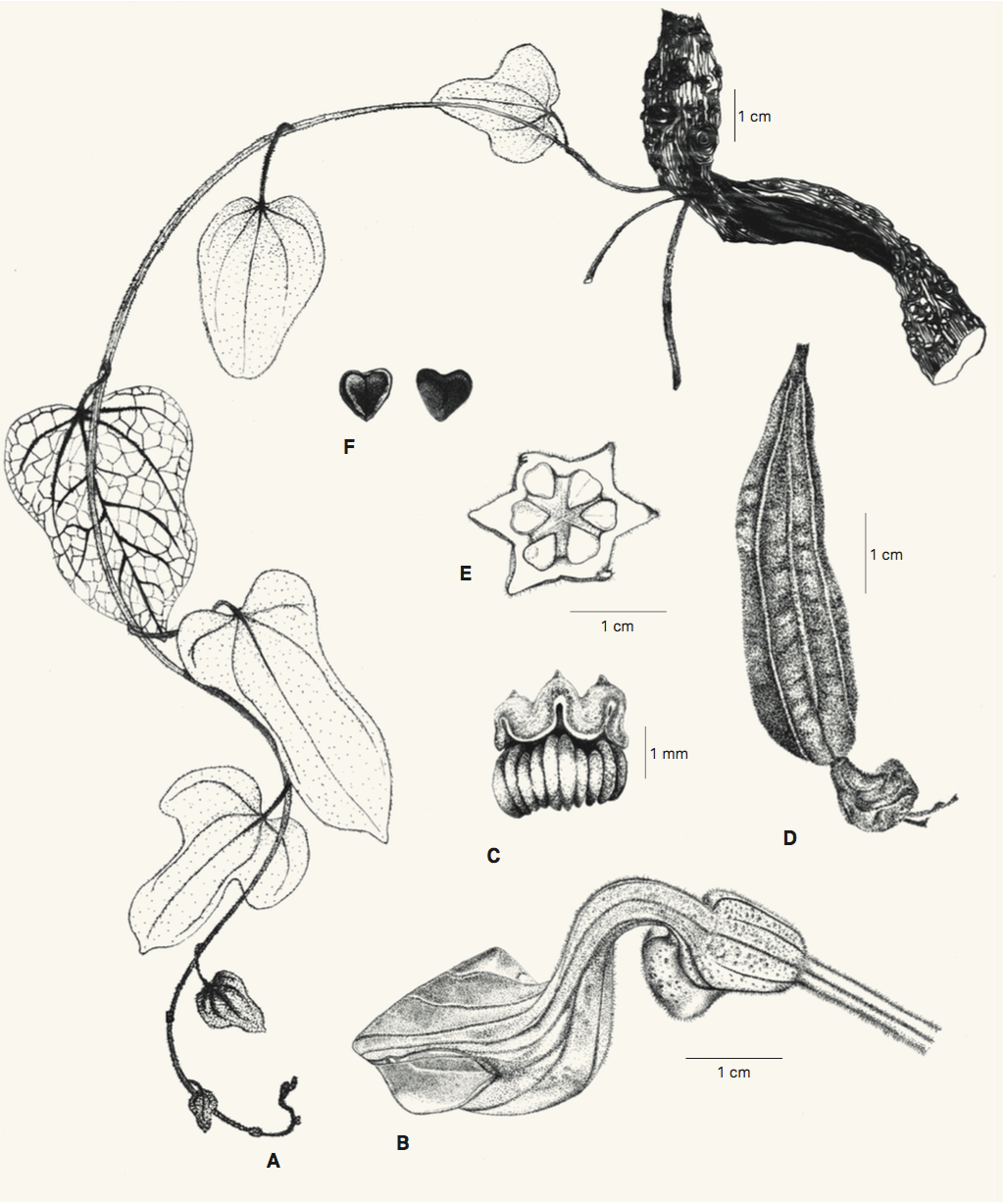
Pararistolochia enricoi (Drawings by S. Da Giau & G. Loza)

The species is a climbing and ground-sprawling, deciduous vine or liana. The stem can reach 15–25 m high and presents an 8-shaped cross section, typical of the genus. Leaves are 4–8 cm long, sparsely pubescent on both surfaces and variable in shape. Young shoots are attenuated, densely covered with golden hairs. The inflorescences arise from the corky stem, sometimes at ground level. Flowers are up to about 5 cm long and are covered by white hairs. Flower tubes are S-curved, funnel-shaped, enlarging throughout and constricted below the throat, which is bright sulphur-yellow; there are 2 lobes, triangular to well-rounded and purple. The utricle is punctuated with small red spots and purple-veined. The gynostemium i s2.7 mm long by 1.6 mm wide. There 6 yellow antheres, each consisting of 4 pollen sacs, and 6 green stigmatic lobes. The fruits are pendulous, cucumber-like, indehiscent, woody, 6-ribbed, up to 5.5 cm long, and brown when mature. The seeds are heart-shaped, convex and rough above, concave and smooth below, and 4 mm long by 4 mm wide.

== Taxonomy ==
The specific epithet enricoi isin honour of the first author's brother Enrico Luino who died in 2003 at the age of 21 and whom he credits with triggering in him the passion for tropical botany. As of May 2026, Plants of the World Online regarded the genus Pararistolochia as a synonym of Aristolochia, and the species P. enricoi as "unplaced".

== Distribution and ecology ==
Pararistolochia enricoi is only known from the eroded limestone formations ("Tsingy" in Malagasy) of Beanka in western Madagascar. Its ecology seems to be strongly related to the climax deciduous forest type, where it grows in shaded conditions. According to the collection period, anthesis takes place in November and fruits ripen between December and January. The plant is deciduous and leaves are absent during the dry season, generally from May to October.

== Pollination ==
The plant-insect interactions of Pararistolochia enricoi are still unknown. In western and southern Madagascar the monospecific butterfly genus Pharmacophagus antenor (Drury, 1773) (the only representative of the tribe Troidini in Madagascar) is known to be monophagous on Aristolochia albida. As documented by Parsons (1996b), the larvae of the troidine papilionid butterflies of the Australasian genus Ornithoptera feed primarily on Pararistolochia in the Australasian region. Considering the overlapping distributions of P. enricoi and Pharmacophagus antenor together with the known feeding habits of the latter, one could hypothesize that P. antenor larvae also feed on Pararistolochia enricoi (Parsons, 1996b).
