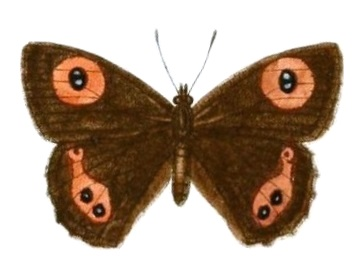

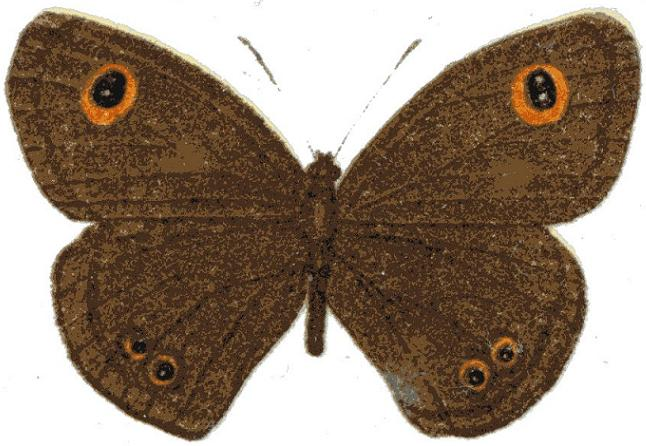
- Strabena tamatavae and S. vinsoni

Scientific classification
- Kingdom: Animalia
- Phylum: Arthropoda
- Class: Insecta
- Order: Lepidoptera
- Family: Nymphalidae
- Subfamily: Satyrinae
- Tribe: Satyrini
- Subtribe: Ypthimina
- Genus: Strabena; Mabille, 1877

Type species
- Strabena smithii Mabille, 1877

Diversity
- 37 species

Synonyms
- Callyphthima Butler, 1880

= Strabena =

Genus of butterflies

Strabena is an Afrotropical butterfly genus endemic to Madagascar from the subfamily Satyrinae in the family Nymphalidae.

== Species ==
- Strabena affinis Oberthür, 1916
- Strabena albivittula (Mabille, [1880])
- Strabena andilabe Paulian, 1951
- Strabena andriana Mabille, [1885]
- Strabena argyrina Mabille, 1878
- Strabena batesii (C. & R. Felder, [1867])
- Strabena cachani Paulian, 1950
- Strabena consobrina Oberthür, 1916
- Strabena consors Oberthür, 1916
- Strabena daphne Viette, 1971
- Strabena dyscola Mabille, 1880
- Strabena eros Viette, 1971
- Strabena excellens (Butler, 1885)
- Strabena germanus Oberthür, 1916
- Strabena goudoti (Mabille, [1885])
- Strabena ibitina (Ward, 1873)
- Strabena impar Oberthür, 1916
- Strabena isoalensis Paulian, 1951
- Strabena mabillei (Aurivillius, 1898)
- Strabena mandraka Paulian, 1951
- Strabena martini Oberthür, 1916
- Strabena modesta Oberthür, 1916
- Strabena modestissima Oberthür, 1916
- Strabena mopsus (Mabille, 1878)
- Strabena nepos Oberthür, 1916
- Strabena niveata (Butler, 1879)
- Strabena perrieri Paulian, 1951
- Strabena perroti Oberthür, 1916
- Strabena rakoto (Ward, 1870)
- Strabena smithii Mabille, 1877
- Strabena soror Oberthur, 1916
- Strabena sufferti (Aurivillius, 1898)
- Strabena tamatavae (Boisduval, 1833)
- Strabena triophthalma Mabille, [1885]
- Strabena tsaratananae Paulian, 1951
- Strabena vinsoni (Guenée, 1865)
- Strabena zanjuka Mabille, [1885]
