= Hovala =

Scientific classification
- Kingdom: Animalia
- Phylum: Arthropoda
- Class: Insecta
- Order: Lepidoptera
- Family: Hesperiidae
- Subfamily: Heteropterinae
- Genus: Hovala; Evans, 1937

Genus of butterflies

Hovala is a genus of skipper butterflies in the family Hesperiidae.

== Species ==
- Hovala amena (Grose-Smith, 1891)
- Hovala arota Evans, 1937
- Hovala dispar (Mabille, 1877)
- Hovala pardalina (Butler, 1879)
- Hovala saclavus (Mabille, 1891)
