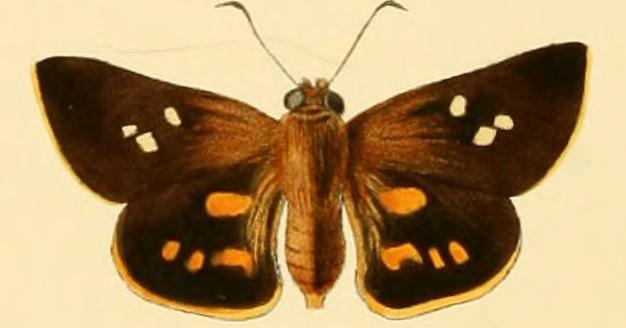
- Malaza carmides

Scientific classification
- Kingdom: Animalia
- Phylum: Arthropoda
- Class: Insecta
- Order: Lepidoptera
- Family: Hesperiidae
- Tribe: Erionotini
- Genus: Malaza; Mabille, 1904

Synonyms
- Manarina Mabille, 1904

= Malaza =

Genus of butterflies

Malaza is a genus of skippers in the family Hesperiidae.

== Species ==
- Malaza carmides (Hewitson, 1868)
- Malaza empyreus (Mabille, 1878)
- Malaza fastuosus (Mabille, 1884)
