= Strabena cachani =

Scientific classification
- Kingdom: Animalia
- Phylum: Arthropoda
- Class: Insecta
- Order: Lepidoptera
- Family: Nymphalidae
- Genus: Strabena
- Species: S. cachani

Binomial name
- Strabena cachani Paulian, 1950

Synonyms
- Strabena albiviltuloides Paulian, 1951

Species of butterfly

Strabena cachani is a butterfly in the family Nymphalidae. It is found on Madagascar. The habitat consists of forests.
