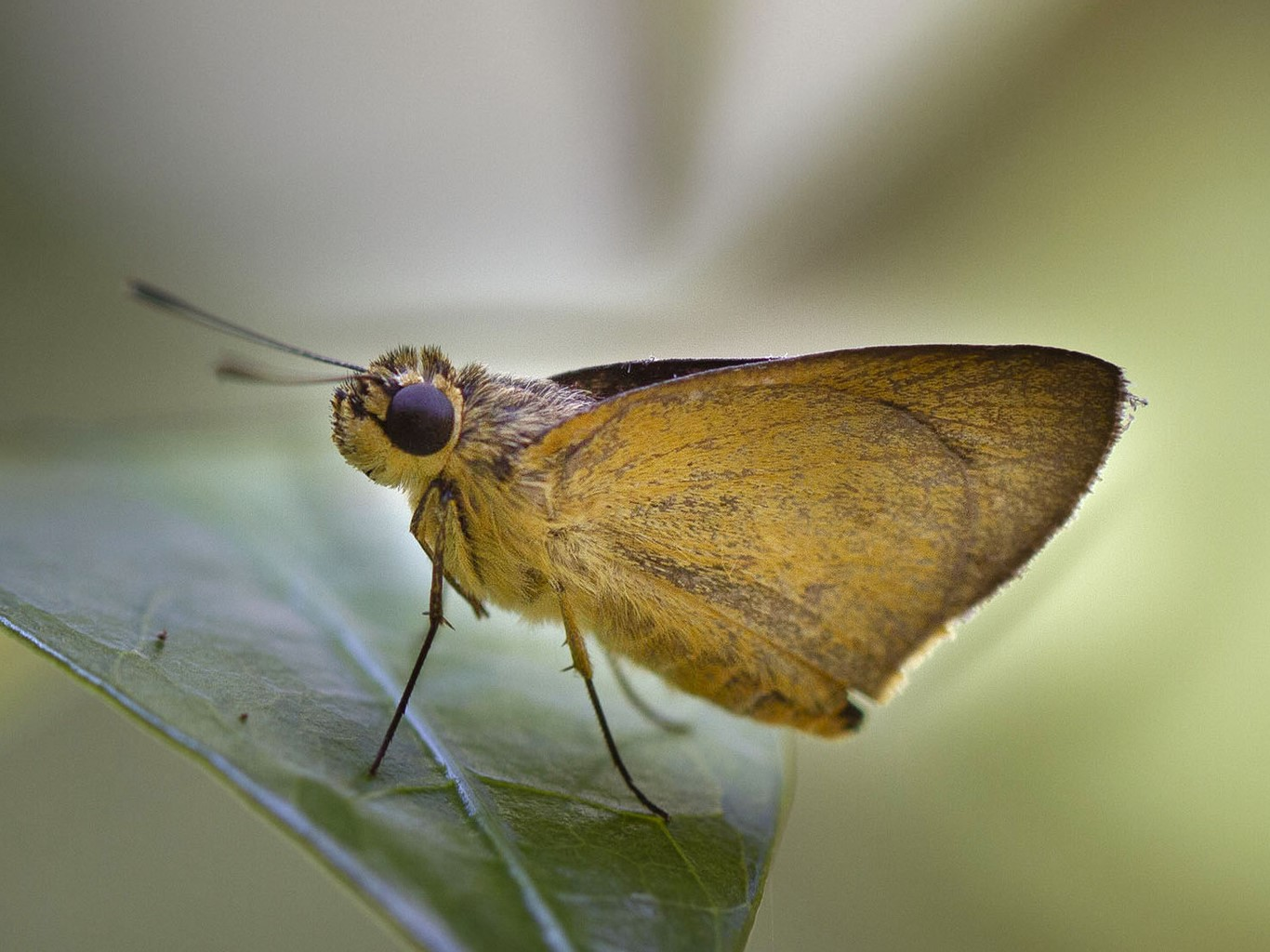

Scientific classification
- Kingdom: Animalia
- Phylum: Arthropoda
- Class: Insecta
- Order: Lepidoptera
- Family: Hesperiidae
- Tribe: Astictopterini
- Genus: Galerga; Mabille, 1898

= Galerga =

Genus of butterflies

Galerga is a genus of skipper butterflies in the family Hesperiidae.

== Species ==
The following species are recognised in the genus Galerga:

- Galerga ellipsis (Saalmüller, 1884)
- Galerga fito Evans, 1937
- Galerga hyposticta Mabille, 1898
