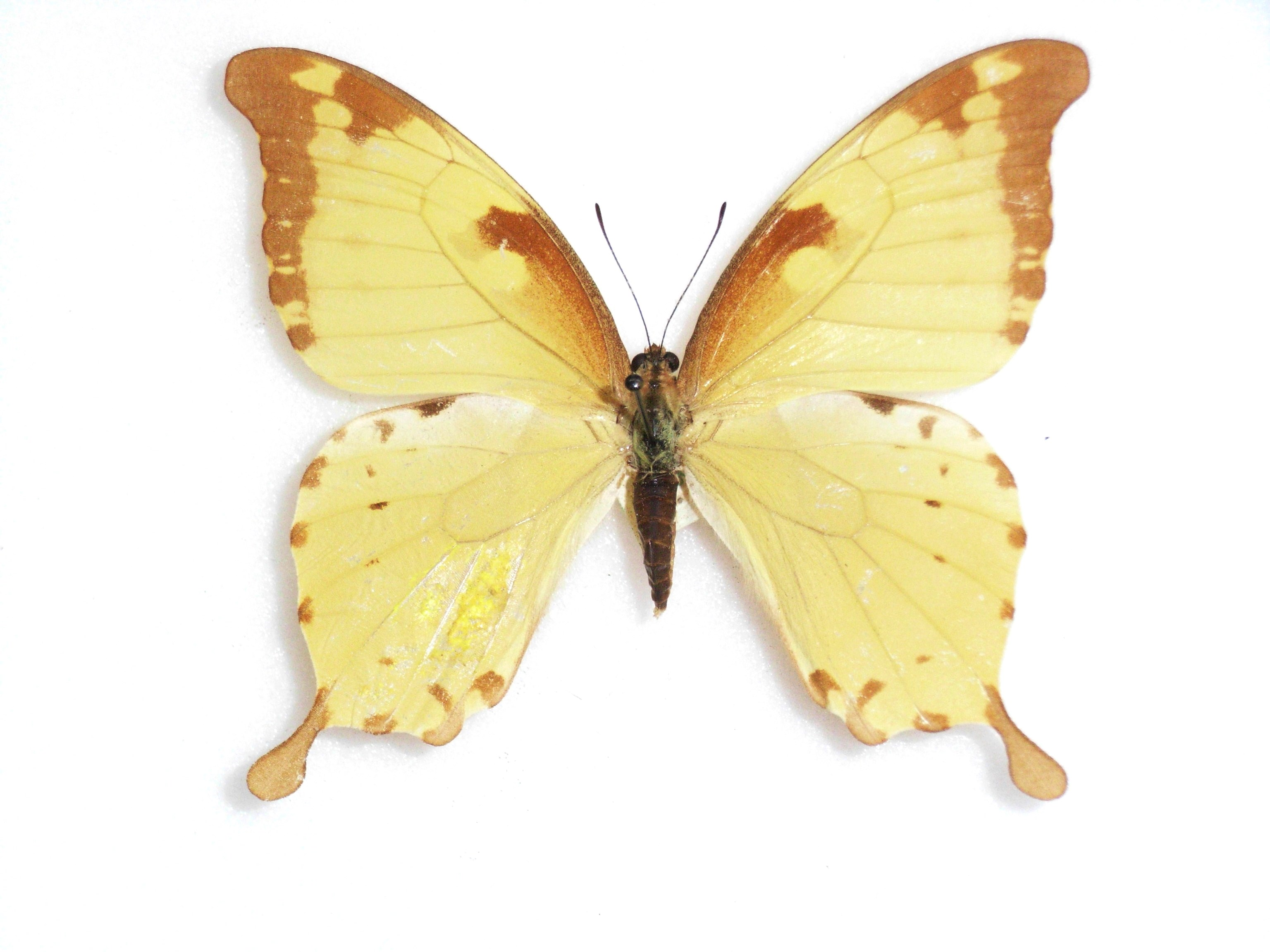

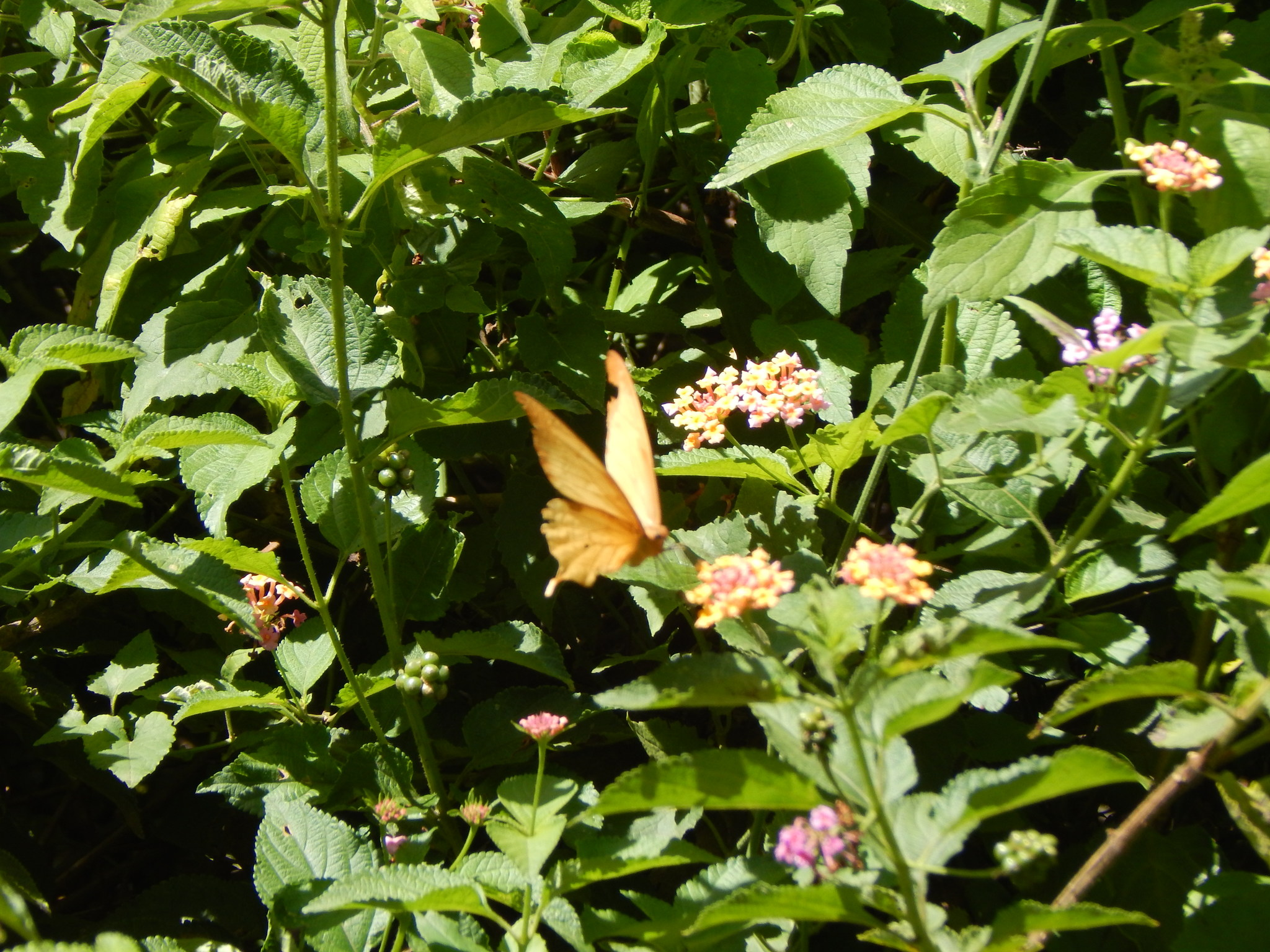

Scientific classification
- Kingdom: Animalia
- Phylum: Arthropoda
- Clade: Pancrustacea
- Class: Insecta
- Order: Lepidoptera
- Family: Papilionidae
- Genus: Papilio
- Species: P. nobilis

Binomial name
- Papilio nobilis Rogenhofer, 1891

Synonyms
- Princeps nobilis; Papilio pringlei Sharpe, 1894; Papilio nobilis f. mariabonaparte Bryk, 1929; Papilio nobilis f. nobilissima Bryk, 1929; Papilio nobilis pallidus Stoneham, 1931; Papilio nobilis ab. josetta Smart, 1976; Papilio nobilis leroyi Berger, 1950

= Papilio nobilis =

Species of butterfly

Papilio nobilis, the noble swallowtail, is a butterfly of the family Papilionidae. It is found in Africa.

The larvae feed on Warburgia ugandensis.

== Taxonomy ==
Papilio nobilis is a member of the oribazus species group. The clade members are:

- Papilio oribazus Boisduval, 1836
- Papilio epiphorbas Boisduval, 1833
- Papilio nobilis Rogenhofer, 1891

== Subspecies ==
- Papilio nobilis nobilis (highlands of Kenya, Lake Victoria, eastern Uganda, north-western Tanzania)
- Papilio nobilis didingensis Carpenter, 1928 (southern Sudan)
- Papilio nobilis crippsianus Stoneham, 1936 . (Congo Republic, western Uganda, western Kenya, north-western Tanzania)
- Papilio nobilis mpanda Kielland, 1990 (western Tanzania)
