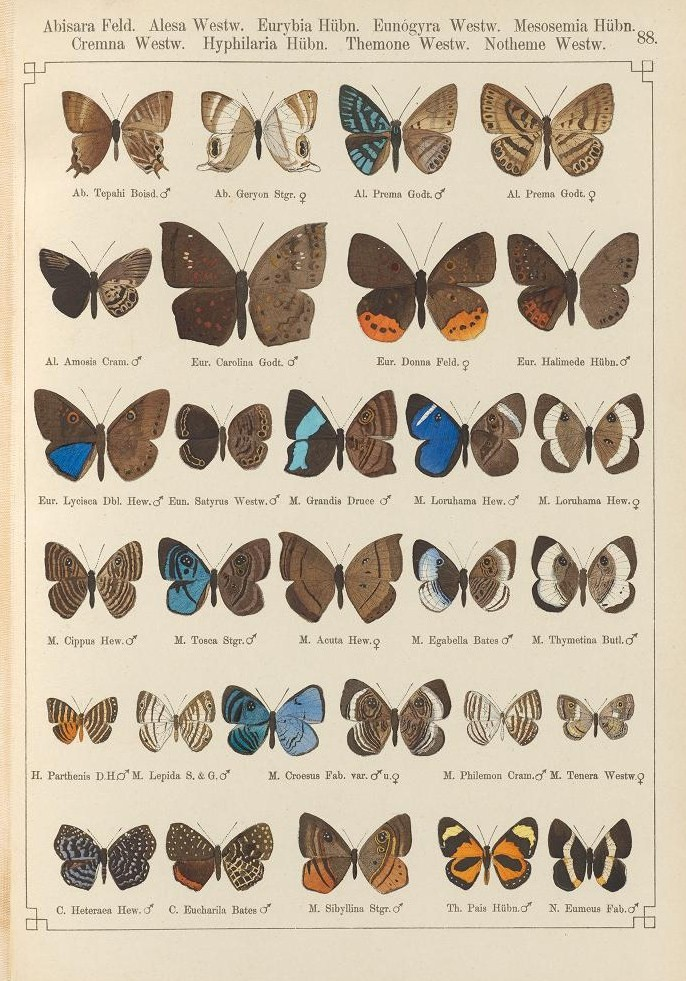
- Saribia tepahi as Abisara tepahi top left

Scientific classification
- Kingdom: Animalia
- Phylum: Arthropoda
- Class: Insecta
- Order: Lepidoptera
- Family: Riodinidae
- Subfamily: Nemeobiinae
- Tribe: Nemeobiini
- Subtribe: Abisarina
- Genus: Saribia; Butler, 1878

Synonyms
- Sabiria Röber, 1892

= Saribia =

Genus of butterflies

Saribia is a genus of butterflies in the family Riodinidae.

== Species ==
- Saribia decaryi (Le Cerf, 1922)
- Saribia ochracea Riley, 1932
- Saribia perroti Riley, 1932
- Saribia tepahi (Boisduval, 1833)
