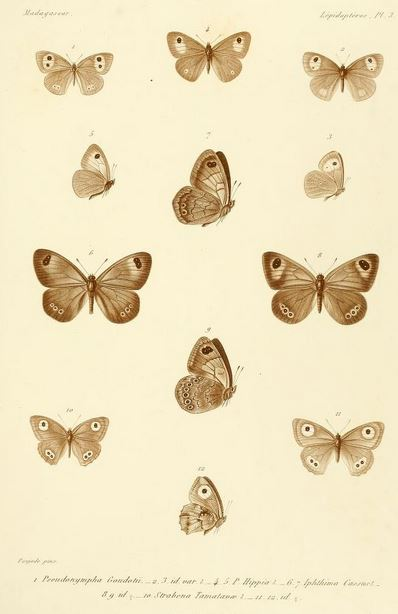

Scientific classification
- Kingdom: Animalia
- Phylum: Arthropoda
- Class: Insecta
- Order: Lepidoptera
- Family: Nymphalidae
- Genus: Strabena
- Species: S. goudoti

Binomial name
- Strabena goudoti (Mabille, [1885])

Synonyms
- Pseudonympha goudoti Mabille, [1885]

= Strabena goudoti =

Species of butterfly

Strabena goudoti is a butterfly in the family Nymphalidae. It is found on Madagascar. The habitat consists of transformed grasslands.
