= Strabena modesta =

Scientific classification
- Kingdom: Animalia
- Phylum: Arthropoda
- Class: Insecta
- Order: Lepidoptera
- Family: Nymphalidae
- Genus: Strabena
- Species: S. modesta

Binomial name
- Strabena modesta Oberthür, 1916

Species of butterfly

Strabena modesta is a butterfly in the family Nymphalidae. It is found in Madagascar.
