= Strabena mabillei =

Scientific classification
- Kingdom: Animalia
- Phylum: Arthropoda
- Class: Insecta
- Order: Lepidoptera
- Family: Nymphalidae
- Genus: Strabena
- Species: S. mabillei

Binomial name
- Strabena mabillei (Aurivillius, 1899)

Synonyms
- Ypthima mabillei Aurivillius, 1899; Strabena aurivilliusi d’Abrera, 1980

Species of butterfly

Strabena mabillei is a butterfly in the family Nymphalidae. It is found on Madagascar. The habitat consists of forests.
