= Hovala arota =

Scientific classification
- Kingdom: Animalia
- Phylum: Arthropoda
- Class: Insecta
- Order: Lepidoptera
- Family: Hesperiidae
- Genus: Hovala
- Species: H. arota

Binomial name
- Hovala arota Evans, 1937

Species of butterfly

Hovala arota is a butterfly in the family Hesperiidae. It is found on Madagascar. The habitat consists of forests.
