= Malaza empyreus =

Scientific classification
- Kingdom: Animalia
- Phylum: Arthropoda
- Clade: Pancrustacea
- Class: Insecta
- Order: Lepidoptera
- Family: Hesperiidae
- Genus: Malaza
- Species: M. empyreus

Binomial name
- Malaza empyreus (Mabille, 1878)

Synonyms
- Cyclopides empyreus Mabille, 1878

Species of butterfly

Malaza empyreus is a butterfly in the family Hesperiidae. It is found on Madagascar (Ile Sainte Marie and Sakavalona). The habitat consists of forests.
