= Strabena batesii =

- As frater Oberthur (d)

Scientific classification
- Kingdom: Animalia
- Phylum: Arthropoda
- Clade: Pancrustacea
- Class: Insecta
- Order: Lepidoptera
- Family: Nymphalidae
- Genus: Strabena
- Species: S. batesii

Binomial name
- Strabena batesii (Felder & Felder, 1867)

Synonyms
- Yphthima batesii Felder & Felder, 1867; Strabena frater Oberthür, 1916

Species of butterfly

Strabena batesii is a butterfly in the family Nymphalidae. It is found on Madagascar. The habitat consists of forests.
