= Strabena mandraka =

Scientific classification
- Kingdom: Animalia
- Phylum: Arthropoda
- Class: Insecta
- Order: Lepidoptera
- Family: Nymphalidae
- Genus: Strabena
- Species: S. mandraka

Binomial name
- Strabena mandraka Paulian, 1951

Species of butterfly

Strabena mandraka is a butterfly in the family Nymphalidae. It is found on Madagascar. The habitat consists of forests.
