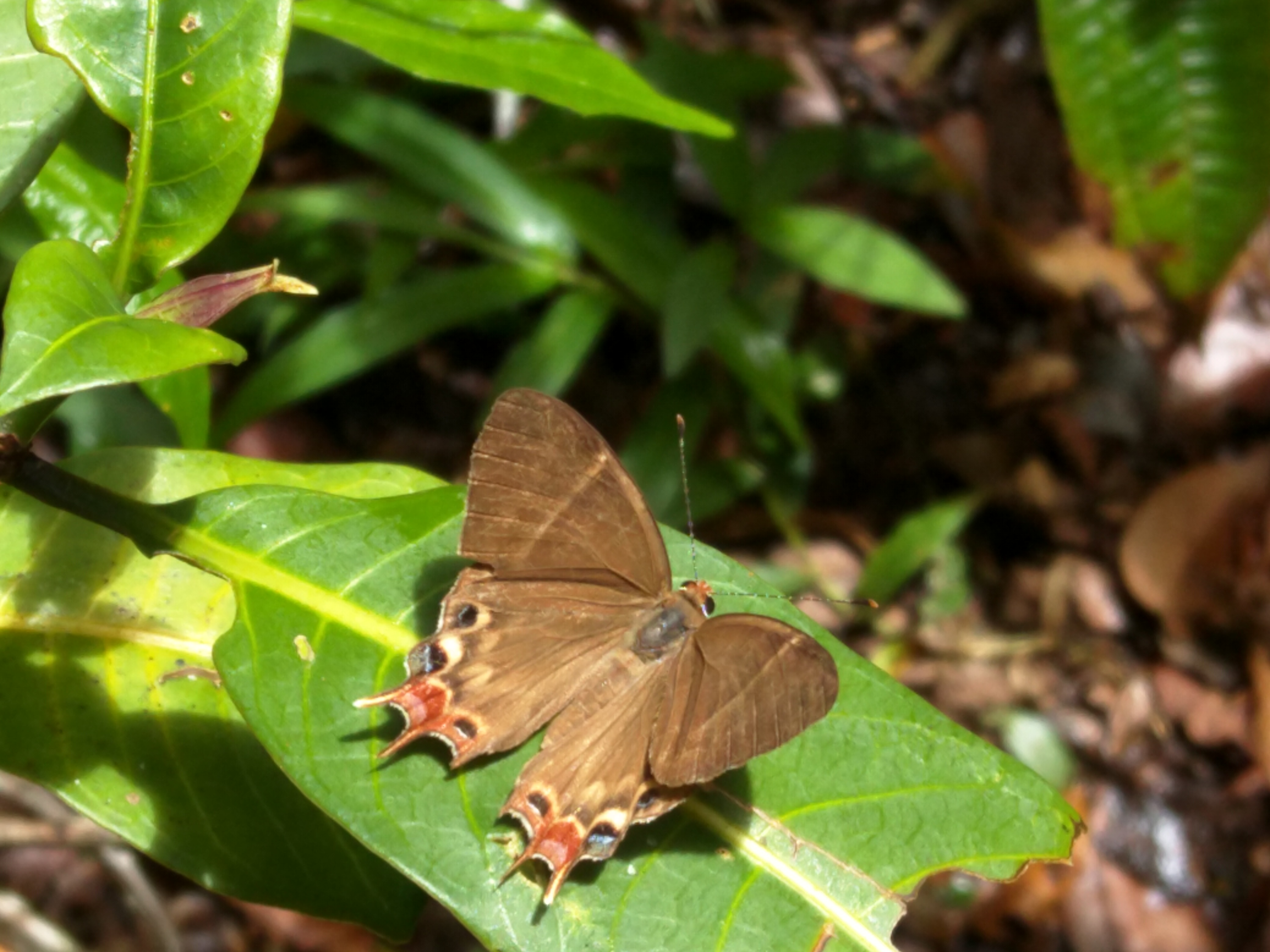

Scientific classification
- Kingdom: Animalia
- Phylum: Arthropoda
- Class: Insecta
- Order: Lepidoptera
- Family: Riodinidae
- Genus: Saribia
- Species: S. perroti

Binomial name
- Saribia perroti Riley, 1932

Synonyms
- Saribia perroti fiana Riley, 1932

= Saribia perroti =

Species of butterfly

Saribia perroti is a butterfly in the family Riodinidae. It is found on Madagascar. The habitat consists of forests.
