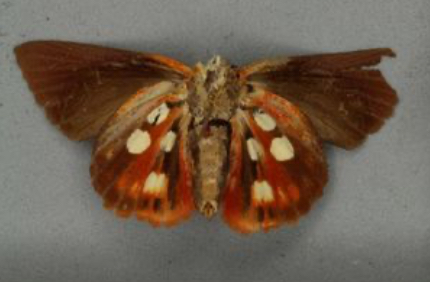

Scientific classification
- Domain: Eukaryota
- Kingdom: Animalia
- Phylum: Arthropoda
- Class: Insecta
- Order: Lepidoptera
- Family: Hesperiidae
- Genus: Malaza
- Species: M. fastuosus

Binomial name
- Malaza fastuosus (Mabille, 1884)

Synonyms
- Trapezites fastuosus Mabille, 1884

= Malaza fastuosus =

Species of butterfly

Malaza fastuosus is a butterfly in the family Hesperiidae. It is found on Madagascar (the west coast, Fito, Rogez Forest).
