= Strabena tsaratananae =

Scientific classification
- Kingdom: Animalia
- Phylum: Arthropoda
- Class: Insecta
- Order: Lepidoptera
- Family: Nymphalidae
- Genus: Strabena
- Species: S. tsaratananae

Binomial name
- Strabena tsaratananae Paulian, 1951

Species of butterfly

Strabena tsaratananae is a butterfly in the family Nymphalidae. It is found on Madagascar, where it is known from the Sambirano River area. Forests are the typical habitat of Strabena tsaratananae.
