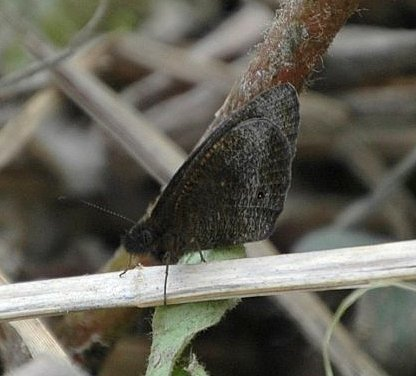

Scientific classification
- Kingdom: Animalia
- Phylum: Arthropoda
- Class: Insecta
- Order: Lepidoptera
- Family: Nymphalidae
- Genus: Strabena
- Species: S. rakoto

Binomial name
- Strabena rakoto (Ward, 1870)

Synonyms
- Erebia rakoto Ward, 1870

= Strabena rakoto =

Species of butterfly

Strabena rakoto is a butterfly in the family Nymphalidae. It is found in Madagascar. The habitat consists of forest margins, transformed grassland and anthropogenic environments.
