= National Zoological Museum of China =

Museum in Beijing, China

Coordinates: 40°00′04″N 116°22′30″E

The National Zoological Museum of China is located on the campus of the Chinese Academy of Sciences in Beijing in the Chaoyang District. It is the largest zoological museum in China. It has three floors of exhibits that surround a central exhibit area that contains a large hanging whale skeleton. The exhibits consists largely of mounted bird, mammal, and insects. The butterfly collection is quite large in particular.

== Exhibits ==
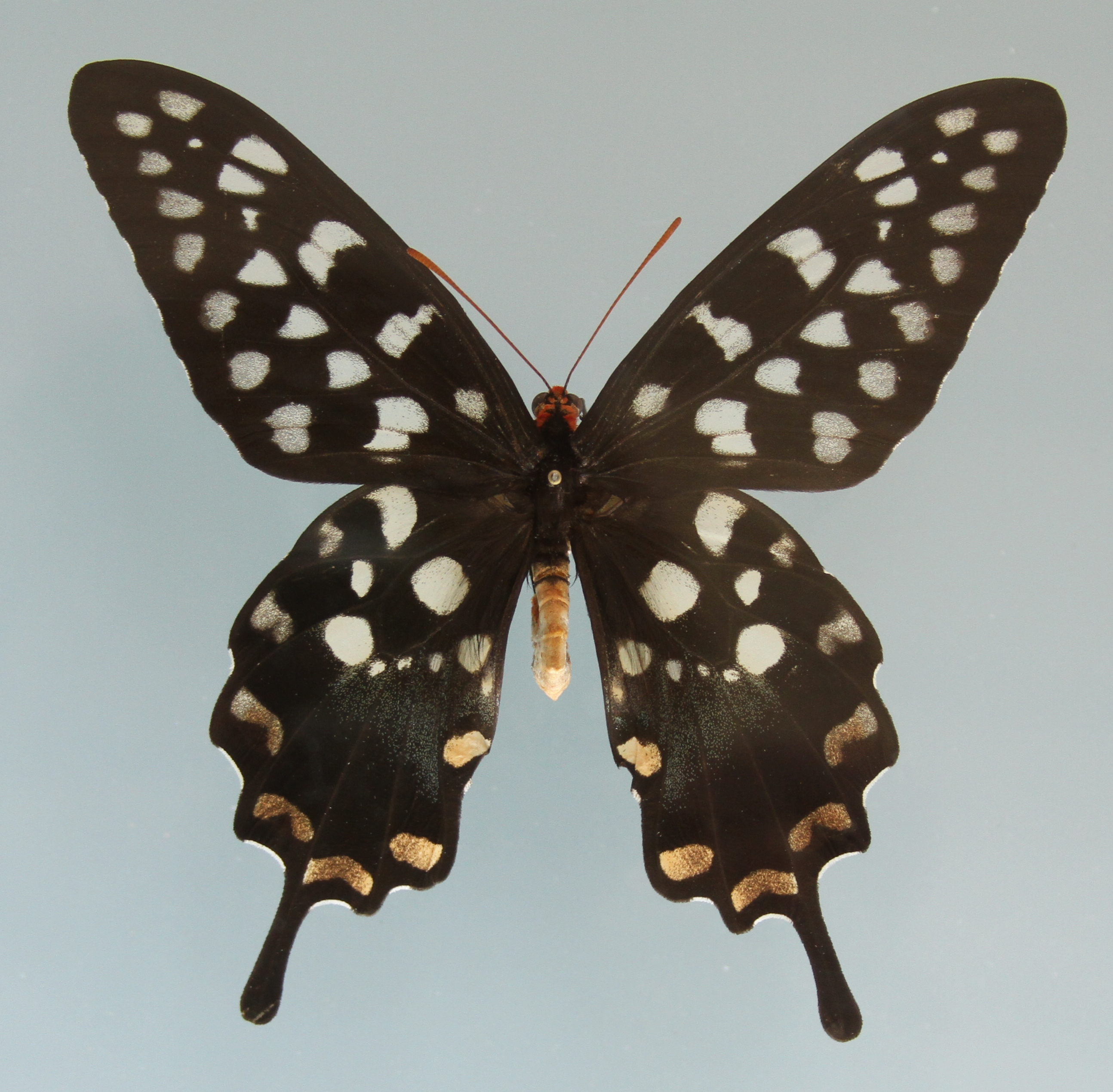
Pharmacophagus antenor (drury) specimen at the National Zoological Museum of China.

The nine showrooms are categorized by the following: Insect Exhibition Pavilion, Insect Hall and Butterfly Hall, Invertebrate Exhibition Pavilion and Invertebrate Hall, Fish and Amphibian Exhibition Pavilion, Animal and Hominid Hall, Bird Exhibition Pavilion, Bird Hall, Mammal Exhibition Pavilion, Endangered Animals Hall, Digital Specimen Exhibition Pavilion, Animal Diversity and Evolution Hall.

== See also ==
- Kunming Institute of Zoology
