= Strabena niveata =

Scientific classification
- Kingdom: Animalia
- Phylum: Arthropoda
- Class: Insecta
- Order: Lepidoptera
- Family: Nymphalidae
- Genus: Strabena
- Species: S. niveata

Binomial name
- Strabena niveata (Butler, 1879)

Synonyms
- Ypthima niveata Butler, 1879; Strabena corynetes Mabille, 1885; Strabena propinqua Oberthür, 1916; Strabena corynetes var. rectilineata Oberthür, 1916

Species of butterfly

Strabena niveata is a butterfly in the family Nymphalidae. It is found in Madagascar. The habitat consists of forests.
