= Strabena albivittula =

Scientific classification
- Kingdom: Animalia
- Phylum: Arthropoda
- Class: Insecta
- Order: Lepidoptera
- Family: Nymphalidae
- Genus: Strabena
- Species: S. albivittula

Binomial name
- Strabena albivittula (Mabille, 1880)

Synonyms
- Satyrus albivittula Mabille, 1880

Species of butterfly

Strabena albivittula is a butterfly in the family Nymphalidae. It is found on Madagascar.
