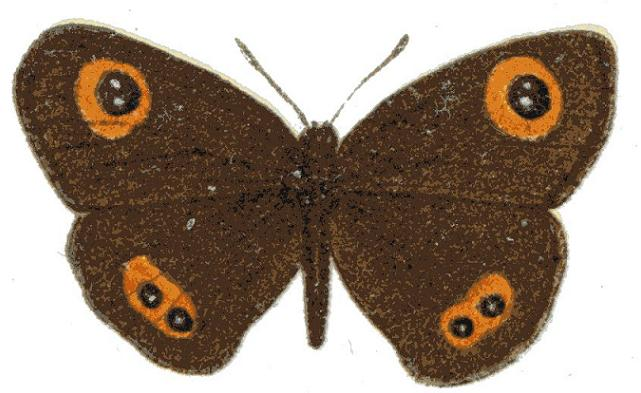

Scientific classification
- Kingdom: Animalia
- Phylum: Arthropoda
- Class: Insecta
- Order: Lepidoptera
- Family: Nymphalidae
- Genus: Strabena
- Species: S. dyscola

Binomial name
- Strabena dyscola Mabille, 1880

= Strabena dyscola =

Species of butterfly

Strabena dyscola is a butterfly in the family Nymphalidae. It is found on Madagascar.
