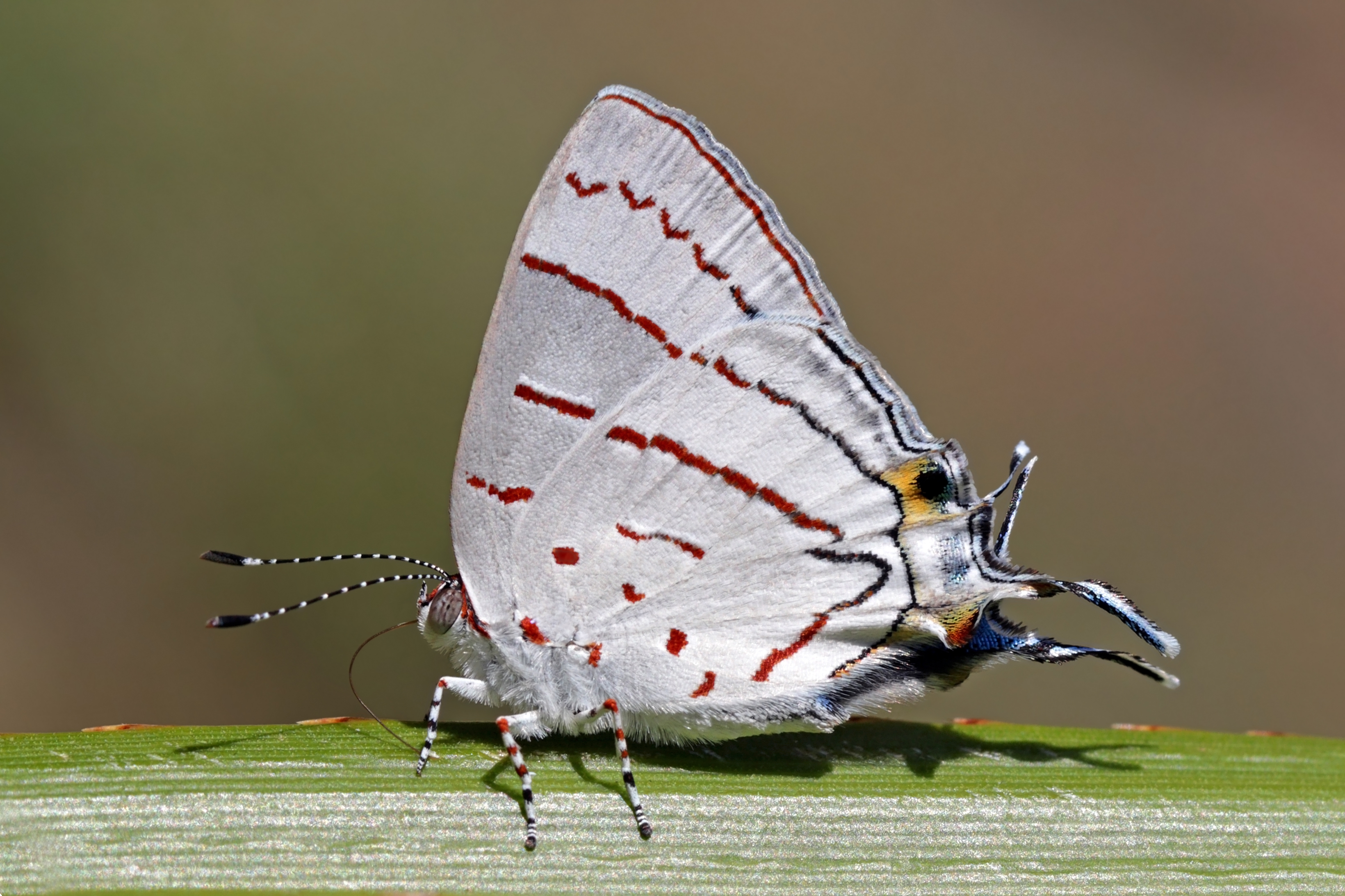
- Isalo National Park, Madagascar

Scientific classification
- Kingdom: Animalia
- Phylum: Arthropoda
- Class: Insecta
- Order: Lepidoptera
- Family: Lycaenidae
- Genus: Hemiolaus
- Species: H. cobaltina

Binomial name
- Hemiolaus cobaltina (Aurivillius, 1899)

Synonyms
- Hypolycaena cobaltina Aurivillius, 1899; Iolaus (Hemiolaus) cobaltina; Hypolycaena margites Mabille, 1899; Hypolycaena cobaltina f. varnieri Stempffer, 1942; Hemiolaus varnieri Stempffer & Bennett, 1958

= Hemiolaus cobaltina =

Species of butterfly

Hemiolaus cobaltina is a butterfly in the family Lycaenidae. It is found in Madagascar.
