= Strabena smithii =

Scientific classification
- Kingdom: Animalia
- Phylum: Arthropoda
- Class: Insecta
- Order: Lepidoptera
- Family: Nymphalidae
- Genus: Strabena
- Species: S. smithii

Binomial name
- Strabena smithii Mabille, 1877

Synonyms
- Strabena smithi; Pseudonympha wardii Butler, 1879

Species of butterfly

Strabena smithii is a butterfly in the family Nymphalidae. It is found in Madagascar. The habitat consists of forest and forest margins.
