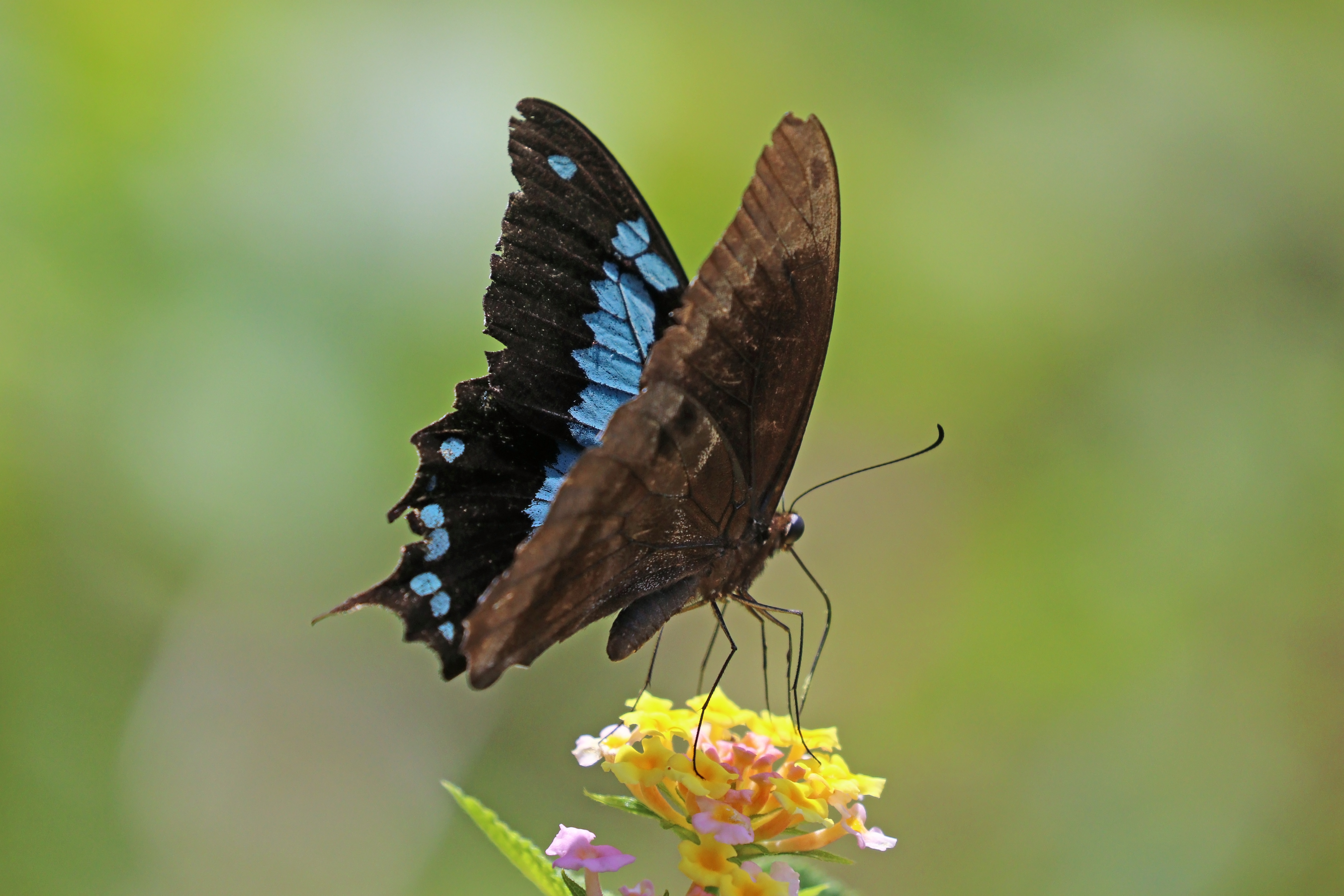
- Analamazaotra Special Reserve, Madagascar

Scientific classification
- Kingdom: Animalia
- Phylum: Arthropoda
- Clade: Pancrustacea
- Class: Insecta
- Order: Lepidoptera
- Family: Papilionidae
- Genus: Papilio
- Species: P. oribazus

Binomial name
- Papilio oribazus Boisduval, 1836

= Papilio oribazus =

Species of butterfly

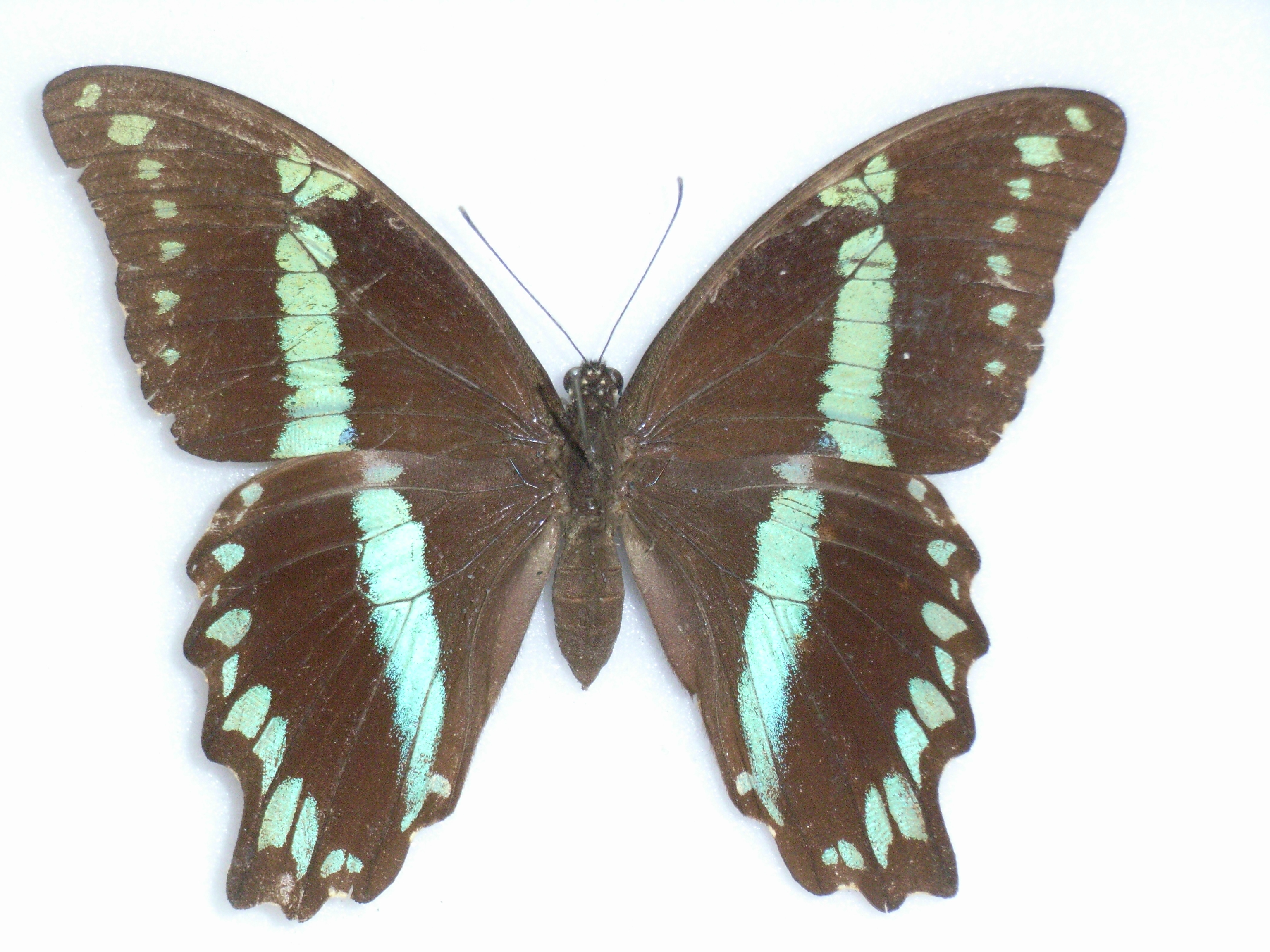
female

Papilio oribazus is a swallowtail butterfly from the genus Papilio that is found in eastern Madagascar. The species was first described by Jean Baptiste Boisduval in 1836. The habitat consists of forests and forest margins.

== Taxonomy ==
Papilio oribazus is the nominal member of the oribazus species group. The clade members are:

- Papilio oribazus Boisduval, 1836
- Papilio epiphorbas Boisduval, 1833
- Papilio nobilis Rogenhofer, 1891
