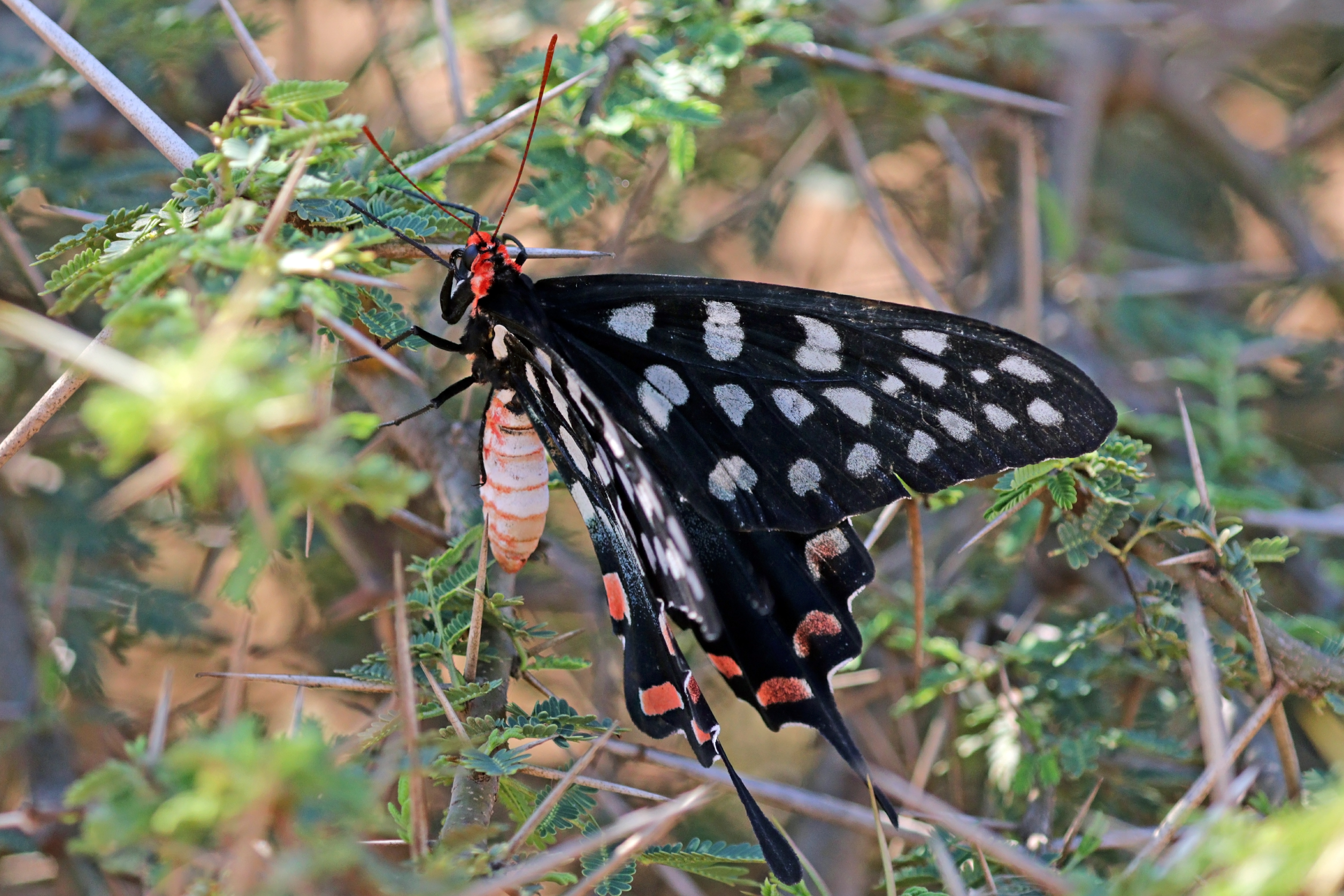
- Near Toliara, Madagascar

Scientific classification
- Kingdom: Animalia
- Phylum: Arthropoda
- Clade: Pancrustacea
- Class: Insecta
- Order: Lepidoptera
- Family: Papilionidae
- Subfamily: Papilioninae
- Tribe: Troidini
- Genus: Pharmacophagus; Haase, 1891
- Species: P. antenor

Binomial name
- Pharmacophagus antenor (Drury, 1775)

Synonyms
- Papilio antenor Drury, [1773]; Papilio antenor var. gehleni Le Moult, 1912; Papilio antenor var. albomaculata Le Moult, 1912; Papilio antenor f. niger Diehl, 1962

= Pharmacophagus =

Genus of butterflies

Pharmacophagus antenor, the Madagascar giant swallowtail, is a butterfly from the family Papilionidae. As the common name implies, it is large (12– to 14-cm wingspan) and endemic to Madagascar. It is the only species in the genus Pharmacophagus.

The larvae feed on Aristolochia acuminata and Quisqualis grandidieri.

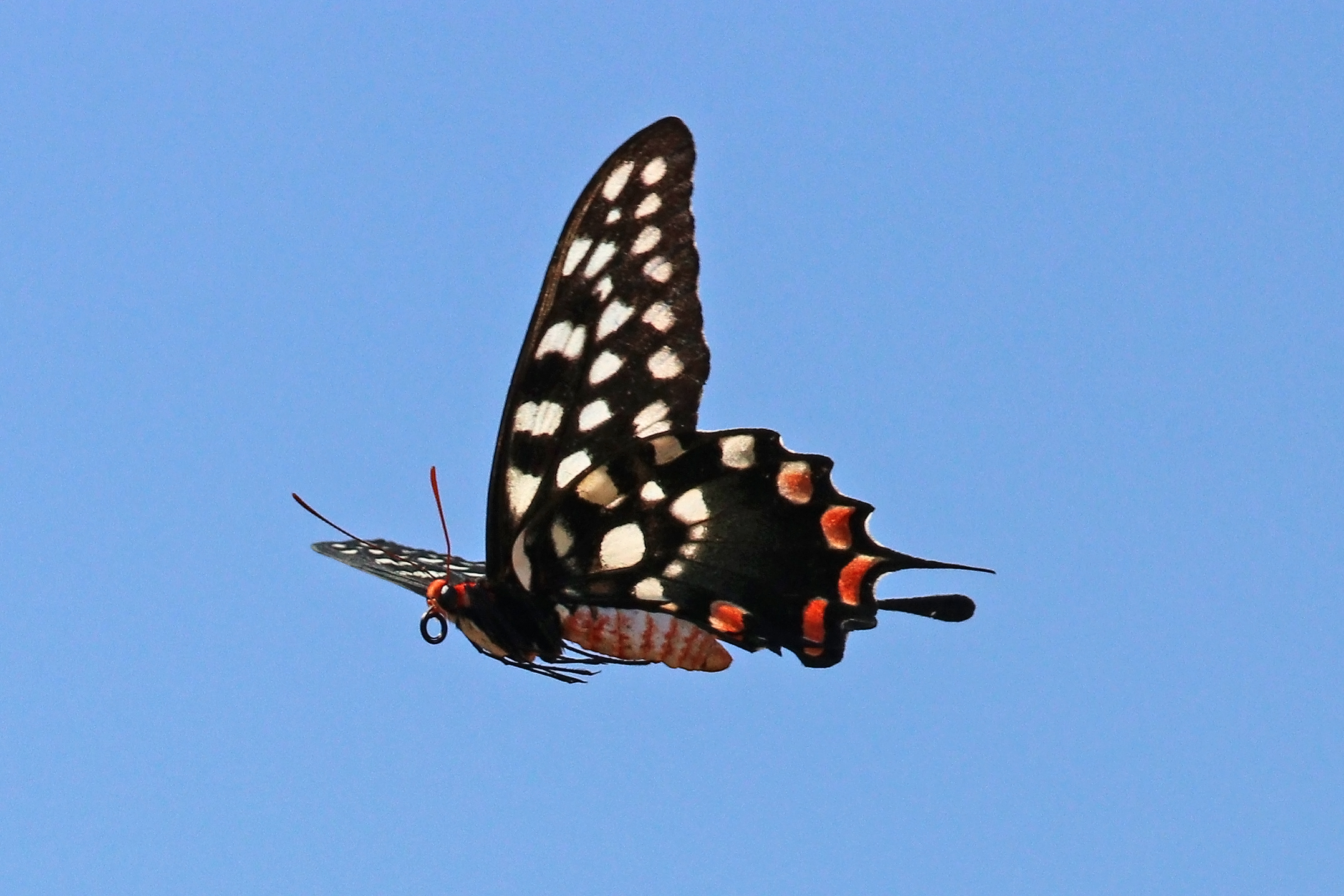
Near Toliara, Madagascar

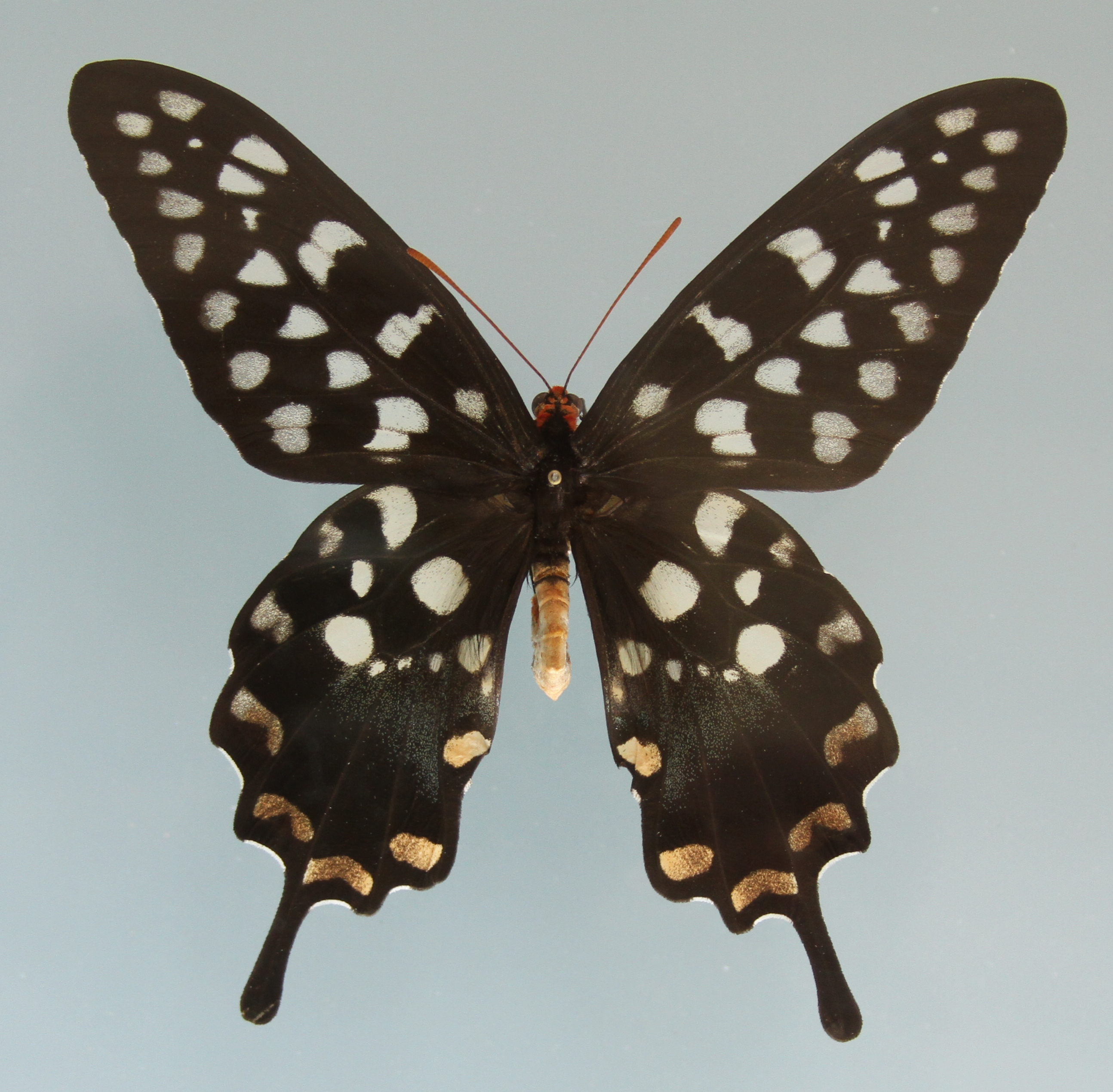
Specimen at the National Zoological Museum of China

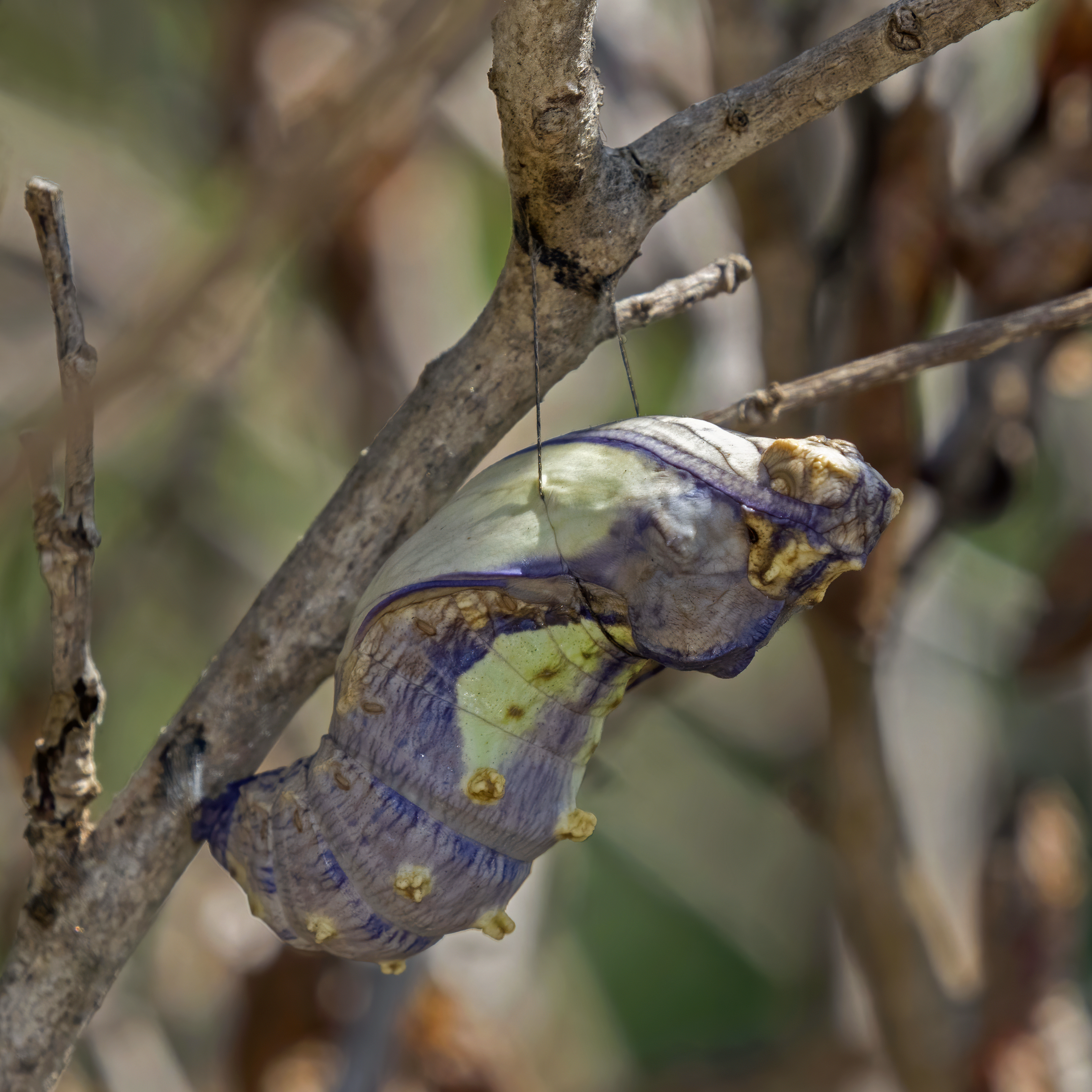
chrysalis, Isalo National Park, Madagascar

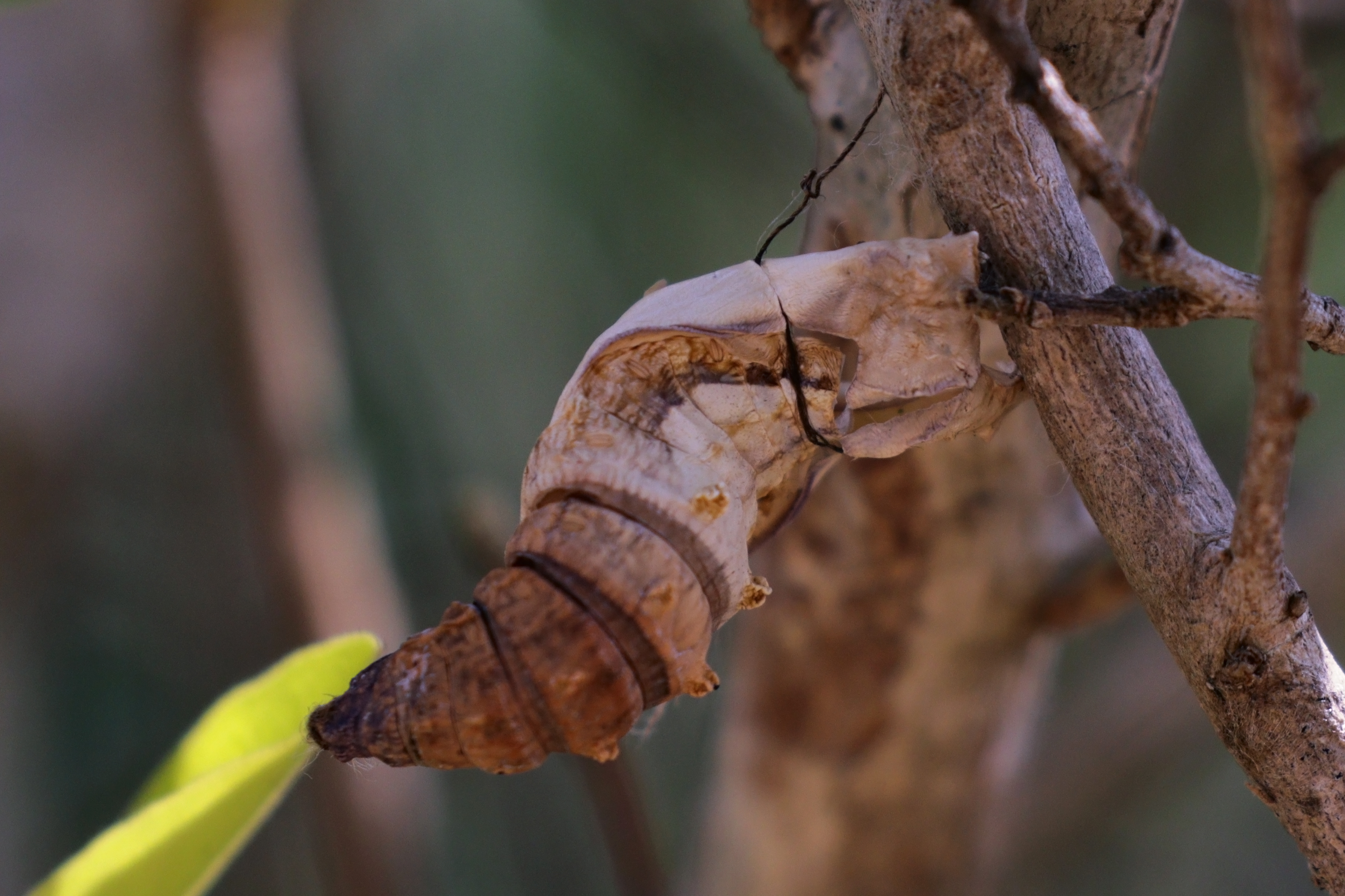
empty chrysalis, Isalo National Park, Madagascar

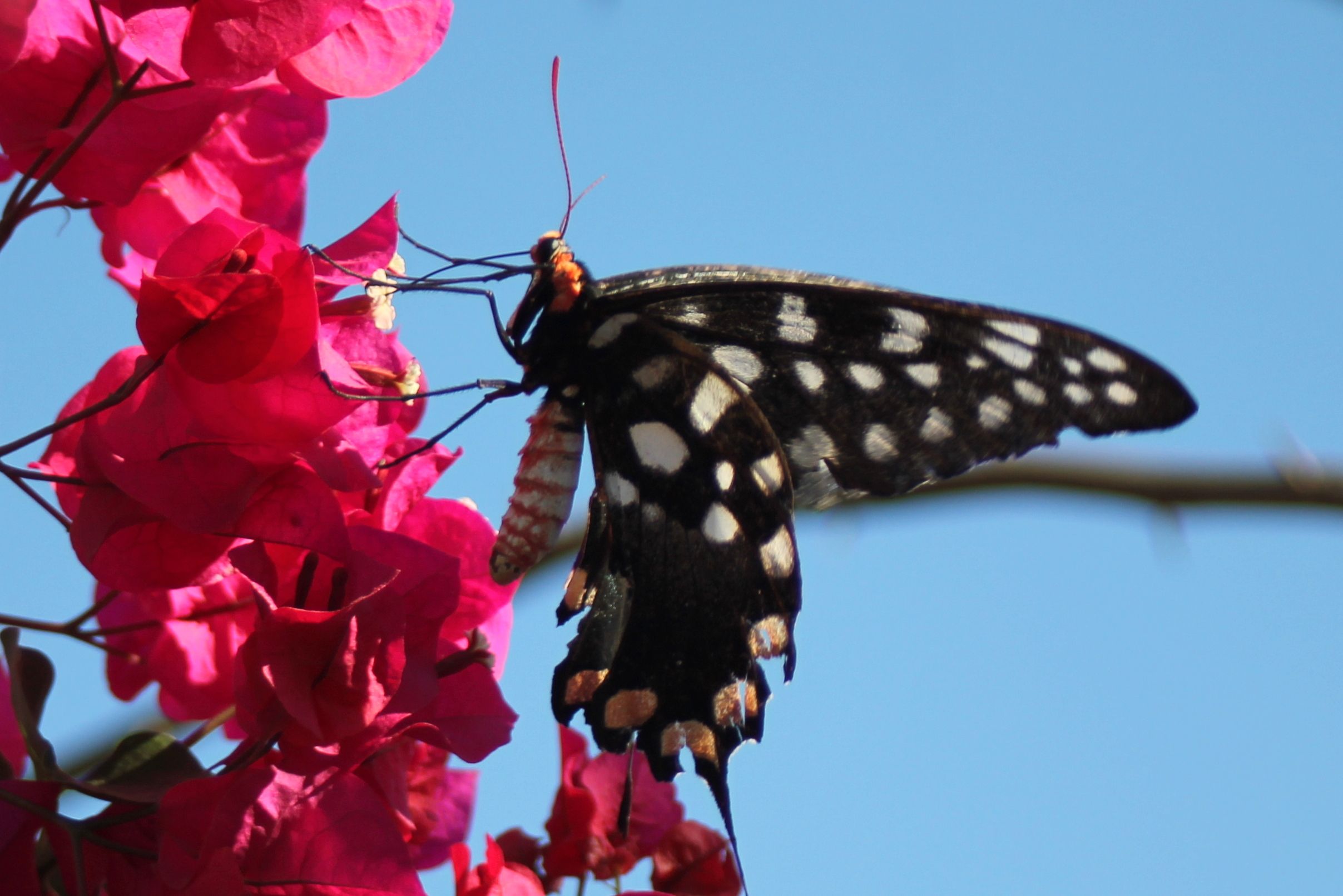
Feeding
