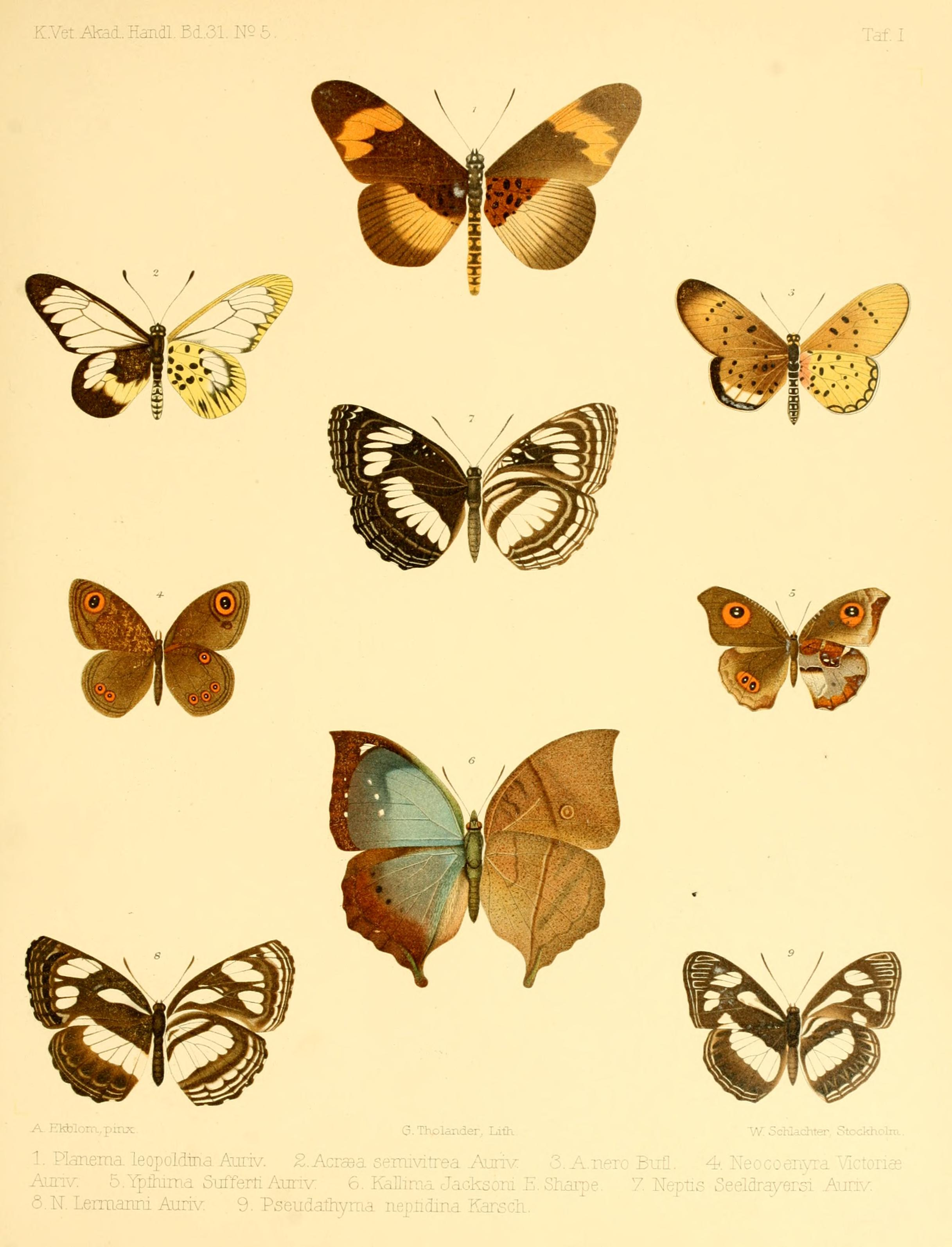
- Strabena sufferti in Rhopalocera Aethiopica Aurivillius, 1895 (6)

Scientific classification
- Kingdom: Animalia
- Phylum: Arthropoda
- Class: Insecta
- Order: Lepidoptera
- Family: Nymphalidae
- Genus: Strabena
- Species: S. sufferti

Binomial name
- Strabena sufferti (Aurivillius, 1899)

Synonyms
- Ypthima sufferti Aurivillius, 1899

= Strabena sufferti =

Species of butterfly

Strabena sufferti is a butterfly in the family Nymphalidae. It is found in Madagascar. The habitat consists of forests and forest margins.
