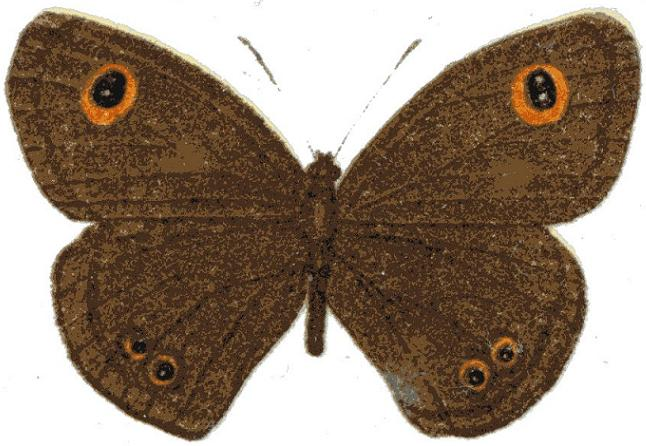

Scientific classification
- Kingdom: Animalia
- Phylum: Arthropoda
- Class: Insecta
- Order: Lepidoptera
- Family: Nymphalidae
- Genus: Strabena
- Species: S. vinsoni

Binomial name
- Strabena vinsoni (Guenée, 1865)

Synonyms
- Yphtima vinsoni Guenée, 1865

= Strabena vinsoni =

Species of butterfly

Strabena vinsoni is a butterfly in the family Nymphalidae. It is found in Madagascar. The habitat consists of forests.
