= Strabena perrieri =

Scientific classification
- Kingdom: Animalia
- Phylum: Arthropoda
- Class: Insecta
- Order: Lepidoptera
- Family: Nymphalidae
- Genus: Strabena
- Species: S. perrieri

Binomial name
- Strabena perrieri Paulian, 1951

Species of butterfly

Strabena perrieri is a butterfly in the family Nymphalidae. It is found in Madagascar, where it is known from the Sambirano River area. The habitat consists of forests.
