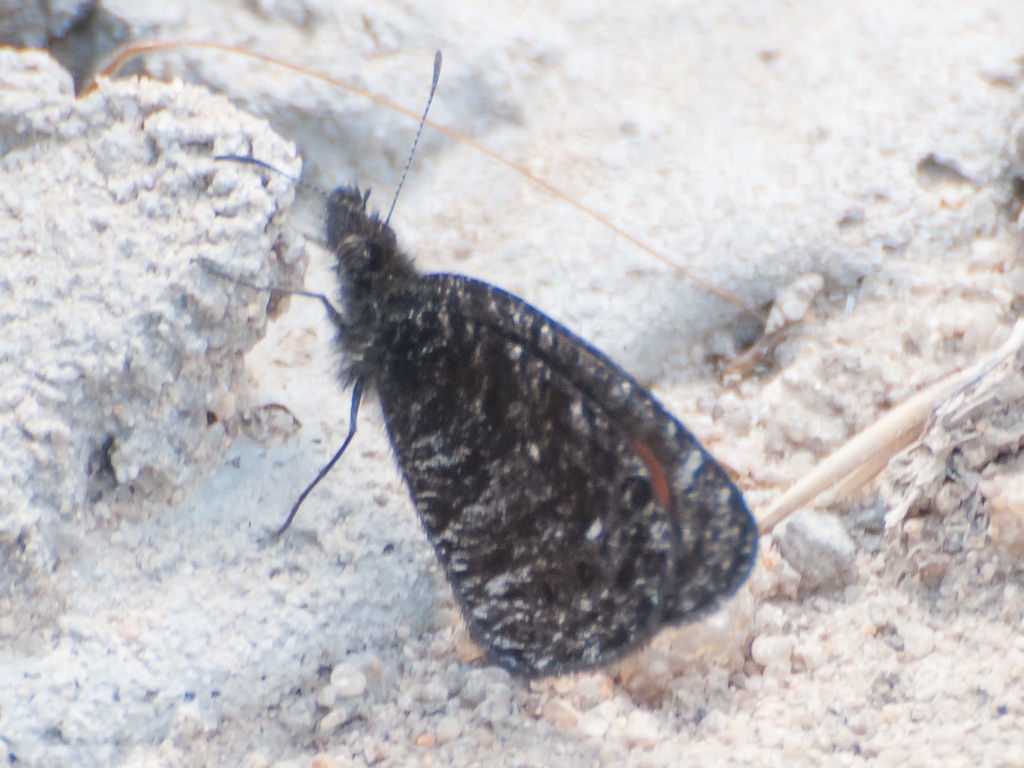

Scientific classification
- Kingdom: Animalia
- Phylum: Arthropoda
- Class: Insecta
- Order: Lepidoptera
- Family: Nymphalidae
- Genus: Strabena
- Species: S. martini

Binomial name
- Strabena martini Oberthür, 1916

= Strabena martini =

Species of butterfly

Strabena martini is a butterfly in the family Nymphalidae. It is found along the coast of Madagascar.
