= Hovala dispar =

Scientific classification
- Kingdom: Animalia
- Phylum: Arthropoda
- Class: Insecta
- Order: Lepidoptera
- Family: Hesperiidae
- Genus: Hovala
- Species: H. dispar

Binomial name
- Hovala dispar (Mabille, 1877)

Synonyms
- Cyclopides dispar Mabille, 1877; Heteropterus disparilis Oberthür, 1916

Species of butterfly

Hovala dispar is a butterfly in the family Hesperiidae. It is found in central and eastern Madagascar. The habitat consists of forests.
