= Strabena argyrina =

Scientific classification
- Kingdom: Animalia
- Phylum: Arthropoda
- Class: Insecta
- Order: Lepidoptera
- Family: Nymphalidae
- Genus: Strabena
- Species: S. argyrina

Binomial name
- Strabena argyrina Mabille, 1878

Species of butterfly

Strabena argyrina is a butterfly in the family Nymphalidae. It is found on Madagascar. The habitat consists of natural grassland and marshlands.
