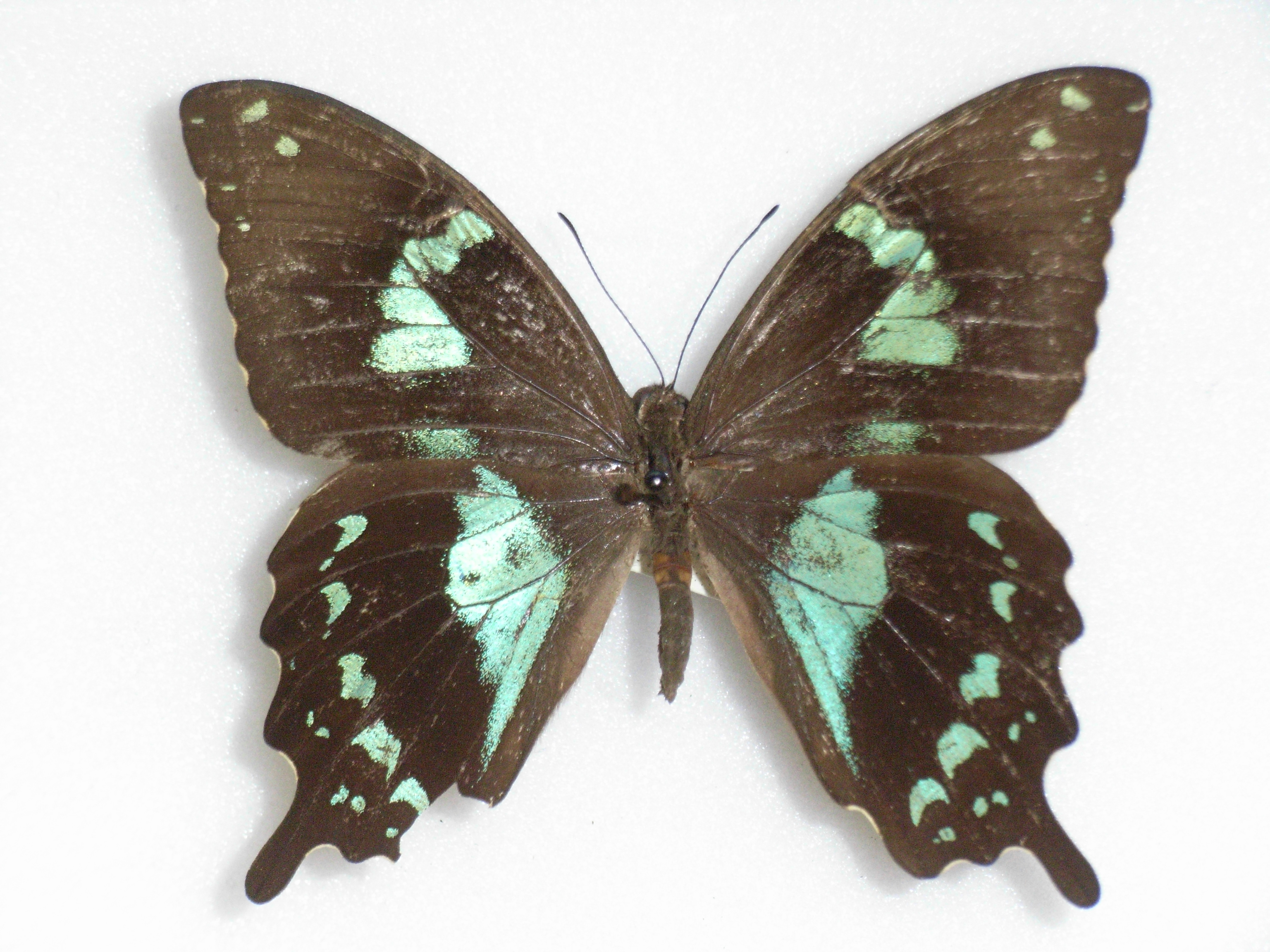
- Female
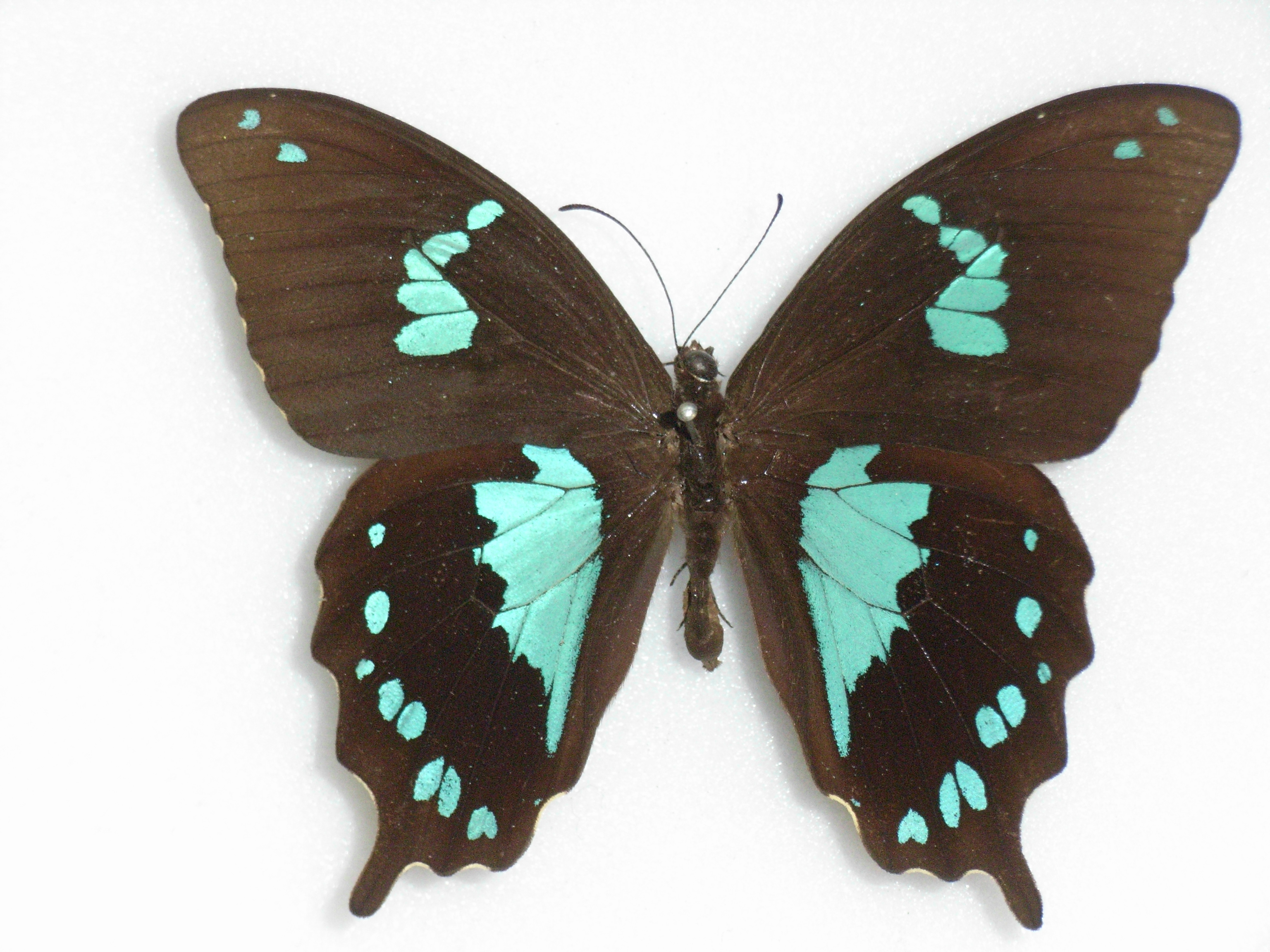
- Male

Scientific classification
- Kingdom: Animalia
- Phylum: Arthropoda
- Clade: Pancrustacea
- Class: Insecta
- Order: Lepidoptera
- Family: Papilionidae
- Genus: Papilio
- Species: P. epiphorbas

Binomial name
- Papilio epiphorbas Boisduval, 1833 Full text

Synonyms
- Druryia epiphorbas; Papilio epiphorbas f. hova Le Cerf, 1924; Papilio epiphorbas f. oriphorbas Le Cerf, 1924

= Papilio epiphorbas =

Species of butterfly

Papilio epiphorbas is a butterfly of the family Papilionidae. It is found in Madagascar and the Comoro Islands.

== Taxonomy ==
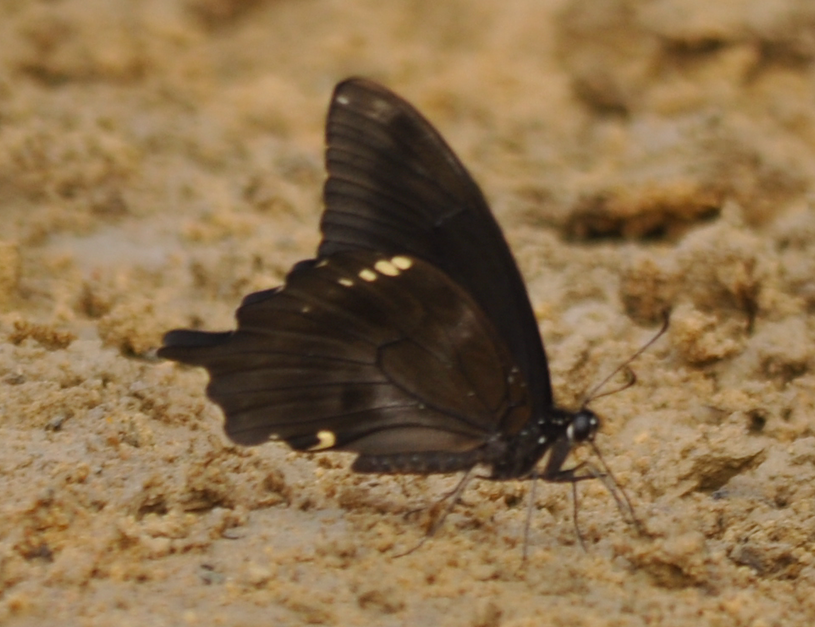
Underside

Papilio epiphorbas is a member of the oribazus species-group. The clade members are

- Papilio oribazus Boisduval, 1836
- Papilio epiphorbas Boisduval, 1833
- Papilio nobilis Rogenhofer, 1891

== Subspecies ==
- Papilio epiphorbas epiphorbas (Madagascar)
- Papilio epiphorbas guyonnaudi Turlin & Guilbot, 1990 (Anjouan)
- Papilio epiphorbas praedicta Turlin & Guilbot, 1990 (Grand Comore)
