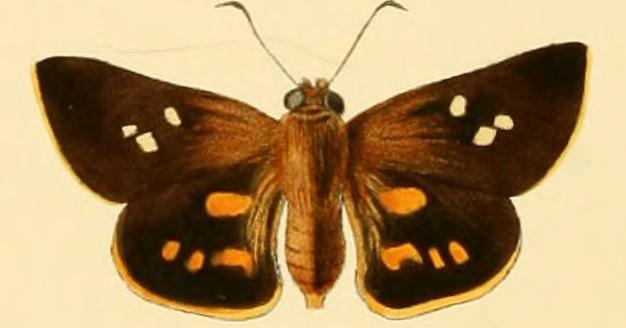

Scientific classification
- Domain: Eukaryota
- Kingdom: Animalia
- Phylum: Arthropoda
- Class: Insecta
- Order: Lepidoptera
- Family: Hesperiidae
- Genus: Malaza
- Species: M. carmides

Binomial name
- Malaza carmides (Hewitson, 1868)

Synonyms
- Cyclopides carmides Hewitson, 1868; Cyclopides catocalinus Mabille, 1878

= Malaza carmides =

Species of butterfly

Malaza carmides is a butterfly in the family Hesperiidae. It is found on Madagascar (except the south). The habitat consists of forests, secondary forests and forest margins.
