= Hovala amena =

Scientific classification
- Kingdom: Animalia
- Phylum: Arthropoda
- Class: Insecta
- Order: Lepidoptera
- Family: Hesperiidae
- Genus: Hovala
- Species: H. amena

Binomial name
- Hovala amena (Grose-Smith, 1891)

Synonyms
- Cyclopides amena Grose-Smith, 1891

Species of butterfly

Hovala amena is a butterfly in the family Hesperiidae. It is found in north-western Madagascar.
