= Strabena excellens =

Scientific classification
- Kingdom: Animalia
- Phylum: Arthropoda
- Class: Insecta
- Order: Lepidoptera
- Family: Nymphalidae
- Genus: Strabena
- Species: S. excellens

Binomial name
- Strabena excellens (Butler, 1885)

Synonyms
- Ypthima excellens Butler, 1885; Strabena parens Oberthür, 1916

Species of butterfly

Strabena excellens is a butterfly in the family Nymphalidae. It is found on Madagascar. The habitat consists of forests.
