= Strabena consors =

Scientific classification
- Kingdom: Animalia
- Phylum: Arthropoda
- Class: Insecta
- Order: Lepidoptera
- Family: Nymphalidae
- Genus: Strabena
- Species: S. consors

Binomial name
- Strabena consors Oberthür, 1916

Species of butterfly

Strabena consors is a butterfly in the family Nymphalidae. It is found on Madagascar. The habitat consists of forests.
