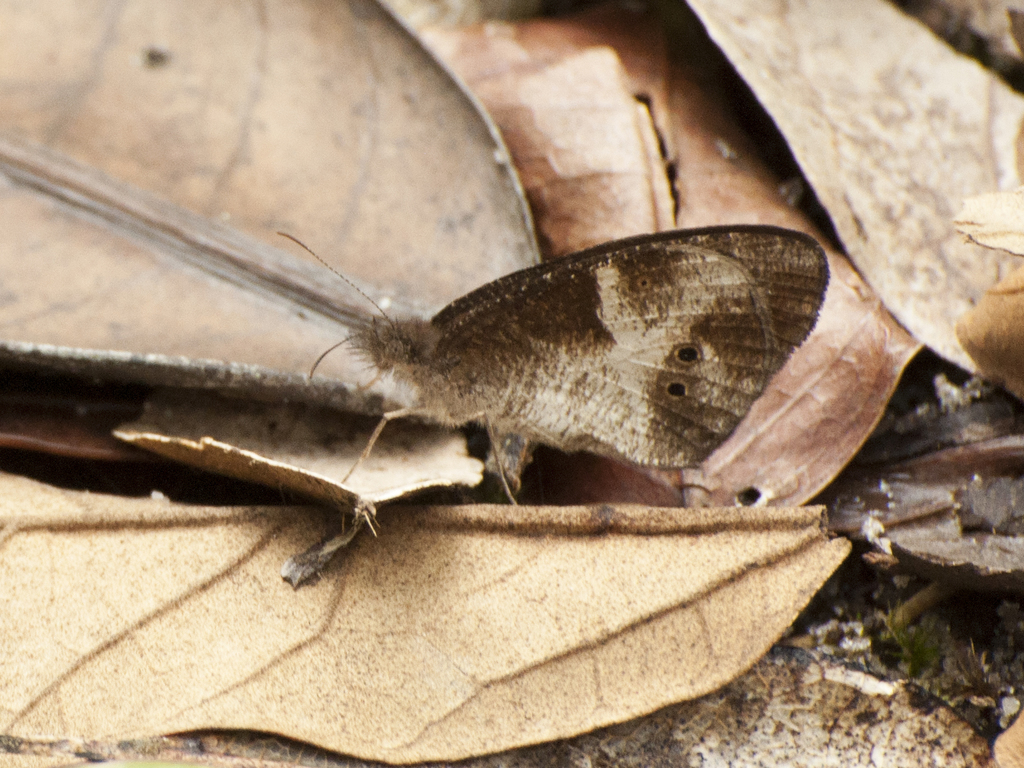

Scientific classification
- Kingdom: Animalia
- Phylum: Arthropoda
- Class: Insecta
- Order: Lepidoptera
- Family: Nymphalidae
- Genus: Strabena
- Species: S. ibitina

Binomial name
- Strabena ibitina (Ward, 1873)

Synonyms
- Mycalesis ibitina Ward, 1873

= Strabena ibitina =

Species of butterfly

Strabena ibitina is a butterfly in the family Nymphalidae. It is found on Madagascar. The habitat consists of forests.
