= Strabena daphne =

Scientific classification
- Kingdom: Animalia
- Phylum: Arthropoda
- Clade: Pancrustacea
- Class: Insecta
- Order: Lepidoptera
- Family: Nymphalidae
- Genus: Strabena
- Species: S. daphne

Binomial name
- Strabena daphne Viette, 1971

Species of butterfly

Strabena daphne is a butterfly in the family Nymphalidae. It is found in central Madagascar. The habitat consists of forests.
