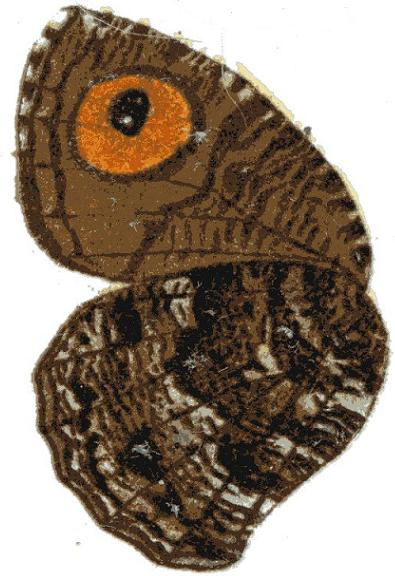

Scientific classification
- Kingdom: Animalia
- Phylum: Arthropoda
- Class: Insecta
- Order: Lepidoptera
- Family: Nymphalidae
- Genus: Strabena
- Species: S. zanjuka

Binomial name
- Strabena zanjuka Mabille, [1885]

Synonyms
- Strabena zanjuca; Strabena zanjuga

= Strabena zanjuka =

Species of butterfly

Strabena zanjuka is a butterfly in the family Nymphalidae. It is found in Madagascar.
