= Strabena mopsus =

Scientific classification
- Kingdom: Animalia
- Phylum: Arthropoda
- Class: Insecta
- Order: Lepidoptera
- Family: Nymphalidae
- Genus: Strabena
- Species: S. mopsus

Binomial name
- Strabena mopsus (Mabille, 1878)

Synonyms
- Satyrus mopsus Mabille, 1878

Species of butterfly

Strabena mopsus is a butterfly in the family Nymphalidae. It is found in Madagascar. The habitat consists of forests.
