= Hovala pardalina =

Scientific classification
- Kingdom: Animalia
- Phylum: Arthropoda
- Class: Insecta
- Order: Lepidoptera
- Family: Hesperiidae
- Genus: Hovala
- Species: H. pardalina

Binomial name
- Hovala pardalina (Butler, 1879)

Synonyms
- Cyclopides pardalina Butler, 1879; Heteropterus labordei Oberthür, 1916

Species of butterfly

Hovala pardalina is a butterfly in the family Hesperiidae. It is found in central, northern and north-eastern Madagascar. The habitat consists of forests.
