= Strabena eros =

Scientific classification
- Kingdom: Animalia
- Phylum: Arthropoda
- Class: Insecta
- Order: Lepidoptera
- Family: Nymphalidae
- Genus: Strabena
- Species: S. eros

Binomial name
- Strabena eros Viette, 1971

Species of butterfly

Strabena eros is a butterfly in the family Nymphalidae. It is found in central Madagascar. The habitat consists of forests.
