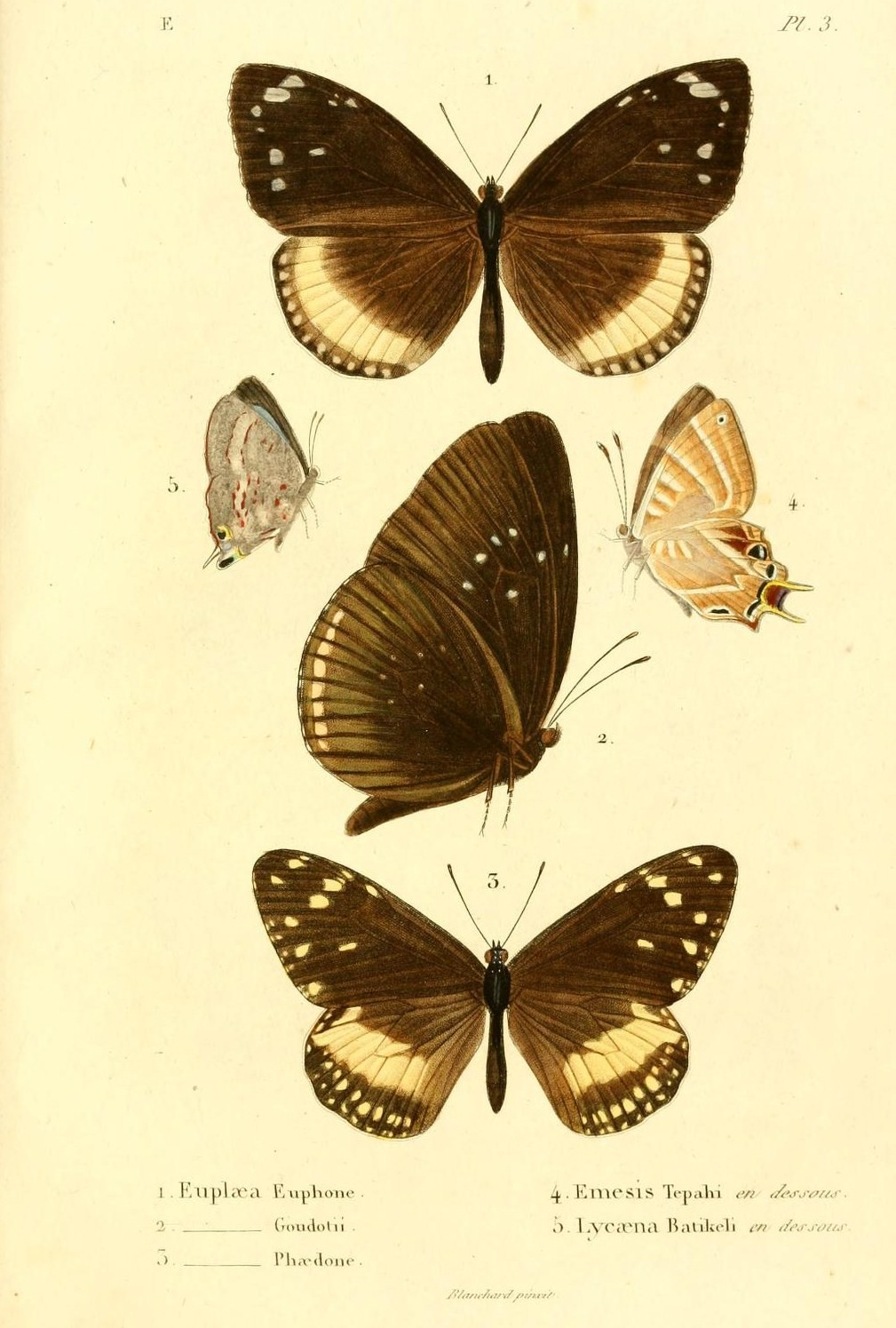
- Figure 4

Scientific classification
- Kingdom: Animalia
- Phylum: Arthropoda
- Class: Insecta
- Order: Lepidoptera
- Family: Riodinidae
- Genus: Saribia
- Species: S. tepahi

Binomial name
- Saribia tepahi (Boisduval, 1833)

Synonyms
- Emesis tepahi Boisduval, 1833

= Saribia tepahi =

Species of butterfly

Saribia tepahi is a butterfly in the family Riodinidae. It is found on Tamatave, Madagascar. The habitat consists of forests.
