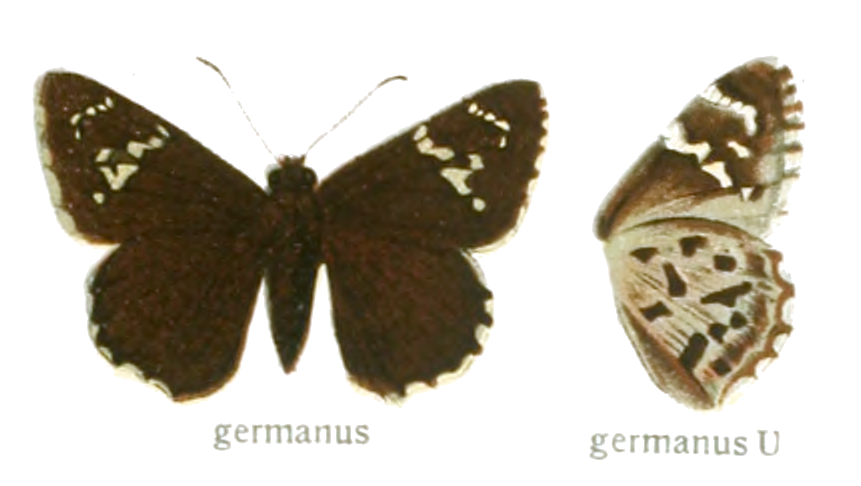

Scientific classification
- Kingdom: Animalia
- Phylum: Arthropoda
- Class: Insecta
- Order: Lepidoptera
- Family: Nymphalidae
- Genus: Strabena
- Species: S. germanus

Binomial name
- Strabena germanus Oberthür, 1916

= Strabena germanus =

Species of butterfly

Strabena germanus is a butterfly in the family Nymphalidae. It is found on Madagascar.
