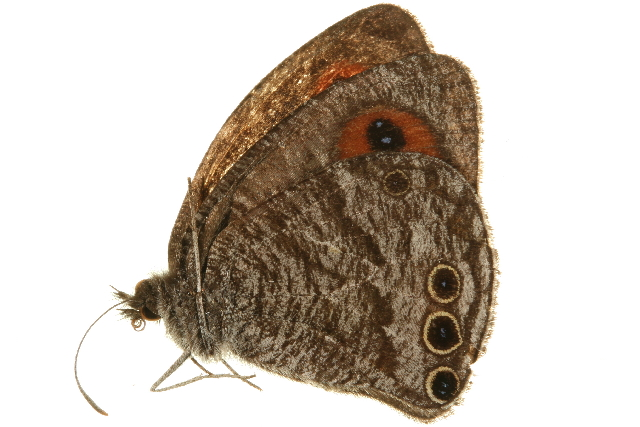

Scientific classification
- Kingdom: Animalia
- Phylum: Arthropoda
- Class: Insecta
- Order: Lepidoptera
- Family: Nymphalidae
- Genus: Strabena
- Species: S. isoalensis

Binomial name
- Strabena isoalensis Paulian, 1951

= Strabena isoalensis =

Species of butterfly

Strabena isoalensis is a butterfly in the family Nymphalidae. It is found in western Madagascar.
