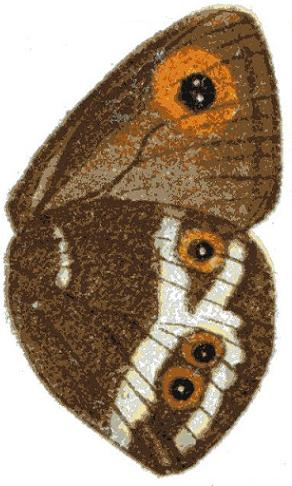

Scientific classification
- Kingdom: Animalia
- Phylum: Arthropoda
- Class: Insecta
- Order: Lepidoptera
- Family: Nymphalidae
- Genus: Strabena
- Species: S. nepos

Binomial name
- Strabena nepos Oberthür, 1916

Synonyms
- Ypthima batesii ab. elwesi Aurivillius, 1899; Strabena io Paulian, 1950

= Strabena nepos =

Species of butterfly

Strabena nepos is a butterfly in the family Nymphalidae. It is found in Madagascar. The habitat consists of forests.
