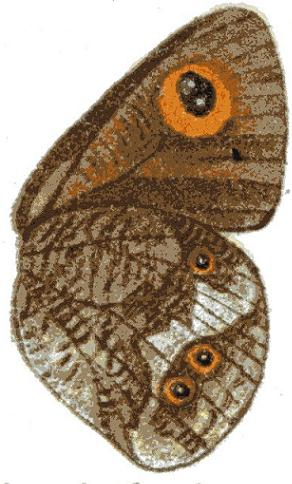

Scientific classification
- Kingdom: Animalia
- Phylum: Arthropoda
- Class: Insecta
- Order: Lepidoptera
- Family: Nymphalidae
- Genus: Strabena
- Species: S. triophthalma

Binomial name
- Strabena triophthalma Mabille, [1885]

Synonyms
- Strabena vinsoni var. triophthalma Mabille, [1885]

= Strabena triophthalma =

Species of butterfly

Strabena triophthalma is a butterfly in the family Nymphalidae. It is found in Madagascar. The habitat consists of forests and forest margins.
