= Saribia decaryi =

Scientific classification
- Kingdom: Animalia
- Phylum: Arthropoda
- Class: Insecta
- Order: Lepidoptera
- Family: Riodinidae
- Genus: Saribia
- Species: S. decaryi

Binomial name
- Saribia decaryi (Le Cerf, 1922)

Synonyms
- Abisara decaryi Le Cerf, 1922

Species of butterfly

Saribia decaryi is a butterfly in the family Riodinidae. It is found on Madagascar. The habitat consists of forests.
