= Strabena andriana =

Scientific classification
- Kingdom: Animalia
- Phylum: Arthropoda
- Class: Insecta
- Order: Lepidoptera
- Family: Nymphalidae
- Genus: Strabena
- Species: S. andriana

Binomial name
- Strabena andriana Mabille, [1885]

Synonyms
- Strabena vicina Oberthür, 1916

Species of butterfly

Strabena andriana is a butterfly in the family Nymphalidae. It is found on Madagascar. The habitat consists of forests.
