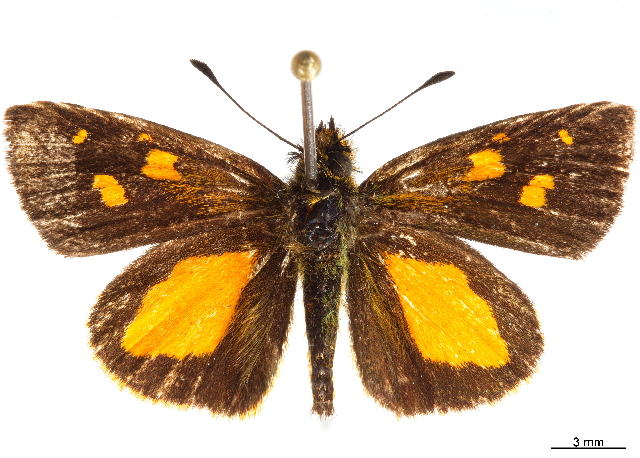

Scientific classification
- Kingdom: Animalia
- Phylum: Arthropoda
- Class: Insecta
- Order: Lepidoptera
- Family: Hesperiidae
- Genus: Hovala
- Species: H. saclavus

Binomial name
- Hovala saclavus (Mabille, 1891)

Synonyms
- Cyclopides saclavus Mabille, 1891; Heteropterus gallienii Oberthür, 1916

= Hovala saclavus =

Species of butterfly

Hovala saclavus is a butterfly in the family Hesperiidae. It is found in eastern Madagascar. The habitat consists of forests.
