= Strabena soror =

Scientific classification
- Kingdom: Animalia
- Phylum: Arthropoda
- Class: Insecta
- Order: Lepidoptera
- Family: Nymphalidae
- Genus: Strabena
- Species: S. soror

Binomial name
- Strabena soror Oberthür, 1916

Species of butterfly

Strabena soror is a butterfly in the family Nymphalidae. It is found in Madagascar.
