= Galerga hyposticta =

Scientific classification
- Kingdom: Animalia
- Phylum: Arthropoda
- Class: Insecta
- Order: Lepidoptera
- Family: Hesperiidae
- Genus: Galerga
- Species: G. hyposticta

Binomial name
- Galerga hyposticta Mabille, 1898

Synonyms
- Arnetta hyposticta (Mabille, 1898); Arnetta (Galerga) hyposticta (Mabille, 1898)

Species of butterfly

Galerga hyposticta is a species of butterfly in the family Hesperiidae. It is found in eastern Madagascar. The habitat consists of forests.
