= Saribia ochracea =

Scientific classification
- Kingdom: Animalia
- Phylum: Arthropoda
- Class: Insecta
- Order: Lepidoptera
- Family: Riodinidae
- Genus: Saribia
- Species: S. ochracea

Binomial name
- Saribia ochracea Riley, 1932

Synonyms
- Saribia perroti ochracea Riley, 1932

Species of butterfly

Saribia ochracea is a butterfly in the family Riodinidae. It is found in eastern Madagascar. The habitat consists of lowland forests.
