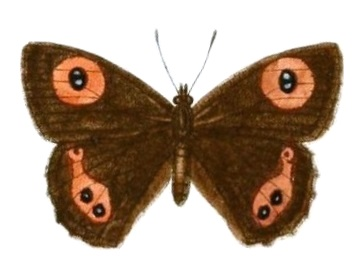

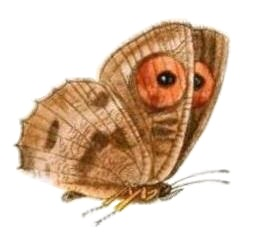

Scientific classification
- Kingdom: Animalia
- Phylum: Arthropoda
- Class: Insecta
- Order: Lepidoptera
- Family: Nymphalidae
- Genus: Strabena
- Species: S. tamatavae

Binomial name
- Strabena tamatavae (Boisduval, 1833)

Synonyms
- Satyrus tamatave Boisduval, 1833

= Strabena tamatavae =

Species of butterfly

Strabena tamatavae is a butterfly in the family Nymphalidae. It is found on Madagascar, from the eastern part of the island to Tamatave. The habitat consists of transformed grasslands, anthropogenic environments and marshlands.
