= Artitropa reducta =

Scientific classification
- Kingdom: Animalia
- Phylum: Arthropoda
- Class: Insecta
- Order: Lepidoptera
- Family: Hesperiidae
- Genus: Artitropa
- Species: A. reducta

Binomial name
- Artitropa reducta Aurivillius, 1925

Synonyms
- Artitropa comus var. reducta Aurivillius, 1925

Species of butterfly

Artitropa reducta is a species of butterfly in the family Hesperiidae. It is found in Cameroon, the Republic of the Congo, the Democratic Republic of the Congo, Uganda, western Kenya, southern Ethiopia, the coast of Tanzania, Malawi, Zambia, Mozambique and eastern Zimbabwe.

Adults are attracted to flowers and have been recorded feeding on the flowers of Brunfelsia species. They are on wing year-round.

The larvae feed on Dracaena reflexa var. nitens, Dracaena steudneri and Dracena mannii.
