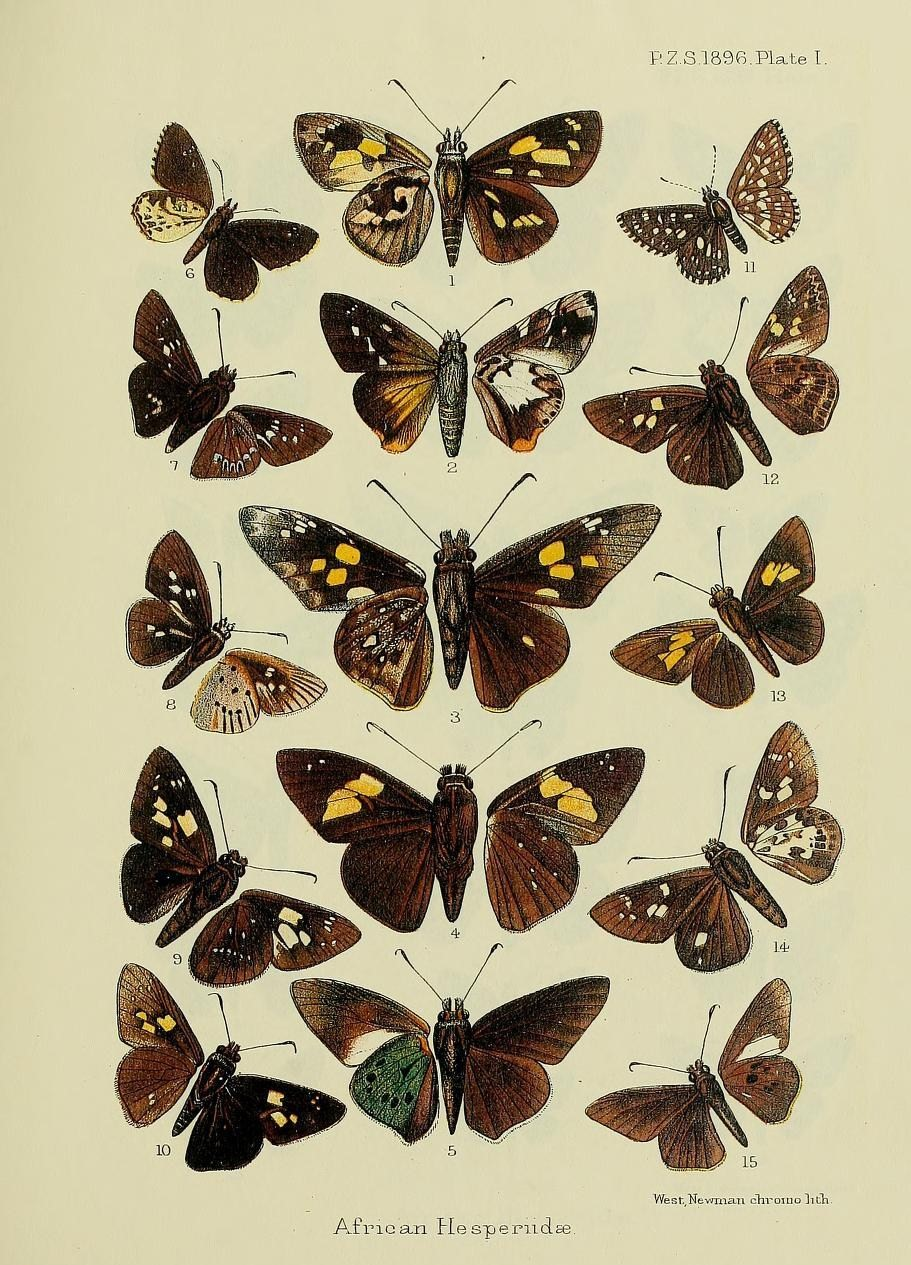
- Artitropa comus figure 2'

Scientific classification
- Kingdom: Animalia
- Phylum: Arthropoda
- Clade: Pancrustacea
- Class: Insecta
- Order: Lepidoptera
- Family: Hesperiidae
- Genus: Artitropa
- Species: A. comus

Binomial name
- Artitropa comus (Stoll, 1782)

Synonyms
- List: Papilio comus Stoll, 1782; Papilio helops Drury, 1782; Hesperia ennius Fabricius, 1793; Proteides margaritata Holland, 1890

= Artitropa comus =

Western nightfighter

Species of butterfly

Artitropa comus, the western nightfighter, is a species of butterfly in the family Hesperiidae. It is found in Senegal, Guinea, Sierra Leone, Liberia, Ivory Coast, Ghana, Togo, Nigeria, Cameroon, Gabon, the Republic of the Congo, the Democratic Republic of the Congo and Zambia. The habitat consists of forests.

Adults are attracted to pawpaw flowers.

The larvae feed on Dracaena species, including Dracaena uganda, Dracaena manni, Dracaena usambarensis, Dracaena reflexa var. nitens, Dracaena steudneri and Dracaena perrotteti.

Torben Larsen developed a species numbering system for his 2005 publication Butterflies of West Africa. This species is #1379. The 'Larsen' numbers have since been used with permission in A Sharp Eye on Butterflies of Ghana.
