= Colp =

Colp or COLP may refer to:

- Colp, Illinois
- A colposcopy, a medical procedure to analyze the cervix.
- Colp, County Meath, Ireland, a small village south of Drogheda. It takes its name from Inbher Colpa the old name of the Boyne estuary. Colpe is also a civil parish in East Meath.
- Certified Ornamental Landscape Professional, a professional certification by the Professional Landcare Network
- Compliance Officers for Legal Practice, as defined by the Solicitors Regulation Authority
