= Song of India =

Song of India may refer to:

- Song of India, common name for plant dracaena reflexa, first described in 1786
- "Song of India" (song), aria from Rimsky-Korsakov's 1896 opera Sadko
- "Song of India", alternative name for "Sare Jahan se Accha", 1904 Urdu poem, later song
- Song of India (film), 1949 American romantic adventure drama, starring Sabu
