= Artitropa milleri =

Scientific classification
- Kingdom: Animalia
- Phylum: Arthropoda
- Class: Insecta
- Order: Lepidoptera
- Family: Hesperiidae
- Genus: Artitropa
- Species: A. milleri

Binomial name
- Artitropa milleri Riley, 1925

Species of insect

Artitropa milleri is a species of butterfly in the family Hesperiidae. It is found in Uganda, Tanzania, the Democratic Republic of the Congo, Zambia and Kenya.

The larvae feed on Dracaena usambarensis, Dracaena laxissima and Dracaena mannii.

== Subspecies ==
- Artitropa milleri milleri (western Uganda, Tanzania, Democratic Republic of the Congo: Shaba, Zambia)
- Artitropa milleri coryndon Evans, 1937 (Kenya: central and eastern highlands)
