= PLCAA =

PLCAA may refer to:

- Professional Lawn Care Association of America, a defunct company that merged into Professional Landcare Network
- Protection of Lawful Commerce in Arms Act, a 2005 law passed by President George W. Bush that restricts lawsuits against the firearms industry
