= Bill Wolverton =

American scientist (1932–2026)

B. C. "Bill" Wolverton (October 13, 1932 – October 22, 2026) was an American scientist who specialized in chemistry, microbiology, biochemistry, marine biology and environmental engineering. He was well known for being the principal investigator of the famous NASA Clean Air Study, where plants were tested in order to find out their ability to purify air. Wolverton completed his PhD in environmental engineering in 1978.

== Life and career ==
Bill Wolverton was born and lived his early life in the rural areas of Mississippi. After high school he served in the United States Air Force during the Korean Conflict and the Air National Guard. After military service, he was awarded a Bachelor of Science degree in chemistry from Mississippi College in 1960. He completed three years of graduate studies at the University of Mississippi School of Medicine. He also served as a research assistant and participated in isolation, identification and immunological studies of abnormal high-molecular-weight blood proteins found in patients with rheumatoid arthritis and multiple myeloma. In 1963 he became a civilian scientist and headed the Chemical/Biological Branch Laboratory at the Naval Weapons Laboratory in Dahlgren, Virginia. There he researched methods for protecting military from chemical/biological warfare. In 1965 he transferred to Eglin Air Force Base, Florida, where he served as Chief of the Assessments Branch of the Air Force Armament Laboratory. He continued research on the subject of chemical/biological warfare during the Vietnam War. His studies resulted in numerous patents. In Florida he also studied Marine Biology at the University of West Florida.

In 1971 he was recruited to NASA as head of the Environmental Research Laboratory at the Mississippi Test Facility (now the John C. Stennis Space Center). His research efforts focused upon three specific areas of study: 1) pursue plant-based options for a 'closed ecological life support system' for long-term space habitation; 2) seek practical applications for biotechnologies to treat wastewaters; and 3) seek 'spin-off' applications for solving earthly environmental pollution problems.

After completing his doctoral degree in environmental engineering in 1978, he turned his attention to indoor air quality problems. He worked together with his colleague Dr. Rebecca McDonald-McCaleb to conduct pioneering research to determine the ability of interior plants to remove volatile organic chemicals (VOCs) from the indoor environment. Their findings were first published in 1984 in the Journal of Economic Botany. In 1983, Dr. Wolverton was named the Federal Environmental Engineer of the Year. In 1988 Dr. Wolverton was one of the first inductees into the U.S. Space Foundation's Hall of Fame.

Further studies on the ability of interior plants to improve the indoor environment continued through a jointly funded program with NASA and the Associated Landscape Contractors of America. In 1989 the results of their findings were released in a NASA report entitled 'Interior Landscape Plants for Indoor Air Pollution' and at a joint news conference at the National Press Club, Washington, D.C. in conjunction with a 'Plants for Clean Air Day' on Capitol Hill. This report received worldwide attention and Dr. Wolverton appeared on many television shows and granted interviews by journalists from across the globe. He also authored more than 70 scientific technical papers during his career.

In 1990, following the release of the NASA Clean Air Study, Dr. Wolverton retired from NASA and started a small research company of his own (Wolverton Environmental Services) together with his wife Yvonne and son, John. Since leaving NASA he has lectured throughout the world; written books on the subject and been awarded numerous patents. In 2008, Wolverton licensed technology to Phytofilter Technologies, to create potted plant air filters. In 2010, Dr. Wolverton was inducted into the Plantscape Industry Alliance Hall of Fame.

Wolverton died on October 22, 2026, at the age of 94.
