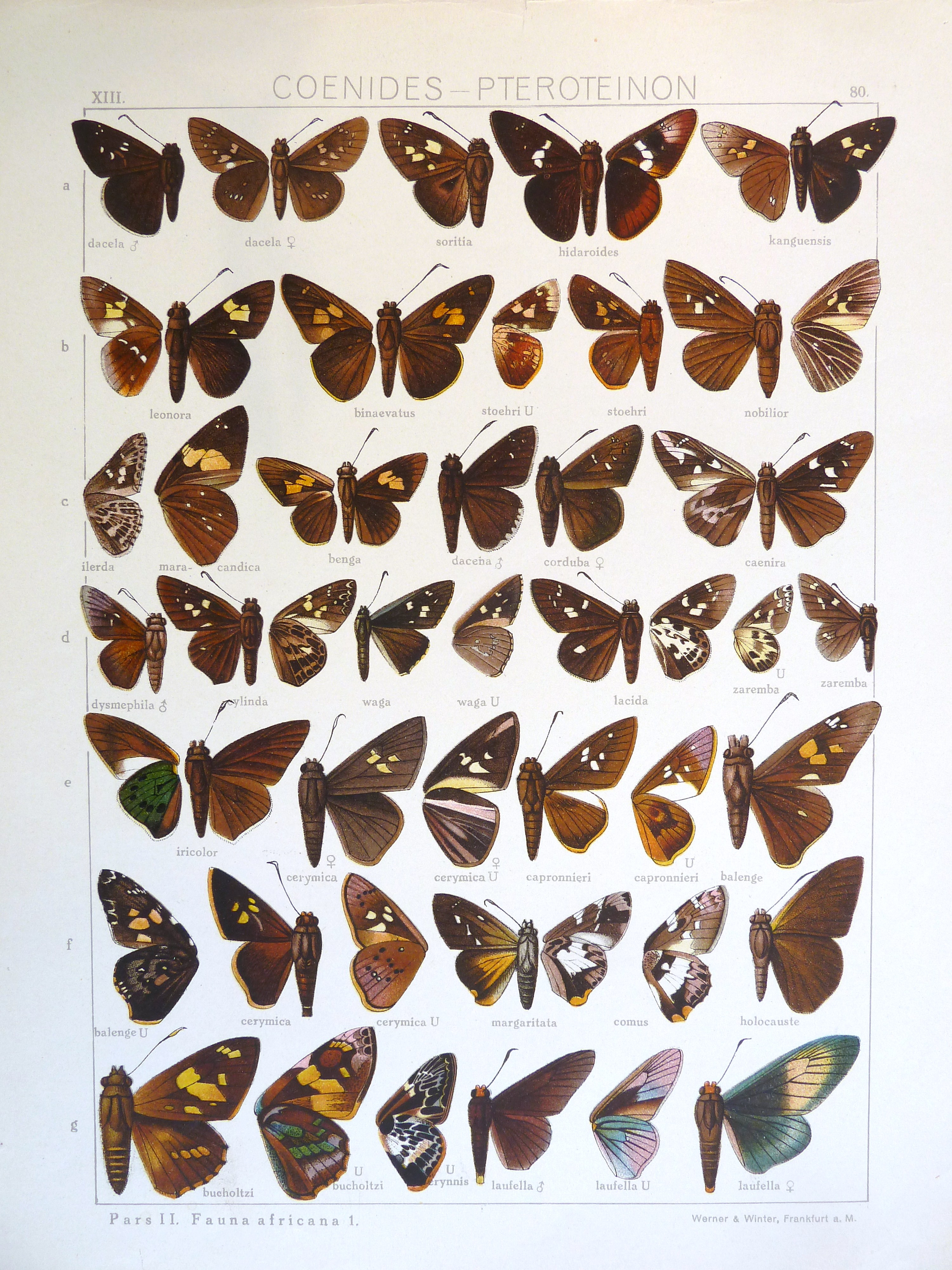

Scientific classification
- Kingdom: Animalia
- Phylum: Arthropoda
- Class: Insecta
- Order: Lepidoptera
- Family: Hesperiidae
- Genus: Artitropa
- Species: A. erinnys

Binomial name
- Artitropa erinnys (Trimen, 1862)

Synonyms
- Pamphila erinnys Trimen, 1862; Artitropa ehlersi Karsch, 1896

= Artitropa erinnys =

Species of butterfly

Artitropa erinnys, the bush night-fighter, is a species of butterfly in the family Hesperiidae. It is found in South Africa from the East Cape to KwaZulu-Natal, and Transvaal, Zimbabwe and eastern Africa.

The wingspan is 53–57 mm for males and 59–63 mm for females. Adults are on wing year-round but are scarce from May to August.

The larvae feed on Dracaena hookeriana, Dracaena afromontana, Dracaena angustifolia, Dracaena fragrans and Dracaena steudneri.

== Subspecies ==
- Artitropa erinnys erinnys (southern Mozambique, Eswatini, South Africa: coastal lowland and riverine forest from the eastern Cape and KwaZulu-Natal coast to Maputaland, spreading to the Limpopo Province)
- Artitropa erinnys comorarum Oberthür, 1916 (Comoro Islands: Grand Comore, Anjouan)
- Artitropa erinnys ehlersi Karsch, 1896 (Kenya: Mount Sagala, Teita Hills, Shimba Hills, Tanzania: from the coast inland to Arusha)
- Artitropa erinnys nyasae Riley, 1925 (eastern Zimbabwe, southern Malawi)
- Artitropa erinnys radiata Riley, 1925 (Kenya)
- Artitropa erinnys vansommereni Riley, 1925 (Kenya: Meru, Nairobi, Ngong)
