= Artitropa =

Scientific classification
- Kingdom: Animalia
- Phylum: Arthropoda
- Class: Insecta
- Order: Lepidoptera
- Family: Hesperiidae
- Tribe: Astictopterini
- Genus: Artitropa; Holland, 1896

Genus of butterflies

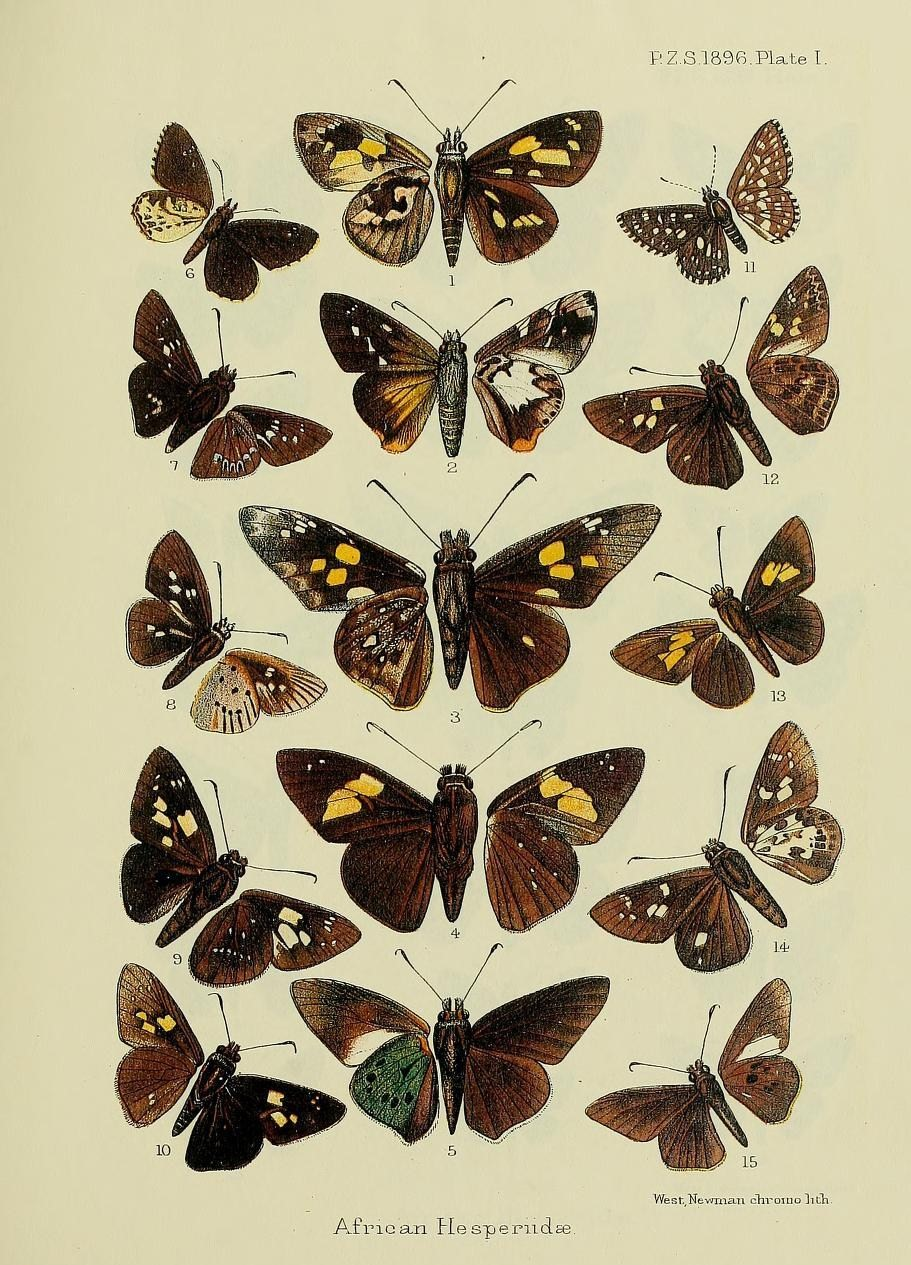
Figure 2: Proteides margaritata Holland, 1890, synonym for Artitropa comus (Stoll, 1782) male

Artitropa is a genus of skippers in the family Hesperiidae.

== Species ==
- Artitropa alaotrana Oberthür, 1916
- Artitropa boseae (Saalmüller, 1880)
- Artitropa cama Evans, 1937
- Artitropa comus (Cramer, 1782)
- Artitropa erinnys (Trimen, 1862)
- Artitropa hollandi Oberthür, 1916
- Artitropa milleri Riley, 1925
- Artitropa reducta Aurivillius, 1925
- Artitropa usambarae Congdon, Kielland, & Collins, 1998
