= NASA Clean Air Study =

1989 study of plants removing air pollutants

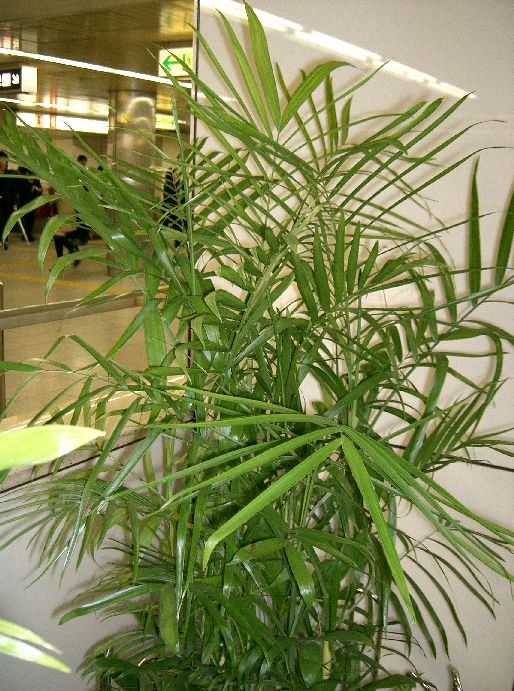
One of the plants in this study is Bamboo palm (Chamaedorea seifrizii)

The NASA Clean Air Study was a project led by the National Aeronautics and Space Administration (NASA) in association with the Associated Landscape Contractors of America (ALCA) in 1989, to research ways to clean the air in sealed environments such as space stations. Its results suggested that, in addition to absorbing carbon dioxide and releasing oxygen through photosynthesis, certain common indoor plants may also provide a natural way of removing volatile organic pollutants (benzene, formaldehyde, and trichloroethylene were tested).

These results are not applicable to typical buildings, where outdoor-to-indoor air exchange already removes volatile organic compounds (VOCs) at a rate that could only be matched by the placement of 10–1000 plants/m^{2} of a building's floor space.

The results also failed to replicate in future studies, with a 2014 review stating that:

While the plant's ability to take up VOCs is well documented in laboratory studies, the effect of plants on indoor air in complex environments like offices requires further investigations to clarify the full capacity of plants in real-life settings.

== List of plants studied ==
The following plants were tested during the initial 1989 study:

- Variegated snake plant / mother-in-law's tongue (Sansevieria trifasciata laurentii)
- English ivy (Hedera helix)
- Peace lily (Spathiphyllum 'Mauna Loa')
- Chinese evergreen (Aglaonema modestum)
- Bamboo palm (Chamaedorea seifrizii)
- Red-edged dracaena, marginata (Dracaena marginata)
- Cornstalk dracaena, mass cane/corn cane (Dracaena fragrans 'Massangeana')
- Weeping fig (Ficus benjamina)
- Barberton daisy, gerbera daisy (Gerbera jamesonii)
- Florist's chrysanthemum, pot mum (Chrysanthemum morifolium)
- Dracaena deremensis 'Janet Craig'
- Dracaena deremensis 'Warneckei'

== Additional research ==
Since the release of the initial 1989 study, titled A study of interior landscape plants for indoor air pollution abatement: An Interim Report, further research has been done including a 1993 paper and 1996 book by B. C. Wolverton, the primary researcher on the original NASA study, that listed additional plants and focused on the removal of specific chemicals. A different study in 2004 has also shown that the micro-organisms in the soil of a potted plant remove benzene from the air, and that some plant species themselves also contribute to removing benzene.

=== Other studies ===
Plants studied in various similar studies on air filtration:

Plant, removes:	Total μg/h of benzene removed	Total μg/h of formaldehyde removed	Total μg/h of trichloroethylene removed	xylene and toluene	ammonia
Dwarf date palm (Phoenix roebelenii)	0	1,385	0	Yes	No
Areca palm (Dypsis lutescens)	0	1	0	Yes	No
Boston fern (Nephrolepis exaltata 'Bostoniensis')	0	1,863	0	Yes	No
Kimberley queen fern (Nephrolepis obliterata)	0	1,328	0	Yes	No
English ivy (Hedera helix)	579	402 -1,120	298	Yes	No
Spider plant (Chlorophytum comosum)	0	560	0	Yes	No
Devil's ivy, Pothos plant (Epipremnum aureum)	0	1	0	Yes	No
Peace lily (Spathiphyllum 'Mauna Loa')	1,725	674	1,128	Yes	Yes
Flamingo lily (Anthurium andraeanum)	0	0	0	Yes	Yes
Chinese evergreen (Aglaonema modestum)	604	183	0	No	No
Bamboo palm (Chamaedorea seifrizii)	1,420	3,196	688	Yes	No
Parlour Palm (Chamaedorea elegans)	0	660	0	Yes	Yes
Lady Palm (Rhapis excelsa)	0	876	0	Yes	Yes
Variegated snake plant, mother-in-law's tongue (Sansevieria trifasciata 'Laurentii')	1,196	1,304	405	Yes	No
Heartleaf philodendron (Philodendron cordatum)	0	353	0	No	No
Selloum philodendron (Philodendron bipinnatifidum)	0	361	0	No	No
Elephant ear philodendron (Philodendron domesticum)	0	416	0	No	No
Red-edged dracaena (Dracaena marginata)	1,264	853	1,137	Yes	No
Cornstalk dracaena (Dracaena fragrans 'Massangeana')	0	938	421	Yes	No
Weeping fig (Ficus benjamina)	0	940	0	Yes	No
Barberton daisy (Gerbera jamesonii)	4,486	1	1,622	No	No
Florist's chrysanthemum (Chrysanthemum morifolium)	3,205	1,450	0	Yes	Yes
Rubber plant (Ficus elastica)	0	1	0	No	No
Dendrobium orchids (Dendrobium spp.)	0	756	0	Yes	No
Dumb canes (Dieffenbachia spp.)	0	754	0	Yes	No
King of hearts (Homalomena wallisii)	0	668	0	Yes	No
Moth orchids (Phalaenopsis spp.)	0	240	0	Yes	No
Aloe vera (Aloe vera)	1	0	0	No	No
Janet Craig (Dracaena fragrans 'Janet Craig'/Cornstalk Plant)	1,082	1,361 - 2,037	764	Yes	No
Warneckei (Dracaena deremensis 'Warneckei')	1,630	760	573	Yes	No
Banana (Musa acuminata)	0	488	0	No	No

== See also ==
- Dracaena reflexa
- Green wall
- Indoor air quality
- Phytoremediation
- Rain garden
- Sick building syndrome
