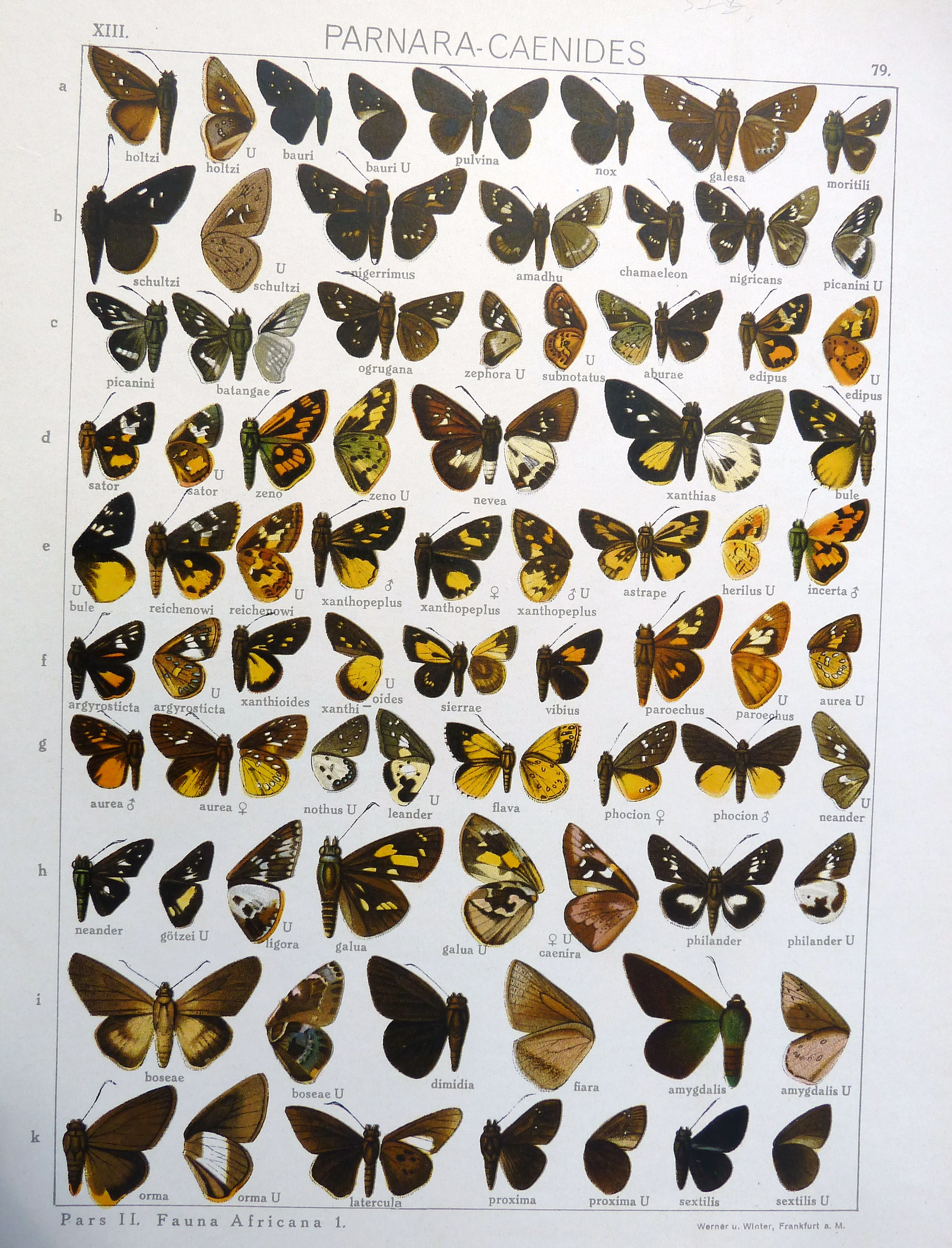

Scientific classification
- Kingdom: Animalia
- Phylum: Arthropoda
- Class: Insecta
- Order: Lepidoptera
- Family: Hesperiidae
- Genus: Artitropa
- Species: A. boseae

Binomial name
- Artitropa boseae (Saalmüller, 1880)

Synonyms
- Hesperia boseae Saalmüller, 1880; Proteides aaron Oberthür, 1916

= Artitropa boseae =

Species of butterfly

Artitropa boseae is a species of butterfly in the family Hesperiidae. It is found in northern and eastern Madagascar. The habitat consists of forest margins and anthropogenic environments.
