= Artitropa alaotrana =

Scientific classification
- Kingdom: Animalia
- Phylum: Arthropoda
- Class: Insecta
- Order: Lepidoptera
- Family: Hesperiidae
- Genus: Artitropa
- Species: A. alaotrana

Binomial name
- Artitropa alaotrana Oberthür, 1916

Species of butterfly

Artitropa alaotrana is a species of butterfly in the family Hesperiidae. It is found on Madagascar (the Antsianaka district). The habitat consists of forests.
