= Artitropa hollandi =

Scientific classification
- Kingdom: Animalia
- Phylum: Arthropoda
- Class: Insecta
- Order: Lepidoptera
- Family: Hesperiidae
- Genus: Artitropa
- Species: A. hollandi

Binomial name
- Artitropa hollandi Oberthür, 1916

Species of butterfly

Artitropa hollandi is a species of butterfly in the family Hesperiidae. It is found in northern and eastern Madagascar.
