= Artitropa usambarae =

Scientific classification
- Kingdom: Animalia
- Phylum: Arthropoda
- Class: Insecta
- Order: Lepidoptera
- Family: Hesperiidae
- Genus: Artitropa
- Species: A. usambarae

Binomial name
- Artitropa usambarae Congdon, Kielland, & Collins, 1998

Species of butterfly

Artitropa usambarae is a species of butterfly in the family Hesperiidae. It is found in north-eastern Tanzania. The habitat consists of forests.

The larvae feed on Dracaena species.
