= Artitropa cama =

Scientific classification
- Kingdom: Animalia
- Phylum: Arthropoda
- Class: Insecta
- Order: Lepidoptera
- Family: Hesperiidae
- Genus: Artitropa
- Species: A. cama

Binomial name
- Artitropa cama Evans, 1937

Species of butterfly

Artitropa cama is a species of butterfly in the family Hesperiidae. It is found in Cameroon, the Republic of the Congo and Zambia.

The larvae feed on Dracaena species.
