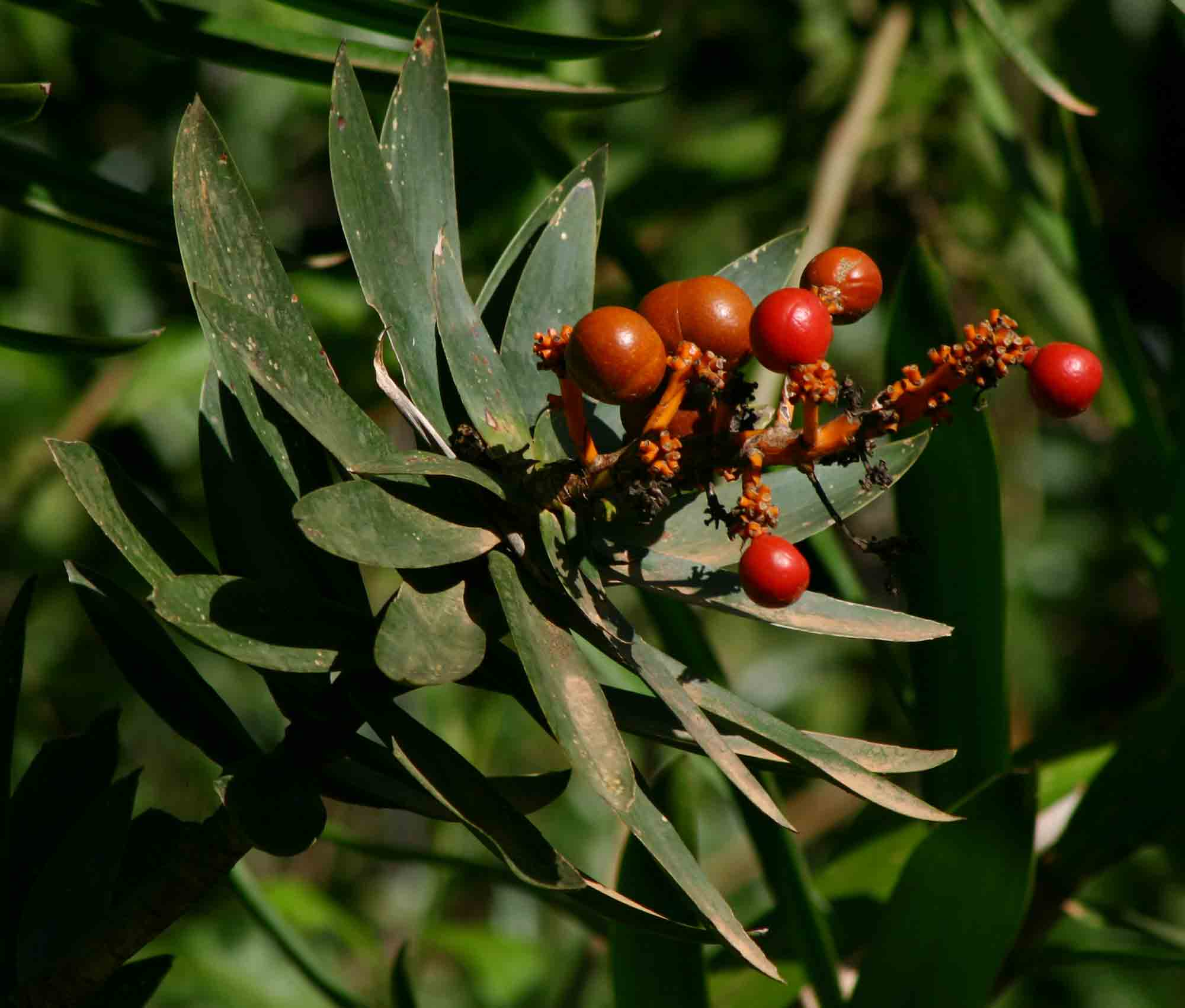

Conservation status
- Least Concern (IUCN 3.1)

Scientific classification
- Kingdom: Plantae
- Clade: Tracheophytes
- Clade: Angiosperms
- Clade: Monocots
- Order: Asparagales
- Family: Asparagaceae
- Subfamily: Convallarioideae
- Genus: Dracaena
- Species: D. mannii

Binomial name
- Dracaena mannii Baker

Synonyms
- Dracaena gazensis Rendle (1911); Dracaena nitens Welw. ex Baker (1878); Dracaena perrottetii Baker (1874); Dracaena perrottetii var. minor Baker; Dracaena pseudoreflexa Mildbr. (1910); Dracaena reflexa var. nitens (Welw. ex Baker) Baker; Dracaena thomsoniana Veitch ex Mast. & Moore; Dracaena usambarensis Engl. (1894); Draco mannii (Baker) Kuntze; Draco perottetii (Baker) Kuntze; Pleomele gazensis (Rendle) N.E.Br. Pleomele heudelotii N.E.Br. Pleomele mannii (Baker) N.E.Br. Pleomele nitens (Welw. ex Baker) N.E.Br. Pleomele perrottetii (Baker) N.E.Br. Pleomele usambarensis (Engl.) N.E.Br.

= Dracaena mannii =

Species of flowering plant

Dracaena mannii Baker or small-leaved dragon tree, also called Kalala Kabwe, is a small to medium-sized tree, though recorded up to 35 m tall with stem to 2 m in diameter (second only to Dracaena draco within the genus) in Cameroon and Gabon. It occurs from Senegal to Angola along the African west coast, is widespread in tropical Africa and is found along the African east coast from Kenya to Kosi Bay in northern KwaZulu-Natal. It prefers lowland, submontane and montane forests which are either moist and evergreen, swampy or on coastal dunes. It is also found along forest edges, in clearings and on river banks from sea level to 1,800 metres. It is one of some 120 species currently recognised in its genus, which occur primarily in Africa and southern Asia with a single vagrant species in Central America. The species is named after Gustav Mann (1836–1916), a German botanist, who corresponded with John Gilbert Baker.

This species is evergreen, single-stemmed or much branched from near the ground, sometimes stilt-rooted, and has linear to narrowly oblong-elliptic leaves with numerous parallel nerves, up to 400 x 20 mm, mostly in terminal clusters, clasping the stem for half its circumference (half-amplexicaul). Flowers are in terminal spikes or panicles (racemose to paniculate), cream or pure white in colour, yellow-green on the outside, and sweetly fragrant when opening at night. The fruit is some 30 mm in diameter, berry-like, brown at first turning bright red when ripe. Bark is white, papery and smooth, with prominent, crescent-shaped leaf scars. Old bark is smooth and grey, and longitudinally fissured, producing resin when damaged.

== Ethnic uses ==
Substances have been isolated from this species that inhibit fungal growth and the development of bacteria such as Escherichia coli, Enterococcus faecalis, Pseudomonas aeruginosa and Staphylococcus aureus. It is also used against nausea and vomiting, parasitic infections, both cutaneous and subcutaneous, swelling, oedema and gout, mouth sores, worms, lung ailments. Extracts of leaves containing glycosides, saponins and steroids are used against pain, and bark extracts as an arrow-poison, while leaf-ash is used in the making of soap. Pulverised roots are soaked in cold water and the infusion is used against stomach-ache, gonorrhoea and chest pains.

Young leaves and sprouts are cooked and eaten as a vegetable, or with rice and beans. Found in Kenya, Tanzania, Senegal, Gambia, South Africa, Mozambique, Zimbabwe, Ivory Coast, Gabon, Cameroun and Nigeria, it may be propagated from seed, leaf cuttings, rhizomes or suckers. Ripe fruits are used as a fish poison.

== Gallery ==
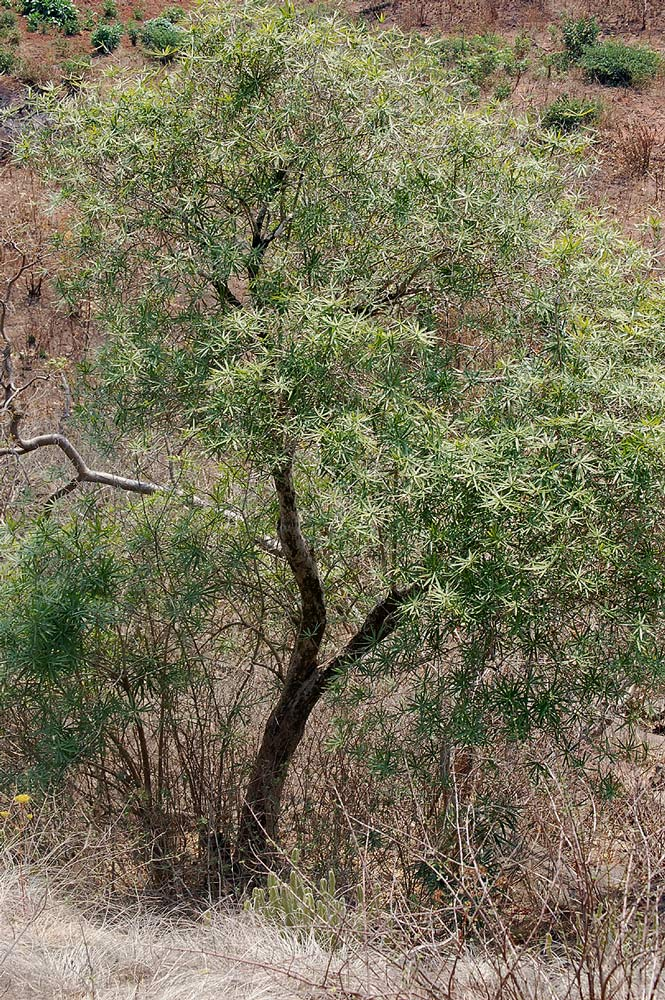

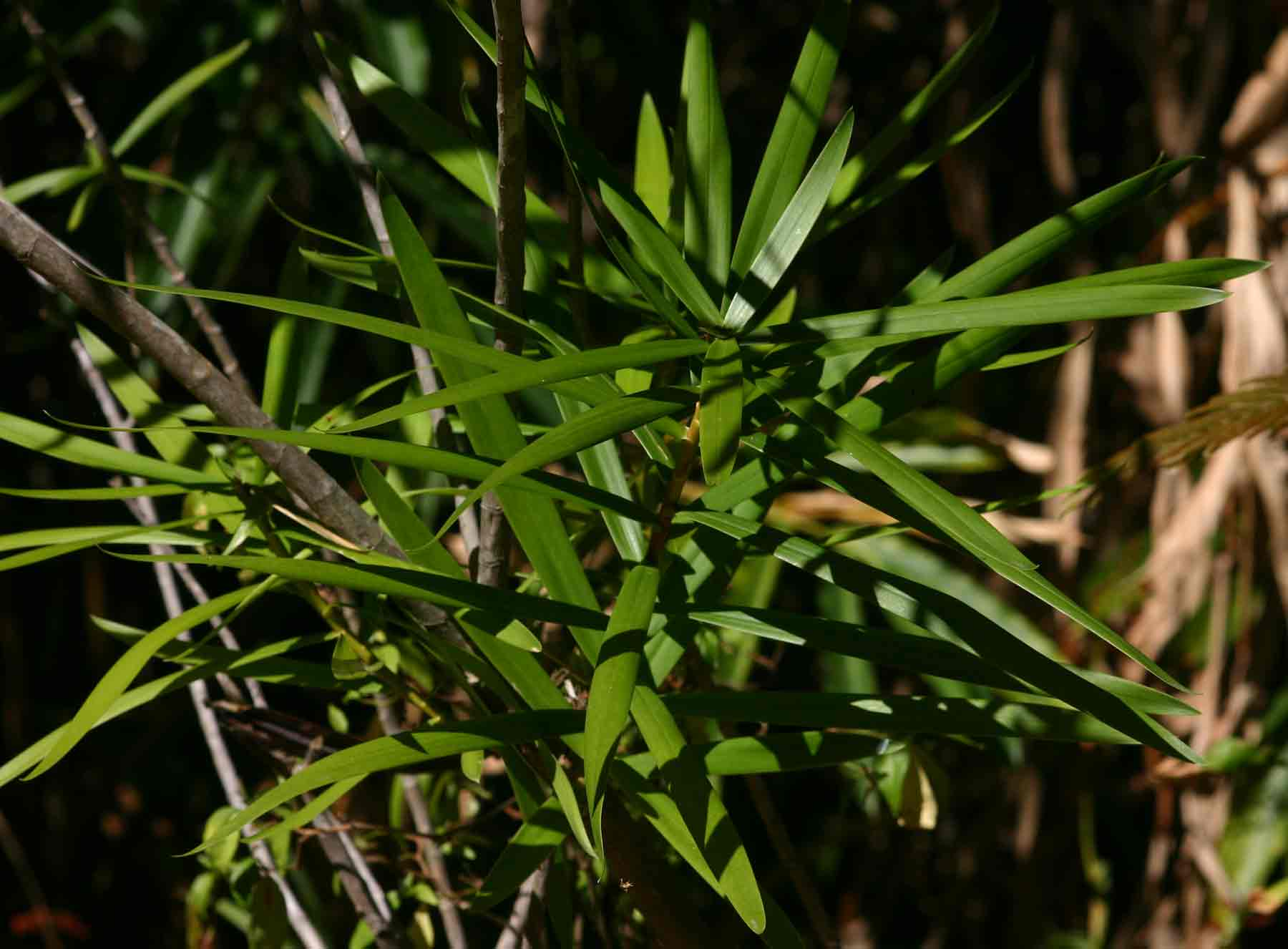

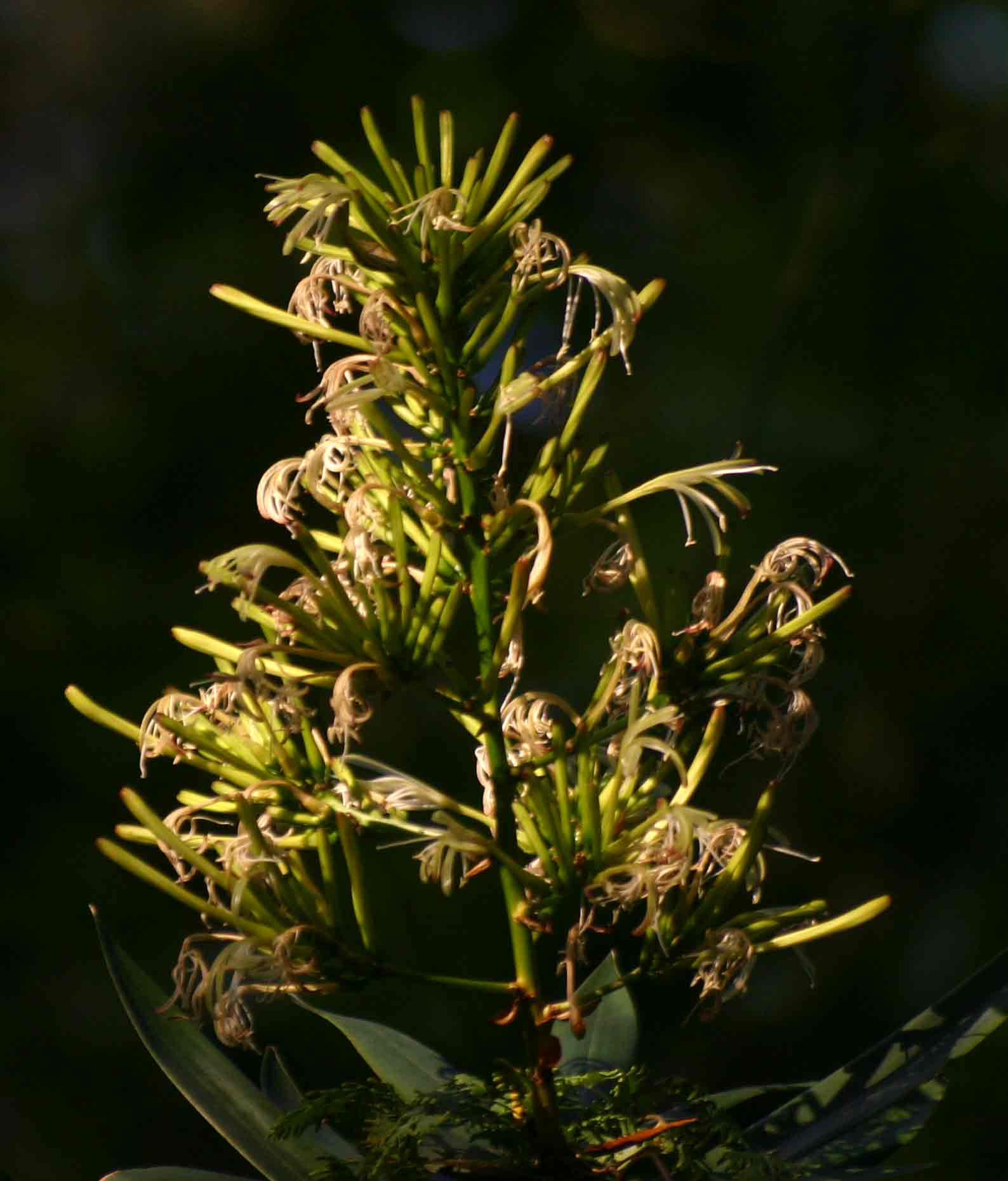
