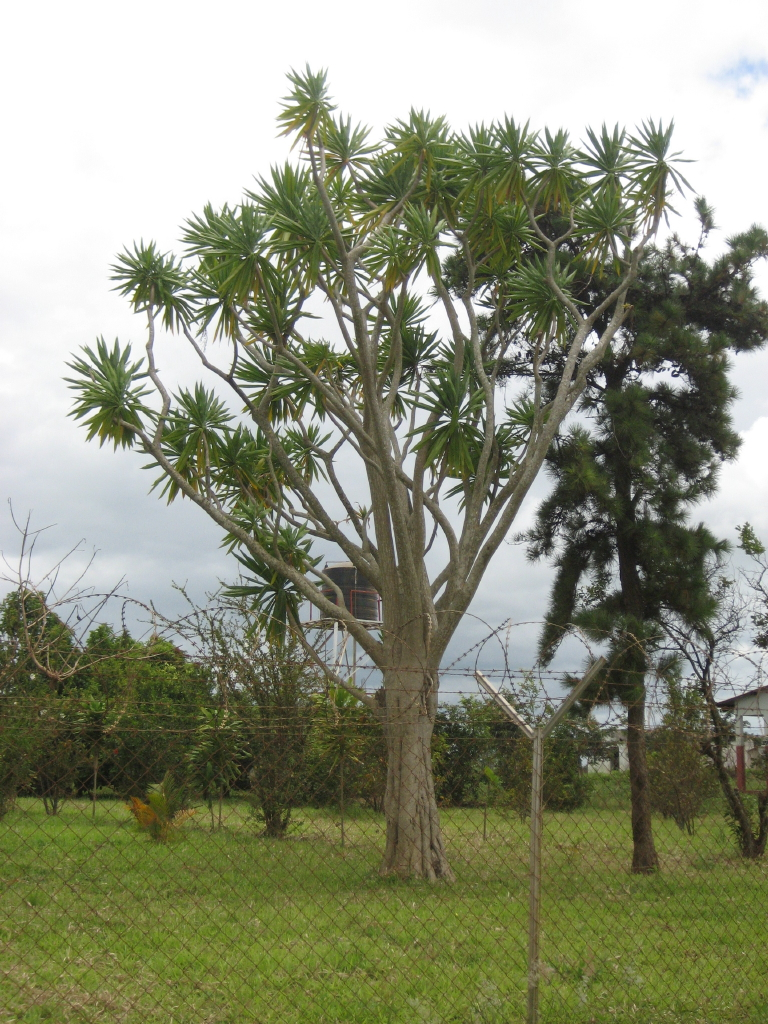
- Growth form
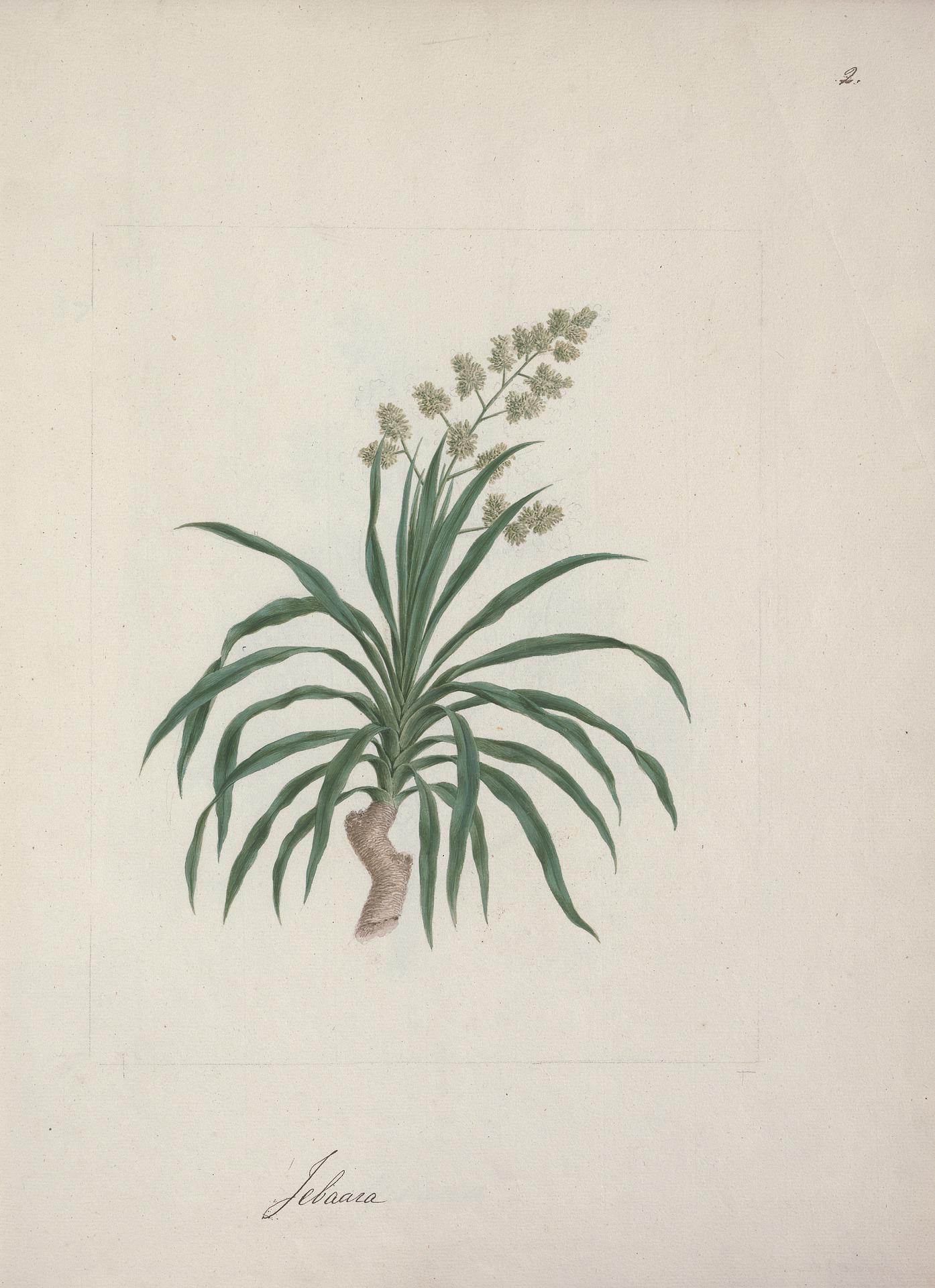
- Botanical illustration

Conservation status
- Least Concern (IUCN 3.1)

Scientific classification
- Kingdom: Plantae
- Clade: Tracheophytes
- Clade: Angiosperms
- Clade: Monocots
- Order: Asparagales
- Family: Asparagaceae
- Subfamily: Convallarioideae
- Genus: Dracaena
- Species: D. steudneri

Binomial name
- Dracaena steudneri Engl.

Synonyms
- Dracaena papahu Engl.; Pleomele papahu (Engl.) N.E.Br.; Pleomele steudneri (Engl.) N.E.Br.

= Dracaena steudneri =

Species of flowering plant

Dracaena steudneri, the northern large-leaved dragon-tree, is a species of flowering plant in the family Asparagaceae, found from Ethiopia to southern tropical Africa. It is being investigated for its high-quality fiber content. It is fed upon by larvae of the bush nightfighter, Artitropa erinnys. In the past the name Dracaena steudneri was erroneously assigned to the well-known ornamental and house plant Dracaena fragrans, called the cornstalk dracaena, striped dracaena, compact dracaena, and corn plant, leading to much confusion.
