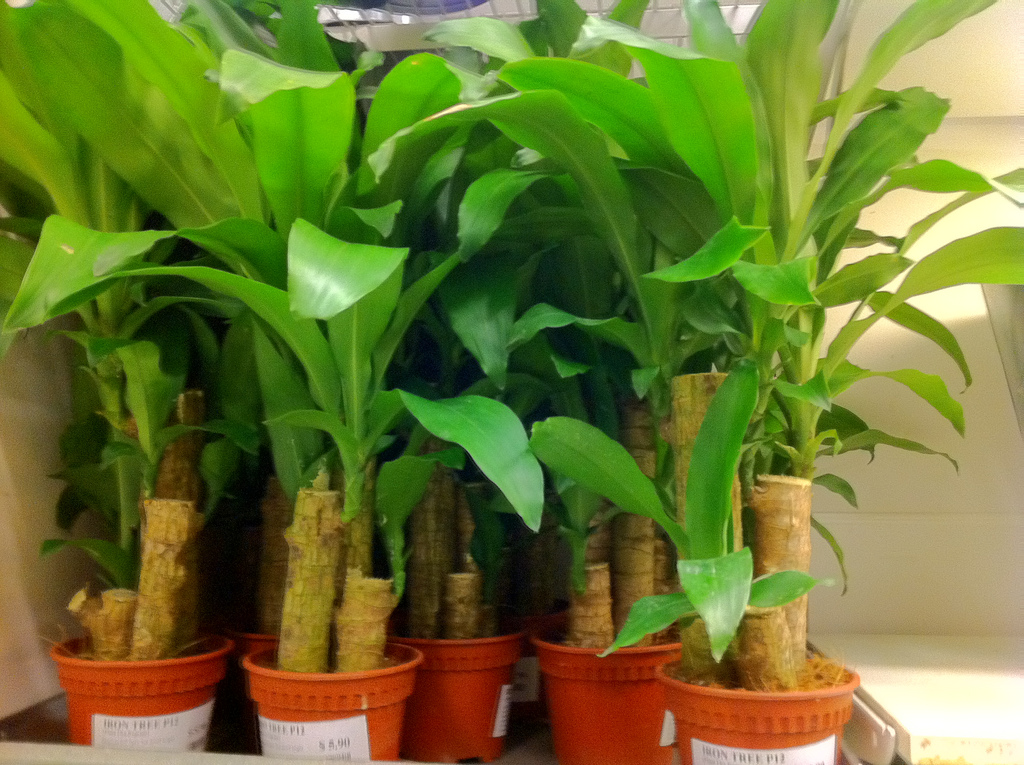

Scientific classification
- Kingdom: Plantae
- Clade: Tracheophytes
- Clade: Angiosperms
- Clade: Monocots
- Order: Asparagales
- Family: Asparagaceae
- Subfamily: Convallarioideae
- Genus: Dracaena
- Species: D. fragrans

Binomial name
- Dracaena fragrans (L.) Ker Gawl.

Synonyms
- Dracaena deremensis

= Dracaena fragrans =

Species of flowering plant

Dracaena fragrans (cornstalk dracaena), is a flowering plant species that is native to tropical Africa, from Sudan south to Mozambique, west to Côte d'Ivoire and southwest to Angola, growing in upland regions at 600–2,250 m (1,970–7,380 ft) altitude.

== Description ==
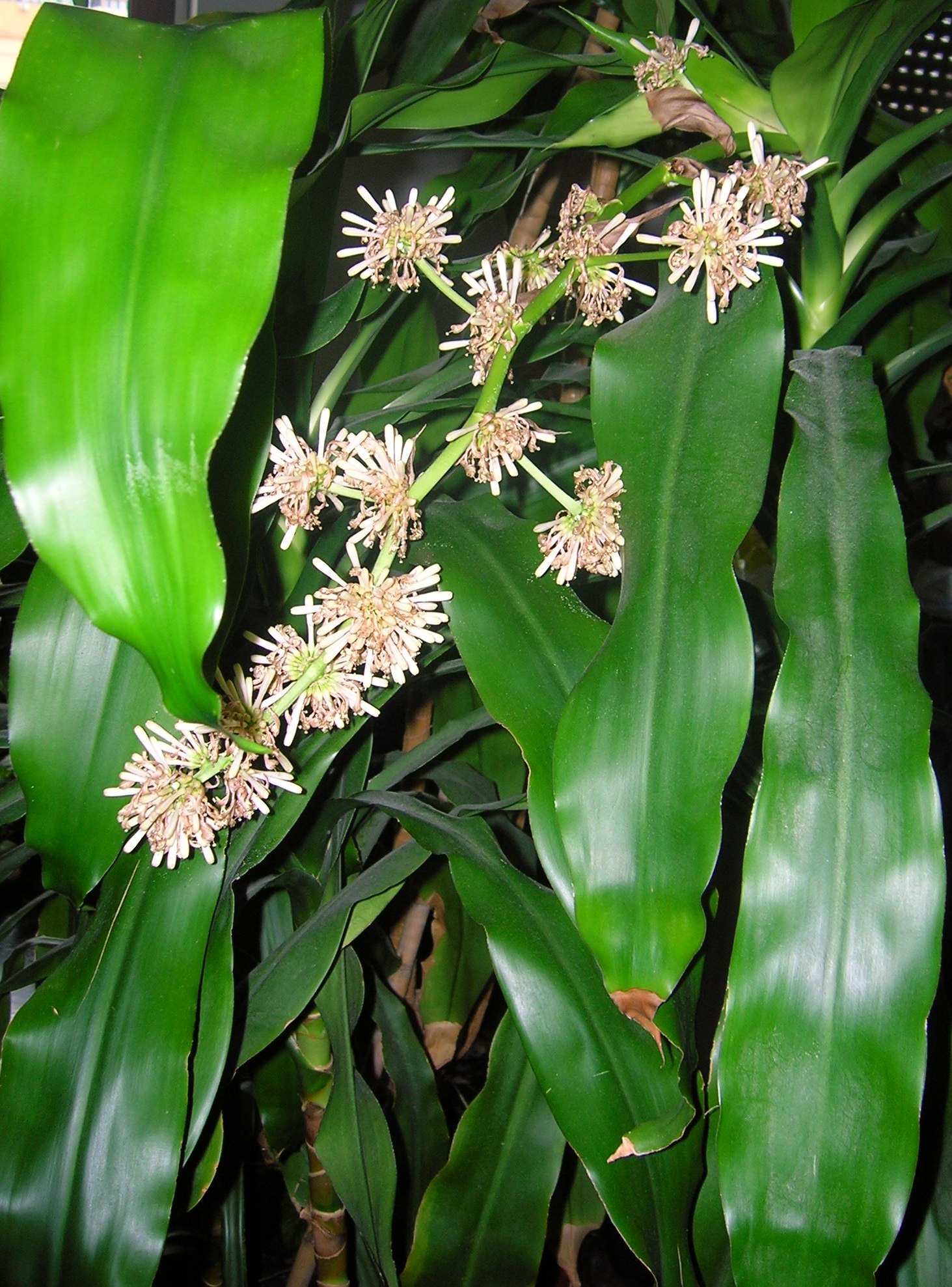
Foliage and flowers

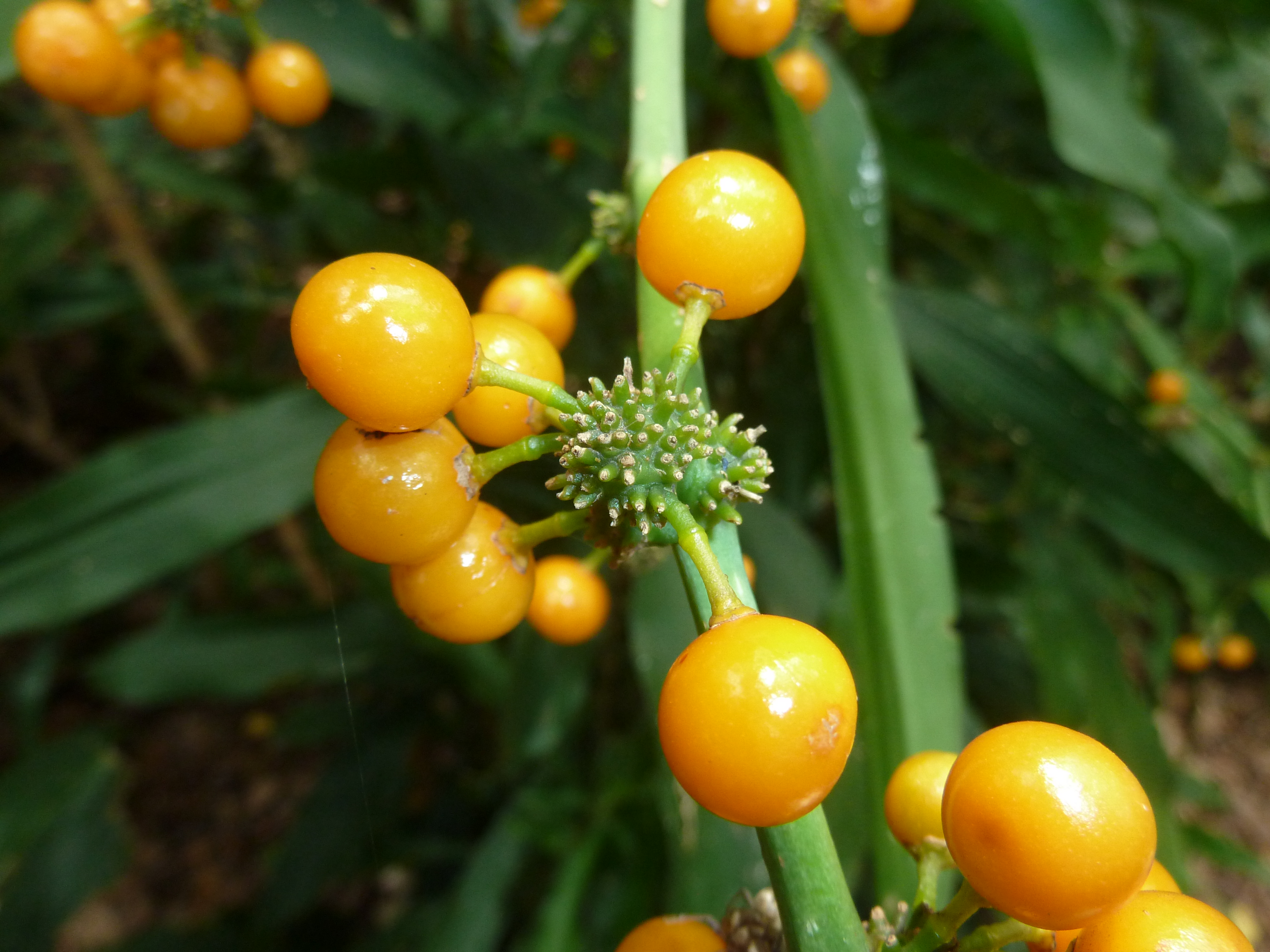
Fruit

Dracaena fragrans is a slow growing shrub, usually multistemmed at the base, mature specimens reaching 15 m (49 ft) or more with a narrow crown of usually slender erect branches. Stems may reach up to 30 cm (12 in) diameter on old plants; in forest habitats they may become horizontal with erect side branches. Young plants have a single unbranched stem with a rosette of leaves until the growing tip flowers or is damaged, after which it branches, producing two or more new stems; thereafter, branching increases with subsequent flowering episodes.

The leaves are glossy green, lanceolate, 20–150 cm (7.9–59.1 in) long and 2–12 cm (0.79–4.72 in) wide; small leaves are erect to spreading, and larger leaves usually drooping under their weight. The flowers are produced in panicles 15–160 cm (5.9–63.0 in) long, the individual flowers are 2.5 cm (0.98 in) diameter, with a six-lobed corolla, pink at first, opening white with a fine red or purple central line on each of the 7–12 mm (0.28–0.47 in) lobes; they are highly fragrant, and popular with pollinating insects. The fruit is an orange-red berry 1–2 cm (0.39–0.79 in) diameter, containing several seeds.

== Cultivation ==
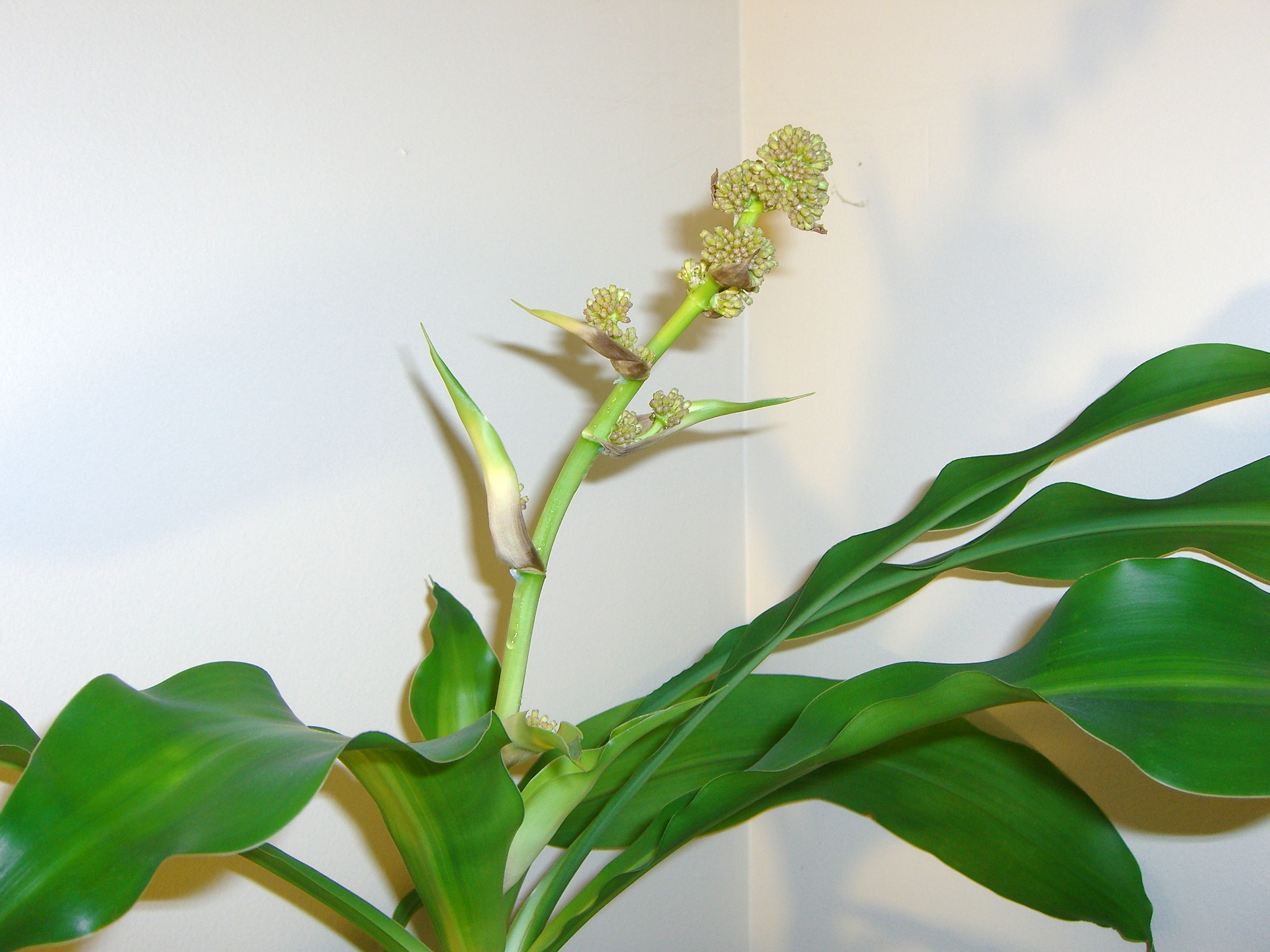
Inflorescence of Dracaena fragrans 'Massangeana'

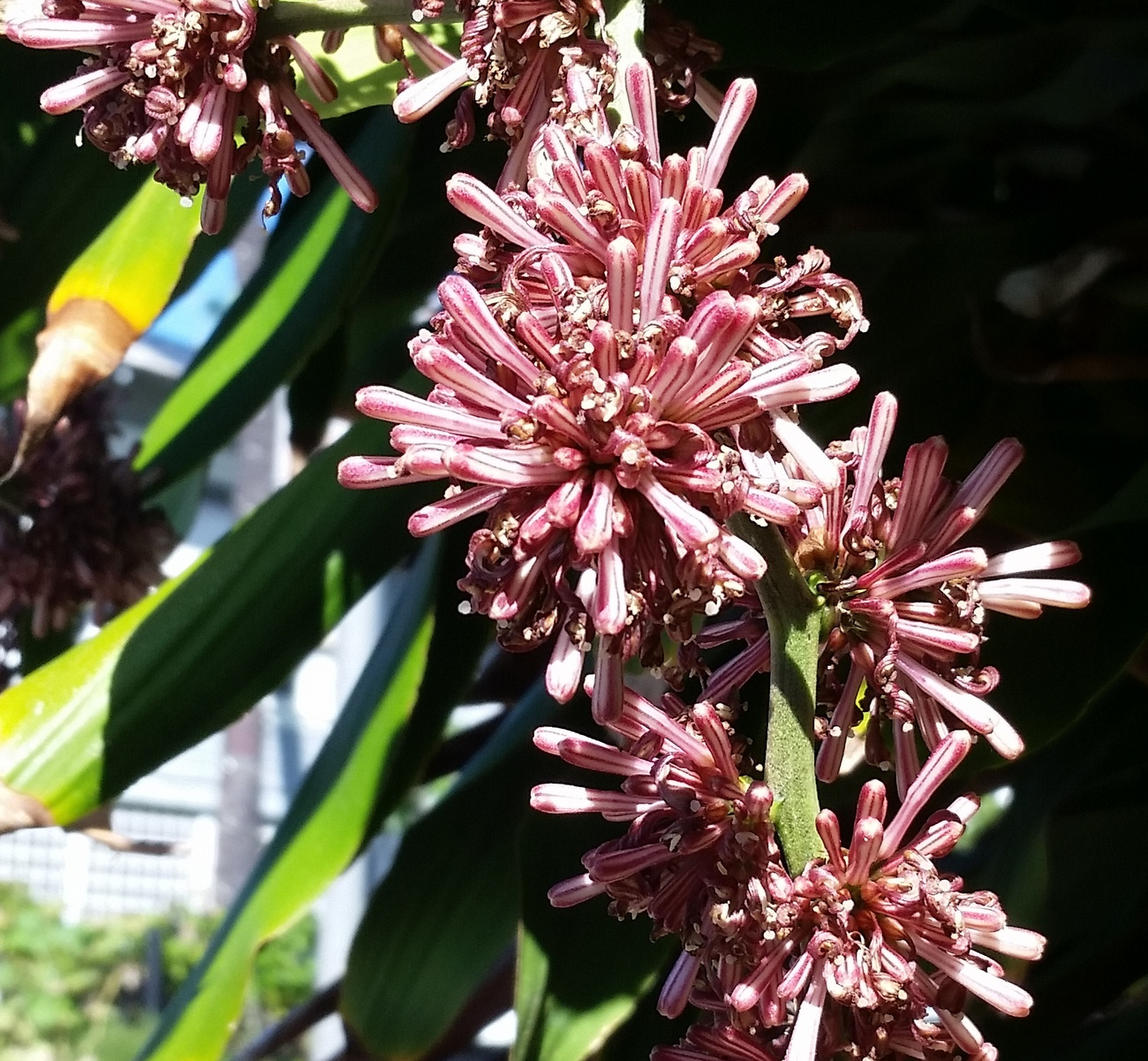
Dracaena fragrans 'Massangeana' in Honolulu, Hawaii, U.S.

In Africa, D. fragrans is commonly grown as a hedge plant. It is suited to frost-free climates and USDA Hardiness zones 10-11. Elsewhere, it is primarily popular as a houseplant and valued for its tolerance of a wide range of indoor conditions, from bright indirect light, to bright shade (which brings out more variegation in certain hybrids) and even deep shade (where it will have a darker green color). It is also very tolerant of neglect. The NASA Clean Air Study indicated that the plant aided removal of indoor pollutants such as formaldehyde, xylene, and toluene; however, these results were not applicable to typical buildings, where outdoor-to-indoor air exchange already removes volatile organic compounds at a rate that could only be matched by the placement of 10–1000 plants/m^{2} of a building's floor space.

The plant is known as "masale" to the Chagga people of Tanzania, who regard it as holy.

In cultivation, in the Neotropics, a few generalist hummingbird species, like the sapphire-spangled emerald (Chionomesa lactea), visit the flowers.

=== Cultivars ===
Several cultivars have variegated foliage. 'Massangeana' (also commonly called "Mass Cane"), has a bright-yellow central stripe on the foliage. 'Compacta' is more compact and suitable for indoor cultivation, with smaller, flatter and slightly pointed leaves. Some of the most popular cultivars include 'Janet Craig', 'Lemon Lime', and 'Warneckei' ('Warneckii'), which are often sold under the synonym D. deremensis.

The cultivars 'Lemon Lime', 'Massangeana', and 'Warneckei' bear the Royal Horticultural Society's Award of Garden Merit.

=== Propagation ===
Dracaena fragrans can be propagated by cutting segments of old stems, about 10–20 cm (3.9–7.9 in) long, drying them in shade for a day, and then inserting them into moist perlite, sphagnum moss and/or sand, until they root. Signs of new root growth are usually indicated as new leaves emerging. Lateral, bushy stem growth (typically being two or three shoots) comes from old foliar scars, from the leaf "eyes" that are located growing up along the entire stem. Additionally, anywhere a cutting is made (at any point along the stem) is likely to be where new stems will form, where a leaf once grew.

== Etymology and synonymy ==
The species name refers to the fragrant flowers, while the English name derives from a perceived resemblance of the stem to a corn (Zea mays) stalk. Synonyms include Aletris fragrans L. (basionym), Cordyline fragrans (L.) Planch., Pleomele fragrans (L.) Salisb., Sansevieria fragrans (L.) Jacq., Dracaena deremensis Engl., Dracaena smithii Hook.f., and Dracaena ugandensis Baker. Other English names include striped dracaena (for variegated cultivars), corn plant (for the cultivar 'Massangeana'); Chinese money tree, and fortune plant.

The plant is known as බෝතල් ගස් (bōthal gas, meaning 'bottle tree') in Sinhala, in Sri Lanka.
