= National Association of Landscape Professionals =

Membership organization

The National Association of Landscape Professionals, formerly known as the Professional Landcare Network (PLANET), is a professional body for lawn care professionals, landscape management professionals (exterior maintenance contractors), design/build/installation professionals, and interior plantscapers. The organization represents more than 100,000 landscape industry professionals, mainly in the United States.

== History ==
The Associated Landscape Contractors of America (ALCA) was founded in 1961. In collaboration with NASA, the ALCA sponsored the NASA Clean Air Study, which was published in 1989. After the study was published, the ALCA formed the Foliage for Clean Air Council, later renamed the Plants for Clean Air Council (PCAC), a nonprofit that promoted the use of plants in homes and offices. PCAC was dissolved in 2000 due to lack of funding.

In 1993, the ALCA established the Certified Landscape Professional (CLP) credential, which was later expanded into what is now the Landscape Industry Certified program.

The Professional Lawn Care Association of America (PLCAA) was founded in 1979. PLANET was formed on January 1, 2005, when the ALCA and the PLCAA merged. It was then rebranded as the National Association of Landscape Professionals on April 1, 2015.

== Courses and certification ==
Landscape Industry Certified is a broad distinction for individuals who have taken their experience and skills to the next level by studying, testing and becoming certified. Certificants must become recertified every 2 years.

=== Certifications offered ===
Landscape Technician Certification (offered in English and Spanish)

The Landscape Industry Certified Technician certification is designed for experienced and knowledgeable technicians working in softscape or hardscape installation, maintenance and/or irrigation.

Business Manager Certification

The Landscape Industry Certified Business Manager certification is designed for experienced and knowledgeable landscape business owners or managers, or those on the management fast-track.

=== Retired certifications ===
Horticulture Technician Certification, Lawn Care Technician Certification, Interior Technician Certification, and Lawn Care Manager Certification (now offered as the Principles of Turfgrass Management certificate course)

=== Online courses ===
Landscape Management Certificate

The Landscape Management Certificate Program foundational education in the areas of landscape installation services, irrigation, landscape maintenance and fundamentals. The coursework may be taken separately (1 specialty + Fundamentals) or as a bundle (3 specialty + Fundamentals).

Principles of Turfgrass Management Certificate

In a partnership between NALP and the University of Georgia, lawn care and turfgrass professionals can enroll in the Principles of Turfgrass Management Certificate Program (formerly called the Lawn Care Manager Certification) and expand their knowledge in all aspects of turf management.

== Events ==
The association hosts a number of educational events throughout the year. These include Renewal and Remembrance at Arlington National Cemetery and on the National Mall, the National Collegiate Landscape Competition, Leader's Forum, as well as hosting ELEVATE - the national conference for landscape and lawn care professionals.

== See also ==
- American Association of Geographers
