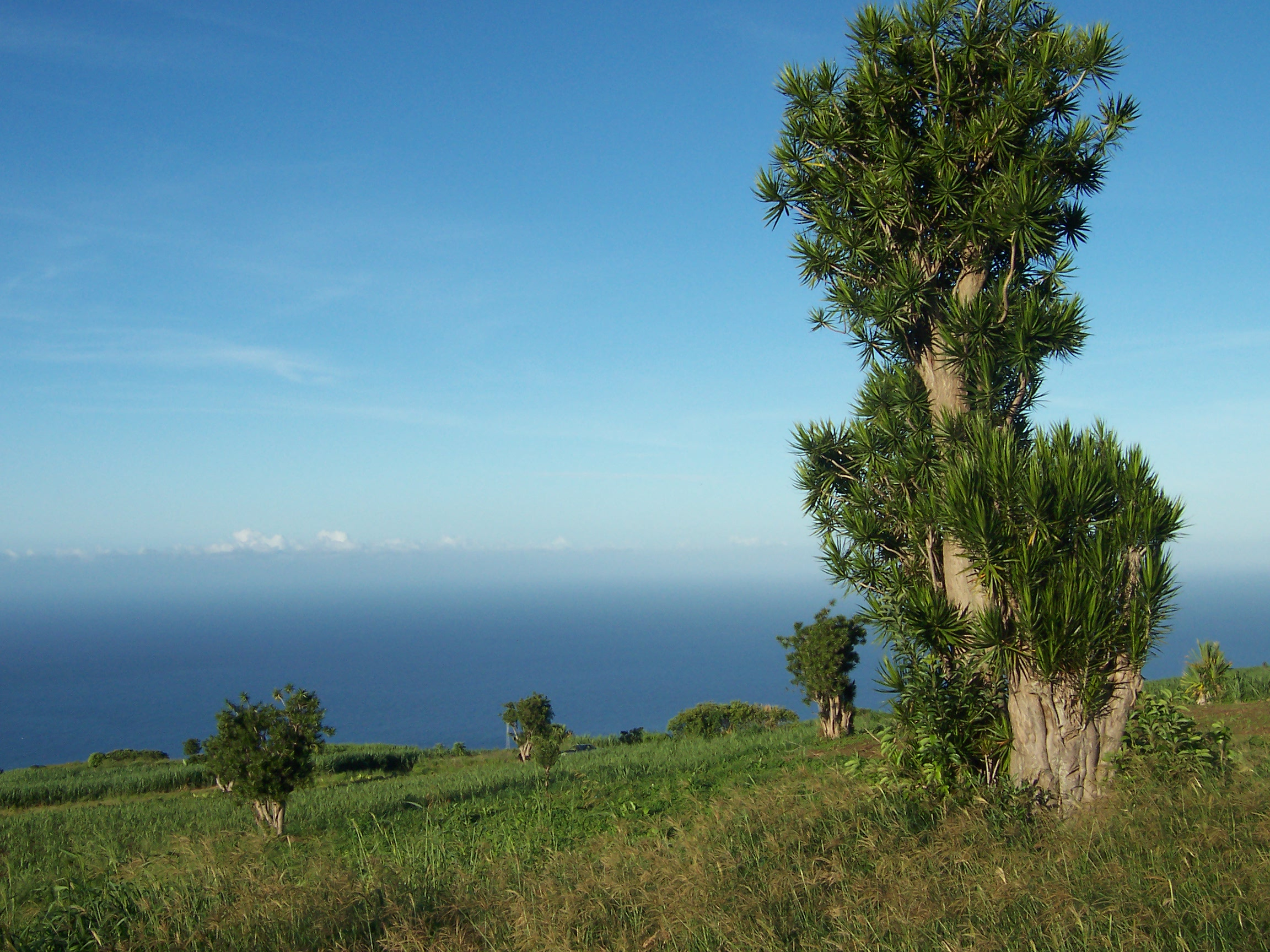
- Mature specimens on Réunion

Conservation status
- Least Concern (IUCN 3.1)

Scientific classification
- Kingdom: Plantae
- Clade: Tracheophytes
- Clade: Angiosperms
- Clade: Monocots
- Order: Asparagales
- Family: Asparagaceae
- Subfamily: Convallarioideae
- Genus: Dracaena
- Species: D. reflexa

Binomial name
- Dracaena reflexa Lam.

Synonyms
- Cordyline reflexa (Lam.) Endl.; Dracaena reflexa var. typica Baker; Draco reflexa (Lam.) Kuntze; Pleomele reflexa (Lam.) N.E.Br.; Lomatophyllum reflexum (Lam.) Bojer

= Dracaena reflexa =

Species of flowering plant

Dracaena reflexa (commonly called song of India or song of Jamaica) is a tree native to Mozambique, Madagascar, Mauritius, and other nearby islands of the Indian Ocean. It is widely grown as an ornamental plant and houseplant, valued for its richly coloured, evergreen leaves, and thick, irregular stems.

== Description ==
While it may reach a height of 4–5 m, rarely 6 m in ideal, protected locations, D. reflexa is usually much smaller, especially when grown as a houseplant. It is slow-growing and upright in habit, tending to an oval shape. The lanceolate leaves are simple, spirally arranged, 5–20 cm long and 1.5–5 cm broad at the base, with a parallel venation and entire margin; they grow in tight whorls and are a uniform dark green.

The flowers are small, clustered, usually white and extremely fragrant, appearing in mid winter. Neither the flowers nor the fruit are especially showy. D. reflexa var. angustifolia (syn. D. marginata) differs in having a magenta tint to its flowers, a shrubby habit, and olive green leaves.

== Taxonomy ==
Dracaena reflexa was first described by Jean-Baptiste Lamarck in 1786. It has been placed in several other related genera, including Cordyline and Pleomele.

=== Varieties ===
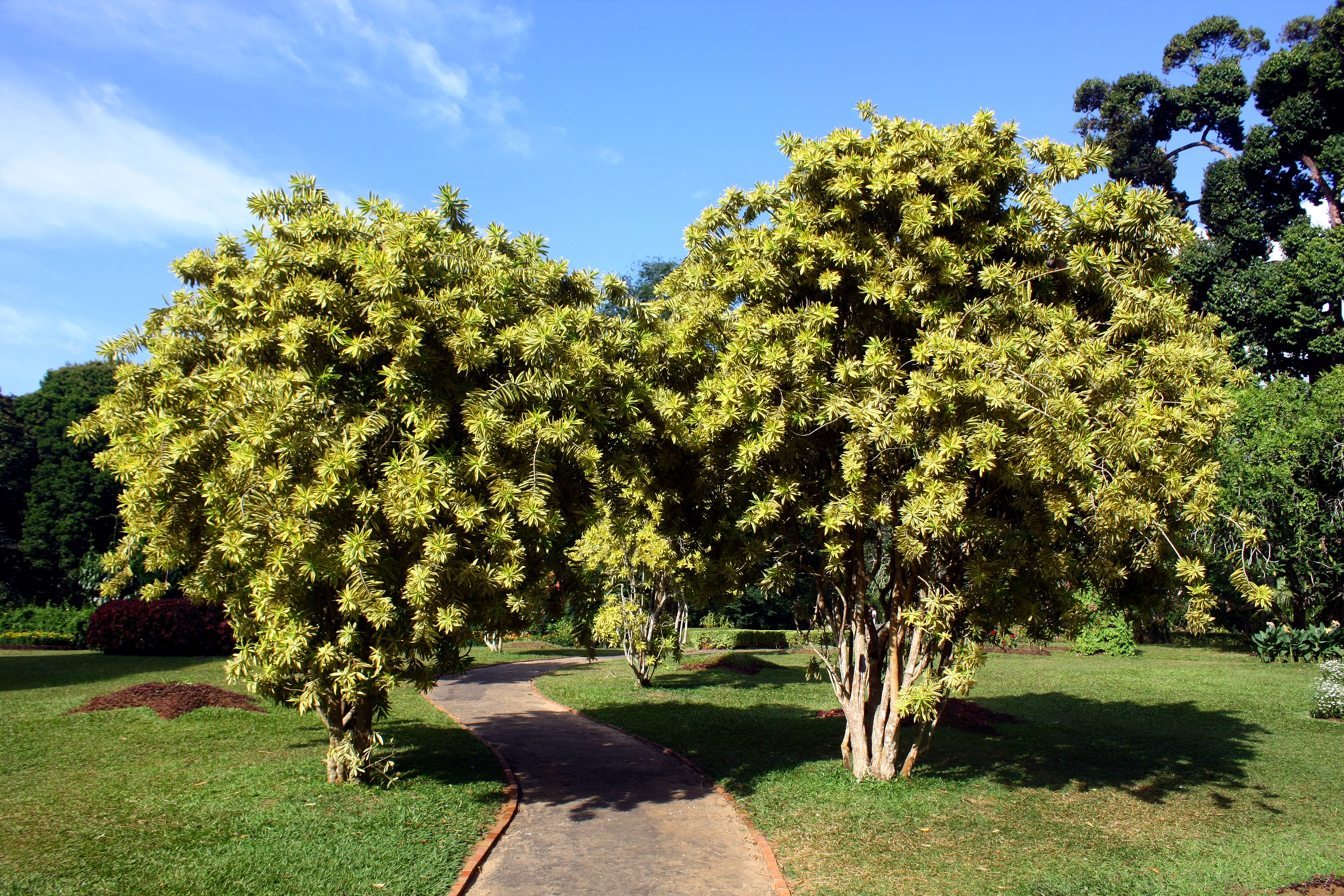
Dracaena reflexa var. variegata at Royal Botanical Gardens, Peradeniya, Sri Lanka

As of January 2026, Plants of the World Online accepts the following 13 varieties:

- Dracaena reflexa var. angustifolia Baker – western Indian Ocean islands
- Dracaena reflexa var. bakeri (Scott Elliot) H.Perrier – south-east Madagascar
- Dracaena reflexa var. brevituba H.Perrier – central Madagascar
- Dracaena reflexa var. condensata H.Perrier – south-east Madagascar
- Dracaena reflexa var. lanceolata H.Perrier – Madagascar
- Dracaena reflexa var. linearifolia Ayres ex Baker – Mascarenes, Madagascar
- Dracaena reflexa var. nervosa H.Perrier – Madagascar
- Dracaena reflexa var. occidentalis H.Perrier – west and south-west Madagascar
- Dracaena reflexa var. parvifolia Thouars ex H.Perrier – east Madagascar
- Dracaena reflexa var. reflexa – north-east Mozambique, western Indian Ocean islands
- Dracaena reflexa var. salicifolia (Regel) Baker – Madagascar
- Dracaena reflexa var. subcapitata H.Perrier – east Madagascar
- Dracaena reflexa var. subelliptica H.Perrier – east Madagascar

== Cultivation and uses ==
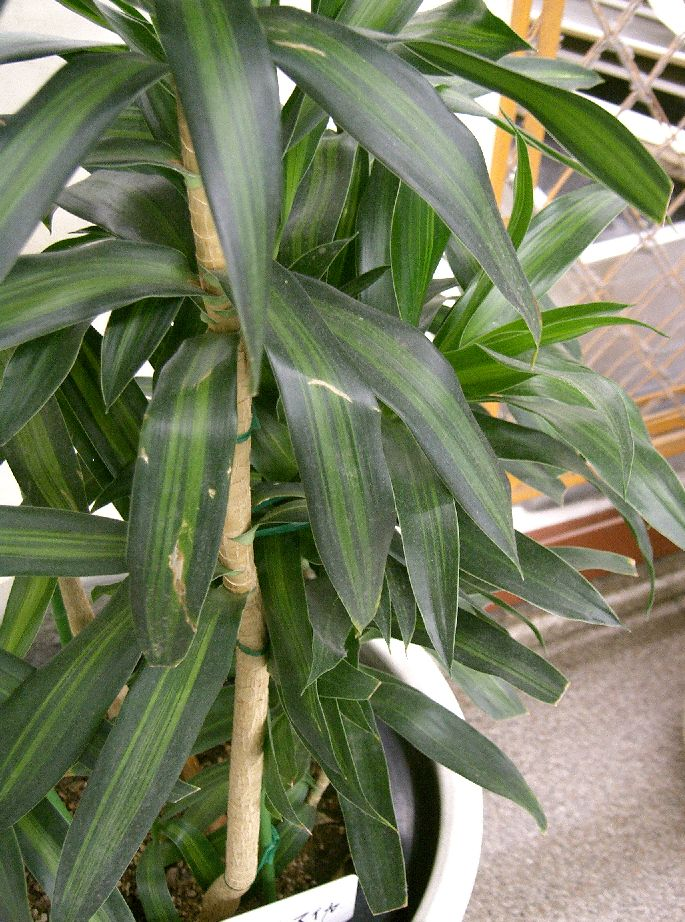
Dracaena reflexa: Song of Jamaica

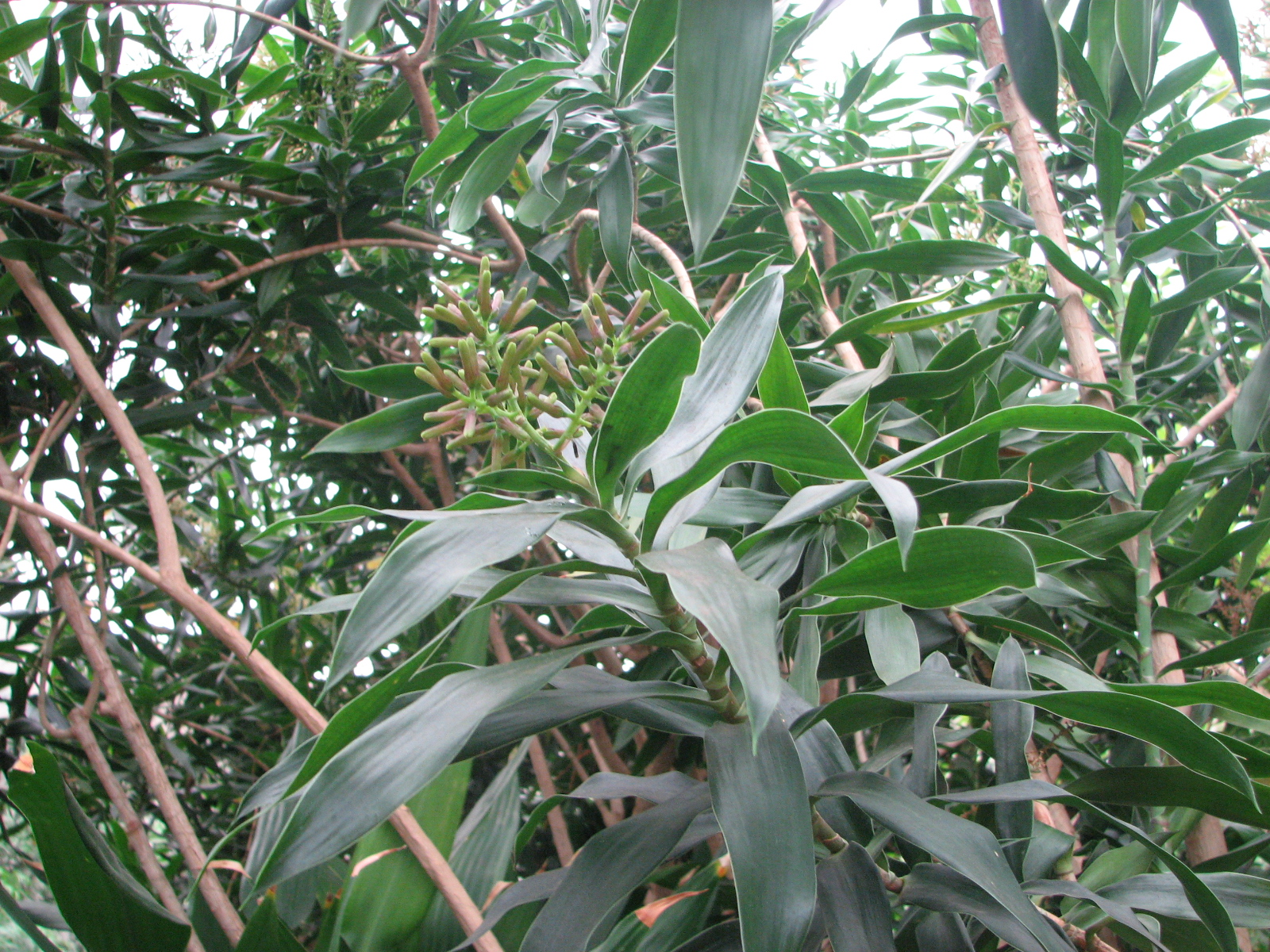
Specimen at North Carolina Zoo

Dracaena reflexa is a popular ornamental plant, both in the landscape and the home. It can be enjoyed as a specimen plant, accent, or pruned to create a border. Several cultivars have been selected, particularly variegated clones with cream and yellow-green margins. It performs well as a houseplant, tolerating infrequent waterings. It prefers bright, filtered light, without direct sun exposure, restricted outdoors to zones 10–11. It has average water needs and should be fertilized bi-weekly when actively growing. Although it can survive in relatively low light levels, the plant may grow spindly if given insufficient light. When grown indoors, temperatures of 18 to 25 °C (64 to 77 °F) should be maintained. It can be propagated via herbaceous stem cuttings.

The cultivar Dracaena reflexa 'Variegata' has gained the Royal Horticultural Society's Award of Garden Merit. (confirmed 2017)

Traditional medicine practitioners of Madagascar have long believed Dracaena reflexa to cure malarial symptoms, poisoning, dysentery, diarrhea, dysmenorrhea, and to be useful as an antipyretic and hemostatic agent. The leaves and bark are mixed with parts of a number of other native plants and mixed into herbal teas. Its effectiveness in any such treatment remains unproven.

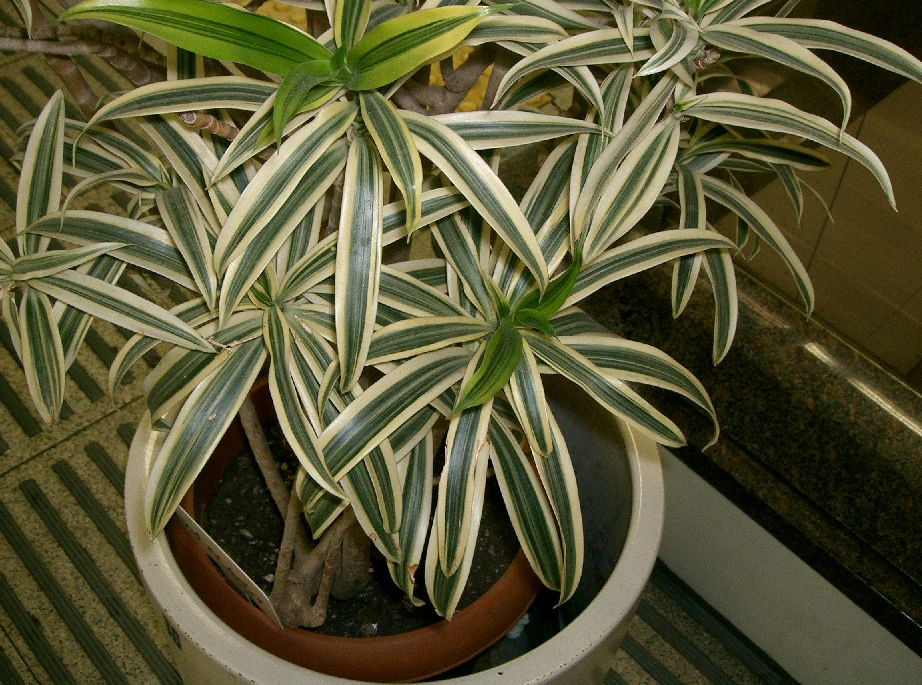
Dracaena reflexa: Song of India

The fruit of D. reflexa is also important to the diet of the Malagasy black-and-white ruffed lemur (Varecia variegata variegata). The Frégate beetle (Polposipus herculeanus), an endangered species endemic to Frégate Island in the Seychelles, is also known to associate with this plant.

== Dracaena reflexa var. angustifolia ==
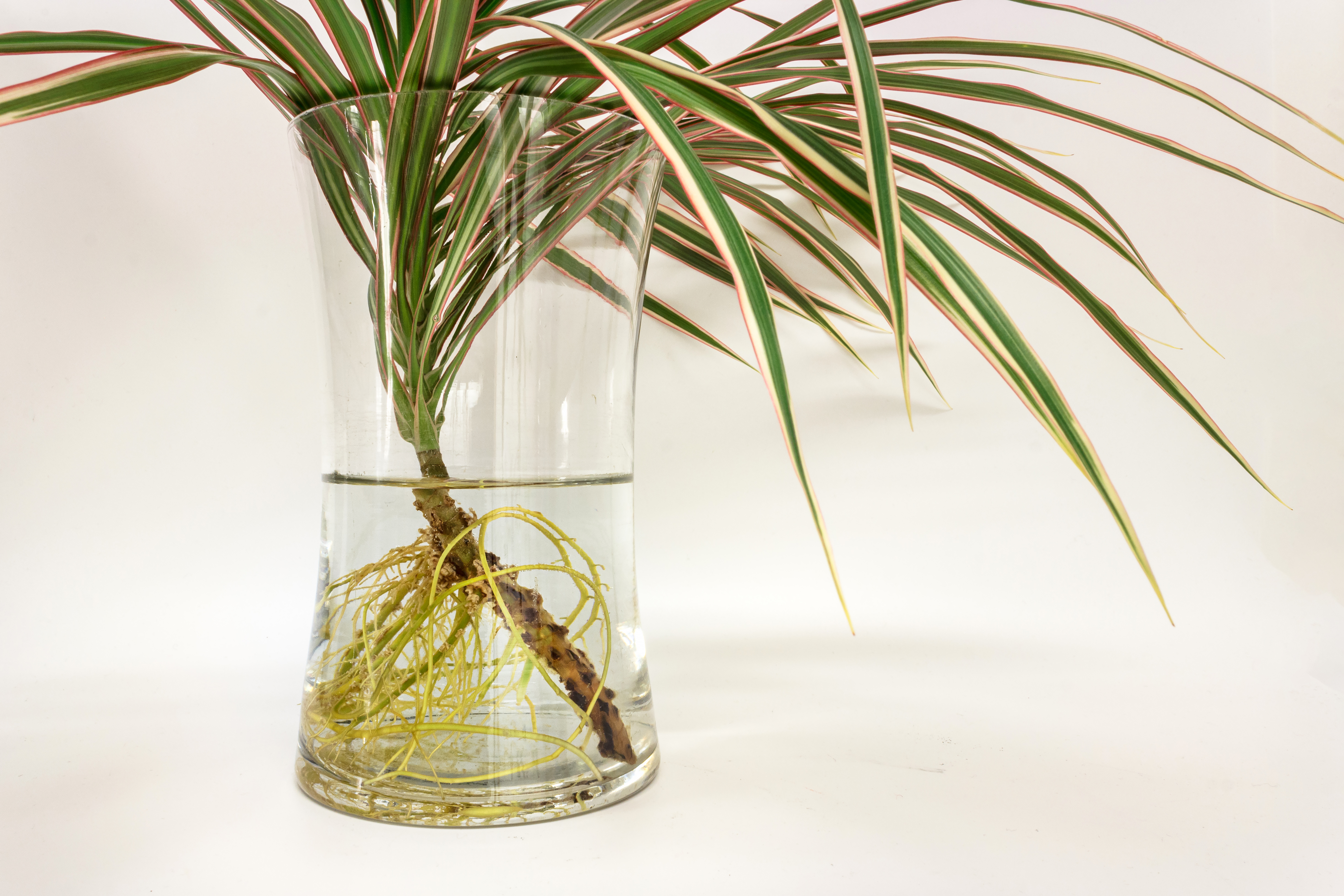
Roots of Dracaena reflexa var. angustifolia (Dracaena marginata 'Tricolor')

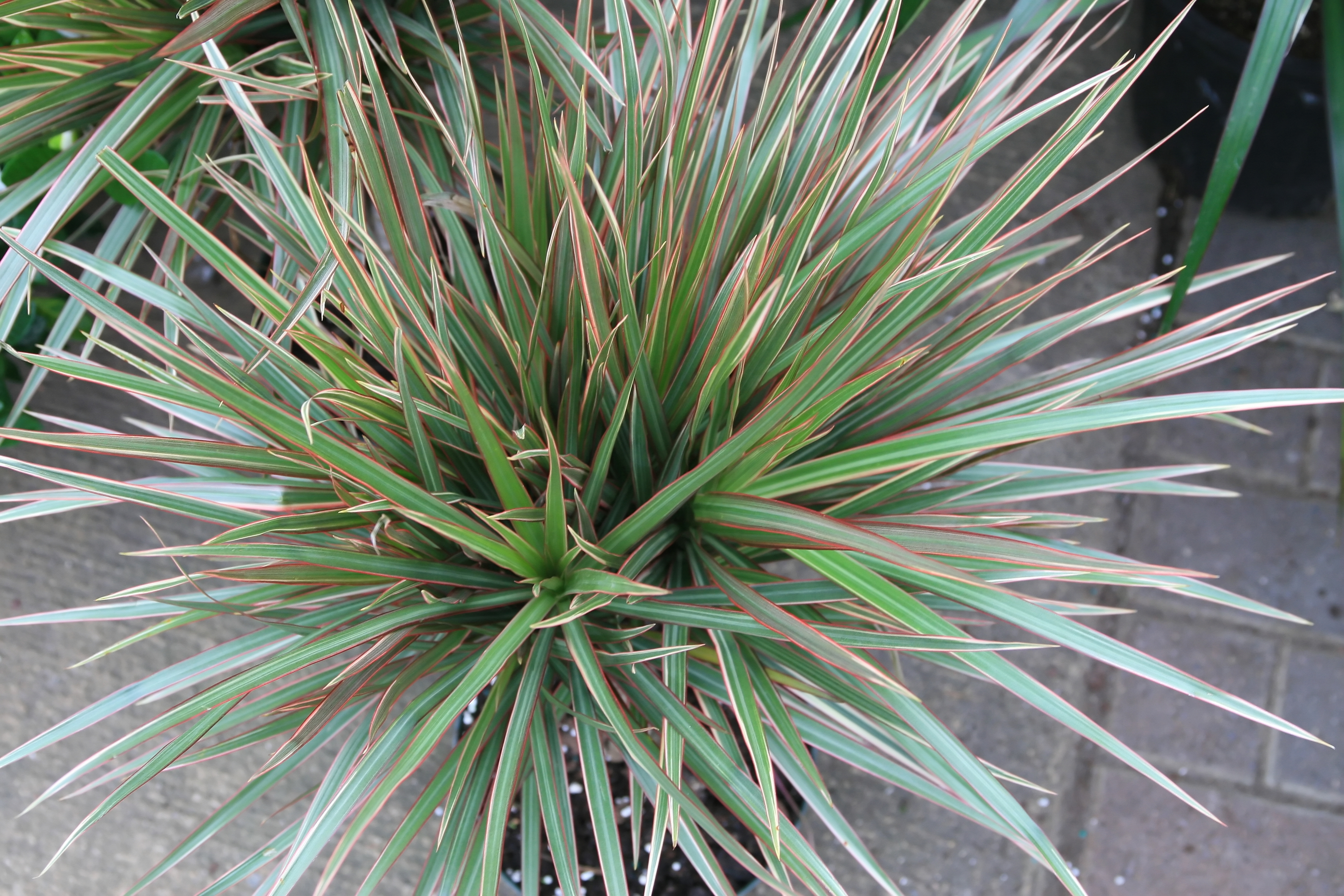
Dracaena tricolor

Dracaena reflexa var. angustifolia has the synonym D. marginata, and it is the latter name that is generally used in horticulture. This is a durable popular tropical house plant from Madagascar. The thin leaves are linear and a deep, glossy green color with red edges; typically 30–90 cm long and 2–7 cm broad, tapering to an acuminate point. It is a popular houseplant that needs little attention, with several cultivars available with the leaves variegated with red or pale yellow.

It requires a minimum temperature of 15 °C (59 °F), and is more tolerant than most plants of dry soil and irregular watering, though liable to root decay in permanently wet soil. Because it requires minimal care it is very popular in offices where the constant heat and light suits its growing requirements. They can grow between 2.5–4 meters in height and will ultimately spread between 1.5 and 2.5 meters.

There are many commonly used names to describe this variety that arise due to the various growth patterns and different cultivars. Some of the most popular are red edge dracaena, Madagascar dragon tree dracaena, dragon blood tree, and tree dracaena. With the variety of forms and cultivars, there are also some hybrid crosses that can arise as well.

The cultivar 'Tricolor' has gained the Royal Horticultural Society's Award of Garden Merit.

=== Versatility ===
The plant can be grown in virtually any pattern, with the most popular being bush, straight cane, staggered cane, tree form, and custom character forms. The variety also has a handful of different cultivars from selective breeding. These include 'Tarzan', 'Magenta', 'Tricolor', and 'Colorama'.

=== Uses ===
It is one of the plants used in the NASA Clean Air Study and has shown to help remove formaldehyde. It is an effective air cleaner and is said to be among the best plants for removing xylene and trichloroethylene.
