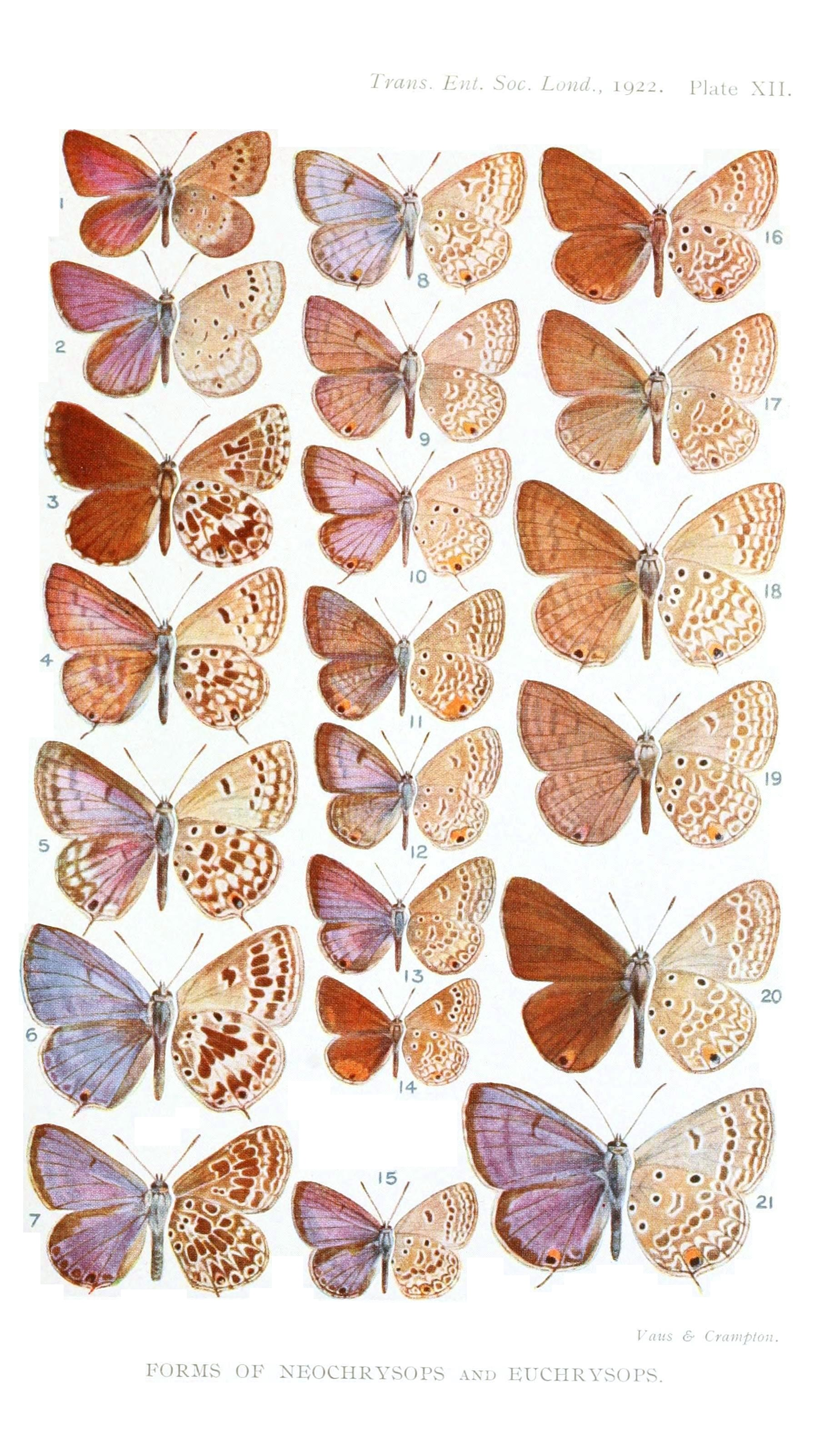
- Figure 3

Scientific classification
- Kingdom: Animalia
- Phylum: Arthropoda
- Class: Insecta
- Order: Lepidoptera
- Family: Lycaenidae
- Genus: Lepidochrysops
- Species: L. methymna

Binomial name
- Lepidochrysops methymna (Trimen, 1862)

Synonyms
- Lycaena methymna Trimen, 1862; Neochrysops methymna; Lepidochrysops major Murray, 1956

= Lepidochrysops methymna =

Species of butterfly

Lepidochrysops methymna, the monkey blue, is a butterfly of the family Lycaenidae. It is found in South Africa.

The wingspan is 35–40 mm for males and 33–42 mm for females. Adults are on wing from September to January, but it is most common in November and December.

The larvae feed on Selago fruticosa, Selago serrata and Selago spuria. Third and later instar larvae feed on the brood of Camponotus maculatus ants.

== Subspecies ==
- Lepidochrysops methymna methymna (Cape Peninsula)
- Lepidochrysops methymna dicksoni Tite, 1964 (Tygerberg Hills in the Western Cape)
