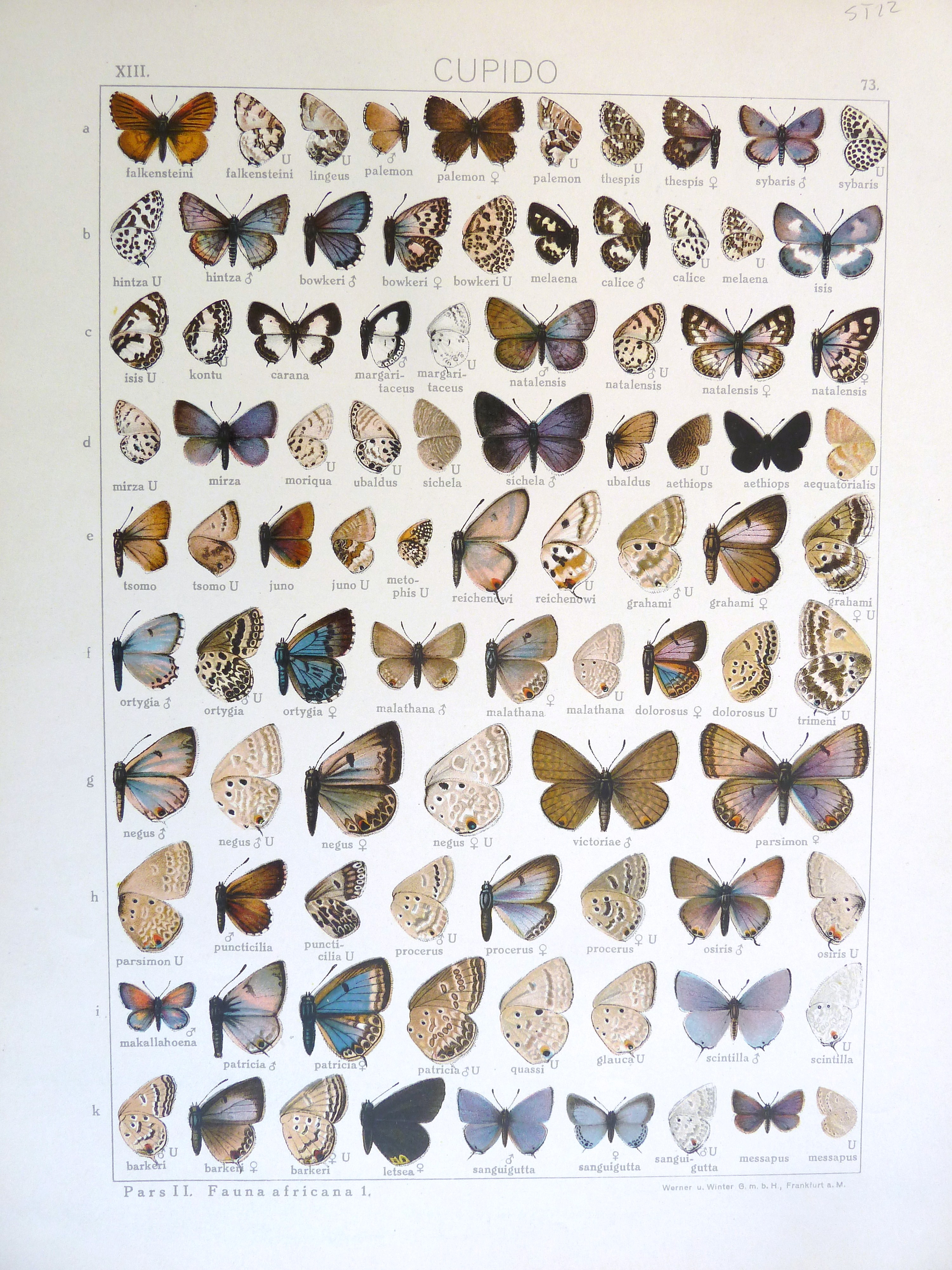
- h

Conservation status
- Least Concern (IUCN 3.1)

Scientific classification
- Kingdom: Animalia
- Phylum: Arthropoda
- Class: Insecta
- Order: Lepidoptera
- Family: Lycaenidae
- Genus: Lepidochrysops
- Species: L. puncticilia

Binomial name
- Lepidochrysops puncticilia (Trimen, 1883)

Synonyms
- Lycaena puncticilia Trimen, 1883; Neochrysops puncticilia

= Lepidochrysops puncticilia =

Species of butterfly

Lepidochrysops puncticilia, the mouse blue, is a butterfly of the family Lycaenidae. It is found in South Africa, where it is found in the Western Cape.

The wingspan is 27–29 mm for males and 27–30 mm for females. Adults are on wing from September to October in one generation at low altitudes and from October to December in mountainous areas.

The larvae feed on Selago fruticosa and Dichisma species.
