= Lepidochrysops dukei =

Conservation status
- Least Concern (IUCN 3.1)

Scientific classification
- Kingdom: Animalia
- Phylum: Arthropoda
- Class: Insecta
- Order: Lepidoptera
- Family: Lycaenidae
- Genus: Lepidochrysops
- Species: L. dukei

Binomial name
- Lepidochrysops dukei Cottrell, 1965

Species of butterfly

Lepidochrysops dukei, the Duke's blue, is a butterfly of the family Lycaenidae. It is found in South Africa, where it is found in the Western Cape.

The wingspan is about 28–29 mm. Adults are on wing from August to October on low altitudes and from mid-November to January at high altitudes. There is one extended generation per year.

The larvae feed on weevil galls on the flowers of Selago fruticosa.
