= Lepidochrysops quickelbergei =

Conservation status
- Least Concern (IUCN 3.1)

Scientific classification
- Kingdom: Animalia
- Phylum: Arthropoda
- Class: Insecta
- Order: Lepidoptera
- Family: Lycaenidae
- Genus: Lepidochrysops
- Species: L. quickelbergei

Binomial name
- Lepidochrysops quickelbergei Swanepoel, 1969

Species of butterfly

Lepidochrysops quickelbergei, the Quickelberge's blue, is a species of butterfly in the family Lycaenidae. It is endemic to South Africa, where it is found in fynbos on the northern slopes of the Gydo Mountain and the Waboomsberg in the Western Cape.

The wingspan is 32–36 mm for males and 36–38 mm for females. Adults are on wing from October to late December. There is one generation per year.
