= Lepidochrysops kennethi =

Scientific classification
- Kingdom: Animalia
- Phylum: Arthropoda
- Class: Insecta
- Order: Lepidoptera
- Family: Lycaenidae
- Genus: Lepidochrysops
- Species: L. kennethi

Binomial name
- Lepidochrysops kennethi Kielland, 1986

Species of butterfly

Lepidochrysops kennethi is a butterfly in the family Lycaenidae. It is found in Tanzania (the Iringa District). The habitat consists of montane grassland with stunted deciduous trees at altitudes between 1,800 and 2,000 meters.

Adults are on wing from late December to early January.
