= Lepidochrysops titei =

Conservation status
- Least Concern (IUCN 3.1)

Scientific classification
- Kingdom: Animalia
- Phylum: Arthropoda
- Class: Insecta
- Order: Lepidoptera
- Family: Lycaenidae
- Genus: Lepidochrysops
- Species: L. titei

Binomial name
- Lepidochrysops titei Dickson, 1976

Species of butterfly

Lepidochrysops titei, the Tite's blue, is a species of butterfly in the family Lycaenidae. It is endemic to South Africa, where it is found in the Western Cape.

The wingspan is 30–34 mm for males and 31–36 mm for females. Adults are on wing from September to November. There is one generation per year.

The larvae feed on Selago species.
