= Lepidochrysops grandis =

Scientific classification
- Kingdom: Animalia
- Phylum: Arthropoda
- Class: Insecta
- Order: Lepidoptera
- Family: Lycaenidae
- Genus: Lepidochrysops
- Species: L. grandis

Binomial name
- Lepidochrysops grandis Talbot, 1937

Species of butterfly

Lepidochrysops grandis is a butterfly in the family Lycaenidae. It is found on Madagascar (Tananarive and Fianarantsoa).
