= Lepidochrysops rhodesensae =

Scientific classification
- Kingdom: Animalia
- Phylum: Arthropoda
- Class: Insecta
- Order: Lepidoptera
- Family: Lycaenidae
- Genus: Lepidochrysops
- Species: L. rhodesensae

Binomial name
- Lepidochrysops rhodesensae (Bethune-Baker, [1923])

Synonyms
- Neochrysops rhodesensae Bethune-Baker, [1923]

Species of butterfly

Lepidochrysops rhodesensae is a butterfly in the family Lycaenidae. It is found in eastern Zambia.

Adults have been recorded on wing in November.
