= Lepidochrysops turlini =

Scientific classification
- Kingdom: Animalia
- Phylum: Arthropoda
- Class: Insecta
- Order: Lepidoptera
- Family: Lycaenidae
- Genus: Lepidochrysops
- Species: L. turlini

Binomial name
- Lepidochrysops turlini Stempffer, 1971

Species of butterfly

Lepidochrysops turlini is a butterfly in the family Lycaenidae. It is found on Madagascar. The habitat consists of forests.
