= Lepidochrysops auratus =

Scientific classification
- Kingdom: Animalia
- Phylum: Arthropoda
- Class: Insecta
- Order: Lepidoptera
- Family: Lycaenidae
- Genus: Lepidochrysops
- Species: L. auratus

Binomial name
- Lepidochrysops auratus Quickelberge, 1979

Species of butterfly

Lepidochrysops auratus is a butterfly in the family Lycaenidae. It is found in Malawi and Zambia. The habitat consists of Brachystegia woodland.

Adults are on wing in December.
