= Lepidochrysops ruthica =

Scientific classification
- Kingdom: Animalia
- Phylum: Arthropoda
- Class: Insecta
- Order: Lepidoptera
- Family: Lycaenidae
- Genus: Lepidochrysops
- Species: L. ruthica

Binomial name
- Lepidochrysops ruthica Pennington, 1953

Species of butterfly

Lepidochrysops ruthica, the Ruth's blue, is a butterfly in the family Lycaenidae. It is found in Zimbabwe (the Nyanga massif). The habitat consists of grassland.

Adults have been recorded on wing from mid-September to October, but they probably occur in all the warmer months.

The larvae are associated with ants of the genus Camponotus.
