= Lepidochrysops southeyae =

Conservation status
- Least Concern (IUCN 3.1)

Scientific classification
- Kingdom: Animalia
- Phylum: Arthropoda
- Class: Insecta
- Order: Lepidoptera
- Family: Lycaenidae
- Genus: Lepidochrysops
- Species: L. southeyae

Binomial name
- Lepidochrysops southeyae Pennington, 1967

Species of butterfly

Lepidochrysops southeyae, the Southey's blue, is a butterfly of the family Lycaenidae. It is found in South Africa, where it is found in Nama Karoo in the East Cape.

The wingspan is 27–30 mm for males and 28–32 mm for females. Adults are on wing from September to March. There are several generations per year, depending on rains.
