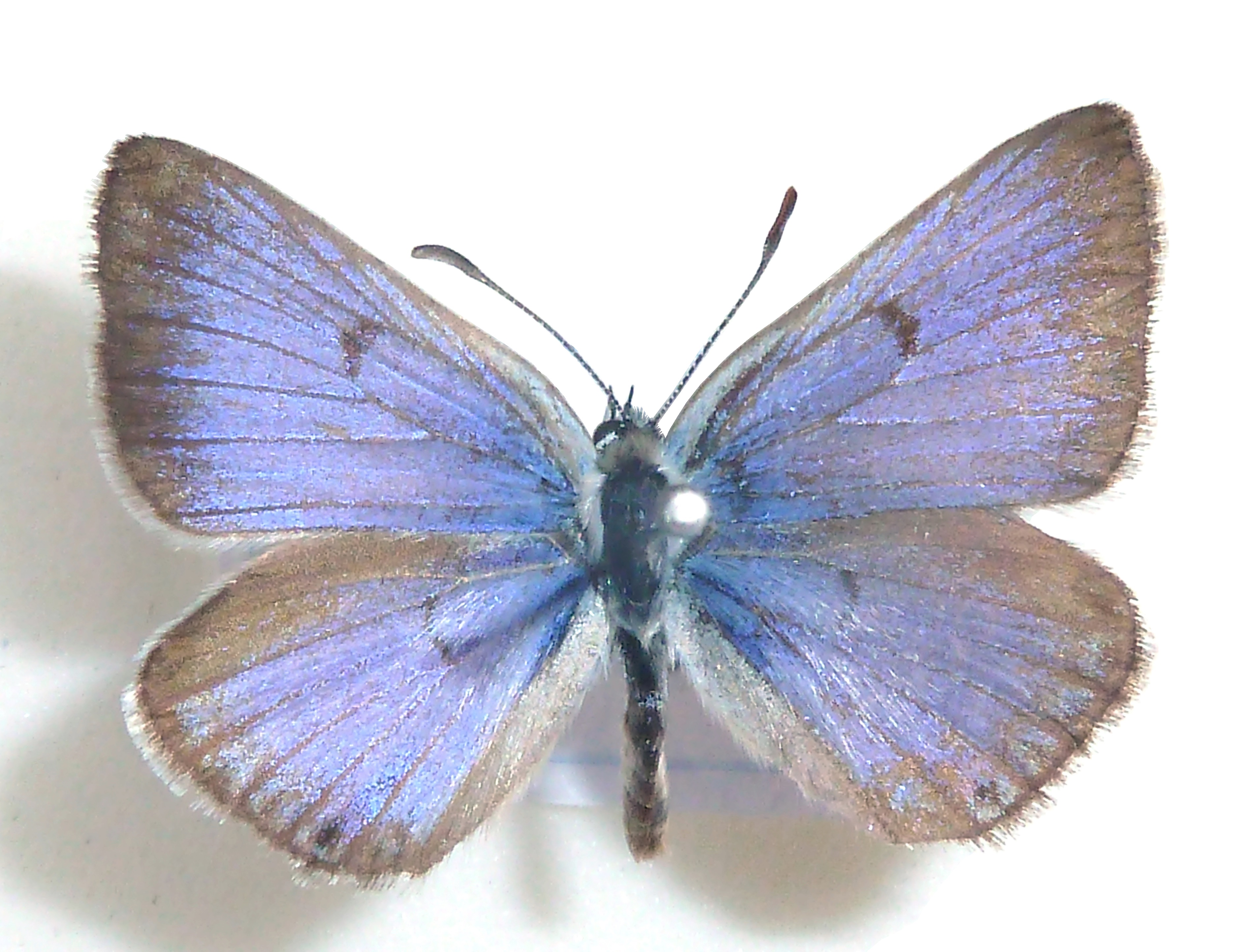

Conservation status
- Least Concern (IUCN 3.1)

Scientific classification
- Kingdom: Animalia
- Phylum: Arthropoda
- Class: Insecta
- Order: Lepidoptera
- Family: Lycaenidae
- Genus: Lepidochrysops
- Species: L. procera

Binomial name
- Lepidochrysops procera (Trimen, 1893)

Synonyms
- Lycaena procera Trimen, 1893; Catochrysops procera; Cupido procerus; Catochrysops procerus; Neochrysops procera

= Lepidochrysops procera =

Potchefstroom blue

Species of butterfly

Lepidochrysops procera, the Potchefstroom blue, is a butterfly of the family Lycaenidae. It is found in South Africa, where it is known from the KwaZulu-Natal midlands to Mpumalanga, Gauteng, Limpopo Province and North West.

The wingspan is 28–34 mm for males and 29–36 mm for females. Adults are on wing from September to November. There is one generation per year.

The larvae feed on Becium grandiflorum, Ocimum canum and Lippia scaberrima.
