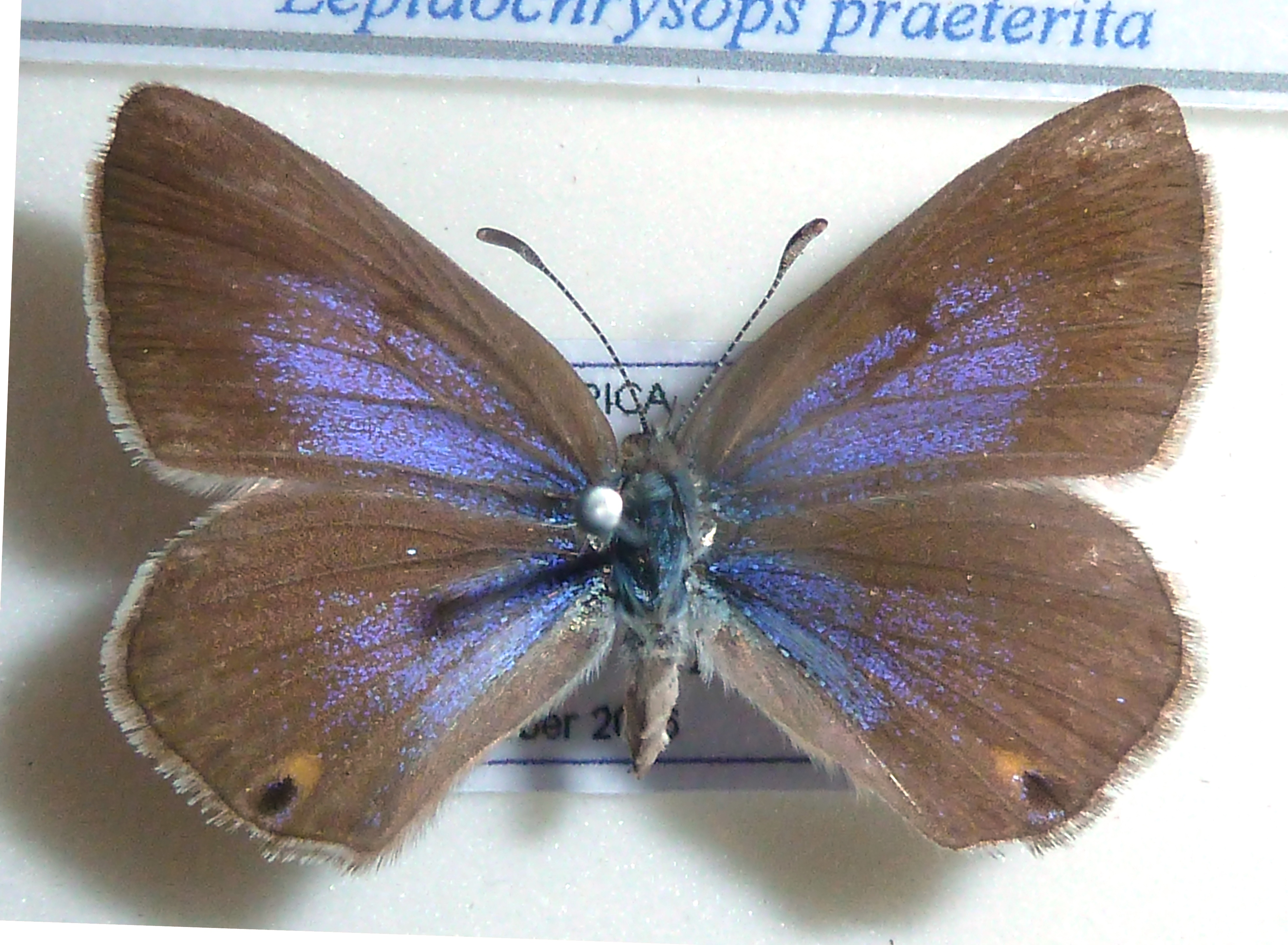

Conservation status
- Endangered (IUCN 3.1)

Scientific classification
- Kingdom: Animalia
- Phylum: Arthropoda
- Class: Insecta
- Order: Lepidoptera
- Family: Lycaenidae
- Genus: Lepidochrysops
- Species: L. praeterita

Binomial name
- Lepidochrysops praeterita Swanepoel, 1962

= Lepidochrysops praeterita =

Highveld blue

Species of butterfly

Lepidochrysops praeterita, the Highveld blue, is a butterfly of the family Lycaenidae. It is found in South Africa, from Potchefstroom in North West to Walkerville in Gauteng and Sasolburg in the Free State province.

The wingspan is 36–42 mm for males and 38–44 mm for females. Adults are on wing from early September to November. There is one generation per year.

The larvae feed on Becium grandiflorum.
