= Lepidochrysops ketsi =

Scientific classification
- Kingdom: Animalia
- Phylum: Arthropoda
- Class: Insecta
- Order: Lepidoptera
- Family: Lycaenidae
- Genus: Lepidochrysops
- Species: L. ketsi

Binomial name
- Lepidochrysops ketsi Cottrell, 1965

Species of butterfly

Lepidochrysops ketsi, the ketsi blue, is a butterfly of the family Lycaenidae. It is found in South Africa.

The wingspan is 32–35 mm for males and 32–33 mm for females. Adults are on wing from October to March, with peaks in November and January. There are two generations per year.

The larvae feed on Selago species, including S. corymbosa and S. geniculata and Salvia species.

== Subspecies ==
- Lepidochrysops ketsi ketsi (West Cape, along the East Cape mountains to Lesotho, the Orange Free State, the KwaZulu-Natal hills and highveld in Gauteng, Mpumalanga, the Limpopo Province and the North West Province)
- Lepidochrysops ketsi leucomacula Henning & Henning, 1994 (coastal grassland and savannah in the East Cape and KwaZulu-Natal)
