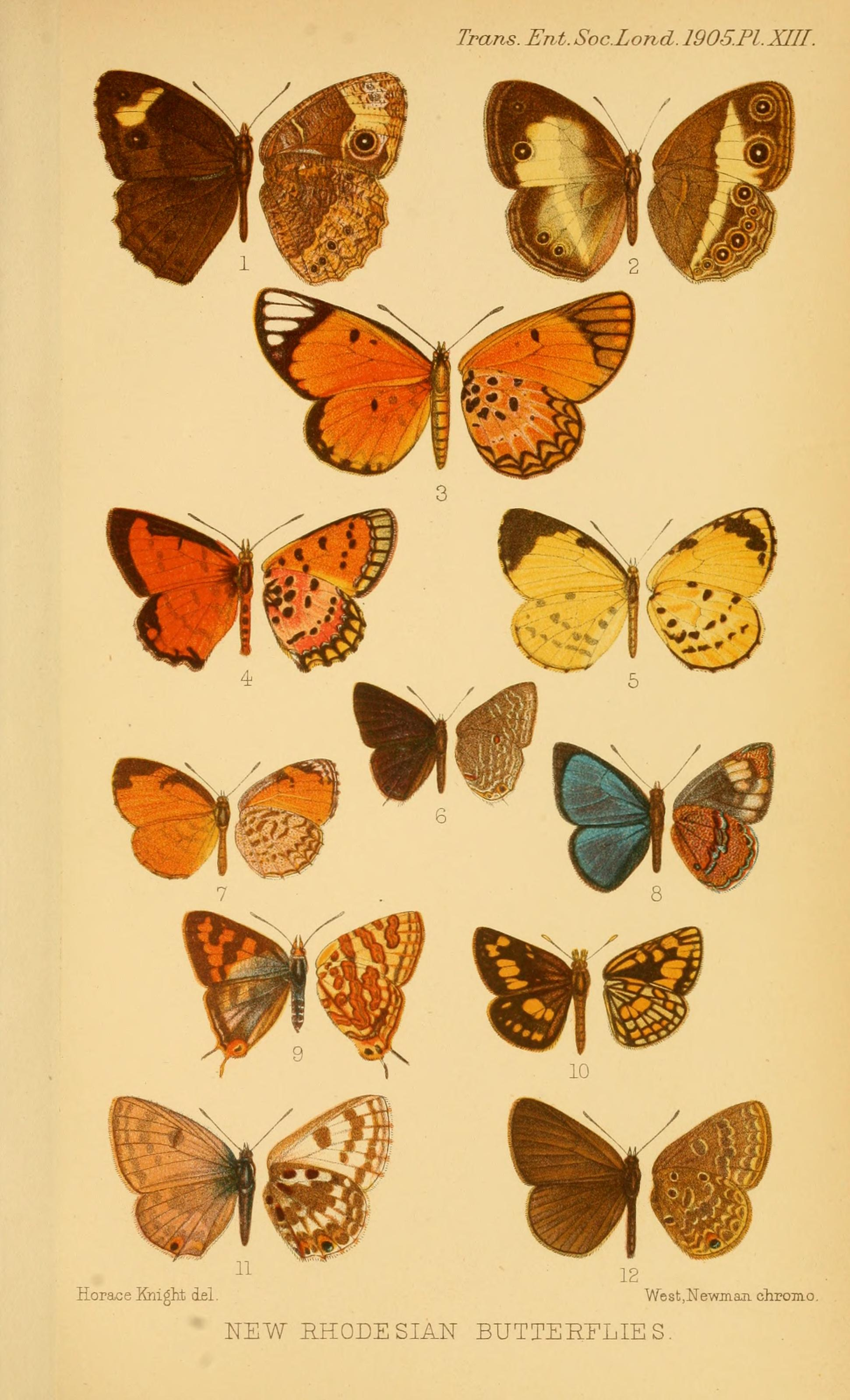
- Figure 11

Scientific classification
- Kingdom: Animalia
- Phylum: Arthropoda
- Class: Insecta
- Order: Lepidoptera
- Family: Lycaenidae
- Genus: Lepidochrysops
- Species: L. pampolis

Binomial name
- Lepidochrysops pampolis (H. H. Druce, 1905)

Synonyms
- Catochrysops pampolis H. H. Druce, 1905; Neochrysops pampolis

= Lepidochrysops pampolis =

Species of butterfly

Lepidochrysops pampolis is a butterfly in the family Lycaenidae first described by Hamilton Herbert Druce in 1905. It is found in the Democratic Republic of the Congo (Katanga Province), Malawi and northern Zambia.

Adults have been recorded on wing from October to December and in March.
