= Lepidochrysops australis =

Conservation status
- Least Concern (IUCN 3.1)

Scientific classification
- Kingdom: Animalia
- Phylum: Arthropoda
- Class: Insecta
- Order: Lepidoptera
- Family: Lycaenidae
- Genus: Lepidochrysops
- Species: L. australis

Binomial name
- Lepidochrysops australis Tite, 1964

Species of butterfly

Lepidochrysops australis, the southern blue, is a butterfly of the family Lycaenidae. It is found in South Africa, from the above Greyton and Caledon along the coastal ranges to the Eastern Cape.

The wingspan is 32–36 mm for males and 33–40 mm for females. Adults are on wing from November to March. There is one or possibly two generations per year.

The larvae feed on Selago species.
