= Lepidochrysops dunni =

Scientific classification
- Kingdom: Animalia
- Phylum: Arthropoda
- Class: Insecta
- Order: Lepidoptera
- Family: Lycaenidae
- Genus: Lepidochrysops
- Species: L. dunni

Binomial name
- Lepidochrysops dunni Larsen & Collins, 2003

Species of butterfly

Lepidochrysops dunni, the Boorman's giant Cupid, is a butterfly in the family Lycaenidae. It is found in Nigeria. The habitat consists of Guinea savanna.

Adults have been recorded in May.
