= Lepidochrysops jacksoni =

Scientific classification
- Kingdom: Animalia
- Phylum: Arthropoda
- Clade: Pancrustacea
- Class: Insecta
- Order: Lepidoptera
- Family: Lycaenidae
- Genus: Lepidochrysops
- Species: L. jacksoni

Binomial name
- Lepidochrysops jacksoni van Someren, 1957

Species of butterfly

Lepidochrysops jacksoni is a butterfly in the family Lycaenidae. It is found in Uganda, from the south-western part of the country to Tororo and to the north and West Madi. The habitat consists of areas with short grass and flowers of the family Lamiaceae on the rocky slopes of hills and ridges.
