= Lepidochrysops handmani =

Scientific classification
- Kingdom: Animalia
- Phylum: Arthropoda
- Class: Insecta
- Order: Lepidoptera
- Family: Lycaenidae
- Genus: Lepidochrysops
- Species: L. handmani

Binomial name
- Lepidochrysops handmani Quickelberge, 1980

Species of butterfly

Lepidochrysops handmani is a butterfly in the family Lycaenidae. It is found in Malawi and Zambia. The habitat consists of montane grassland with long grass at altitudes between 1,980 and 2,195 meters.

Adults are on wing from mid-September to the end of November.
