= Lepidochrysops pringlei =

Conservation status
- Least Concern (IUCN 3.1)

Scientific classification
- Kingdom: Animalia
- Phylum: Arthropoda
- Class: Insecta
- Order: Lepidoptera
- Family: Lycaenidae
- Genus: Lepidochrysops
- Species: L. pringlei

Binomial name
- Lepidochrysops pringlei Dickson, 1982

Species of butterfly

Lepidochrysops pringlei, the Pringle's blue, is a species of butterfly in the family Lycaenidae. It is endemic to South Africa, where it is restricted to the peaks of the Swartberg between Torenwater in the Eastern Cape and Seweweekspoort in the Western Cape.

The wingspan is 30–34 mm for males and 36–38 mm for females. Adults are on wing from early October to late November. There is one generation per year.
