= Lepidochrysops nigritia =

Scientific classification
- Kingdom: Animalia
- Phylum: Arthropoda
- Class: Insecta
- Order: Lepidoptera
- Family: Lycaenidae
- Genus: Lepidochrysops
- Species: L. nigritia

Binomial name
- Lepidochrysops nigritia Tite, 1959

Synonyms
- Lepidochrysops nigrita

Species of butterfly

Lepidochrysops nigritia is a butterfly in the family of Lycaenidae. It is native to South Sudan.
