= Lepidochrysops nacrescens =

Scientific classification
- Kingdom: Animalia
- Phylum: Arthropoda
- Class: Insecta
- Order: Lepidoptera
- Family: Lycaenidae
- Genus: Lepidochrysops
- Species: L. nacrescens

Binomial name
- Lepidochrysops nacrescens Tite, 1961

Species of butterfly

Lepidochrysops nacrescens is a butterfly in the family Lycaenidae. It is found in Angola.

Adults have been recorded on wing in September.
