= Lepidochrysops penningtoni =

Conservation status
- Data Deficient (IUCN 3.1)

Scientific classification
- Kingdom: Animalia
- Phylum: Arthropoda
- Class: Insecta
- Order: Lepidoptera
- Family: Lycaenidae
- Genus: Lepidochrysops
- Species: L. penningtoni

Binomial name
- Lepidochrysops penningtoni Dickson, 1969

Species of butterfly

Lepidochrysops penningtoni, the Pennington's blue, is a species of butterfly in the family Lycaenidae. It is endemic to South Africa, where it is found in the Succulent Karoo of the Northern Cape.

The wingspan is 28–34 mm for males and 34–36 mm for females. Adults are on wing from August to October. There is one generation per year, with the adults only emerging after rain.
