= Lepidochrysops abri =

Scientific classification
- Kingdom: Animalia
- Phylum: Arthropoda
- Class: Insecta
- Order: Lepidoptera
- Family: Lycaenidae
- Genus: Lepidochrysops
- Species: L. abri

Binomial name
- Lepidochrysops abri Libert & Collins, 2001

Species of butterfly

Lepidochrysops abri is a butterfly in the family Lycaenidae. It is found in Cameroon.
