= Lepidochrysops coxii =

Scientific classification
- Kingdom: Animalia
- Phylum: Arthropoda
- Class: Insecta
- Order: Lepidoptera
- Family: Lycaenidae
- Genus: Lepidochrysops
- Species: L. coxii

Binomial name
- Lepidochrysops coxii (Pinhey, 1945)

Synonyms
- Cupido (Lepidochrysops) coxii Pinhey, 1945

Species of butterfly

Lepidochrysops coxii, the Cox's blue, is a butterfly in the family Lycaenidae. It is found in eastern Zimbabwe. The habitat consists of grassland.

Adults have been recorded on wing in October.
