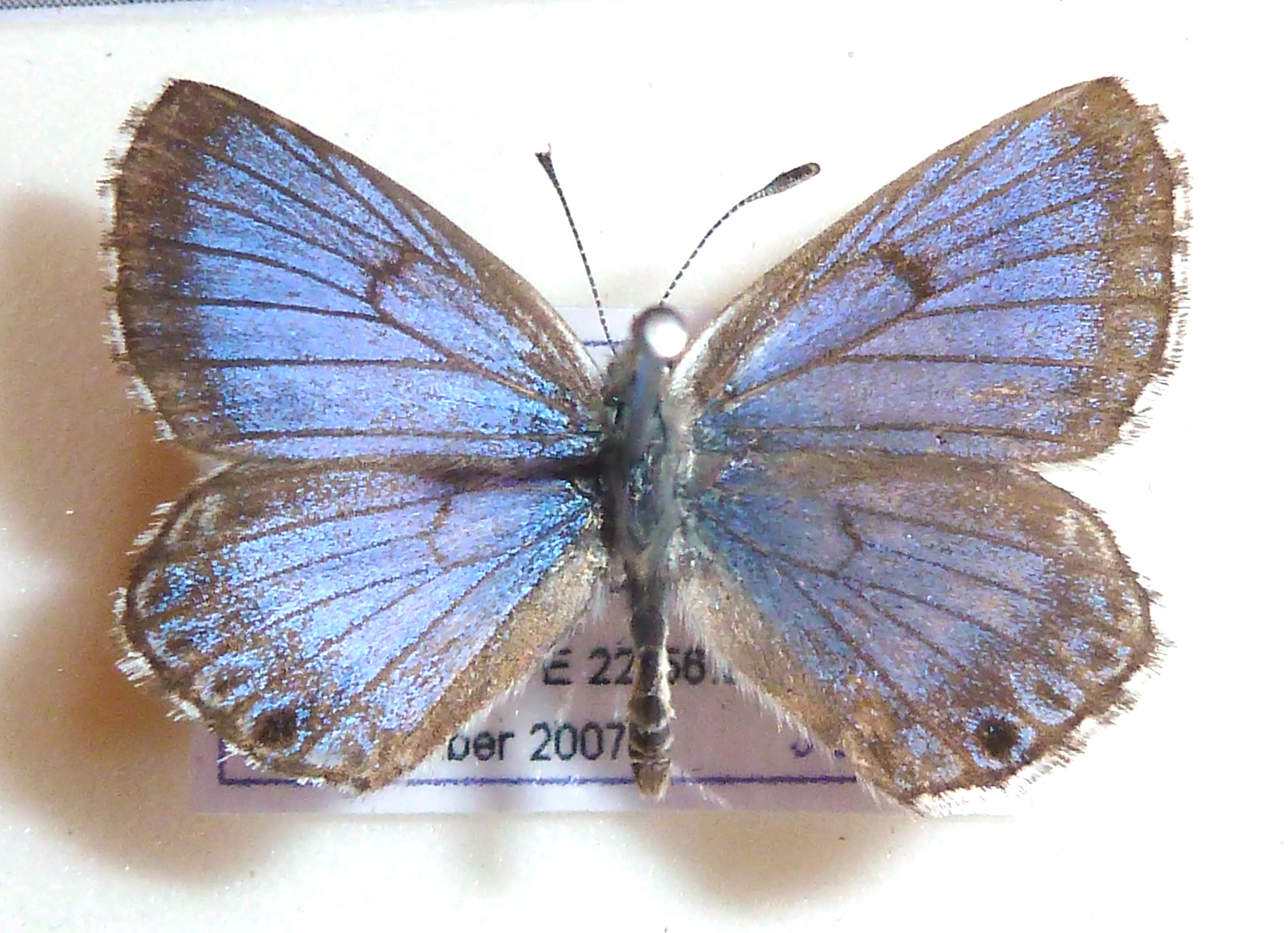

Conservation status
- Least Concern (IUCN 3.1)

Scientific classification
- Kingdom: Animalia
- Phylum: Arthropoda
- Class: Insecta
- Order: Lepidoptera
- Family: Lycaenidae
- Genus: Lepidochrysops
- Species: L. balli

Binomial name
- Lepidochrysops balli Dickson, 1985

= Lepidochrysops balli =

Species of butterfly

Lepidochrysops balli, Ball's blue, is a species of butterfly in the family Lycaenidae. It is endemic to South Africa.

The wingspan is 32–34 mm for males and 34–36 mm for females. Adults are on the wing from late November to February.

The larvae feed on Selago divaricata.
