= Lepidochrysops violetta =

Scientific classification
- Kingdom: Animalia
- Phylum: Arthropoda
- Class: Insecta
- Order: Lepidoptera
- Family: Lycaenidae
- Genus: Lepidochrysops
- Species: L. violetta

Binomial name
- Lepidochrysops violetta (Pinhey, 1945)

Synonyms
- Cupido (Lepidochrysops) violetta Pinhey, 1945; Neochrysops violetta

Species of butterfly

Lepidochrysops violetta, the violet blue, is a butterfly in the family Lycaenidae. It is found in Zimbabwe (the Nyanga massif). The habitat consists of the lower slopes of hills in grassland.

Adults have been recorded on wing in October and early November.
