= Lepidochrysops ansorgei =

Scientific classification
- Kingdom: Animalia
- Phylum: Arthropoda
- Class: Insecta
- Order: Lepidoptera
- Family: Lycaenidae
- Genus: Lepidochrysops
- Species: L. ansorgei

Binomial name
- Lepidochrysops ansorgei Tite, 1959

Species of butterfly

Lepidochrysops ansorgei is a butterfly in the family Lycaenidae. It is found in Angola and Zambia.

Adults are on wing from October to November.
