= Lepidochrysops chittyi =

Scientific classification
- Kingdom: Animalia
- Phylum: Arthropoda
- Class: Insecta
- Order: Lepidoptera
- Family: Lycaenidae
- Genus: Lepidochrysops
- Species: L. chittyi

Binomial name
- Lepidochrysops chittyi Henning & Henning, 1994

Species of butterfly

Lepidochrysops chittyi, the Chitty's blue, is a butterfly in the family Lycaenidae. It is found in Zimbabwe. The habitat consists of flat grassland.

Adults are on wing from September to October.
