= Lepidochrysops chalceus =

Scientific classification
- Kingdom: Animalia
- Phylum: Arthropoda
- Class: Insecta
- Order: Lepidoptera
- Family: Lycaenidae
- Genus: Lepidochrysops
- Species: L. chalceus

Binomial name
- Lepidochrysops chalceus Quickelberge, 1979

Species of butterfly

Lepidochrysops chalceus is a butterfly in the family Lycaenidae. It is found in Malawi (the western part of the Nyika Plateau) and Zambia. The habitat consists of montane grassland at altitudes between 2,194 and 2,286 meters.

Adults are on wing from October to December.
