= Lepidochrysops mcgregori =

Conservation status
- Least Concern (IUCN 3.1)

Scientific classification
- Kingdom: Animalia
- Phylum: Arthropoda
- Class: Insecta
- Order: Lepidoptera
- Family: Lycaenidae
- Genus: Lepidochrysops
- Species: L. mcgregori

Binomial name
- Lepidochrysops mcgregori Pennington, 1970

Synonyms
- Lepidochrysops macgregori

Species of butterfly

Lepidochrysops mcgregori, the McGregor's blue, is a butterfly of the family Lycaenidae. It is found in South Africa, where it is found in Succulent Karoo of the Northern Cape.

The wingspan is 28–32 mm for males and 30–33 mm for females. Adults are on wing from late August to early October. There is one generation per year.
