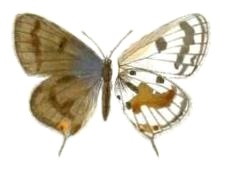

Scientific classification
- Kingdom: Animalia
- Phylum: Arthropoda
- Class: Insecta
- Order: Lepidoptera
- Family: Lycaenidae
- Genus: Lepidochrysops
- Species: L. reichenowii

Binomial name
- Lepidochrysops reichenowii (Dewitz, 1879)

Synonyms
- Plebeius reichenowii Dewitz, 1879; Neochrysops reichenowii

= Lepidochrysops reichenowii =

Species of butterfly

Lepidochrysops reichenowii is a butterfly in the family Lycaenidae. It is found in Angola.
