= Lepidochrysops jamesi =

Scientific classification
- Kingdom: Animalia
- Phylum: Arthropoda
- Class: Insecta
- Order: Lepidoptera
- Family: Lycaenidae
- Genus: Lepidochrysops
- Species: L. jamesi

Binomial name
- Lepidochrysops jamesi Swanepoel, 1971

Species of butterfly

Lepidochrysops jamesi, the James's blue, is a butterfly of the family Lycaenidae. It is found in South Africa.

The wingspan is 30–36 mm. Adults are on wing from September to early November. There is one generation per year.

== Subspecies ==
- Lepidochrysops jamesi jamesi (Koedoesberg and Swaarweerberg in North Cape)
- Lepidochrysops jamesi claassensi Dickson, 1982 (Hantamsberg in North Cape)
