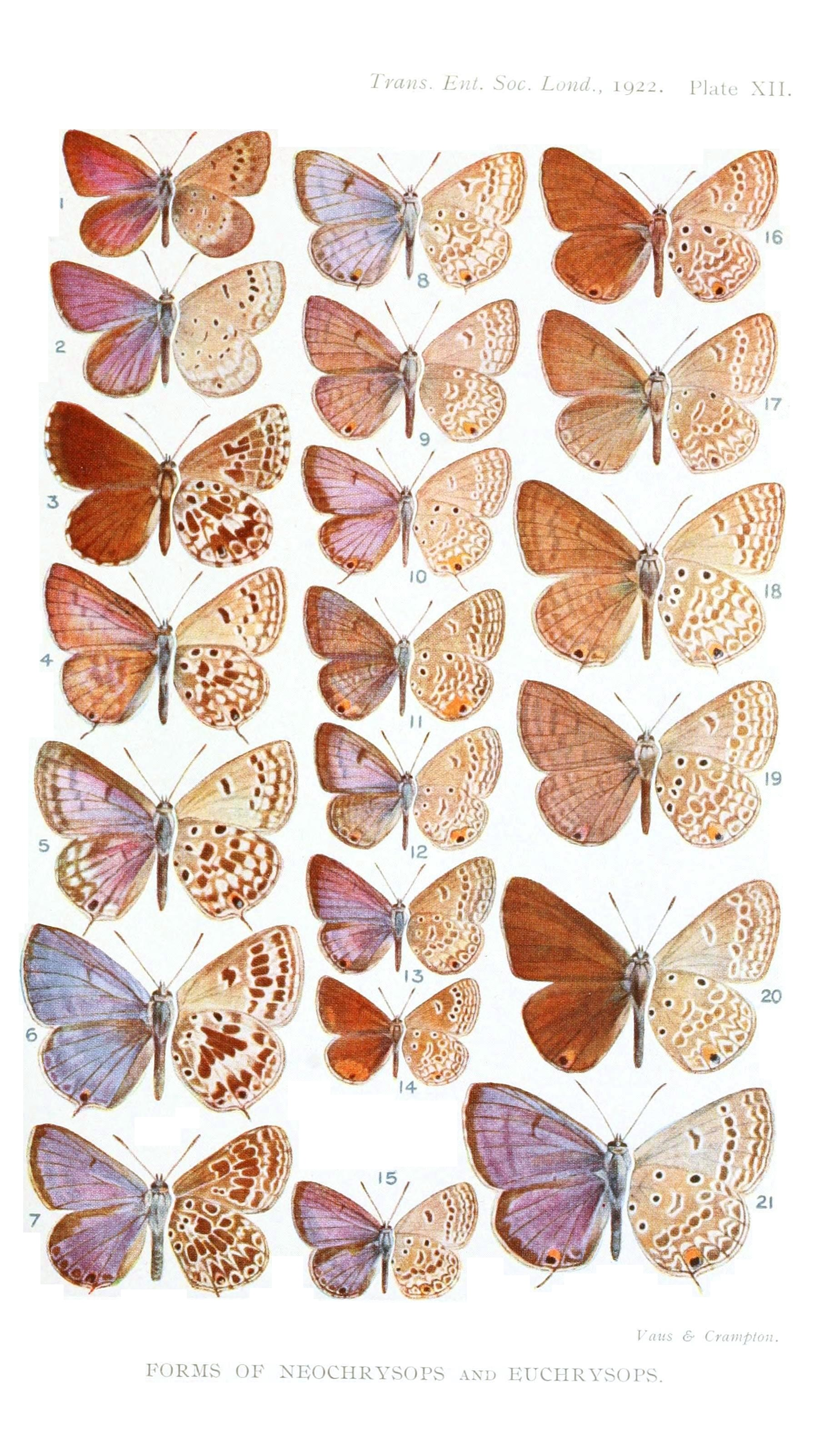
- Figure 17

Scientific classification
- Kingdom: Animalia
- Phylum: Arthropoda
- Class: Insecta
- Order: Lepidoptera
- Family: Lycaenidae
- Genus: Lepidochrysops
- Species: L. cinerea

Binomial name
- Lepidochrysops cinerea (Bethune-Baker, [1923])

Synonyms
- Neochrysops cinerea Bethune-Baker, [1923]; Neochrysops menna Hulstaert, 1924; Neochrysops theodota Hulstaert, 1924

= Lepidochrysops cinerea =

Species of butterfly

Lepidochrysops cinerea is a butterfly in the family Lycaenidae. It is found in the Democratic Republic of the Congo, Tanzania and Zambia. The habitat consists of Brachystegia woodland and montane grassland at altitudes between 1,000 and 2,000 meters.

Adults are on wing from August to September in montane grassland and from November to December in woodland.
