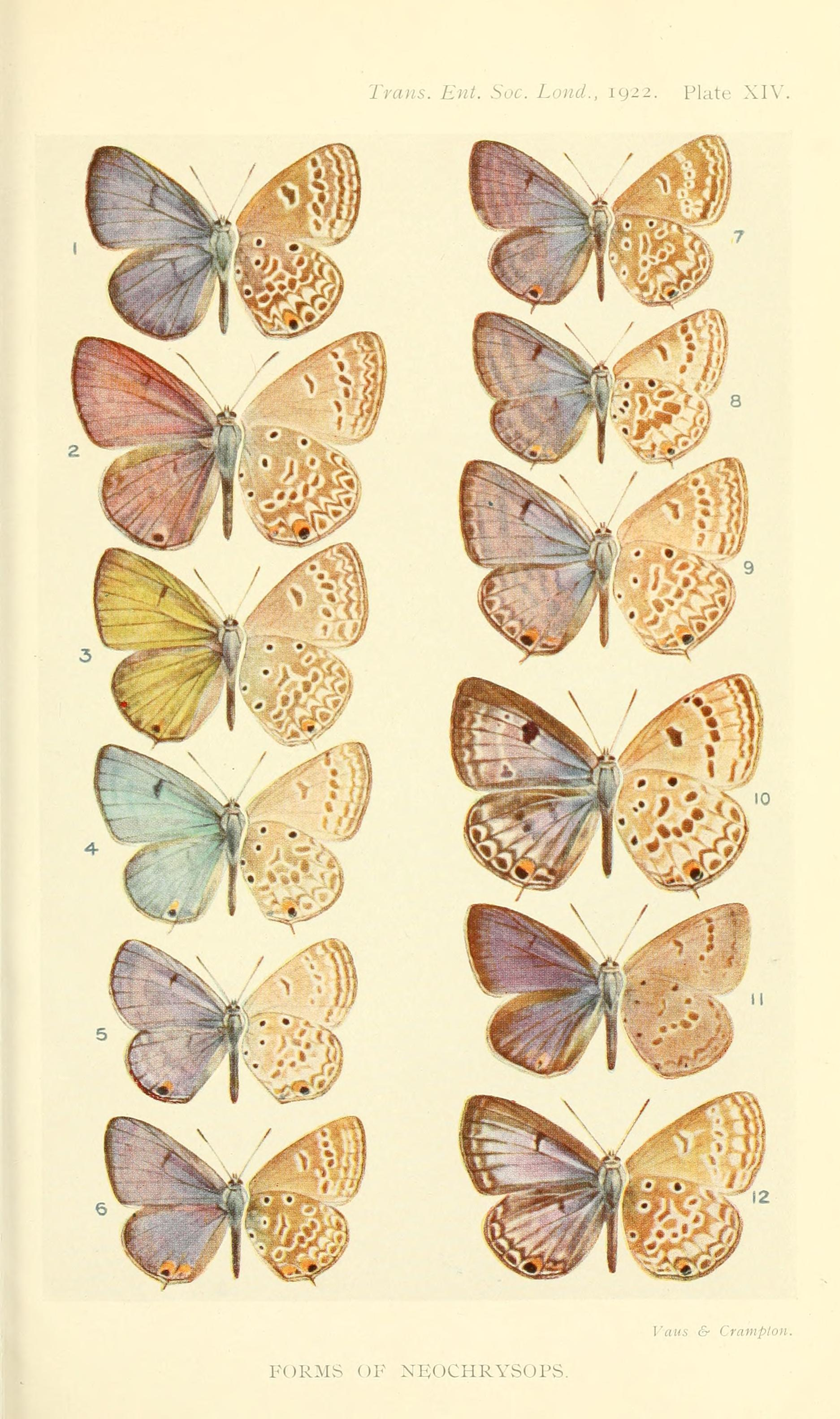
- figure 9, 10

Scientific classification
- Kingdom: Animalia
- Phylum: Arthropoda
- Class: Insecta
- Order: Lepidoptera
- Family: Lycaenidae
- Genus: Lepidochrysops
- Species: L. aethiopia

Binomial name
- Lepidochrysops aethiopia (Bethune-Baker, [1923])

Synonyms
- Neochrysops aethiopia Bethune-Baker, [1923]; Neochrysops nyasae Bethune-Baker, [1923]

= Lepidochrysops aethiopia =

Species of butterfly

Lepidochrysops aethiopia is a butterfly in the family Lycaenidae. It is found in Malawi, Zambia and northern Mozambique. The habitat consists of deciduous woodland, usually on small, rocky hillsides.

The wingspan is about 50 mm.
