= Lepidochrysops budama =

Scientific classification
- Kingdom: Animalia
- Phylum: Arthropoda
- Clade: Pancrustacea
- Class: Insecta
- Order: Lepidoptera
- Family: Lycaenidae
- Genus: Lepidochrysops
- Species: L. budama

Binomial name
- Lepidochrysops budama van Someren, 1957

Species of butterfly

Lepidochrysops budama is a butterfly in the family Lycaenidae. It is found in south-eastern and north-western Uganda. The habitat consists of areas with short grass and flowers of the family Lamiaceae on the rocky slopes of hills and ridges.

The length of the forewings is 16–19 mm. Adults feed from the flowers of the family Lamiaceae.
