= Lepidochrysops littoralis =

Conservation status
- Endangered (IUCN 3.1)

Scientific classification
- Kingdom: Animalia
- Phylum: Arthropoda
- Class: Insecta
- Order: Lepidoptera
- Family: Lycaenidae
- Genus: Lepidochrysops
- Species: L. littoralis

Binomial name
- Lepidochrysops littoralis Swanepoel & Vári, 1983

Species of butterfly

Lepidochrysops littoralis, the coastal blue, is a species of butterfly in the family Lycaenidae. It is endemic to South Africa.

The wingspan is 34–36 mm for males and 36–38 mm for females. Adults are on wing from late August to December.
