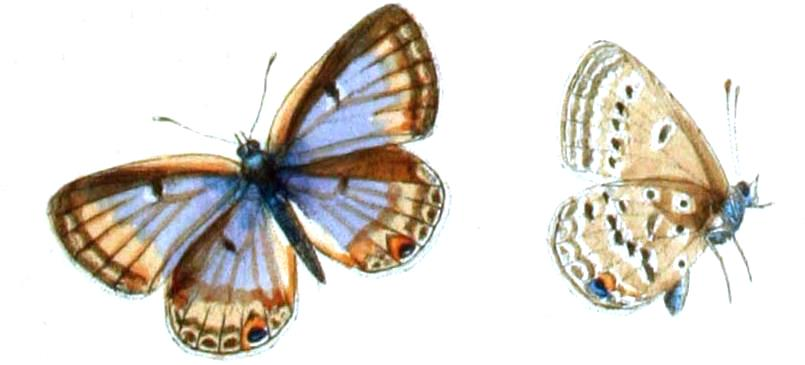

Scientific classification
- Kingdom: Animalia
- Phylum: Arthropoda
- Class: Insecta
- Order: Lepidoptera
- Family: Lycaenidae
- Genus: Lepidochrysops
- Species: L. negus

Binomial name
- Lepidochrysops negus (Felder & Felder, [1865])

Synonyms
- Lycaena negus Felder & Felder, [1865]; Cupido negus; Neochrysops negus; Cupido negus f. wau Wichgraf, 1921

= Lepidochrysops negus =

Species of butterfly

Lepidochrysops negus is a butterfly in the family Lycaenidae. It is found in Sudan and Ethiopia.

The wingspan is 40 mm for males and 42–45 mm for females.

== Subspecies ==
- Lepidochrysops negus negus (Ethiopia)
- Lepidochrysops negus wau (Wichgraf, 1921) (eastern Sudan)
