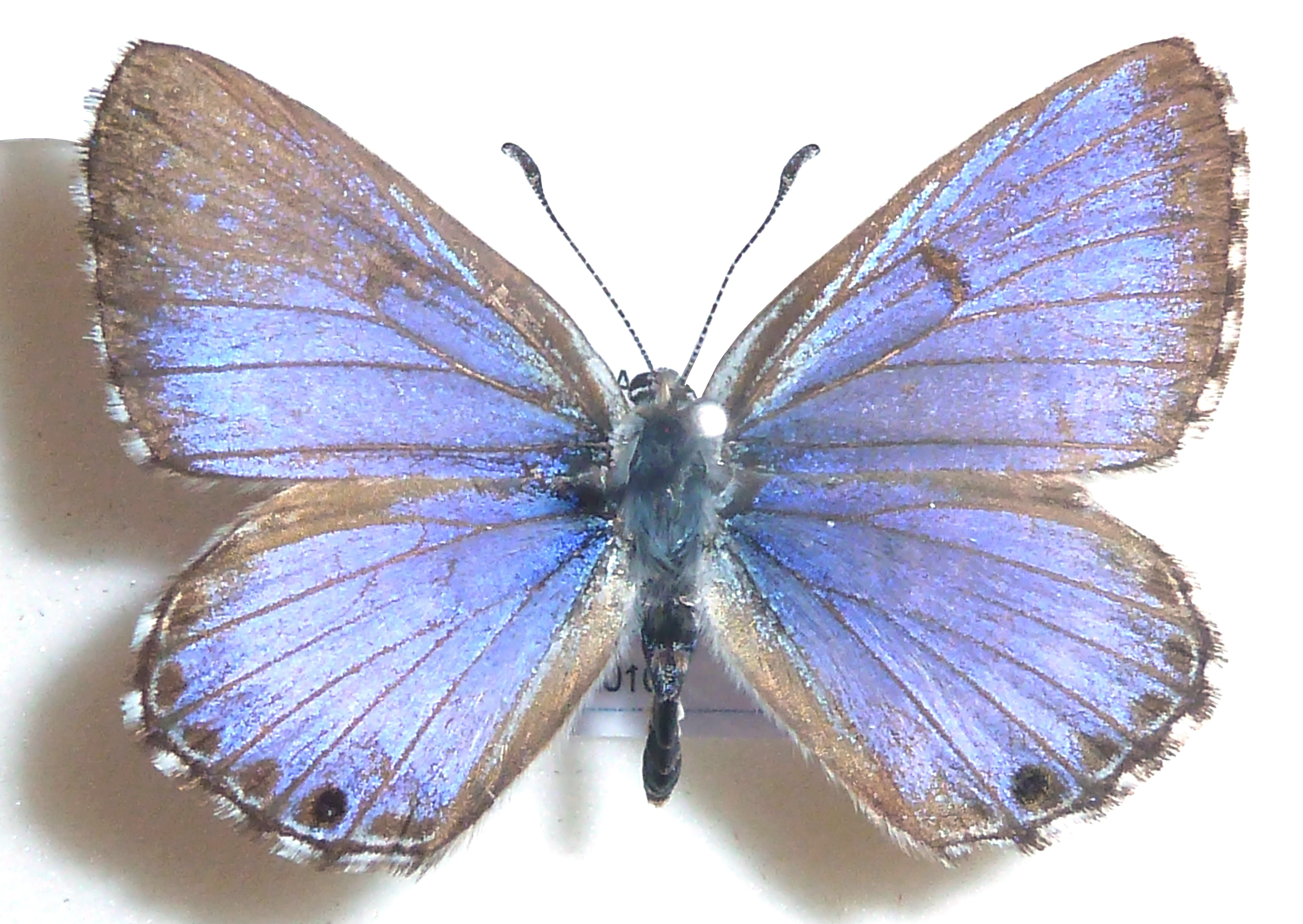

Scientific classification
- Kingdom: Animalia
- Phylum: Arthropoda
- Class: Insecta
- Order: Lepidoptera
- Family: Lycaenidae
- Genus: Lepidochrysops
- Species: L. ortygia

Binomial name
- Lepidochrysops ortygia (Trimen, 1887)

Synonyms
- Lycaena ortygia Trimen, 1887

= Lepidochrysops ortygia =

Koppie blue

Species of butterfly

Lepidochrysops ortygia, the koppie blue, is a butterfly of the family Lycaenidae. It is found in South Africa, from the hills in the Eastern Cape, north through the lower parts of Lesotho to the Free State and southern Mpumalanga and Gauteng.

The wingspan is 35–40 mm (1.4–1.6 in) for males and 33–42 mm (1.3–1.7 in) for females. Adults are on wing from October to April, with peaks in December or March depending on rains. There are possibly multiple generations per year.

The larvae feed on Selago geniculata.
