= Lepidochrysops leucon =

Scientific classification
- Kingdom: Animalia
- Phylum: Arthropoda
- Class: Insecta
- Order: Lepidoptera
- Family: Lycaenidae
- Genus: Lepidochrysops
- Species: L. leucon

Binomial name
- Lepidochrysops leucon (Mabille, 1879)

Synonyms
- Lycaena leucon Mabille, 1879; Cupido leucon; Neochrysops leucon

Species of butterfly

Lepidochrysops leucon is a butterfly in the family Lycaenidae. It is found on Madagascar.
