= Lepidochrysops flavisquamosa =

Scientific classification
- Kingdom: Animalia
- Phylum: Arthropoda
- Class: Insecta
- Order: Lepidoptera
- Family: Lycaenidae
- Genus: Lepidochrysops
- Species: L. flavisquamosa

Binomial name
- Lepidochrysops flavisquamosa Tite, 1959

Species of butterfly

Lepidochrysops flavisquamosa is a butterfly in the family Lycaenidae. It is found in Angola.

Adults have been recorded in October.
