= Lepidochrysops kitale =

Conservation status
- Least Concern (IUCN 3.1)

Scientific classification
- Kingdom: Animalia
- Phylum: Arthropoda
- Clade: Pancrustacea
- Class: Insecta
- Order: Lepidoptera
- Family: Lycaenidae
- Genus: Lepidochrysops
- Species: L. kitale

Binomial name
- Lepidochrysops kitale (Stempffer, 1936)

Synonyms
- Neochrysops cinerea kitale Stempffer, 1936; Cupido cinerea f. imperialis Stoneham, 1938; Cupido cinerea f. princeps Stoneham, 1938

Species of butterfly

Lepidochrysops kitale, the Kitale giant Cupid, is a butterfly in the family Lycaenidae. It is found in north-western Kenya. The habitat consists of savanna.
