= Lepidochrysops guichardi =

Scientific classification
- Kingdom: Animalia
- Phylum: Arthropoda
- Clade: Pancrustacea
- Class: Insecta
- Order: Lepidoptera
- Family: Lycaenidae
- Genus: Lepidochrysops
- Species: L. guichardi

Binomial name
- Lepidochrysops guichardi Gabriel, 1949

Species of butterfly

Lepidochrysops guichardi is a butterfly in the family Lycaenidae. It is found in Ethiopia.
