= Lepidochrysops swanepoeli =

Conservation status
- Critically Endangered (IUCN 3.1)

Scientific classification
- Kingdom: Animalia
- Phylum: Arthropoda
- Class: Insecta
- Order: Lepidoptera
- Family: Lycaenidae
- Genus: Lepidochrysops
- Species: L. swanepoeli

Binomial name
- Lepidochrysops swanepoeli (Pennington, 1948)

Synonyms
- Cupido (Lepidochrysops) swanepoeli Pennington, 1948

Species of butterfly

Lepidochrysops swanepoeli, the Swanepoel's blue, is a species of butterfly in the family Lycaenidae. It is endemic to South Africa, where it is found in montane grassland in the hills above Fairview and the Sheba Mines in Mpumalanga. There is also a single record from northern KwaZulu-Natal.

The wingspan is 36–40 mm for males and 38–42 mm for females. Adults are on wing from September to early December, with a peak in November. There is one extended generation per year.

The larvae feed on Becium grandiflorum.
