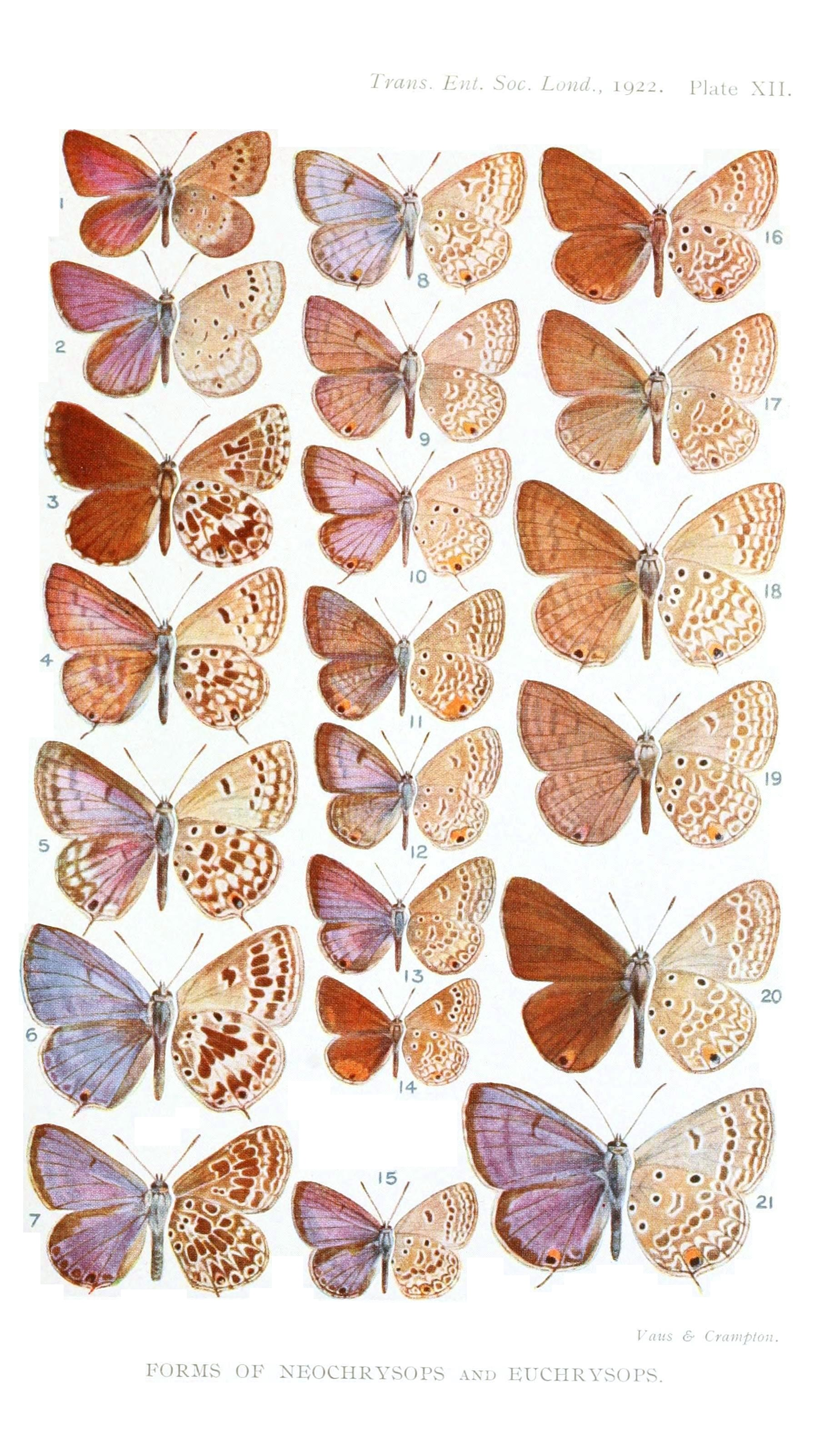
- Figure 7

Conservation status
- Least Concern (IUCN 3.1)

Scientific classification
- Kingdom: Animalia
- Phylum: Arthropoda
- Class: Insecta
- Order: Lepidoptera
- Family: Lycaenidae
- Genus: Lepidochrysops
- Species: L. trimeni

Binomial name
- Lepidochrysops trimeni (Bethune-Baker, 1923)

Synonyms
- Neochrysops trimeni Bethune-Baker, 1923

= Lepidochrysops trimeni =

Species of butterfly

Lepidochrysops trimeni, the Trimen's blue, is a butterfly of the family Lycaenidae. It is found in South Africa, where it is known from the Western Cape.

The wingspan is 37–40 mm for males and 35–42 mm for females. Adults are on wing from September to January or February, with a peak depending on rainfall but usually from October to November. There is one extended generation per year.

The larvae feed on Selago species (including Selago serrata) and Aspalathus sarcantha. Third and later instar larvae feed on the brood of Camponotus maculatus ants.

== Etymology ==
The name honours Roland Trimen.
