= Lepidochrysops vera =

Scientific classification
- Kingdom: Animalia
- Phylum: Arthropoda
- Class: Insecta
- Order: Lepidoptera
- Family: Lycaenidae
- Genus: Lepidochrysops
- Species: L. vera

Binomial name
- Lepidochrysops vera Tite, 1961

Species of butterfly

Lepidochrysops vera, the Vera's giant Cupid, is a butterfly in the family Lycaenidae. It is found in Nigeria.

Adults have been recorded on wing in May and June.
