= Lepidochrysops gydoae =

Conservation status
- Least Concern (IUCN 3.1)

Scientific classification
- Kingdom: Animalia
- Phylum: Arthropoda
- Class: Insecta
- Order: Lepidoptera
- Family: Lycaenidae
- Genus: Lepidochrysops
- Species: L. gydoae

Binomial name
- Lepidochrysops gydoae Dickson & Wykeham, 1994

Species of butterfly

Lepidochrysops gydoae, the Gydo blue, is a butterfly of the family Lycaenidae. It is found in South Africa, where it is restricted to fynbos on the northern slopes of the Gydo Mountain and the Theronsberg in the Western Cape.

The wingspan is 41–45 mm (1.6–1.8 in) for males and 43–46 mm (1.7–1.8 in) for females. Adults are on wing from November to January. There is one generation per year.

The larvae probably feed on Selago species.
