= Lepidochrysops nyika =

Scientific classification
- Kingdom: Animalia
- Phylum: Arthropoda
- Class: Insecta
- Order: Lepidoptera
- Family: Lycaenidae
- Genus: Lepidochrysops
- Species: L. nyika

Binomial name
- Lepidochrysops nyika Tite, 1961

Species of butterfly

Lepidochrysops nyika is a butterfly in the family Lycaenidae. It is found in Malawi and Zambia.

Adults have been recorded on wing in September and October.
