= Lepidochrysops heathi =

Scientific classification
- Kingdom: Animalia
- Phylum: Arthropoda
- Class: Insecta
- Order: Lepidoptera
- Family: Lycaenidae
- Genus: Lepidochrysops
- Species: L. heathi

Binomial name
- Lepidochrysops heathi Gardiner, 1998

Species of butterfly

Lepidochrysops heathi is a butterfly in the family Lycaenidae. It is found in Zambia. Adults feed from flowers, including Ocimum species. They have been recorded in October.
