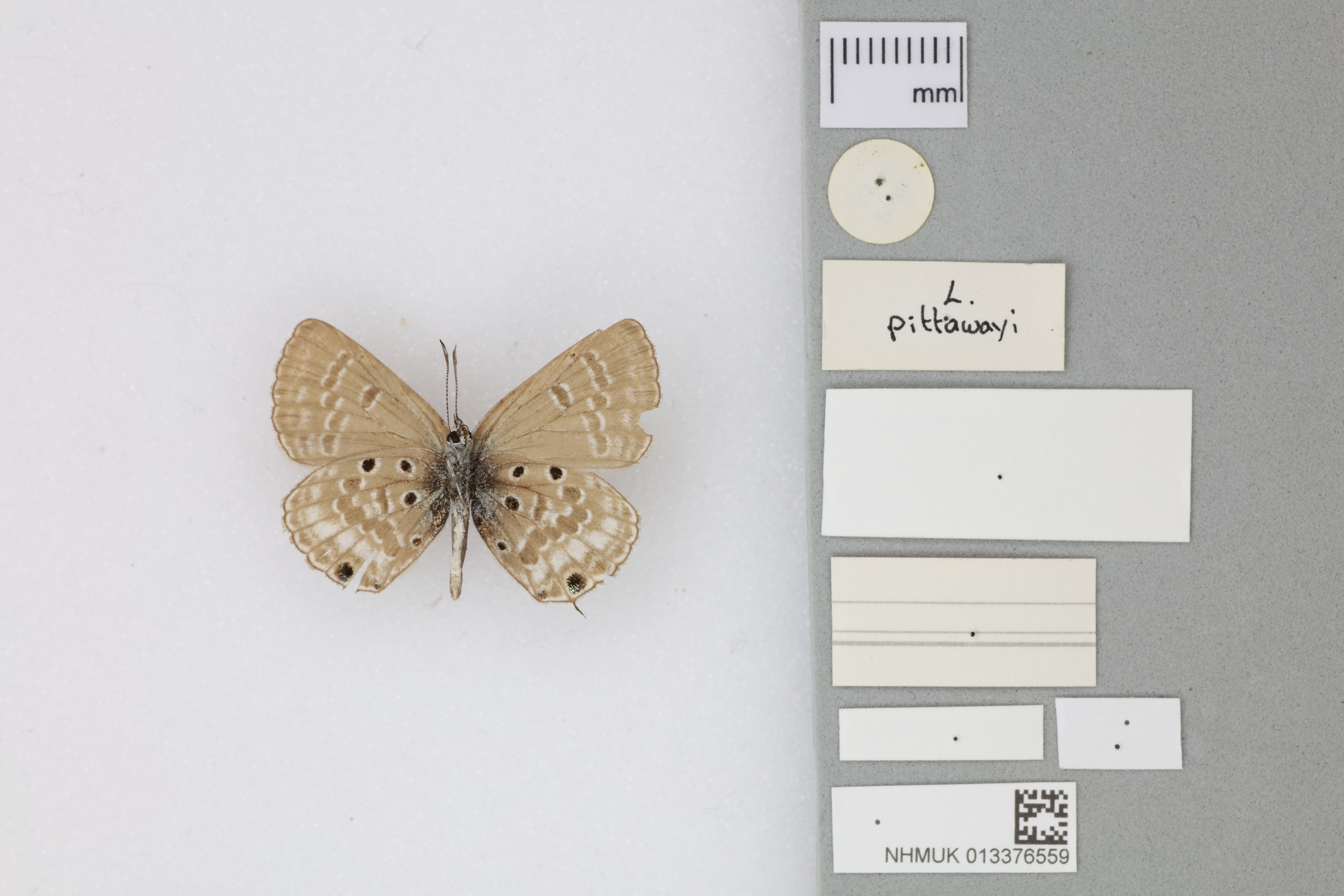
- A ventral photograph of Lepidochrysops pittawayli

Scientific classification
- Kingdom: Animalia
- Phylum: Arthropoda
- Class: Insecta
- Order: Lepidoptera
- Family: Lycaenidae
- Genus: Lepidochrysops
- Species: L. pittawayi

Binomial name
- Lepidochrysops pittawayi Larsen, 1983

= Lepidochrysops pittawayi =

Species of butterfly

Lepidochrysops pittawayi, the Pittaway's giant Cupid, is a butterfly in the family Lycaenidae. It is found in western Saudi Arabia. The habitat consists of high altitudes in the Asir Mountains. Colonies occur on steep slopes with patches of herbaceous Lamiaceae.

Adults have been recorded on wing in April.

The larvae feed on Micromeria species
