= Lepidochrysops inyangae =

Scientific classification
- Kingdom: Animalia
- Phylum: Arthropoda
- Class: Insecta
- Order: Lepidoptera
- Family: Lycaenidae
- Genus: Lepidochrysops
- Species: L. inyangae

Binomial name
- Lepidochrysops inyangae (Pinhey, 1945)

Synonyms
- Cupido (Lepidochrysops) inyangae Pinhey, 1945

Species of butterfly

Lepidochrysops inyangae, the Nyanga blue, is a butterfly in the family Lycaenidae. It is found in western Tanzania and Zimbabwe (the Nyanga massif). The habitat consists of grassland and Brachystegia woodland.

Both sexes are attracted to flowers. Adults have been recorded on wing in October and November.
