= Lepidochrysops dollmani =

Scientific classification
- Kingdom: Animalia
- Phylum: Arthropoda
- Class: Insecta
- Order: Lepidoptera
- Family: Lycaenidae
- Genus: Lepidochrysops
- Species: L. dollmani

Binomial name
- Lepidochrysops dollmani (George Thomas Bethune-Baker, [1923])

Synonyms
- Neochrysops dollmani Bethune-Baker, [1923]

Species of butterfly

Lepidochrysops dollmani is a butterfly in the family Lycaenidae. It is found in south-western and western Tanzania, northern Zambia and possibly Malawi. The habitat consists of Brachystegia woodland.

Both sexes feed from the flowers of herbaceous plants. Adults have been recorded in November and December.
