= Lepidochrysops caerulea =

Scientific classification
- Kingdom: Animalia
- Phylum: Arthropoda
- Class: Insecta
- Order: Lepidoptera
- Family: Lycaenidae
- Genus: Lepidochrysops
- Species: L. caerulea

Binomial name
- Lepidochrysops caerulea Tite, 1961

Species of butterfly

Lepidochrysops caerulea is a butterfly in the family Lycaenidae. It is found on Madagascar.
