= Lepidochrysops michaeli =

Scientific classification
- Kingdom: Animalia
- Phylum: Arthropoda
- Class: Insecta
- Order: Lepidoptera
- Family: Lycaenidae
- Genus: Lepidochrysops
- Species: L. michaeli

Binomial name
- Lepidochrysops michaeli Gardiner, 2003

Species of butterfly

Lepidochrysops michaeli is a butterfly in the family Lycaenidae. It is found in north-western Zambia.

Adults feed from the flowers of the larval host plant. They have been recorded on wing in October.

The larvae feed on Ocimum species.

== Etymology ==
The species is named for Michael W. Gardiner.
