= Lepidochrysops kilimanjarensis =

Scientific classification
- Kingdom: Animalia
- Phylum: Arthropoda
- Class: Insecta
- Order: Lepidoptera
- Family: Lycaenidae
- Genus: Lepidochrysops
- Species: L. kilimanjarensis

Binomial name
- Lepidochrysops kilimanjarensis (Strand, 1909)

Synonyms
- Cupido kilimanjarensis Strand, 1909; Neochrysops kilimanjarensis

Species of butterfly

Lepidochrysops kilimanjarensis is a butterfly in the family Lycaenidae. It is found on Mount Kilimanjaro in Tanzania.
