= Lepidochrysops jansei =

Scientific classification
- Kingdom: Animalia
- Phylum: Arthropoda
- Class: Insecta
- Order: Lepidoptera
- Family: Lycaenidae
- Genus: Lepidochrysops
- Species: L. jansei

Binomial name
- Lepidochrysops jansei van Someren, 1957

Species of butterfly

Lepidochrysops jansei, the Janse's blue, is a butterfly in the family Lycaenidae. It is found in south-central Kenya and northern Tanzania. The habitat consists of areas with short grass and flowers of the family Lamiaceae, often on shallow soils on a rock substratum.

Adults are on wing in November and April.

The larvae feed on Lamiaceae species.
