= Lepidochrysops hawkeri =

Scientific classification
- Kingdom: Animalia
- Phylum: Arthropoda
- Class: Insecta
- Order: Lepidoptera
- Family: Lycaenidae
- Genus: Lepidochrysops
- Species: L. hawkeri

Binomial name
- Lepidochrysops hawkeri (Talbot, 1929)

Synonyms
- Euchrysops hawkeri Talbot, 1929

Species of butterfly

Lepidochrysops hawkeri is a butterfly in the family Lycaenidae. It is found in south-eastern Angola.

Adults have been recorded in October.
