= Lepidochrysops albilinea =

Scientific classification
- Kingdom: Animalia
- Phylum: Arthropoda
- Class: Insecta
- Order: Lepidoptera
- Family: Lycaenidae
- Genus: Lepidochrysops
- Species: L. albilinea

Binomial name
- Lepidochrysops albilinea Tite, 1959

Species of butterfly

Lepidochrysops albilinea is a butterfly in the family Lycaenidae. It is found in South Sudan.
