= Lepidochrysops swartbergensis =

Conservation status
- Least Concern (IUCN 3.1)

Scientific classification
- Kingdom: Animalia
- Phylum: Arthropoda
- Class: Insecta
- Order: Lepidoptera
- Family: Lycaenidae
- Genus: Lepidochrysops
- Species: L. swartbergensis

Binomial name
- Lepidochrysops swartbergensis Swanepoel, 1969

Species of butterfly

Lepidochrysops swartbergensis, the Swartberg blue, is a butterfly of the family Lycaenidae. It is found in South Africa, where it found in fynbos on the Swartberg range from the Eastern Cape to Seweweekspoort and Klein Swartberg in the Western Cape. It is also found on the Rooiberg.

The wingspan is 32–36 mm for males and 34–38 mm for females. Adults are on wing from November to February. There is one extended generation per year.
