= Lepidochrysops mashuna =

Scientific classification
- Kingdom: Animalia
- Phylum: Arthropoda
- Class: Insecta
- Order: Lepidoptera
- Family: Lycaenidae
- Genus: Lepidochrysops
- Species: L. mashuna

Binomial name
- Lepidochrysops mashuna (Trimen, 1894)

Synonyms
- Lycaena mashuna Trimen, 1894; Cupido mashuna; Neochrysops mashuna

Species of butterfly

Lepidochrysops mashuna, the mashuna blue, is a butterfly in the family Lycaenidae. It is found in Zimbabwe. Their habitat consists of grassy areas in savanna. Adults feed from flowers. They are on wing from October to December.
