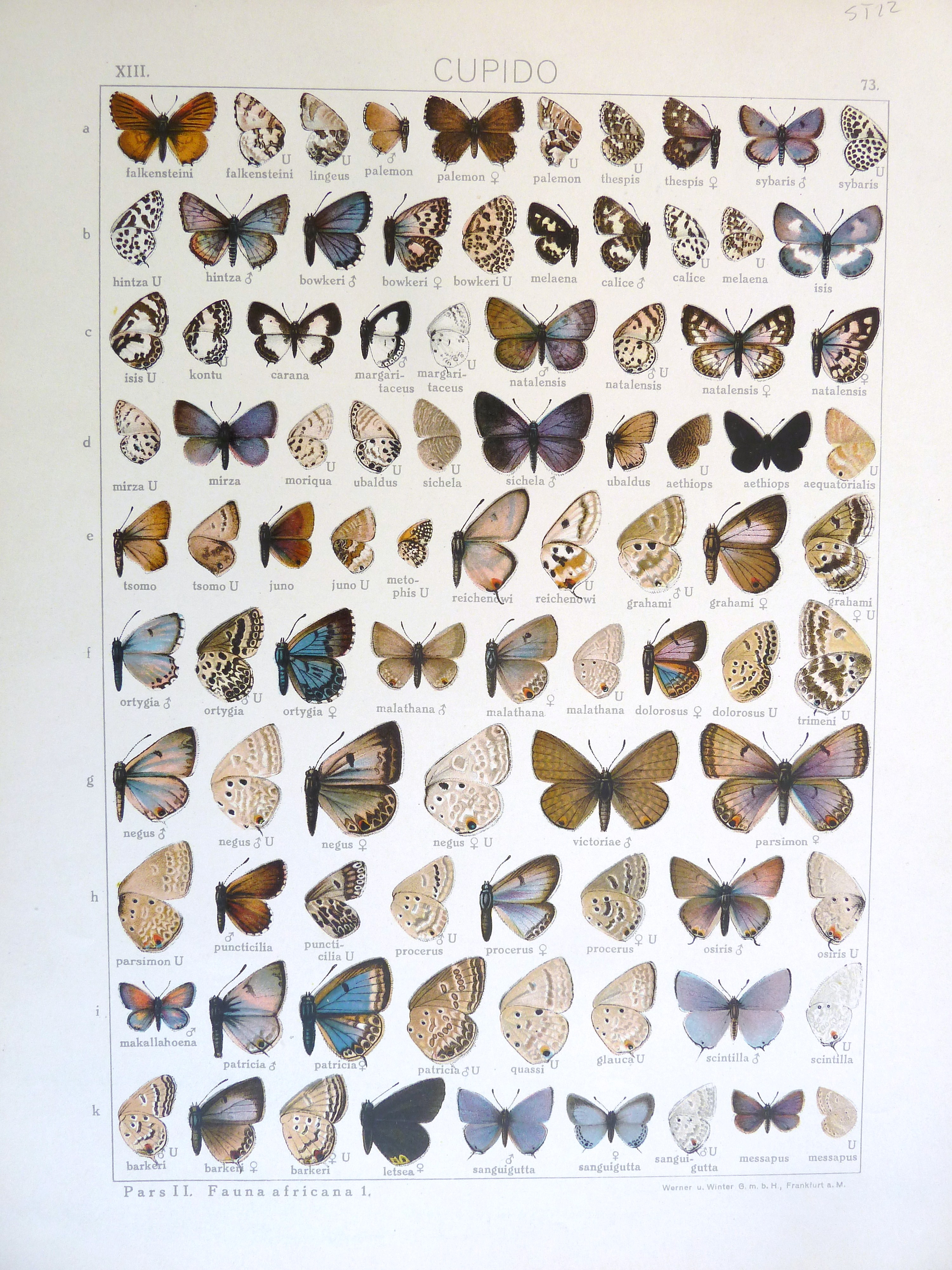
- e

Conservation status
- Least Concern (IUCN 3.1)

Scientific classification
- Kingdom: Animalia
- Phylum: Arthropoda
- Class: Insecta
- Order: Lepidoptera
- Family: Lycaenidae
- Genus: Lepidochrysops
- Species: L. grahami

Binomial name
- Lepidochrysops grahami (Trimen, 1893)

Synonyms
- Lycaena grahami Trimen, 1893; Cupido grahami; Neochrysops grahami

= Lepidochrysops grahami =

Species of butterfly

Lepidochrysops grahami, Graham's blue, is a butterfly of the family Lycaenidae. It is found in South Africa, where it is known from the north-eastern Eastern Cape.

The wingspan is 32–36 mm for males and 34–38 mm for females. Adults are on wing from early November to January. There is one extended generation per year.

The larvae feed on Ocimum species.
