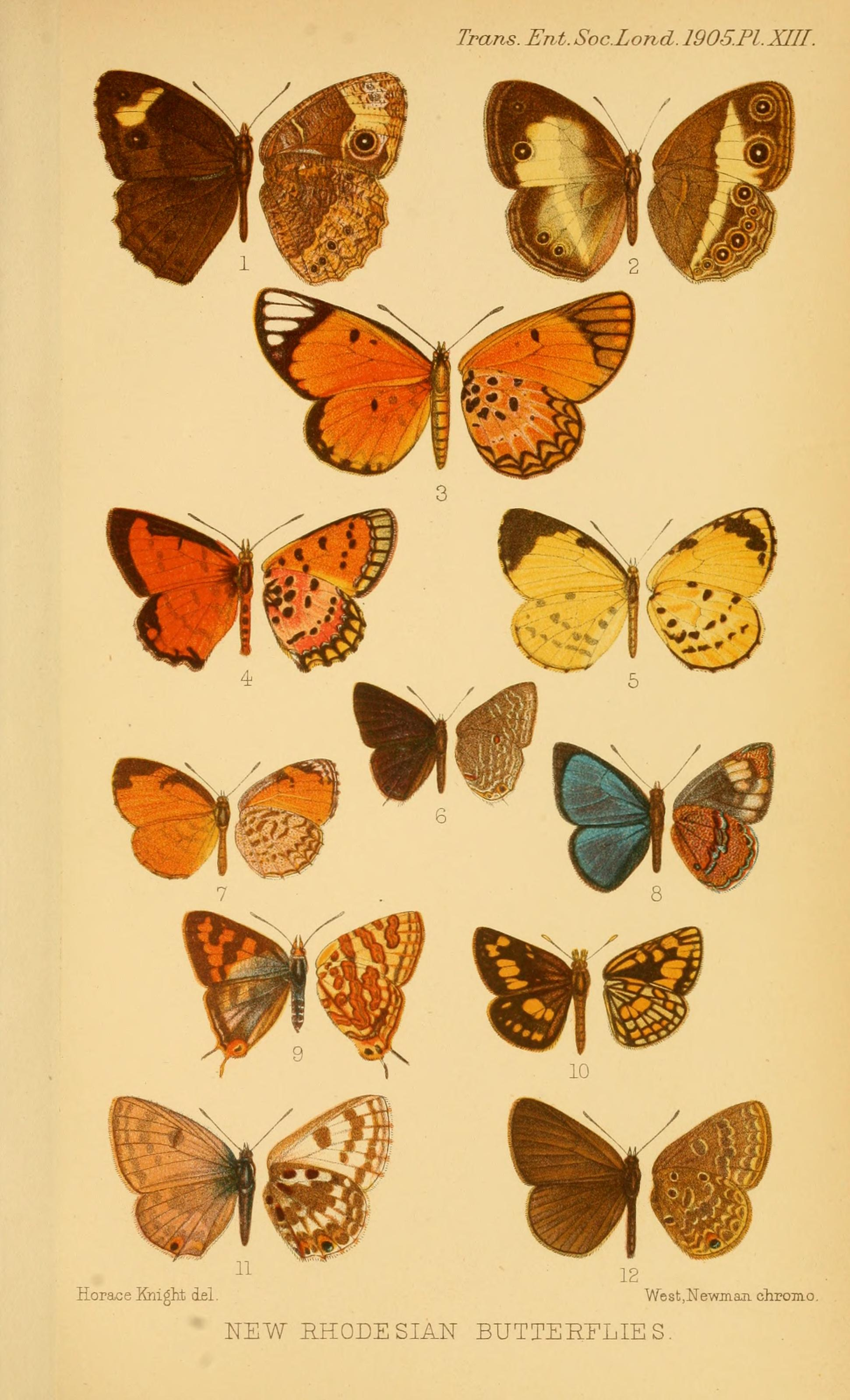
- Figure 12 which accompanied the original description

Scientific classification
- Kingdom: Animalia
- Phylum: Arthropoda
- Class: Insecta
- Order: Lepidoptera
- Family: Lycaenidae
- Genus: Lepidochrysops
- Species: L. skotios

Binomial name
- Lepidochrysops skotios (H. H. Druce, 1905)

Synonyms
- Catochrysops skotios H. H. Druce, 1905; Neochrysops skotios; Neochrysops orontius Hulstaert, 1924; Neochrysops brabo Hulstaert, 1924

= Lepidochrysops skotios =

Species of insect

Lepidochrysops skotios is a butterfly in the family Lycaenidae first described by Hamilton Herbert Druce in 1905. It is found in the Democratic Republic of the Congo (Katanga Province, Lualaba and possibly Kwango) and Zambia.

Adults have been recorded on wing in October and November.
