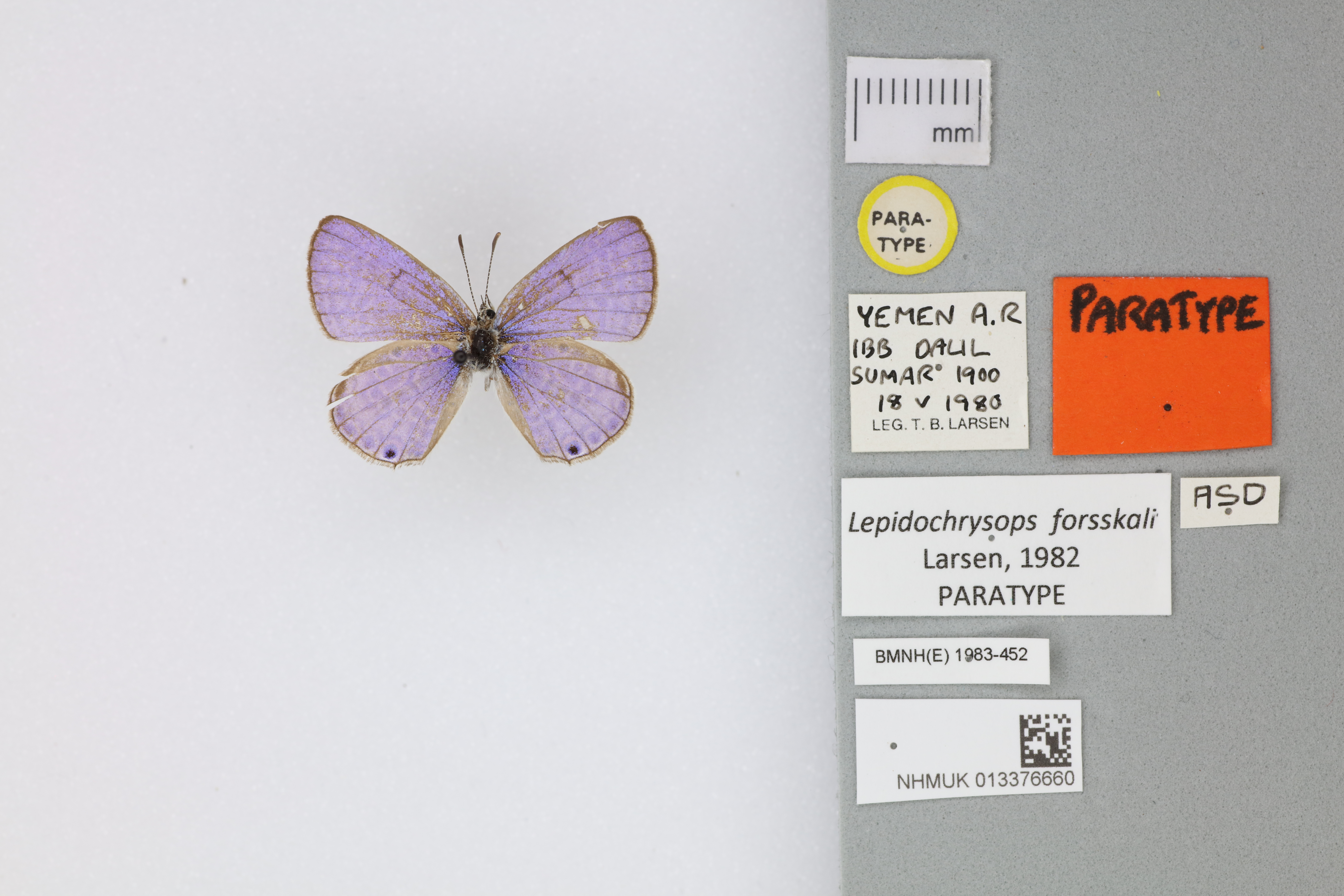

Scientific classification
- Kingdom: Animalia
- Phylum: Arthropoda
- Class: Insecta
- Order: Lepidoptera
- Family: Lycaenidae
- Genus: Lepidochrysops
- Species: L. forsskali

Binomial name
- Lepidochrysops forsskali Larsen, 1982

= Lepidochrysops forsskali =

Species of butterfly

Lepidochrysops forsskali, the Forsskaal's giant Cupid, is a butterfly in the family Lycaenidae. It is found in south-western Saudi Arabia and Yemen. Its habitat consists of steep slopes covered by tropical scrub at altitudes between 900 and 1,800 meters.

Adults have been recorded in October and February.

The larvae feed on Becium serpyllifolium.

Is named in honour of naturalist Peter Forsskål.
