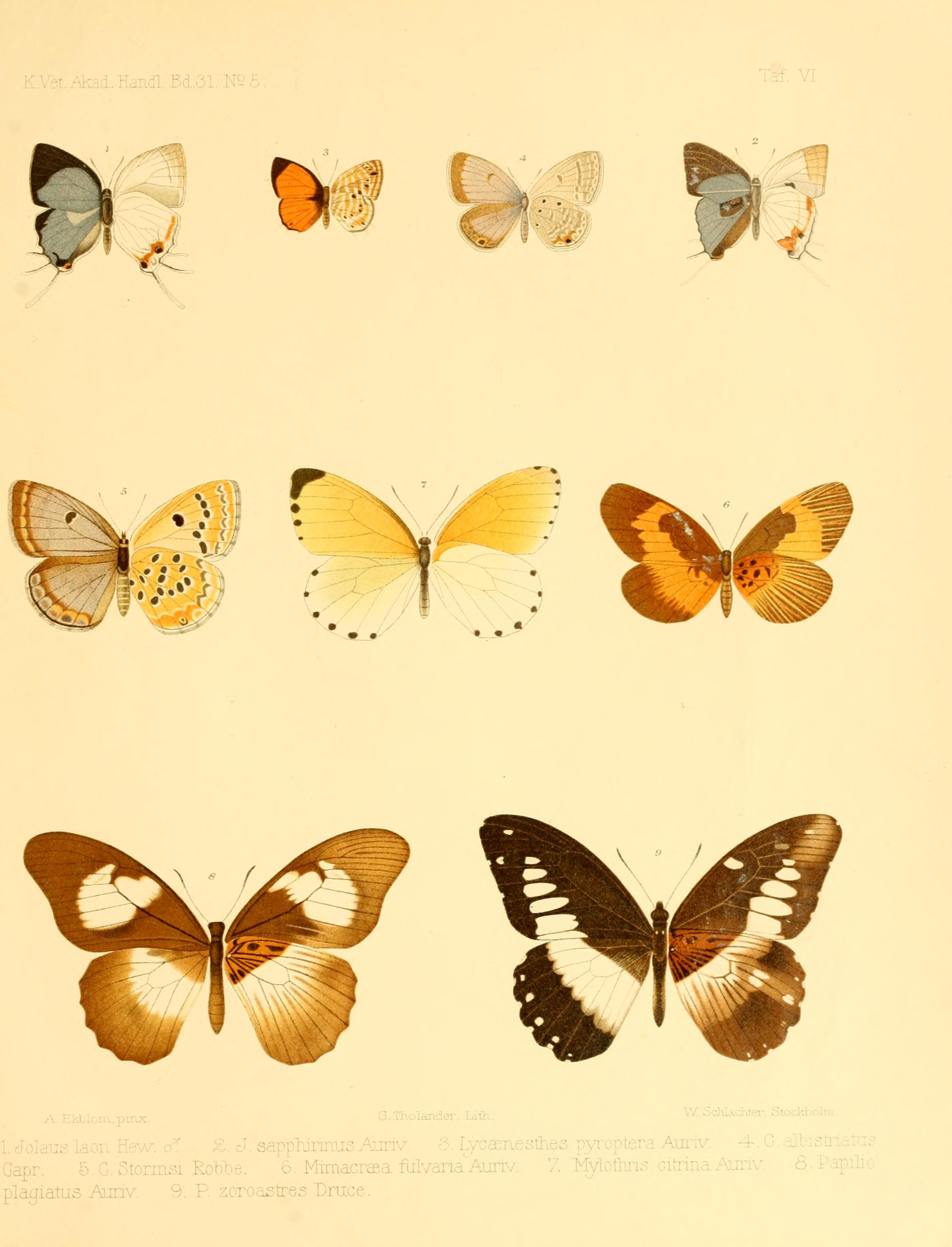
- in Rhopalocera Aethiopica Aurivillius, 1899 (figure 5)

Scientific classification
- Kingdom: Animalia
- Phylum: Arthropoda
- Class: Insecta
- Order: Lepidoptera
- Family: Lycaenidae
- Genus: Lepidochrysops
- Species: L. stormsi

Binomial name
- Lepidochrysops stormsi (Robbe, 1892)

Synonyms
- Lycaena stormsi Robbe, 1892; Cupido stormsi; Catachrysops stormsi; Neochrysops stormsi

= Lepidochrysops stormsi =

Species of butterfly

Lepidochrysops stormsi is a butterfly in the family Lycaenidae. It is found in the Democratic Republic of the Congo (Kasai, Lomami, Lualaba and Shaba) and Zimbabwe.

Adults have been recorded on wing in December.
