= Lepidochrysops anerius =

Scientific classification
- Kingdom: Animalia
- Phylum: Arthropoda
- Class: Insecta
- Order: Lepidoptera
- Family: Lycaenidae
- Genus: Lepidochrysops
- Species: L. anerius

Binomial name
- Lepidochrysops anerius (Hulstaert, 1924)

Synonyms
- Neochrysops anerius Hulstaert, 1924

Species of butterfly

Lepidochrysops anerius is a butterfly in the family Lycaenidae. It is found in the Democratic Republic of the Congo, Tanzania and Zambia. Its habitat consists of woodland.

Both sexes feed from the flowers of herbaceous plants. Adults are on wing from November to December, while adults of subspecies kiellandi have been recorded on wing in November and April.

== Subspecies ==
- Lepidochrysops anerius anerius (Democratic Republic of the Congo: Shaba, north-eastern Zambia)
- Lepidochrysops anerius kiellandi Stempffer, 1972 (Tanzania: eastern shores of Lake Tanganyika)
