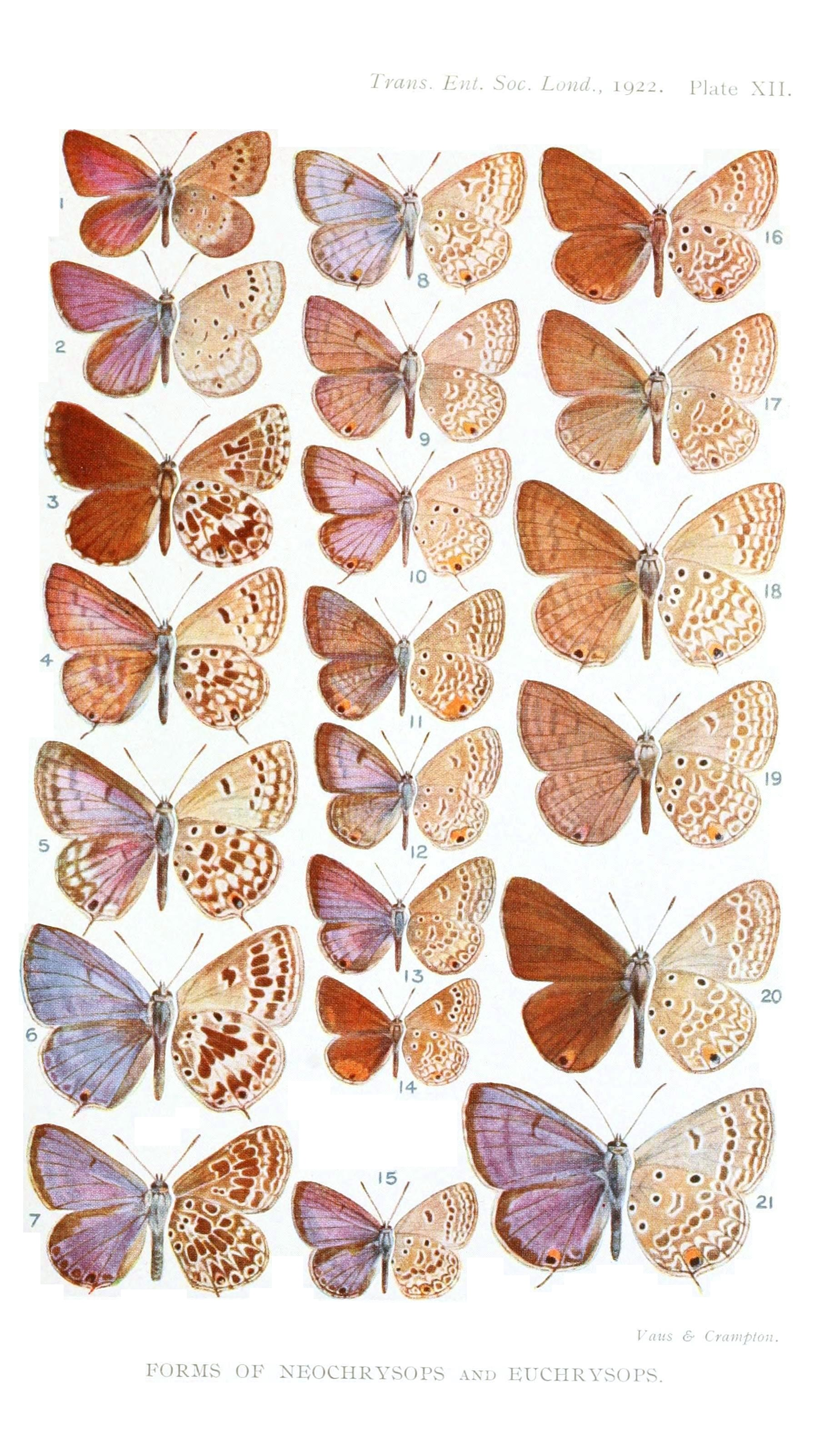
- Figure 16

Conservation status
- Least Concern (IUCN 3.1)

Scientific classification
- Kingdom: Animalia
- Phylum: Arthropoda
- Class: Insecta
- Order: Lepidoptera
- Family: Lycaenidae
- Genus: Lepidochrysops
- Species: L. letsea

Binomial name
- Lepidochrysops letsea (Trimen, 1870)

Synonyms
- Lycaena letsea Trimen, 1870; Cupido letsea; Neochrysops letsea

= Lepidochrysops letsea =

Species of butterfly

Lepidochrysops letsea, the Free State blue, is a butterfly of the family Lycaenidae. It is found in South Africa, in the Eastern Cape, which is the eastern part of the Free State and Gauteng.

The wingspan is 33–35 mm for males and 32–33 mm for females. Adults are on wing from October to January. There is one extended generation per year.

The larvae feed on Hemizygia pretoriae.
