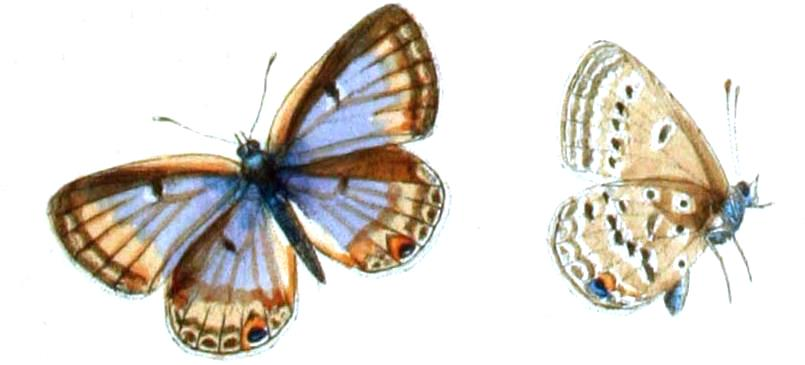
- L. negus (C. & R. Felder, [1865])

Scientific classification
- Domain: Eukaryota
- Kingdom: Animalia
- Phylum: Arthropoda
- Class: Insecta
- Order: Lepidoptera
- Family: Lycaenidae
- Subfamily: Polyommatinae
- Tribe: Polyommatini
- Genus: Lepidochrysops; Hedicke, 1923

Synonyms
- Neochrysops Bethune-Baker, [1923]

= Lepidochrysops =

Butterfly genus in family Lycaenidae

Lepidochrysops is a genus of butterflies in the family Lycaenidae. The members (species) are found in the Afrotropical realm.

They are medium-sized to fairly large (wingspan 30-50 millimetres) blues. The upper parts of the males have a slightly pale, pearlescent, blue or blue-violet sheen, the females are brown. The underparts are brownish with darker brown spots. The larvae often feed on herbs in the genus Selago. The genus is found only in the Afrotropical ecozone, most of the species live in southern and eastern Africa.

== Species ==
- Lepidochrysops aethiopia (Bethune-Baker, [1923])
- Lepidochrysops abri Libert & Collins, 2001
- Lepidochrysops albilinea Tite, 1959
- Lepidochrysops anerius (Hulstaert, 1924)
- Lepidochrysops ansorgei Tite, 1959
- Lepidochrysops arabicus Gabriel, 1954
- Lepidochrysops asteris (Godart, [1824])
- Lepidochrysops auratus Quickelberge, 1979
- Lepidochrysops australis Tite, 1964
- Lepidochrysops azureus (Butler, 1879)
- Lepidochrysops bacchus Riley, 1938
- Lepidochrysops badhami van Son, 1956
- Lepidochrysops balli Dickson, 1985
- Lepidochrysops barnesi Pennington, 1953
- Lepidochrysops braueri Dickson, 1966
- Lepidochrysops budama Someren, 1957
- Lepidochrysops caerulea Tite, 1961
- Lepidochrysops carsoni (Butler, 1901)
- Lepidochrysops chala Kielland, 1980
- Lepidochrysops chalceus Quickelberge, 1979
- Lepidochrysops chittyi Henning & Henning, 1994
- Lepidochrysops chloauges (Bethune-Baker, 1923)
- Lepidochrysops cinerea (Bethune-Baker, [1923])
- Lepidochrysops coxii Pinhey, 1945
- Lepidochrysops cupreus (Neave, 1910)
- Lepidochrysops delicata (Bethune-Baker, [1923])
- Lepidochrysops desmondi Stempffer, 1951
- Lepidochrysops dollmani (Bethune-Baker, [1923])
- Lepidochrysops dukei Cottrell, 1965
- Lepidochrysops dunni Larsen & Collins, 2003
- Lepidochrysops elgonae Stempffer, 1950
- Lepidochrysops erici Gardiner, 2003
- Lepidochrysops evae Gardiner, 2003
- Lepidochrysops flavisquamosa Tite, 1959
- Lepidochrysops forsskali Larsen, 1982
- Lepidochrysops fulvescens Tite, 1961
- Lepidochrysops fumosa (Butler, 1886)
- Lepidochrysops glauca (Trimen, 1887)
- Lepidochrysops grahami (Trimen, 1893)
- Lepidochrysops grandis Talbot, 1937
- Lepidochrysops guichardi Gabriel, 1949
- Lepidochrysops gydoae Dickson & Wykeham, 1994
- Lepidochrysops handmani Quickelberge, 1980
- Lepidochrysops haveni Larsen, 1983
- Lepidochrysops hawkeri (Talbot, 1929)
- Lepidochrysops heathi Gardiner, 1998
- Lepidochrysops hypopolia (Trimen, 1887)
- Lepidochrysops ignota (Trimen, 1887)
- Lepidochrysops intermedia (Bethune-Baker, [1923])
- Lepidochrysops inyangae Pinhey, 1945
- Lepidochrysops irvingi (Swanepoel, 1948)
- Lepidochrysops jacksoni van Someren, 1957
- Lepidochrysops jamesi Swanepoel, 1971
- Lepidochrysops jansei van Someren, 1957
- Lepidochrysops jefferyi (Swierstra, 1909)
- Lepidochrysops kennethi Kielland, 1986
- Lepidochrysops ketsi Cottrell, 1965
- Lepidochrysops kilimanjarensis (Strand, 1909)
- Lepidochrysops kitale (Stempffer, 1936)
- Lepidochrysops koaena (Strand, 1911)
- Lepidochrysops kocak Seven, 1997
- Lepidochrysops labeensis Larsen & Warren-Gash, 2000
- Lepidochrysops labwor van Someren, 1957
- Lepidochrysops lerothodi (Trimen, 1904)
- Lepidochrysops letsea (Trimen, 1870)
- Lepidochrysops leucon (Mabille, 1879)
- Lepidochrysops littoralis Swanepoel & Vári, 1983
- Lepidochrysops loewensteini (Swanepoel, 1951)
- Lepidochrysops longifalces Tite, 1961
- Lepidochrysops lotana Swanepoel, 1962
- Lepidochrysops loveni (Aurivillius, 1922)
- Lepidochrysops lukenia van Someren, 1957
- Lepidochrysops lunulifer (Ungemach, 1932)
- Lepidochrysops mashuna (Trimen, 1894)
- Lepidochrysops mcgregori Pennington, 1970
- Lepidochrysops methymna (Trimen, 1862)
- Lepidochrysops michaeli Gardiner, 2003
- Lepidochrysops michellae Henning & Henning, 1983
- Lepidochrysops miniata Gardiner, 2004
- Lepidochrysops mpanda Tite, 1961
- Lepidochrysops nacrescens Tite, 1961
- Lepidochrysops neavei (Bethune-Baker, [1923])
- Lepidochrysops negus (C. & R. Felder, [1865])
- Lepidochrysops neonegus (Bethune-Baker, [1923])
- Lepidochrysops nigritia Tite, 1959
- Lepidochrysops nyika Tite, 1961
- Lepidochrysops oosthuizeni Swanepoel & Vári, 1983
- Lepidochrysops oreas Tite, 1964

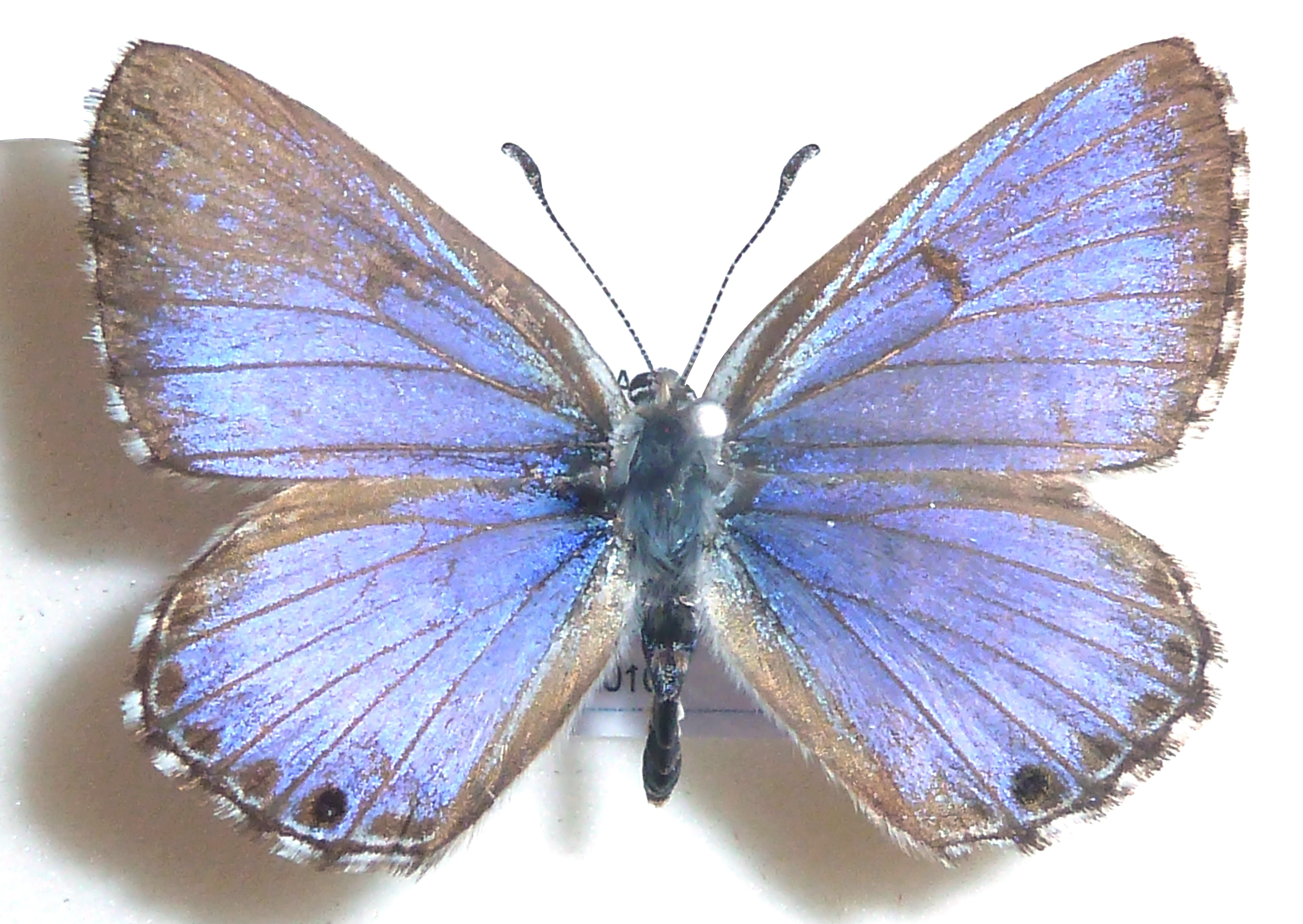
L. ortygia

- Lepidochrysops ortygia (Trimen, 1887)
- Lepidochrysops outeniqua Swanepoel & Vári, 1983
- Lepidochrysops pampolis (Druce, 1905)
- Lepidochrysops parsimon (Fabricius, 1775)

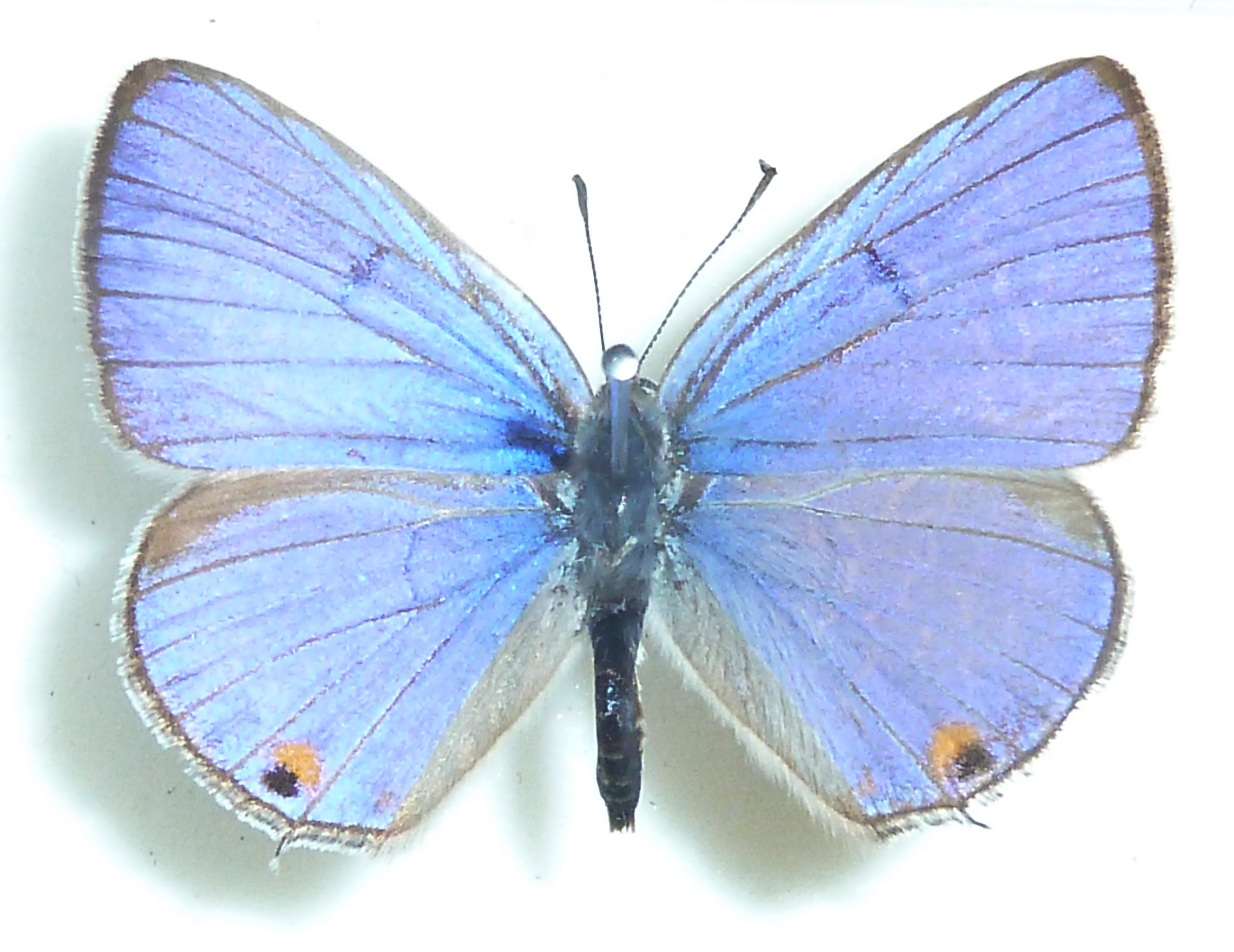
L. patricia

- Lepidochrysops patricia (Trimen, 1887)
- Lepidochrysops peculiaris (Rogenhofer, 1891)
- Lepidochrysops penningtoni Dickson, 1969
- Lepidochrysops pephredo (Trimen, 1889)
- Lepidochrysops phoebe Libert, 2001
- Lepidochrysops pittawayi Larsen, 1983

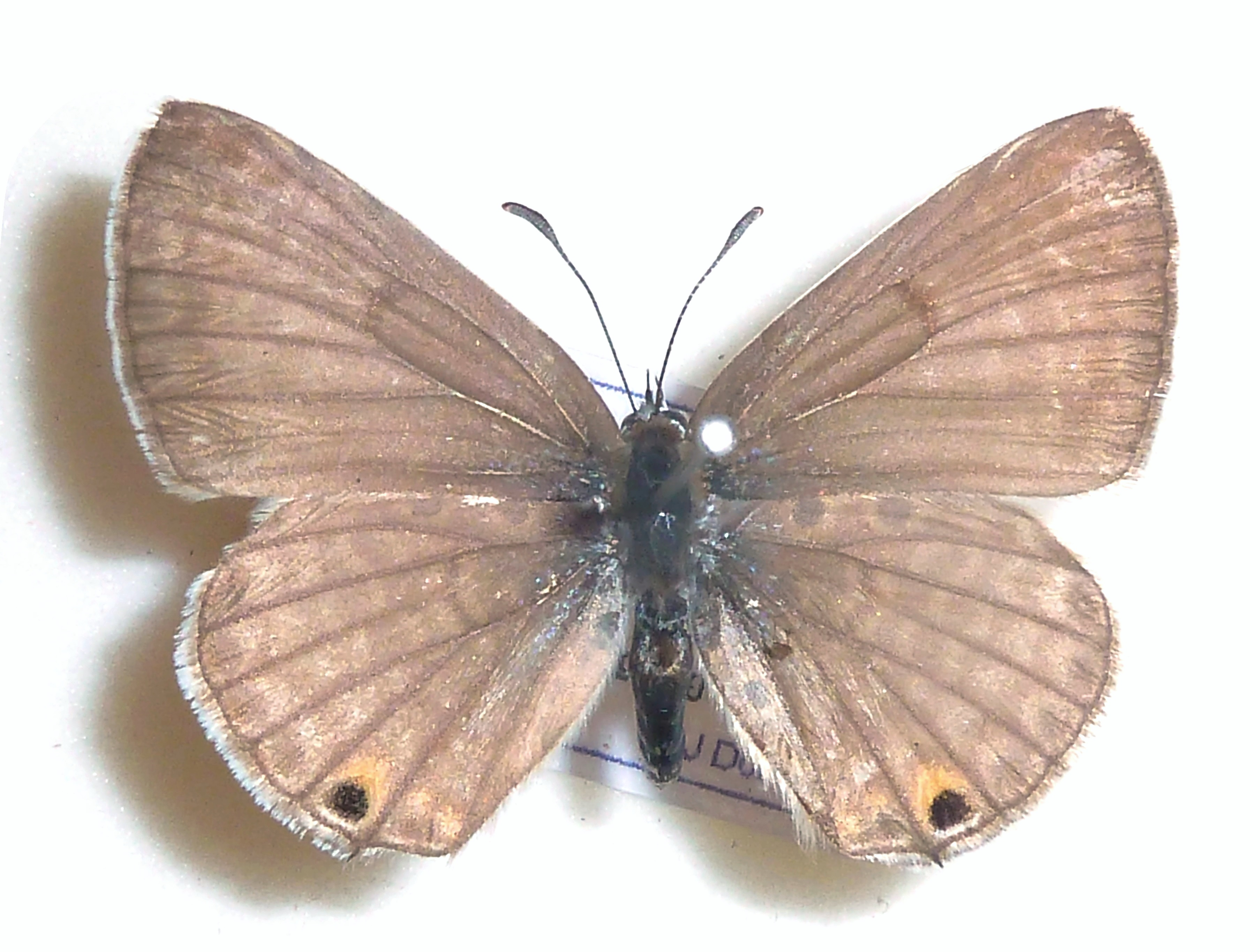
L. plebeja

- Lepidochrysops plebeja (Butler, 1898)
- Lepidochrysops polydialecta (Bethune-Baker, [1923])
- Lepidochrysops poseidon Pringle, 1987
- Lepidochrysops praeterita Swanepoel, 1962
- Lepidochrysops pringlei Dickson, 1982

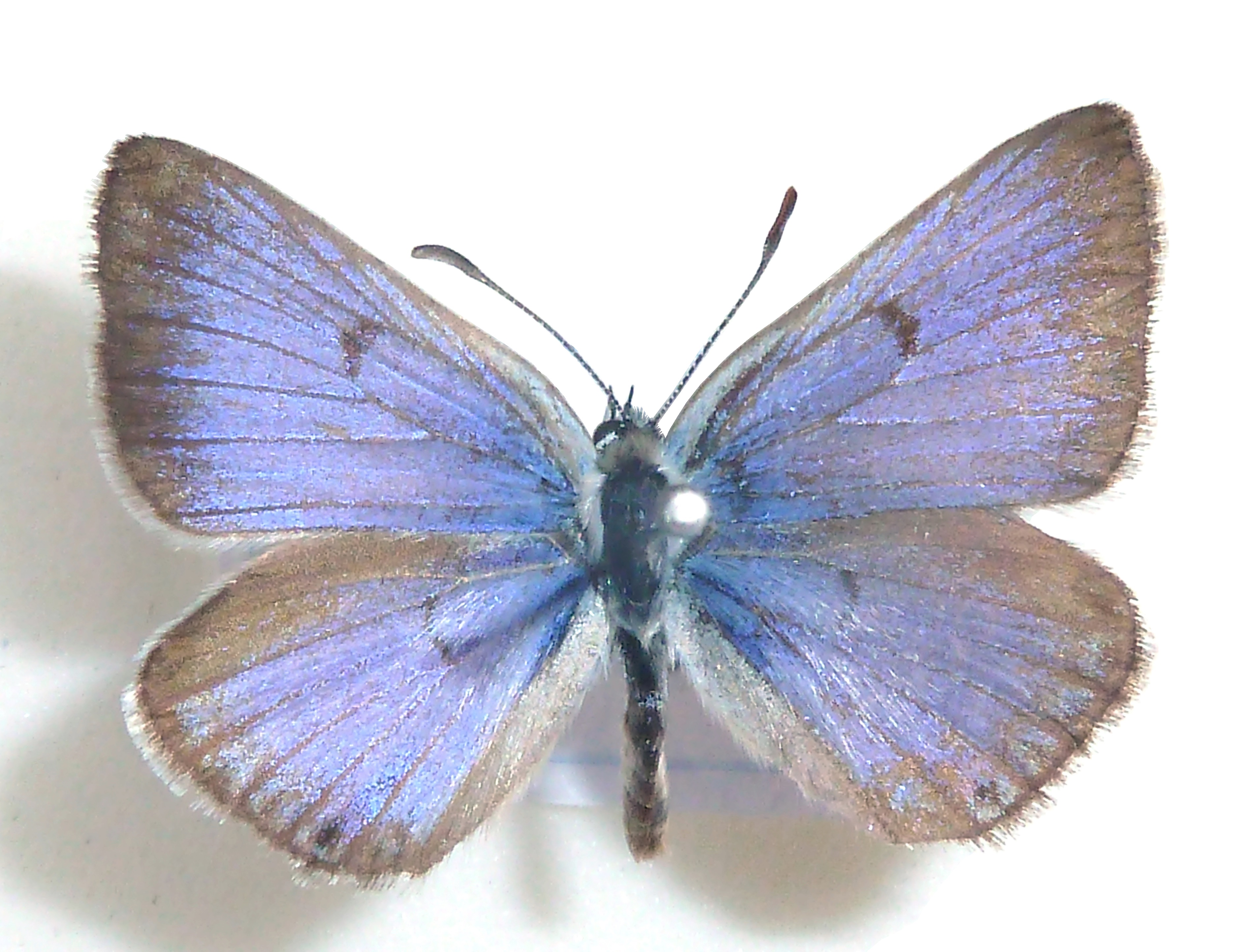
L. procera

- Lepidochrysops procera (Trimen, 1893)
- Lepidochrysops pterou (Bethune-Baker, [1923])
- Lepidochrysops puncticilia (Trimen, 1883)
- Lepidochrysops quassi (Karsch, 1895)
- Lepidochrysops quickelbergei Swanepoel, 1969
- Lepidochrysops reichenowii (Dewitz, 1879)
- Lepidochrysops rhodesensae (Bethune-Baker, [1923])
- Lepidochrysops ringa Tite, 1959
- Lepidochrysops robertsoni Cottrell, 1965
- Lepidochrysops rossouwi Henning & Henning, 1994
- Lepidochrysops ruthica Pennington, 1953
- Lepidochrysops skotios (Druce, 1905)
- Lepidochrysops solwezii (Bethune-Baker, 1923)
- Lepidochrysops southeyae Pennington, 1967
- Lepidochrysops stormsi (Robbe, 1892)
- Lepidochrysops subvariegata Talbot, 1935
- Lepidochrysops swanepoeli Pennington, 1948
- Lepidochrysops swartbergensis Swanepoel, 1969
- Lepidochrysops synchrematiza (Bethune-Baker, [1923])
- Lepidochrysops tantalus (Trimen, 1887)
- Lepidochrysops titei Dickson, 1976
- Lepidochrysops trimeni (Bethune-Baker, 1923)
- Lepidochrysops turlini Stempffer, 1971
- Lepidochrysops vansoni (Swanepoel, 1949)
- Lepidochrysops variabilis Cottrell, 1965
- Lepidochrysops vera Tite, 1961
- Lepidochrysops victori Pringle, 1984
- Lepidochrysops victoriae (Karsch, 1895)
- Lepidochrysops violetta (Pinhey, 1945)
- Lepidochrysops wykehami Tite, 1964
- Lepidochrysops yvonnae Gardiner, 2004
