= Lepidochrysops delicata =

Conservation status
- Data Deficient (IUCN 3.1)

Scientific classification
- Kingdom: Animalia
- Phylum: Arthropoda
- Class: Insecta
- Order: Lepidoptera
- Family: Lycaenidae
- Genus: Lepidochrysops
- Species: L. delicata

Binomial name
- Lepidochrysops delicata (Bethune-Baker, [1923])

Synonyms
- Neochrysops delicata Bethune-Baker, [1923]

Species of butterfly

Lepidochrysops delicata is a butterfly in the family Lycaenidae. It is found in Malawi and Mozambique.

Adults migrate from November to December.
