= Lepidochrysops barnesi =

Conservation status
- Least Concern (IUCN 3.1)

Scientific classification
- Kingdom: Animalia
- Phylum: Arthropoda
- Class: Insecta
- Order: Lepidoptera
- Family: Lycaenidae
- Genus: Lepidochrysops
- Species: L. barnesi

Binomial name
- Lepidochrysops barnesi Pennington, 1953

Species of butterfly

Lepidochrysops barnesi, the Barnes' blue, is a butterfly in the family Lycaenidae. It is found in the Chimanimani Mountains of Zimbabwe. The habitat consists of montane grassland at altitudes of about 1,800 metres.

Adults are on wing from mid-October to November.
