= Lepidochrysops desmondi =

Scientific classification
- Kingdom: Animalia
- Phylum: Arthropoda
- Clade: Pancrustacea
- Class: Insecta
- Order: Lepidoptera
- Family: Lycaenidae
- Genus: Lepidochrysops
- Species: L. desmondi

Binomial name
- Lepidochrysops desmondi Stempffer, 1951

Species of butterfly

Lepidochrysops desmondi, the Desmond's blue, is a butterfly in the family Lycaenidae. It is found in south-western Kenya, Tanzania, northern Malawi and Zambia. The habitat consists of Brachystegia woodland.

Both sexes are attracted to flowers. Adults are on wing year-round, with a peak in November.
