= Lepidochrysops ringa =

Scientific classification
- Kingdom: Animalia
- Phylum: Arthropoda
- Class: Insecta
- Order: Lepidoptera
- Family: Lycaenidae
- Genus: Lepidochrysops
- Species: L. ringa

Binomial name
- Lepidochrysops ringa Tite, 1959

Species of butterfly

Lepidochrysops ringa, the Tite's giant Cupid, is a butterfly in the family Lycaenidae. It is found in northern Nigeria and western Cameroon. The habitat consists of Guinea savanna.
