= Lepidochrysops arabicus =

Scientific classification
- Kingdom: Animalia
- Phylum: Arthropoda
- Class: Insecta
- Order: Lepidoptera
- Family: Lycaenidae
- Genus: Lepidochrysops
- Species: L. arabicus

Binomial name
- Lepidochrysops arabicus Gabriel, 1954

Species of butterfly

Lepidochrysops arabicus, the Arabian giant Cupid, is a butterfly in the family Lycaenidae. It is found in Yemen. The habitat consists of rocky meadows at altitudes ranging from 1,500 to 2,800 meters.

The length of the forewings is about 16 mm. Adults are on wing from September to October.

The larvae possibly feed on Nepeta deflersiana.
