= Lepidochrysops braueri =

Conservation status
- Least Concern (IUCN 3.1)

Scientific classification
- Kingdom: Animalia
- Phylum: Arthropoda
- Class: Insecta
- Order: Lepidoptera
- Family: Lycaenidae
- Genus: Lepidochrysops
- Species: L. braueri

Binomial name
- Lepidochrysops braueri Dickson, 1966

Species of butterfly

Lepidochrysops braueri, the Brauer's blue, is a butterfly of the family Lycaenidae. It is found in South Africa, where it found in fynbos on the Swartberg range from the Eastern Cape to Seweweekspoort and Klein Swartberg in the Western Cape. It is also found on the Rooiberg.

The wingspan is 33–37 mm for males and 34–38 mm for females. Adults are on wing from November to January. There is one generation per year.
