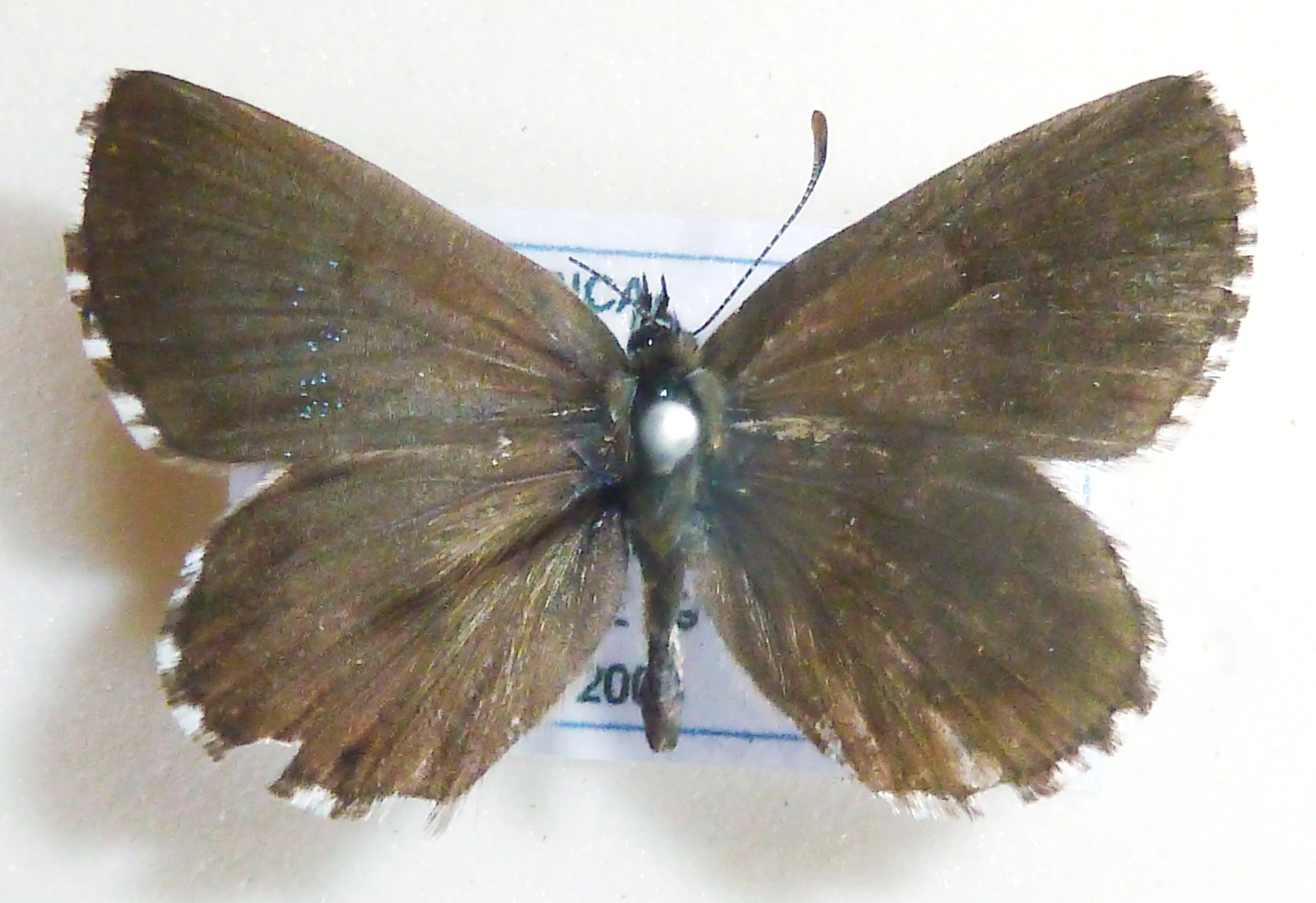

Conservation status
- Least Concern (IUCN 3.1)

Scientific classification
- Kingdom: Animalia
- Phylum: Arthropoda
- Class: Insecta
- Order: Lepidoptera
- Family: Lycaenidae
- Genus: Lepidochrysops
- Species: L. robertsoni

Binomial name
- Lepidochrysops robertsoni Cottrell, 1965

= Lepidochrysops robertsoni =

Robertson's blue

Species of butterfly

Lepidochrysops robertsoni, the Robertson's blue, is a butterfly of the family Lycaenidae. It is found in South Africa, from the Western Cape to Eastern Cape. It is also found in the Free State and possibly in Gauteng.

The wingspan is 28–32 mm for males and 29–33 mm for females. Adults are on wing from November to February. There is one extended generation per year.

The larvae feed on Selago species, including Selago serrata. Third and later instar larvae feed on the brood of Camponotus niveosetus ants.
