= Lepidochrysops fulvescens =

Scientific classification
- Kingdom: Animalia
- Phylum: Arthropoda
- Class: Insecta
- Order: Lepidoptera
- Family: Lycaenidae
- Genus: Lepidochrysops
- Species: L. fulvescens

Binomial name
- Lepidochrysops fulvescens Tite, 1961

Species of butterfly

Lepidochrysops fulvescens is a butterfly in the family Lycaenidae. It is found in the highlands of Angola.

Adults have been recorded in October and November.
