= Lepidochrysops lunulifer =

Scientific classification
- Kingdom: Animalia
- Phylum: Arthropoda
- Class: Insecta
- Order: Lepidoptera
- Family: Lycaenidae
- Genus: Lepidochrysops
- Species: L. lunulifer

Binomial name
- Lepidochrysops lunulifer (Ungemach, 1932)

Synonyms
- Euchrysops cinereus lunulifer Ungemach, 1932

Species of butterfly

Lepidochrysops lunulifer is a butterfly in the family Lycaenidae. It is found in Ethiopia.
