= Lepidochrysops outeniqua =

Conservation status
- Least Concern (IUCN 3.1)

Scientific classification
- Kingdom: Animalia
- Phylum: Arthropoda
- Class: Insecta
- Order: Lepidoptera
- Family: Lycaenidae
- Genus: Lepidochrysops
- Species: L. outeniqua

Binomial name
- Lepidochrysops outeniqua Swanepoel & Vári, 1983

Species of butterfly

Lepidochrysops outeniqua, the Outeniqua blue, is a species of butterfly in the family Lycaenidae. It is endemic to South Africa, where it is found in fynbos on the Outeniqua Mountains in the Western Cape.

The wingspan is 32–36 mm for males and 34–38 mm for females. Adults are on wing from November to December. There is one generation per year.
