= Lepidochrysops mpanda =

Scientific classification
- Kingdom: Animalia
- Phylum: Arthropoda
- Class: Insecta
- Order: Lepidoptera
- Family: Lycaenidae
- Genus: Lepidochrysops
- Species: L. mpanda

Binomial name
- Lepidochrysops mpanda Tite, 1961

Species of butterfly

Lepidochrysops mpanda is a butterfly in the family Lycaenidae. It is found in Tanzania (from the south-western part of the country to the Mpanda District). The habitat consists of montane grassland and grassland with stunted, deciduous vegetation at altitudes between 1,700 and 2,000 meters.

Adults have been recorded on wing in October.
