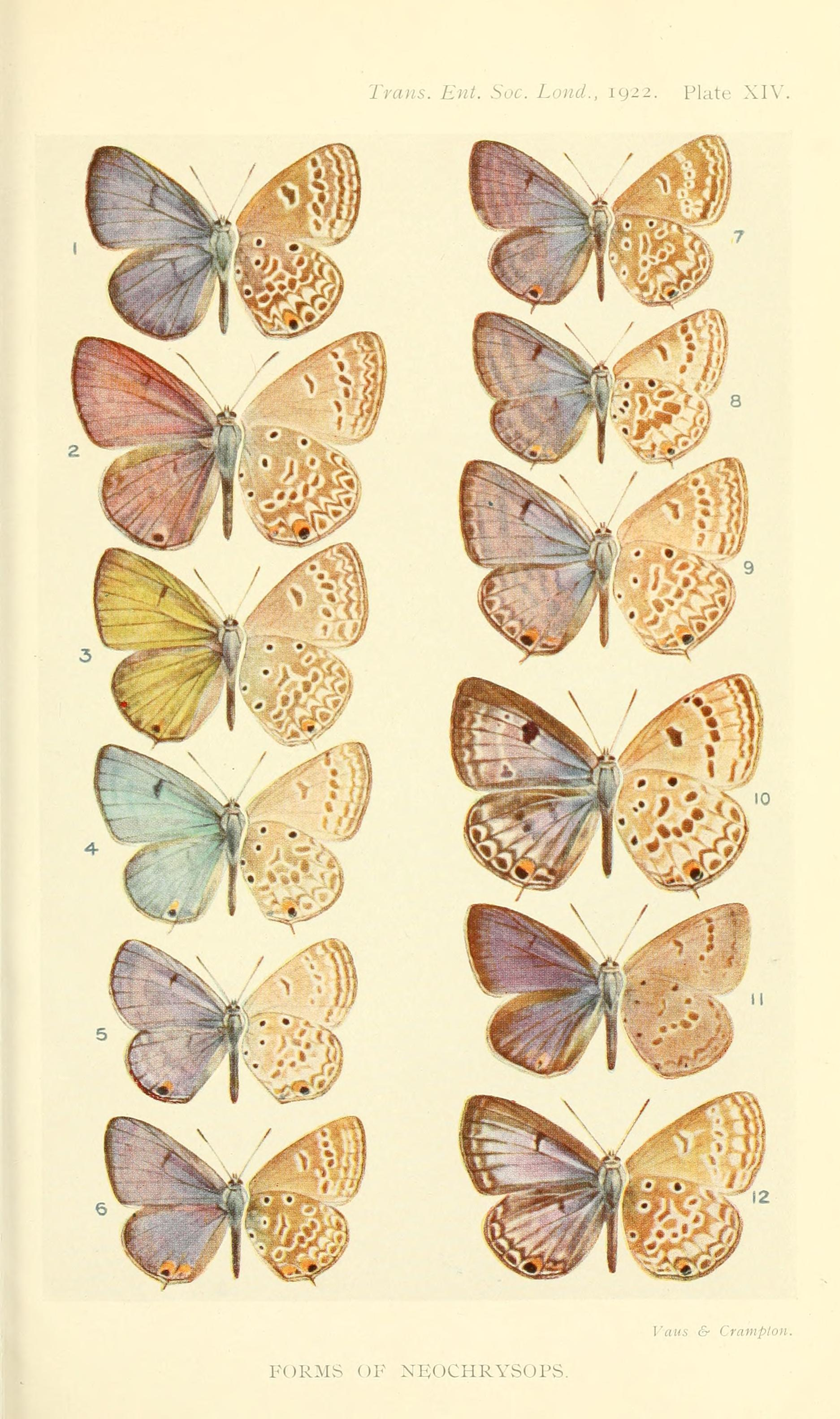
- figure 6

Scientific classification
- Kingdom: Animalia
- Phylum: Arthropoda
- Class: Insecta
- Order: Lepidoptera
- Family: Lycaenidae
- Genus: Lepidochrysops
- Species: L. carsoni

Binomial name
- Lepidochrysops carsoni (Butler, 1901)

Synonyms
- Catochrysops carsoni Butler, 1901; Neochrysops carsoni

= Lepidochrysops carsoni =

Species of butterfly

Lepidochrysops carsoni is a butterfly in the family Lycaenidae. It is found in Zambia.
