= Lepidochrysops evae =

Scientific classification
- Kingdom: Animalia
- Phylum: Arthropoda
- Class: Insecta
- Order: Lepidoptera
- Family: Lycaenidae
- Genus: Lepidochrysops
- Species: L. evae

Binomial name
- Lepidochrysops evae Gardiner, 2003

Species of butterfly

Lepidochrysops evae is a butterfly in the family Lycaenidae. It is found in north-western Zambia.

Adults have been recorded in October.

The larvae possibly feed on Ocimum species.

== Etymology ==
The species named for Eva Gardiner, wife of the author.
