= Lepidochrysops labwor =

Scientific classification
- Kingdom: Animalia
- Phylum: Arthropoda
- Class: Insecta
- Order: Lepidoptera
- Family: Lycaenidae
- Genus: Lepidochrysops
- Species: L. labwor

Binomial name
- Lepidochrysops labwor van Someren, 1957

Species of butterfly

Lepidochrysops labwor is a butterfly in the family Lycaenidae. It is found in Uganda (from Karamoja to the Labwor Range). The habitat consists of areas with short grass and flowers of the family Lamiaceae, amongst rock slabs and boulders.
