= Lepidochrysops azureus =

Scientific classification
- Kingdom: Animalia
- Phylum: Arthropoda
- Class: Insecta
- Order: Lepidoptera
- Family: Lycaenidae
- Genus: Lepidochrysops
- Species: L. azureus

Binomial name
- Lepidochrysops azureus (Butler, 1879)

Synonyms
- Castalius azureus Butler, 1879; Neochrysops azureus

Species of butterfly

Lepidochrysops azureus is a butterfly in the family Lycaenidae. It was described by Arthur Gardiner Butler in 1879. It is endemic to Madagascar. The habitat consists of forests.

The wingspan is 43–46 millimetres (1.7–1.8 in).
