= Lepidochrysops erici =

Scientific classification
- Kingdom: Animalia
- Phylum: Arthropoda
- Class: Insecta
- Order: Lepidoptera
- Family: Lycaenidae
- Genus: Lepidochrysops
- Species: L. erici

Binomial name
- Lepidochrysops erici Gardiner, 2003

Species of butterfly

Lepidochrysops erici is a butterfly in the family Lycaenidae. It lives in northwestern Zambia. Ocimum plants host the larvae and feed the adults while flowering in October.

== Etymology ==
The species is named for Eric Gardiner, son of the author, Alan Gardiner.
