= Lepidochrysops irvingi =

Conservation status
- Vulnerable (IUCN 3.1)

Scientific classification
- Kingdom: Animalia
- Phylum: Arthropoda
- Class: Insecta
- Order: Lepidoptera
- Family: Lycaenidae
- Genus: Lepidochrysops
- Species: L. irvingi

Binomial name
- Lepidochrysops irvingi (Swanepoel, 1948)

Synonyms
- Cupido irvingi Swanepoel, 1948

Species of butterfly

Lepidochrysops irvingi, the Irving's blue, is a butterfly of the family Lycaenidae. It is found in South Africa, where it is restricted to montane grassland in Eswatini and Mpumalanga.

The wingspan is 32–36 mm for males and 33–38 mm for females. Adults are on wing from September to November. There is one generation per year.

The larvae feed on Ocimum (basil) species, including Ocimum grandiflorum.
