= Lepidochrysops michellae =

Scientific classification
- Kingdom: Animalia
- Phylum: Arthropoda
- Clade: Pancrustacea
- Class: Insecta
- Order: Lepidoptera
- Family: Lycaenidae
- Genus: Lepidochrysops
- Species: L. michellae

Binomial name
- Lepidochrysops michellae Henning & Henning, 1983

Species of butterfly

Lepidochrysops michellae, the Michelle's blue, is a butterfly in the family Lycaenidae. It is found in north-eastern Namibia. The habitat consists of grassy areas in savanna.

Adults are on wing from September to April.
