= Lepidochrysops lukenia =

Scientific classification
- Kingdom: Animalia
- Phylum: Arthropoda
- Class: Insecta
- Order: Lepidoptera
- Family: Lycaenidae
- Genus: Lepidochrysops
- Species: L. lukenia

Binomial name
- Lepidochrysops lukenia van Someren, 1957

Species of butterfly

Lepidochrysops lukenia, the Lukenia blue, is a butterfly in the family Lycaenidae. It is found in Kenya (south and south-east of Nairobi) and north-eastern Tanzania.

The larvae feed on Lamiaceae species.
