= Lepidochrysops oreas =

Scientific classification
- Kingdom: Animalia
- Phylum: Arthropoda
- Class: Insecta
- Order: Lepidoptera
- Family: Lycaenidae
- Genus: Lepidochrysops
- Species: L. oreas

Binomial name
- Lepidochrysops oreas Tite, 1964

Species of butterfly

Lepidochrysops oreas, the peninsula blue, is a butterfly of the family Lycaenidae. It is found in South Africa, where it found in fynbos on the Swartberg range from the Eastern Cape to Seweweekspoort and Klein Swartberg in the Western Cape. It is also found on the Rooiberg.

The wingspan is 24–38 mm for males and 27–38 mm for females. Adults are on wing from October to February. There is one generation per year.

The larvae feed on Selago species, including Selago serrata.

== Subspecies ==
- Lepidochrysops oreas oreas (upper slopes of Cape Peninsula Mountains)
- Lepidochrysops oreas junae Dickson, 1974 (mountains east of Cape Flats)
