= Lepidochrysops koaena =

Scientific classification
- Kingdom: Animalia
- Phylum: Arthropoda
- Class: Insecta
- Order: Lepidoptera
- Family: Lycaenidae
- Genus: Lepidochrysops
- Species: L. koaena

Binomial name
- Lepidochrysops koaena (Strand, 1911)

Synonyms
- Cupido koaena Strand, 1911; Neochrysops koaena

Species of butterfly

Lepidochrysops koaena is a butterfly in the family Lycaenidae. It is found in northern Tanzania.
