= Lepidochrysops lerothodi =

Conservation status
- Least Concern (IUCN 3.1)

Scientific classification
- Kingdom: Animalia
- Phylum: Arthropoda
- Class: Insecta
- Order: Lepidoptera
- Family: Lycaenidae
- Genus: Lepidochrysops
- Species: L. lerothodi

Binomial name
- Lepidochrysops lerothodi (Trimen, 1904)

Synonyms
- Lycaena lerothodi Trimen, 1904; Neochrysops lerothodi

Species of butterfly

Lepidochrysops lerothodi, the Lesotho blue, is a butterfly of the family Lycaenidae. It is found mainly found in Lesotho. In South Africa it is only found on high mountain peaks in the Golden Gate Highlands in Limpopo province, the Free State and the Eastern Cape.

The wingspan is 32–36 mm for males and 33–38 mm for females. Adults are on wing from January to February. There is one generation per year.

The larvae feed on Selago flanaganii.
