= Lepidochrysops subvariegata =

Scientific classification
- Kingdom: Animalia
- Phylum: Arthropoda
- Class: Insecta
- Order: Lepidoptera
- Family: Lycaenidae
- Genus: Lepidochrysops
- Species: L. subvariegata

Binomial name
- Lepidochrysops subvariegata Talbot, 1935

Species of butterfly

Lepidochrysops subvariegata is a butterfly in the family Lycaenidae. It is found in Ethiopia.
