= Selago fruticosa =

Scientific classification
- Kingdom: Plantae
- Clade: Embryophytes
- Clade: Tracheophytes
- Clade: Angiosperms
- Clade: Eudicots
- Clade: Asterids
- Order: Lamiales
- Family: Scrophulariaceae
- Genus: Selago
- Species: S. fruticosa

Binomial name
- Selago fruticosa L.

Synonyms
- Selago fruticulosa Rolfe

Species of flowering plant

Selago fruticosa is a species of plant in the family Scrophulariaceae. It is a subshrub endemic to the southwestern Cape Provinces of South Africa.
