= List of butterflies of Zambia =

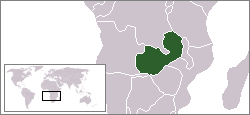
Location of Zambia

This is a list of butterflies of Zambia. About 900 species are known from Zambia, 27 of which are endemic.

== Papilionidae ==
=== Papilioninae ===
==== Papilionini ====
- Papilio nireus nireus Linnaeus, 1758
- Papilio nireus lyaeus Doubleday, 1845
- Papilio desmondi usambaraensis (Koçak, 1980)
- Papilio thuraui occidua Storace, 1951
- Papilio dardanus dardanus Brown, 1776
- Papilio dardanus tibullus Kirby, 1880
- Papilio constantinus constantinus Ward, 1871
- Papilio constantinus mweruanus Joicey & Talbot, 1927
- Papilio phorcas congoanus Rothschild, 1896
- Papilio phorcas nyikanus Rothschild & Jordan, 1903
- Papilio demodocus Esper, [1798]
- Papilio echerioides homeyeri Plötz, 1880
- Papilio jacksoni nyika Cottrell, 1963
- Papilio pelodurus vesper Le Cerf, 1924
- Papilio ophidicephalus ophidicephalus Oberthür, 1878
- Papilio ophidicephalus cottrelli van Son, 1966
- Papilio ophidicephalus mkuwadzi Gifford, 1961
- Papilio mackinnoni isokae (Hancock, 1984)
- Papilio mackinnoni theodori Riley, 1921

==== Leptocercini ====
- Graphium antheus (Cramer, 1779)
- Graphium policenes (Cramer, 1775)
- Graphium porthaon (Hewitson, 1865)
- Graphium angolanus (Goeze, 1779)
- Graphium taboranus (Oberthür, 1886)
- Graphium schaffgotschi (Niepelt, 1927)
- Graphium ridleyanus (White, 1843)
- Graphium leonidas (Fabricius, 1793)
- Graphium poggianus (Honrath, 1884)
- Graphium deliae Libert & Collins, 2007

== Pieridae ==
=== Pseudopontiinae ===
- Pseudopontia paradoxa (Felder & Felder, 1869)

=== Coliadinae ===
- Eurema brigitta (Stoll, [1780])
- Eurema desjardinsii marshalli (Butler, 1898)
- Eurema mandarinula (Holland, 1892)
- Eurema regularis (Butler, 1876)
- Eurema floricola leonis (Butler, 1886)
- Eurema hapale (Mabille, 1882)
- Eurema hecabe solifera (Butler, 1875)
- Eurema senegalensis (Boisduval, 1836)
- Eurema upembana (Berger, 1981)
- Catopsilia florella (Fabricius, 1775)
- Colias electo electo (Linnaeus, 1763)
- Colias electo hecate Strecker, 1905

=== Pierinae ===
- Colotis amata calais (Cramer, 1775)
- Colotis antevippe gavisa (Wallengren, 1857)
- Colotis aurigineus (Butler, 1883)
- Colotis celimene amina (Hewitson, 1866)
- Colotis danae annae (Wallengren, 1857)
- Colotis dissociatus (Butler, 1897)
- Colotis euippe mediata Talbot, 1939
- Colotis evagore antigone (Boisduval, 1836)
- Colotis evenina casta (Gerstaecker, 1871)
- Colotis hildebrandtii (Staudinger, 1884)
- Colotis incretus (Butler, 1881)
- Colotis ione (Godart, 1819)
- Colotis pallene (Hopffer, 1855)
- Colotis regina (Trimen, 1863)
- Colotis vesta mutans (Butler, 1877)
- Colotis vesta rhodesinus (Butler, 1894)
- Colotis eris (Klug, 1829)
- Colotis subfasciatus ducissa (Dognin, 1891)
- Eronia cleodora Hübner, 1823
- Eronia leda (Boisduval, 1847)
- Pinacopterix eriphia (Godart, [1819])
- Nepheronia argia argolisia (Stoneham, 1957)
- Nepheronia argia mhondana (Suffert, 1904)
- Nepheronia buquetii (Boisduval, 1836)
- Nepheronia thalassina sinalata (Suffert, 1904)
- Nepheronia thalassina verulanus (Ward, 1871)
- Leptosia alcesta inalcesta Bernardi, 1959
- Leptosia hybrida somereni Bernardi, 1959
- Leptosia nupta pseudonupta Bernardi, 1959

==== Pierini ====
- Appias epaphia contracta (Butler, 1888)
- Appias sabina (Felder & Felder, [1865])
- Appias sylvia nyasana (Butler, 1897)
- Mylothris agathina (Cramer, 1779)
- Mylothris alcuana shaba Berger, 1981
- Mylothris bernice overlaeti Berger, 1981
- Mylothris crawshayi Butler, 1896
- Mylothris mavunda Hancock & Heath, 1985 (endemic)
- Mylothris rhodope (Fabricius, 1775)
- Mylothris rubricosta (Mabille, 1890)
- Mylothris rueppellii rhodesiana Riley, 1921
- Mylothris sagala albissima Talbot, 1944
- Mylothris sagala dentatus Butler, 1896
- Mylothris schumanni zairiensis Berger, 1981
- Mylothris similis dollmani Riley, 1921
- Mylothris yulei Butler, 1897
- Dixeia doxo parva Talbot, 1943
- Dixeia leucophanes Vári, 1976
- Dixeia pigea (Boisduval, 1836)
- Belenois aurota (Fabricius, 1793)
- Belenois calypso crawshayi Butler, 1894
- Belenois creona severina (Stoll, 1781)
- Belenois diminuta Butler, 1894
- Belenois gidica abyssinica (Lucas, 1852)
- Belenois rubrosignata (Weymer, 1901)
- Belenois thysa (Hopffer, 1855)
- Belenois welwitschii welwitschii Rogenhofer, 1890
- Belenois welwitschii shaba Berger, 1981
- Belenois zochalia agrippinides (Holland, 1896)

== Lycaenidae ==
=== Miletinae ===
==== Liphyrini ====
- Aslauga latifurca Cottrell, 1981
- Aslauga marshalli Butler, 1899
- Aslauga orientalis Cottrell, 1981
- Aslauga purpurascens Holland, 1890
- slauga vininga kiellandi Libert, 1997

==== Miletini ====
- Megalopalpus zymna (Westwood, 1851)
- Spalgis lemolea Druce, 1890
- Lachnocnema bibulus (Fabricius, 1793)
- Lachnocnema durbani Trimen & Bowker, 1887
- Lachnocnema intermedia Libert, 1996
- Lachnocnema regularis Libert, 1996
- Lachnocnema brimoides Libert, 1996
- Lachnocnema disrupta Talbot, 1935

=== Poritiinae ===
==== Liptenini ====
- Alaena amazoula nyasana Hawker-Smith, 1933
- Alaena nyassa marmorata Hawker-Smith, 1933
- Alaena reticulata Butler, 1896
- Alaena unimaculosa aurantiaca Butler, 1895
- Pentila pauli elisabetha Hulstaert, 1924
- Pentila pauli nyassana Aurivillius, 1899
- Pentila pauli obsoleta Hawker-Smith, 1933
- Pentila umangiana meridionalis Berger, 1981
- Telipna nyanza katangae Stempffer, 1961
- Ornipholidotos katangae Stempffer, 1947
- Ornipholidotos overlaeti Stempffer, 1947
- Ornipholidotos peucetia (Hewitson, 1866)
- Cooksonia neavei rhodesiae Pinhey, 1962
- Mimacraea marshalli Trimen, 1898
- Mimacraea skoptoles Druce, 1907
- Liptena eukrines Druce, 1905
- Liptena homeyeri Dewitz, 1884
- Liptena lualaba Berger, 1981
- Liptena praestans congoensis Schultze, 1923
- Liptena xanthostola xantha (Grose-Smith, 1901)
- Eresina bilinea Talbot, 1935
- Eresina katangana Stempffer, 1956
- Eresina toroensis Joicey & Talbot, 1921
- Citrinophila terias Joicey & Talbot, 1921
- Argyrocheila bitje Bethune-Baker, 1915
- Teriomima puella Kirby, 1887
- Teriomima puellaris (Trimen, 1894)
- Baliochila hildegarda (Kirby, 1887)
- Cnodontes pallida (Trimen, 1898)
- Cnodontes vansomereni Stempffer & Bennett, 1953

==== Epitolini ====
- Toxochitona sankuru Stempffer, 1961
- Teratoneura congoensis Stempffer, 1954
- Cerautola crowleyi congdoni Libert & Collins, 1999
- Cerautola fisheri Libert & Collins, 1999 (endemic)
- Cerautola miranda vidua (Talbot, 1935)
- Stempfferia ginettae meridionalis Libert, 1999
- Cephetola izidori zambeziae Libert & Collins, 1999
- Cephetola katerae (Jackson, 1962)
- Cephetola viridana (Joicey & Talbot, 1921)
- Deloneura subfusca Hawker-Smith, 1933
- Hewitsonia kirbyi Dewitz, 1879

=== Aphnaeinae ===
- Pseudaletis mazanguli Neave, 1910
- Lipaphnaeus eustorgia (Hulstaert, 1924)
- Lipaphnaeus leonina bitje (Druce, 1910)
- Lipaphnaeus leonina loxura (Rebel, 1914)
- Chloroselas mazoensis (Trimen, 1898)
- Chloroselas overlaeti Stempffer, 1956
- Chloroselas pseudozeritis (Trimen, 1873)
- Crudaria leroma (Wallengren, 1857)
- Cigaritis brunnea (Jackson, 1966)
- Cigaritis cynica (Riley, 1921)
- Cigaritis ella (Hewitson, 1865)
- Cigaritis homeyeri (Dewitz, 1887)
- Cigaritis modestus heathi (d'Abrera, 1980)
- Cigaritis mozambica (Bertoloni, 1850)
- Cigaritis natalensis (Westwood, 1851)
- Cigaritis overlaeti (Bouyer, 1998)
- Cigaritis phanes (Trimen, 1873)
- Cigaritis pinheyi (Heath, 1983) (endemic)
- Cigaritis trimeni (Neave, 1910)
- Zeritis fontainei Stempffer, 1956
- Zeritis sorhagenii (Dewitz, 1879)
- Axiocerses tjoane tjoane (Wallengren, 1857)
- Axiocerses tjoane rubescens Henning & Henning, 1996
- Axiocerses bambana orichalcea Henning & Henning, 1996
- Axiocerses nyika Quickelberge, 1984
- Axiocerses heathi Henning & Henning, 1996 (endemic)
- Axiocerses melanica melanica Henning & Henning, 1996 (endemic)
- Axiocerses melanica aurata Henning & Henning, 1996 (endemic)
- Axiocerses coalescens Henning & Henning, 1996
- Axiocerses amanga (Westwood, 1881)
- Aloeides damarensis mashona Tite & Dickson, 1973
- Aloeides conradsi angoniensis Tite & Dickson, 1973
- Aloeides molomo mumbuensis Riley, 1921
- Aloeides griseus Riley, 1921 (endemic)
- Erikssonia acraeina Trimen, 1891
- Erikssonia alaponoxa Henning & Henning, 2001 (endemic)
- Aphnaeus affinis Riley, 1921
- Aphnaeus erikssoni erikssoni Trimen, 1891
- Aphnaeus erikssoni rex Aurivillius, 1909
- Aphnaeus flavescens Stempffer, 1954
- Aphnaeus marshalli Neave, 1910
- Aphnaeus orcas (Drury, 1782)
- Aphnaeus questiauxi Aurivillius, 1903

=== Theclinae ===
- Myrina dermaptera nyassae Talbot, 1935
- Myrina silenus silenus (Fabricius, 1775)
- Myrina silenus ficedula Trimen, 1879
- Oxylides feminina (Sharpe, 1904)
- Dapidodigma demeter nuptus Clench, 1961
- Hypolycaena antifaunus (Westwood, 1851)
- Hypolycaena auricostalis (Butler, 1897)
- Hypolycaena buxtoni spurcus Talbot, 1929
- Hypolycaena hatita japhusa Riley, 1921
- Hypolycaena liara plana Talbot, 1935
- Hypolycaena pachalica Butler, 1888
- Hypolycaena philippus (Fabricius, 1793)
- Hemiolaus caeculus caeculus (Hopffer, 1855)
- Hemiolaus caeculus vividus Pinhey, 1962
- Leptomyrina hirundo (Wallengren, 1857)
- Leptomyrina gorgias sobrina Talbot, 1935
- Leptomyrina handmani Gifford, 1965
- Iolaus bolissus Hewitson, 1873
- Iolaus alienus Trimen, 1898
- Iolaus aurivillii Röber, 1900
- Iolaus australis Stevenson, 1937
- Iolaus bakeri (Riley, 1928)
- Iolaus coelestis Bethune-Baker, 1926
- Iolaus congdoni (Kielland, 1985)
- Iolaus cytaeis caerulea (Riley, 1928)
- Iolaus dubiosa (Stempffer & Bennett, 1959)
- Iolaus farquharsoni (Bethune-Baker, 1922)
- Iolaus flavilinea (Riley, 1928)
- Iolaus helenae Henning & Henning, 1989 (endemic)
- Iolaus mimosae rhodosense (Stempffer & Bennett, 1959)
- Iolaus nasisii (Riley, 1928)
- Iolaus nolaensis amanica (Stempffer, 1951)
- Iolaus penningtoni (Stempffer & Bennett, 1959)
- Iolaus pollux albocaerulea (Riley, 1929)
- Iolaus sibella (Druce, 1910)
- Iolaus sidus Trimen, 1864
- Iolaus stenogrammica (Riley, 1928)
- Iolaus violacea (Riley, 1928)
- Iolaus pallene (Wallengren, 1857)
- Iolaus trimeni Wallengren, 1875
- Iolaus gabunica (Riley, 1928)
- Iolaus iulus Hewitson, 1869
- Iolaus poecilaon fisheri Heath, 1983
- Iolaus aequatorialis (Stempffer & Bennett, 1958)
- Iolaus cottrelli (Stempffer & Bennett, 1958)
- Iolaus dianae Heath, 1983 (endemic)
- Iolaus ndolae (Stempffer & Bennett, 1958)
- Iolaus pamae Heath, 1994
- Iolaus silarus Druce, 1885
- Iolaus stewarti Heath, 1985 (endemic)
- Iolaus catori cottoni Bethune-Baker, 1908
- Stugeta bowkeri maria Suffert, 1904
- Stugeta bowkeri tearei Dickson, 1980
- Pilodeudorix mimeta (Karsch, 1895)
- Pilodeudorix anetia (Hulstaert, 1924)
- Pilodeudorix bemba (Neave, 1910) (endemic)
- Pilodeudorix kafuensis (Neave, 1910)
- Pilodeudorix mera (Hewitson, 1873)
- Pilodeudorix otraeda genuba (Hewitson, 1875)
- Pilodeudorix obscurata (Trimen, 1891)
- Pilodeudorix camerona katanga (Clench, 1965)
- Pilodeudorix congoana orientalis (Stempffer, 1957)
- Pilodeudorix zela (Hewitson, 1869)
- Pilodeudorix zeloides (Butler, 1901)
- Pilodeudorix zelomina (Rebel, 1914)
- Hypomyrina nomenia extensa Libert, 2004
- Deudorix antalus (Hopffer, 1855)
- Deudorix badhami Carcasson, 1961
- Deudorix caliginosa Lathy, 1903
- Deudorix dinochares Grose-Smith, 1887
- Deudorix dinomenes Grose-Smith, 1887
- Deudorix diocles Hewitson, 1869
- Deudorix jacksoni Talbot, 1935
- Deudorix kayonza Stempffer, 1956
- Deudorix lorisona coffea Jackson, 1966
- Deudorix magda Gifford, 1963
- Deudorix ufipa Kielland, 1978
- Capys brunneus heathi Henning & Henning, 1988
- Capys catharus Riley, 1932
- Capys connexivus connexivus Butler, 1897
- Capys connexivus gardineri Henning & Henning, 1988

=== Lycaeninae ===
- Lycaena phlaeas abbottii (Holland, 1892)

=== Polyommatinae ===
==== Lycaenesthini ====
- Anthene amarah (Guérin-Méneville, 1849)
- Anthene arnoldi (N. Jones, 1918)
- Anthene butleri livida (Trimen, 1881)
- Anthene contrastata mashuna (Stevenson, 1937)
- Anthene crawshayi (Butler, 1899)
- Anthene definita (Butler, 1899)
- Anthene irumu (Stempffer, 1948)
- Anthene kersteni (Gerstaecker, 1871)
- Anthene lemnos (Hewitson, 1878)
- Anthene ligures (Hewitson, 1874)
- Anthene liodes (Hewitson, 1874)
- Anthene lunulata (Trimen, 1894)
- Anthene mpanda Kielland, 1990
- Anthene nigropunctata (Bethune-Baker, 1910)
- Anthene otacilia (Trimen, 1868)
- Anthene princeps (Butler, 1876)
- Anthene rhodesiana Stempffer, 1962
- Anthene rubricinctus anadema (Druce, 1905)
- Anthene wilsoni (Talbot, 1935)
- Anthene gemmifera (Neave, 1910)
- Anthene nigeriae (Aurivillius, 1905)
- Cupidesthes arescopa (Stempffer, 1962)
- Cupidesthes vidua Talbot, 1929

==== Polyommatini ====
- Cupidopsis cissus (Godart, [1824])
- Cupidopsis jobates (Hopffer, 1855)
- Pseudonacaduba aethiops (Mabille, 1877)
- Pseudonacaduba sichela (Wallengren, 1857)
- Lampides boeticus (Linnaeus, 1767)
- Uranothauma crawshayi Butler, 1895
- Uranothauma cuneatum Tite, 1958
- Uranothauma falkensteini (Dewitz, 1879)
- Uranothauma heritsia virgo (Butler, 1896)
- Uranothauma nubifer (Trimen, 1895)
- Uranothauma poggei (Dewitz, 1879)
- Uranothauma vansomereni Stempffer, 1951
- Uranothauma williamsi Carcasson, 1961
- Cacyreus lingeus (Stoll, 1782)
- Cacyreus marshalli Butler, 1898
- Cacyreus tespis (Herbst, 1804)
- Cacyreus virilis Stempffer, 1936
- Harpendyreus hazelae Stempffer, 1973
- Harpendyreus juno (Butler, 1897)
- Harpendyreus major (Joicey & Talbot, 1924)
- Leptotes babaulti (Stempffer, 1935)
- Leptotes brevidentatus (Tite, 1958)
- Leptotes jeanneli (Stempffer, 1935)
- Leptotes marginalis (Stempffer, 1944)
- Leptotes pirithous (Linnaeus, 1767)
- Leptotes pulchra (Murray, 1874)
- Tuxentius calice (Hopffer, 1855)
- Tuxentius ertli (Aurivillius, 1907)
- Tuxentius melaena (Trimen & Bowker, 1887)
- Tarucus sybaris (Hopffer, 1855)
- Zintha hintza (Trimen, 1864)
- Zizeeria knysna (Trimen, 1862)
- Zizina antanossa (Mabille, 1877)
- Actizera lucida (Trimen, 1883)
- Actizera stellata (Trimen, 1883)
- Zizula hylax (Fabricius, 1775)
- Azanus jesous (Guérin-Méneville, 1849)
- Azanus mirza (Plötz, 1880)
- Azanus moriqua (Wallengren, 1857)
- Azanus natalensis (Trimen & Bowker, 1887)
- Azanus ubaldus (Stoll, 1782)
- Azanus isis (Drury, 1773)
- Eicochrysops eicotrochilus Bethune-Baker, 1924
- Eicochrysops hippocrates (Fabricius, 1793)
- Eicochrysops messapus mahallakoaena (Wallengren, 1857)
- Eicochrysops pinheyi Heath, 1985 (endemic)
- Euchrysops albistriata (Capronnier, 1889)
- Euchrysops barkeri (Trimen, 1893)
- Euchrysops katangae Bethune-Baker, 1923
- Euchrysops malathana (Boisduval, 1833)
- Euchrysops osiris (Hopffer, 1855)
- Euchrysops subpallida Bethune-Baker, 1923
- Euchrysops unigemmata (Butler, 1895)
- Thermoniphas distincta (Talbot, 1935)
- Thermoniphas fontainei Stempffer, 1956
- Thermoniphas colorata (Ungemach, 1932)
- Oboronia albicosta (Gaede, 1916)
- Oboronia guessfeldti (Dewitz, 1879)
- Freyeria trochylus (Freyer, [1843])
- Lepidochrysops aethiopia (Bethune-Baker, [1923])
- Lepidochrysops anerius (Hulstaert, 1924)
- Lepidochrysops ansorgei Tite, 1959
- Lepidochrysops auratus Quickelberge, 1979
- Lepidochrysops carsoni (Butler, 1901) (endemic)
- Lepidochrysops chala Kielland, 1980
- Lepidochrysops chalceus Quickelberge, 1979
- Lepidochrysops chloauges (Bethune-Baker, [1923])
- Lepidochrysops cinerea (Bethune-Baker, [1923])
- Lepidochrysops cupreus (Neave, 1910)
- Lepidochrysops desmondi Stempffer, 1951
- Lepidochrysops dollmani (Bethune-Baker, [1923])
- Lepidochrysops erici Gardiner, 2003 (endemic)
- Lepidochrysops evae Gardiner, 2003 (endemic)
- Lepidochrysops glauca (Trimen & Bowker, 1887)
- Lepidochrysops handmani Quickelberge, 1980
- Lepidochrysops heathi Gardiner, 1998 (endemic)
- Lepidochrysops intermedia cottrelli Stempffer, 1954
- Lepidochrysops kocak Seven, 1997
- Lepidochrysops longifalces Tite, 1961
- Lepidochrysops loveni (Aurivillius, 1922)
- Lepidochrysops michaeli Gardiner, 2003 (endemic)
- Lepidochrysops miniata Gardiner, 2004 (endemic)
- Lepidochrysops nyika Tite, 1961
- Lepidochrysops pampolis (Druce, 1905)
- Lepidochrysops peculiaris hypoleucus (Butler, 1893)
- Lepidochrysops plebeia (Butler, 1898)
- Lepidochrysops rhodesensae (Bethune-Baker, [1923]) (endemic)
- Lepidochrysops skotios (Druce, 1905)
- Lepidochrysops solwezii (Bethune-Baker, [1923])
- Lepidochrysops stormsi (Robbe, 1892)
- Lepidochrysops yvonnae Gardiner, 2004 (endemic)

== Riodinidae ==
=== Nemeobiinae ===
- Abisara dewitzi Aurivillius, 1898
- Abisara rogersi Druce, 1878
- Abisara neavei dollmani Riley, 1932

== Nymphalidae ==
=== Libytheinae ===
- Libythea labdaca laius Trimen, 1879

=== Danainae ===
==== Danaini ====
- Danaus chrysippus orientis (Aurivillius, 1909)
- Tirumala formosa (Godman, 1880)
- Tirumala petiverana (Doubleday, 1847)
- Amauris niavius niavius (Linnaeus, 1758)
- Amauris niavius dominicanus Trimen, 1879
- Amauris tartarea tartarea Mabille, 1876
- Amauris tartarea damoclides Staudinger, 1896
- Amauris albimaculata latifascia Talbot, 1940
- Amauris crawshayi simulator Talbot, 1926
- Amauris dannfelti restricta Talbot, 1940
- Amauris echeria katangae Neave, 1910
- Amauris echeria serica Talbot, 1940
- Amauris ellioti junia (Le Cerf, 1920)
- Amauris hyalites Butler, 1874
- Amauris ochlea bumilleri Lanz, 1896

=== Satyrinae ===
==== Melanitini ====
- Gnophodes betsimena parmeno Doubleday, 1849
- Melanitis leda (Linnaeus, 1758)
- Melanitis libya Distant, 1882
- Aphysoneura pigmentaria latilimba Le Cerf, 1919

==== Satyrini ====
- Bicyclus angulosa selousi (Trimen, 1895)
- Bicyclus anynana anynana (Butler, 1879)
- Bicyclus anynana centralis Condamin, 1968
- Bicyclus campina (Aurivillius, 1901)
- Bicyclus cooksoni (Druce, 1905)
- Bicyclus cottrelli (van Son, 1952)
- Bicyclus dubia (Aurivillius, 1893)
- Bicyclus ena (Hewitson, 1877)
- Bicyclus jefferyi Fox, 1963
- Bicyclus mandanes Hewitson, 1873
- Bicyclus mesogena (Karsch, 1894)
- Bicyclus moyses Condamin & Fox, 1964
- Bicyclus safitza (Westwood, 1850)
- Bicyclus sandace (Hewitson, 1877)
- Bicyclus saussurei (Dewitz, 1879)
- Bicyclus sebetus (Hewitson, 1877)
- Bicyclus simulacris Kielland, 1990
- Bicyclus sophrosyne overlaeti Condamin, 1965
- Bicyclus suffusa (Riley, 1921)
- Bicyclus trilophus (Rebel, 1914)
- Bicyclus vansoni Condamin, 1965
- Bicyclus vulgaris (Butler, 1868)
- Heteropsis centralis (Aurivillius, 1903)
- Heteropsis perspicua (Trimen, 1873)
- Heteropsis phaea (Karsch, 1894)
- Heteropsis simonsii (Butler, 1877)
- Heteropsis teratia (Karsch, 1894)
- Heteropsis ubenica (Thurau, 1903)
- Ypthima antennata van Son, 1955
- Ypthima condamini Kielland, 1982
- Ypthima congoana Overlaet, 1955
- Ypthima diplommata Overlaet, 1954
- Ypthima granulosa Butler, 1883
- Ypthima impura paupera Ungemach, 1932
- Ypthima praestans Overlaet, 1954
- Ypthima pulchra Overlaet, 1954
- Ypthima pupillaris Butler, 1888
- Ypthima recta Overlaet, 1955
- Ypthima rhodesiana Carcasson, 1961
- Ypthimomorpha itonia (Hewitson, 1865)
- Neocoenyra cooksoni Druce, 1907
- Neocoenyra kivuensis Seydel, 1929
- Neocoenyra ypthimoides Butler, 1894
- Coenyropsis bera (Hewitson, 1877)
- Physcaeneura pione Godman, 1880
- Neita extensa (Butler, 1898)

=== Charaxinae ===
==== Charaxini ====
- Charaxes varanes vologeses (Mabille, 1876)
- Charaxes fulvescens monitor Rothschild, 1900
- Charaxes acuminatus cottrelli van Someren, 1963
- Charaxes acuminatus nyika van Someren, 1963
- Charaxes candiope (Godart, 1824)
- Charaxes protoclea azota (Hewitson, 1877)
- Charaxes protoclea catenaria Rousseau-Decelle, 1934
- Charaxes macclounii Butler, 1895
- Charaxes cynthia sabulosus Talbot, 1928
- Charaxes lucretius intermedius van Someren, 1971
- Charaxes lucretius schofieldi Plantrou, 1989
- Charaxes jasius saturnus Butler, 1866
- Charaxes castor (Cramer, 1775)
- Charaxes brutus angustus Rothschild, 1900
- Charaxes brutus natalensis Staudinger, 1885
- Charaxes ansorgei levicki Poulton, 1933
- Charaxes pollux pollux (Cramer, 1775)
- Charaxes pollux geminus Rothschild, 1900
- Charaxes druceanus proximans Joicey & Talbot, 1922
- Charaxes eudoxus mechowi Rothschild, 1900
- Charaxes eudoxus mitchelli Plantrou & Howarth, 1977
- Charaxes eudoxus zambiae van Someren, 1970
- Charaxes numenes aequatorialis van Someren, 1972
- Charaxes tiridates tiridatinus Röber, 1936
- Charaxes murphyi Collins, 1989
- Charaxes bohemani Felder & Felder, 1859
- Charaxes xiphares ludovici Rousseau-Decelle, 1933
- Charaxes cithaeron joanae van Someren, 1964
- Charaxes imperialis lisomboensis van Someren, 1975
- Charaxes ameliae amelina Joicey & Talbot, 1925
- Charaxes pythodoris pythodoris Hewitson, 1873
- Charaxes pythodoris sumbuensis Henning, 1982
- Charaxes penricei Rothschild, 1900
- Charaxes achaemenes Felder & Felder, 1867
- Charaxes jahlusa argynnides Westwood, 1864
- Charaxes eupale veneris White & Grant, 1989
- Charaxes dilutus Rothschild, 1898
- Charaxes anticlea proadusta van Someren, 1971
- Charaxes baumanni selousi Trimen, 1894
- Charaxes baumanni whytei Butler, 1894
- Charaxes hildebrandti katangensis Talbot, 1928
- Charaxes catachrous van Someren & Jackson, 1952
- Charaxes etheocles carpenteri van Someren & Jackson, 1957
- Charaxes margaretae Rydon, 1980
- Charaxes cedreatis Hewitson, 1874
- Charaxes chintechi van Someren, 1975
- Charaxes manica Trimen, 1894
- Charaxes howarthi Minig, 1976
- Charaxes fulgurata Aurivillius, 1899
- Charaxes phaeus Hewitson, 1877
- Charaxes fionae Henning, 1977
- Charaxes variata van Someren, 1969 (endemic)
- Charaxes diversiforma van Someren & Jackson, 1957
- Charaxes williami Henning, 2002 (endemic)
- Charaxes aubyni australis van Someren & Jackson, 1957
- Charaxes gallagheri van Son, 1962
- Charaxes guderiana (Dewitz, 1879)
- Charaxes zoolina (Westwood, [1850])
- Charaxes nichetes pantherinus Rousseau-Decelle, 1934

==== Euxanthini ====
- Charaxes crossleyi (Ward, 1871)
- Charaxes wakefieldi (Ward, 1873)

==== Pallini ====
- Palla ussheri interposita Joicey & Talbot, 1925

=== Nymphalinae ===
- Vanessula milca latifasciata Joicey & Talbot, 1928

==== Nymphalini ====
- Antanartia schaeneia dubia Howarth, 1966
- Vanessa dimorphica (Howarth, 1966)
- Vanessa cardui (Linnaeus, 1758)
- Junonia artaxia Hewitson, 1864
- Junonia hierta cebrene Trimen, 1870
- Junonia natalica (Felder & Felder, 1860)
- Junonia oenone (Linnaeus, 1758)
- Junonia orithya madagascariensis Guenée, 1865
- Junonia sophia infracta Butler, 1888
- Junonia terea elgiva Hewitson, 1864
- Junonia touhilimasa Vuillot, 1892
- Junonia ansorgei (Rothschild, 1899)
- Junonia cymodoce lugens (Schultze, 1912)
- Protogoniomorpha anacardii nebulosa (Trimen, 1881)
- Protogoniomorpha parhassus (Drury, 1782)
- Precis actia Distant, 1880
- Precis antilope (Feisthamel, 1850)
- Precis archesia (Cramer, 1779)
- Precis ceryne (Boisduval, 1847)
- Precis cuama (Hewitson, 1864)
- Precis octavia sesamus Trimen, 1883
- Precis pelarga (Fabricius, 1775)
- Precis rauana (Grose-Smith, 1898)
- Precis sinuata Plötz, 1880
- Precis tugela pyriformis (Butler, 1896)
- Hypolimnas anthedon anthedon (Doubleday, 1845)
- Hypolimnas anthedon wahlbergi (Wallengren, 1857)
- Hypolimnas misippus (Linnaeus, 1764)
- Catacroptera cloanthe (Stoll, 1781)

=== Cyrestinae ===
==== Cyrestini ====
- Cyrestis camillus (Fabricius, 1781)

=== Biblidinae ===
==== Biblidini ====
- Byblia anvatara acheloia (Wallengren, 1857)
- Byblia ilithyia (Drury, 1773)
- Neptidopsis ophione nucleata Grünberg, 1911
- Eurytela dryope angulata Aurivillius, 1899
- Eurytela hiarbas lita Rothschild & Jordan, 1903

==== Epicaliini ====
- Sevenia amulia intermedia (Carcasson, 1961)
- Sevenia amulia benguelae (Chapman, 1872)
- Sevenia boisduvali (Wallengren, 1857)
- Sevenia consors (Rothschild & Jordan, 1903)
- Sevenia dubiosa (Strand, 1911)
- Sevenia garega (Karsch, 1892)
- Sevenia occidentalium (Mabille, 1876)
- Sevenia pechueli rhodesiana (Rothschild, 1918)
- Sevenia rosa (Hewitson, 1877)
- Sevenia trimeni (Aurivillius, 1899)
- Sevenia umbrina (Karsch, 1892)

=== Limenitinae ===
==== Limenitidini ====
- Harma theobene superna (Fox, 1968)
- Cymothoe caenis (Drury, 1773)
- Cymothoe cottrelli Rydon, 1980
- Cymothoe confusa Aurivillius, 1887
- Cymothoe herminia katshokwe Overlaet, 1940
- Cymothoe lurida azumai Carcasson, 1964
- Cymothoe sangaris luluana Overlaet, 1945
- Pseudoneptis bugandensis ianthe Hemming, 1964
- Pseudacraea boisduvalii boisduvalii (Doubleday, 1845)
- Pseudacraea boisduvalii trimenii Butler, 1874
- Pseudacraea deludens amaurina Neustetter, 1928
- Pseudacraea dolomena (Hewitson, 1865)
- Pseudacraea eurytus eurytus (Linnaeus, 1758)
- Pseudacraea eurytus conradti Oberthür, 1893
- Pseudacraea kuenowii Dewitz, 1879
- Pseudacraea lucretia expansa (Butler, 1878)
- Pseudacraea lucretia protracta (Butler, 1874)
- Pseudacraea poggei (Dewitz, 1879)
- Pseudacraea semire (Cramer, 1779)

==== Neptidini ====
- Neptis agouale Pierre-Baltus, 1978
- Neptis alta Overlaet, 1955
- Neptis aurivillii Schultze, 1913
- Neptis carcassoni Van Son, 1959
- Neptis conspicua Neave, 1904
- Neptis goochii Trimen, 1879
- Neptis gratiosa Overlaet, 1955
- Neptis incongrua Butler, 1896
- Neptis jordani Neave, 1910
- Neptis kiriakoffi Overlaet, 1955
- Neptis laeta Overlaet, 1955
- Neptis nemetes nemetes Hewitson, 1868
- Neptis nemetes margueriteae Fox, 1968
- Neptis nicoteles Hewitson, 1874
- Neptis nina Staudinger, 1896
- Neptis nysiades Hewitson, 1868
- Neptis penningtoni van Son, 1977
- Neptis puella Aurivillius, 1894
- Neptis saclava marpessa Hopffer, 1855
- Neptis serena Overlaet, 1955
- Neptis trigonophora melicertula Strand, 1912

==== Adoliadini ====
- Catuna crithea (Drury, 1773)
- Euryphura achlys (Hopffer, 1855)
- Euryphura chalcis (Felder & Felder, 1860)
- Euryphura concordia (Hopffer, 1855)
- Euryphurana nobilis viridis (Hancock, 1990)
- Hamanumida daedalus (Fabricius, 1775)
- Pseudargynnis hegemone (Godart, 1819)
- Aterica galene extensa Heron, 1909
- Euriphene incerta theodota (Hulstaert, 1924)
- Euriphene iris (Aurivillius, 1903)
- Euriphene pallidior (Hulstaert, 1924)
- Euriphene saphirina trioculata (Talbot, 1927)
- Bebearia cocalia katera (van Someren, 1939)
- Bebearia orientis (Karsch, 1895)
- Bebearia plistonax (Hewitson, 1874)
- Bebearia aurora theia Hecq, 1989
- Bebearia schoutedeni (Overlaet, 1954)
- Euphaedra medon neustetteri Niepelt, 1915
- Euphaedra zaddachii crawshayi Butler, 1895
- Euphaedra herberti katanga Hecq, 1980
- Euphaedra overlaeti Hulstaert, 1926
- Euphaedra simplex Hecq, 1978
- Euphaedra cooksoni Druce, 1905
- Euphaedra katangensis Talbot, 1927
- Euphaedra nigrobasalis Joicey & Talbot, 1921
- Euphaedra ruspina (Hewitson, 1865)
- Euphaedra harpalyce serena Talbot, 1928
- Euphaedra neophron (Hopffer, 1855)
- Euptera freyja Hancock, 1984
- Euptera hirundo lufirensis Joicey & Talbot, 1921
- Euptera pluto primitiva Hancock, 1984
- Pseudathyma callina (Grose-Smith, 1898)

=== Heliconiinae ===
==== Acraeini ====
- Acraea cerasa cerita Sharpe, 1906
- Acraea acara Hewitson, 1865
- Acraea anemosa Hewitson, 1865
- Acraea insignis Distant, 1880
- Acraea leucographa Ribbe, 1889
- Acraea machequena Grose-Smith, 1887
- Acraea neobule Doubleday, 1847
- Acraea pseudolycia pseudolycia Butler, 1874
- Acraea pseudolycia astrigera Butler, 1899
- Acraea zetes (Linnaeus, 1758)
- Acraea acrita ambigua Trimen, 1891
- Acraea asema Hewitson, 1877
- Acraea atolmis Westwood, 1881
- Acraea cepheus (Linnaeus, 1758)
- Acraea chaeribula Oberthür, 1893
- Acraea chambezi Neave, 1910
- Acraea diogenes Suffert, 1904
- Acraea egina (Cramer, 1775)
- Acraea eltringhamiana Le Doux, 1932
- Acraea guillemei Oberthür, 1893
- Acraea lofua Eltringham, 1911 (endemic)
- Acraea mansya Eltringham, 1911
- Acraea omrora umbraetae Pierre, 1988
- Acraea periphanes Oberthür, 1893
- Acraea utengulensis Thurau, 1903
- Acraea aglaonice Westwood, 1881
- Acraea atergatis Westwood, 1881
- Acraea axina Westwood, 1881
- Acraea buettneri Rogenhofer, 1890
- Acraea caldarena Hewitson, 1877
- Acraea intermediodes Ackery, 1995
- Acraea leucopyga Aurivillius, 1904
- Acraea lygus Druce, 1875
- Acraea natalica Boisduval, 1847
- Acraea oncaea Hopffer, 1855
- Acraea pudorella Aurivillius, 1899
- Acraea rhodesiana Wichgraf, 1909
- Acraea aganice nicega (Suffert, 1904)
- Acraea consanguinea intermedia (Aurivillius, 1899)
- Acraea epaea (Cramer, 1779)
- Acraea macarista (Sharpe, 1906)
- Acraea poggei Dewitz, 1879
- Acraea scalivittata (Butler, 1896)
- Acraea umbra macarioides (Aurivillius, 1893)
- Acraea acerata Hewitson, 1874
- Acraea acuta Howarth, 1969
- Acraea alciope Hewitson, 1852
- Acraea alicia (Sharpe, 1890)
- Acraea aurivillii Staudinger, 1896
- Acraea baxteri Sharpe, 1902
- Acraea bonasia (Fabricius, 1775)
- Acraea cabira Hopffer, 1855
- Acraea encedana Pierre, 1976
- Acraea encedon (Linnaeus, 1758)
- Acraea serena (Fabricius, 1775)
- Acraea esebria Hewitson, 1861
- Acraea goetzei Thurau, 1903
- Acraea jodutta (Fabricius, 1793)
- Acraea johnstoni Godman, 1885
- Acraea lycoa Godart, 1819
- Acraea burni Butler, 1896
- Acraea peneleos pelasgius Grose-Smith, 1900
- Acraea pharsalus Ward, 1871
- Acraea sotikensis Sharpe, 1892
- Acraea ventura Hewitson, 1877
- Acraea bomba Grose-Smith, 1889
- Acraea induna Trimen, 1895
- Acraea lusinga Overlaet, 1955
- Acraea mirifica Lathy, 1906
- Acraea parei orangica (Henning & Henning, 1996)
- Acraea rahira Boisduval, 1833
- Acraea speciosa Wichgraf, 1909
- Acraea cinerea Neave, 1904
- Acraea ntebiae dewitzi Carcasson, 1981
- Acraea oreas angolanus Lathy, 1906
- Acraea parrhasia servona Godart, 1819
- Acraea perenna Doubleday, 1847
- Pardopsis punctatissima (Boisduval, 1833)

==== Argynnini ====
- Issoria smaragdifera smaragdifera (Butler, 1895)
- Issoria smaragdifera reducta Carcasson, 1961
- Issoria baumanni katangae (Neave, 1910)

==== Vagrantini ====
- Lachnoptera anticlia (Hübner, 1819)
- Lachnoptera ayresii Trimen, 1879
- Phalanta eurytis (Doubleday, 1847)
- Phalanta phalantha aethiopica (Rothschild & Jordan, 1903)

== Hesperiidae ==
=== Coeliadinae ===
- Coeliades forestan (Stoll, [1782])
- Coeliades hanno (Plötz, 1879)
- Coeliades libeon (Druce, 1875)
- Coeliades pisistratus (Fabricius, 1793)
- Coeliades sejuncta (Mabille & Vuillot, 1891)

=== Pyrginae ===
==== Celaenorrhinini ====
- Loxolexis hollandi (Druce, 1909)
- Loxolexis holocausta (Mabille, 1891)
- Celaenorrhinus bettoni Butler, 1902
- Celaenorrhinus boadicea (Hewitson, 1877)
- Celaenorrhinus handmani Collins & Congdon, 1998
- Celaenorrhinus homeyeri (Plötz, 1880)
- Eretis djaelaelae (Wallengren, 1857)
- Eretis herewardi Riley, 1921
- Eretis lugens (Rogenhofer, 1891)
- Eretis melania Mabille, 1891
- Eretis umbra nox (Neave, 1910)
- Eretis vaga Evans, 1937
- Sarangesa astrigera Butler, 1894
- Sarangesa brigida sanaga Miller, 1964
- Sarangesa laelius (Mabille, 1877)
- Sarangesa lucidella (Mabille, 1891)
- Sarangesa maculata (Mabille, 1891)
- Sarangesa maxima Neave, 1910
- Sarangesa motozi (Wallengren, 1857)
- Sarangesa pandaensis deningi Evans, 1956
- Sarangesa penningtoni Evans, 1951 (endemic)
- Sarangesa phidyle (Walker, 1870)
- Sarangesa seineri Strand, 1909

==== Tagiadini ====
- Tagiades flesus (Fabricius, 1781)
- Eagris decastigma purpura Evans, 1937
- Eagris lucetia (Hewitson, 1875)
- Eagris nottoana (Wallengren, 1857)
- Eagris sabadius ochreana Lathy, 1901
- Calleagris hollandi (Butler, 1897)
- Calleagris jamesoni (Sharpe, 1890)
- Calleagris lacteus (Mabille, 1877)
- Caprona pillaana Wallengren, 1857
- Netrobalane canopus (Trimen, 1864)
- Leucochitonea levubu Wallengren, 1857
- Abantis bamptoni Collins & Larsen, 1994
- Abantis contigua Evans, 1937
- Abantis lucretia lofu Neave, 1910
- Abantis paradisea (Butler, 1870)
- Abantis tettensis Hopffer, 1855
- Abantis venosa Trimen & Bowker, 1889
- Abantis vidua Weymer, 1901
- Abantis zambesiaca (Westwood, 1874)

==== Carcharodini ====
- Spialia colotes transvaaliae (Trimen & Bowker, 1889)
- Spialia confusa Evans, 1937
- Spialia delagoae (Trimen, 1898)
- Spialia depauperata (Strand, 1911)
- Spialia diomus ferax (Wallengren, 1863)
- Spialia dromus (Plötz, 1884)
- Spialia mafa (Trimen, 1870)
- Spialia secessus (Trimen, 1891)
- Spialia spio (Linnaeus, 1764)
- Gomalia elma (Trimen, 1862)

=== Hesperiinae ===
==== Aeromachini ====
- Astictopterus abjecta (Snellen, 1872)
- Astictopterus punctulata (Butler, 1895)
- Astictopterus stellata mineni (Trimen, 1894)
- Prosopalpus debilis (Plötz, 1879)
- Prosopalpus styla Evans, 1937
- Ampittia capenas blanda Evans, 1947
- Kedestes barberae (Trimen, 1873)
- Kedestes brunneostriga (Plötz, 1884)
- Kedestes callicles (Hewitson, 1868)
- Kedestes heathi Hancock & Gardiner, 1982 (endemic)
- Kedestes lema lema Neave, 1910
- Kedestes lema linka Evans, 1956
- Kedestes malua Neave, 1910 (endemic)
- Kedestes michaeli Gardiner & Hancock, 1982
- Kedestes mohozutza (Wallengren, 1857)
- Kedestes nerva paola Plötz, 1884
- Kedestes protensa Butler, 1901
- Kedestes pinheyi Hancock & Gardiner, 1982 (endemic)
- Kedestes straeleni Evans, 1956
- Kedestes wallengrenii (Trimen, 1883)
- Gorgyra aretina (Hewitson, 1878)
- Gorgyra bibulus Riley, 1929
- Gorgyra diva Evans, 1937
- Gorgyra johnstoni (Butler, 1894)
- Gorgyra kalinzu Evans, 1949
- Gorgyra mocquerysii Holland, 1896
- Teniorhinus harona (Westwood, 1881)
- Teniorhinus herilus (Hopffer, 1855)
- Teniorhinus ignita (Mabille, 1877)
- Ceratrichia semilutea Mabille, 1891
- Ceratrichia semlikensis Joicey & Talbot, 1921
- Pardaleodes fan (Holland, 1894)
- Pardaleodes incerta (Snellen, 1872)
- Xanthodisca vibius (Hewitson, 1878)
- Acada biseriata (Mabille, 1893)
- Parosmodes morantii (Trimen, 1873)
- Paracleros biguttulus (Mabille, 1890)
- Osphantes ogowena lulua Evans, 1956
- Acleros mackenii (Trimen, 1868)
- Acleros ploetzi Mabille, 1890
- Semalea arela (Mabille, 1891)
- Semalea atrio (Mabille, 1891)
- Semalea pulvina (Plötz, 1879)
- Semalea sextilis (Plötz, 1886)
- Hypoleucis ophiusa ophir Evans, 1937
- Meza larea (Neave, 1910)
- Meza gardineri Collins & Larsen, 2008
- Paronymus nevea (Druce, 1910)
- Paronymus xanthias kiellandi Congdon & Collins, 1998
- Andronymus caesar philander (Hopffer, 1855)
- Andronymus fenestrella Bethune-Baker, 1908
- Andronymus hero Evans, 1937
- Andronymus marina Evans, 1937
- Andronymus neander (Plötz, 1884)
- Chondrolepis niveicornis (Plötz, 1883)
- Chondrolepis telisignata (Butler, 1896)
- Zophopetes cerymica (Hewitson, 1867)
- Zophopetes dysmephila (Trimen, 1868)
- Gamia shelleyi (Sharpe, 1890)
- Artitropa cama Evans, 1937
- Artitropa comus (Stoll, 1782)
- Artitropa milleri Riley, 1925
- Artitropa reducta Aurivillius, 1925
- Gretna balenge (Holland, 1891)
- Gretna carmen capra Evans, 1937
- Pteroteinon caenira (Hewitson, 1867)
- Pteroteinon concaenira Belcastro & Larsen, 1996
- Leona maracanda (Hewitson, 1876)
- Leona leonora dux Evans, 1937
- Leona halma Evans, 1937
- Caenides dacela (Hewitson, 1876)
- Monza punctata (Aurivillius, 1910)
- Fresna cojo (Karsch, 1893)
- Fresna netopha (Hewitson, 1878)
- Fresna nyassae (Hewitson, 1878)
- Platylesches affinissima Strand, 1921
- Platylesches batangae (Holland, 1894)
- Platylesches chamaeleon (Mabille, 1891)
- Platylesches galesa (Hewitson, 1877)
- Platylesches lamba Neave, 1910
- Platylesches langa Evans, 1937
- Platylesches moritili (Wallengren, 1857)
- Platylesches heathi Collins & Larsen, 2008
- Platylesches neba (Hewitson, 1877)
- Platylesches picanini (Holland, 1894)
- Platylesches robustus Neave, 1910
- Platylesches shona Evans, 1937
- Platylesches tina Evans, 1937
- Platylesches hassani Collins & Larsen, 2008

==== Baorini ====
- Brusa allardi Berger, 1967
- Brusa saxicola (Neave, 1910)
- Zenonia anax Evans, 1937
- Zenonia zeno (Trimen, 1864)
- Pelopidas mathias (Fabricius, 1798)
- Pelopidas thrax (Hübner, 1821)
- Borbo borbonica (Boisduval, 1833)
- Borbo detecta (Trimen, 1893)
- Borbo fallax (Gaede, 1916)
- Borbo fanta (Evans, 1937)
- Borbo fatuellus (Hopffer, 1855)
- Borbo gemella (Mabille, 1884)
- Borbo holtzi (Plötz, 1883)
- Borbo micans (Holland, 1896)
- Borbo perobscura (Druce, 1912)
- Borbo sirena (Evans, 1937)
- Parnara monasi (Trimen & Bowker, 1889)
- Gegenes hottentota (Latreille, 1824)
- Gegenes niso brevicornis (Plötz, 1884)
- Gegenes pumilio gambica (Mabille, 1878)

=== Heteropterinae ===
- Metisella abdeli (Krüger, 1928)
- Metisella angolana (Karsch, 1896)
- Metisella carsoni (Butler, 1898)
- Metisella formosus linda Evans, 1937
- Metisella kambove (Neave, 1910)
- Metisella midas (Butler, 1894)
- Metisella trisignatus tanga Evans, 1937
- Metisella willemi (Wallengren, 1857)
- Tsitana wallacei (Neave, 1910)
- Lepella lepeletier (Latreille, 1824)

== See also ==
- List of moths of Zambia
- Wildlife of Zambia
- Ecoregions of Zambia
