= Lepidochrysops miniata =

Scientific classification
- Kingdom: Animalia
- Phylum: Arthropoda
- Class: Insecta
- Order: Lepidoptera
- Family: Lycaenidae
- Genus: Lepidochrysops
- Species: L. miniata

Binomial name
- Lepidochrysops miniata Gardiner, 2004

Species of butterfly

Lepidochrysops miniata is a butterfly in the family Lycaenidae. It is found in Zambia. The habitat consists of miombo woodland.

== Etymology ==
The name miniata is derived from Latin, meaning red lead or vermillion (miniata). It refers to its cinnamon-brown appearance with a reddish hue.

== Description ==
The wingspan is 14.0-17.7 mm in males and 15.3-17.8 mm in females. They have been recorded on wing in September.

The wings have a cinnamon-purple color on the upperside, and cinnamon-brown color underneath on males. On females, the upperside is mauve, darkening towards the base with brown-black markings on the outer edges, while its underside is similar to the male but featuring bolder spotting.

These butterflies are a relatively medium to small species that lacks tails.

=== Male ===
The head region is white around the eyes, with distinct grey and black longitudinal lines between them, and behind the antennae. There are grey-black scales on the frons. The antennae feature incomplete white bands on a black base beneath the club and base of each segment, which grow wider on the ventral surface. The underside of the club is orange-brown, while the upperside is black, grey and white on the outer edge. Its apiculus is blunt and the tips are flat and twisted.

The labial palpi consists of 3 segments: the basal segment is dorsally black and laterally white. The following segment is predominantly black with very little white at the basal area, and the last (apical) segment is entirely black.

The thorax is black with a slight blue iridescence, and contains grey and golden-brown hairs arranged posteriorly and laterally. The underside is white.

The femora, tibiae, and tarsi grow lighter in shade in the respective order, with a mix of beige, white and brown. The femur-tibia follow size ratios of:

- Foreleg: 1.09:1
- Midleg: 1.41:1
- Hindleg: 0.90:1

The abdomen transitions from black-brown to creamy-white ventrally on its dorsal region. A few bluish scales are present dorsally on the abdomen and thorax.

The males show strong resemblance to L. cupreus (Quickelberge,1979), though they lack the underside pattern seen in the L. peculiaris group.

==== Forewing ====
The dorsal surface if the forewings features a purple sheen on a cinnamon base, and blackish tones near the base. The end of the cell and veins are darker with a dark marginal region, and the cilia darken proximally. The ventral surface lightens towards the inner margin, with a golden-brown mark at the end of the cell.

Some specimens feature post-discal spots, which are variable in number and often absent. When present, these spots seem to be darker and surrounded by a paler halo. There are two lines running down the wings: a dark submarginal line that runs down and is interrupted at the veins, getting dislodged towards the base; and a paler line interrupted at the wings, down its termen. The margin is golden-brown with bronze cilia and a darker central portion.

==== Hindwing ====
The hindwing is similar in coloration to the forewing and is tailless. A faint black spot with a slight orange inner ring is located near the margin. There is a light mark at the end of the cell, sometimes surrounded by orange scales. The coastal area and termen are darker, gradually lightening towards the base. The fringe along the edge is beige distally, transitioning to brownish-black proximally.

There is an arc of spots on discal region, the visibility and presence of which varies among species. These are black spots are outlined with white rings on the inner and outer margins, except two which contain white rings on the outer margin only. These spots appear isolated and are located closer to the base of the wings. A scaled, longitudinal-striped border marks the discocellular area.

In some specimens, three subbasal black spots with pale scales are present. There are also two submarginal lines, interrupted at the veins. However, these lines are not consistent among specimens and may be replaced by black spots, lined with orange and bluish scales. A pale line runs along the termen.

=== Genitalia ===
The uncus is bilobed, laterally fused to tegumen. There are long and curved subunci, that gradually thin towards the apex, which is hooked. The lower fultura consists of two small arms fused to the base of the valves. These valves are long and bow-shaped, narrowing and recurving to form a pointed shape towards the distal third. There is long, fine cilia upon the valves and uncus.

The aedaegus is cylindrical, thick and largens towards apical end. Sheathing it is the anellus, which is broad and also fused to the aedaegus. Distally, the aedaegus has a smooth appearance due to presence of short, lateral pieces.

=== Female ===
The coloration and markings of the head region and thorax in females, is similar to the males. However, the thorax features more light blue scales as compared.

The femora are beige above and laterally, while the tibiae and tarsi are black-beige on the outer lateral edge. All legs are white on the underside (with some black scales on the tarsi) The femur-tibia follow size ratios of:

- Foreleg: 1.3:1
- Midleg: 1.6:1
- Hindleg: 1.1:1

The abdomen is grey-brown above, becoming creamy to white below. The base of each segment is light in color, containing some purple and light blue scales on the dorsal surface.

==== Forewing ====
The upper side is mauve in color, darkening towards base, and extending towards the inner-marginal area. The costal, marginal, and submarginal areas are brown-black. A dark, bold spot is visible at the end of the cell. The cilia shift from grey to dark brown proximally.

The ventral surface also resembles that of the males, though the postdiscal spots are more often present and visible, along with a broader marginal line. The fringe is greyish brown on the underside, lightening distally, sometimes displaying a checkered patern with white near the base.

==== Hindwing ====
The hindwing is tailless, with mauve base to submarinal areas. Coloration varies among specimens, as in some, the mauve color extends into the submarginal regions forming a band interrupted by veins, and the intensity of blue is also variable. A faint mark is present at the end of the cell and a black spot is near the end of the wing near the margin. Sometimes few orange scales are present on the inner edge of the spot. The costal area and termen are dark brown, and lower basal areas are lighter. The cilia are colored beige outwards and black inwards.

The underside is similar to that of males, but with more prominent markings, including a partially black discal spot in some butterflies. The black spots on the underside are larger, especially the ones near the base of the wing. There is also an inner whitish submarginal line that extends to the discal area in some specimens. The cilia near the basal angle are proximally white.

== Habitat and behavior ==
The males show territorial behavior and have a swift flight speed. While engaging in aerial disputes, they resemble Axiocerses and Aloeides species. L. miniata females have a slower flight speed compared to males. The males reside on short grass stems and similar vegetation

Oviposition takes place near Ocimum plants. Adults feed from the flowers of Ocimum L. lamiaceae species.

The larvae feed on Ocimum homblei, which is also noted as the plant where the eggs are present.
