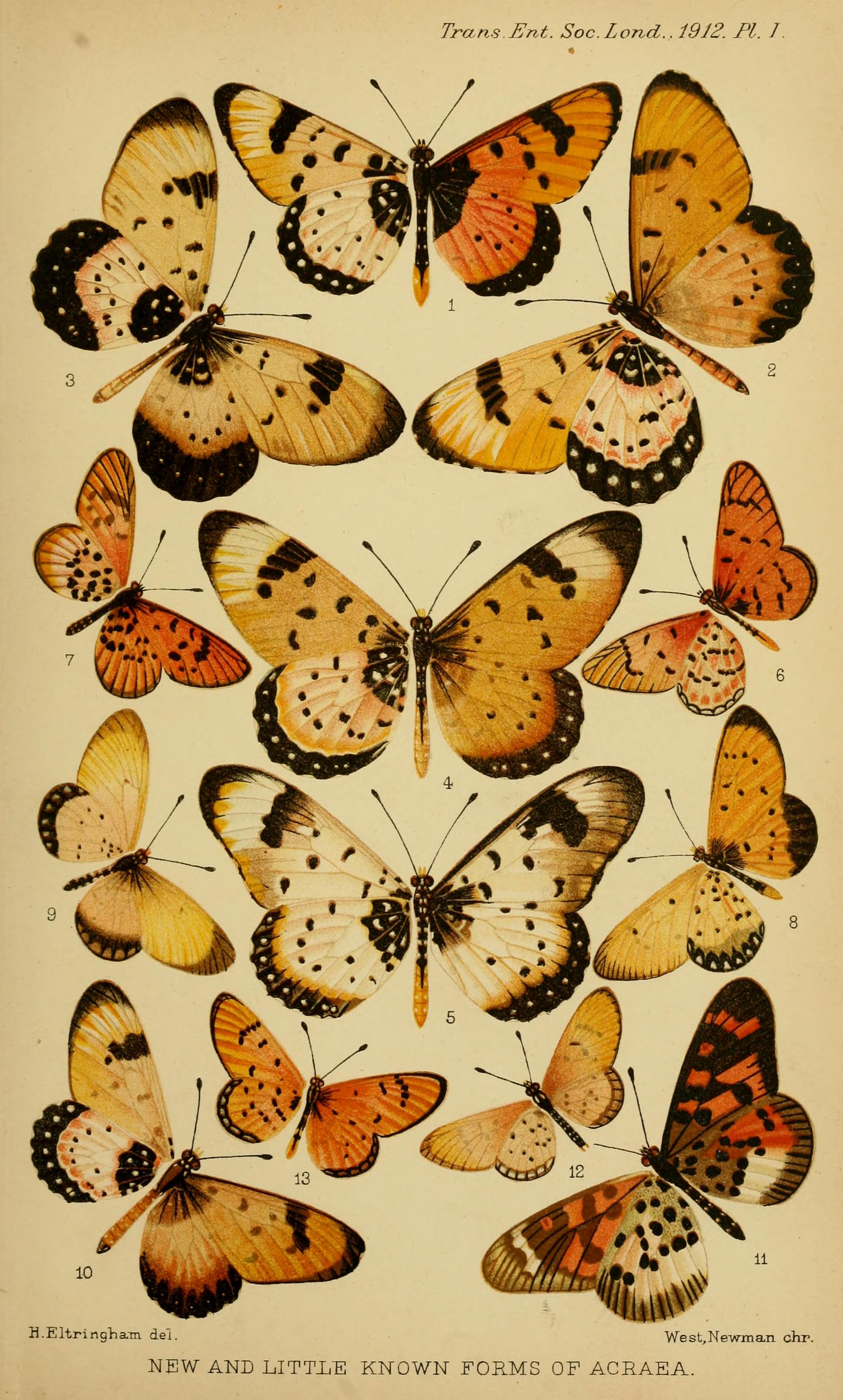
- Figures 11 and 12

Scientific classification
- Kingdom: Animalia
- Phylum: Arthropoda
- Class: Insecta
- Order: Lepidoptera
- Family: Nymphalidae
- Genus: Acraea
- Species: A. mansya

Binomial name
- Acraea mansya Eltringham, 1911

Synonyms
- Acraea (Acraea) mansya; Acraea mansya janssensi Overlaet, 1955

= Acraea mansya =

Species of butterfly

Acraea mansya is a butterfly in the family Nymphalidae. It is found in Zambia and the Democratic Republic of the Congo (Haut-Lomani).

== Description ==
A. mansya Eltr. (60 a) has an expanse of 40 to 50 mm.. and differs from the two following nearly allied species [ Acraea nohara and Acraea chambezi ] only in not having the veins of the forewing edged with black at the distal margin and in the discal dot in cellule 3 of the hindwing being placed almost midway between the marginal band and the cell. The female is lighter than the male. Rhodesia.

== Taxonomy ==
It is a member of the Acraea cepheus species group. See also Pierre & Bernaud, 2014.
