= Zenonia (butterfly) =

Scientific classification
- Kingdom: Animalia
- Phylum: Arthropoda
- Class: Insecta
- Order: Lepidoptera
- Family: Hesperiidae
- Tribe: Baorini
- Genus: Zenonia; Evans, 1935

Genus of butterflies

Zenonia is a genus of skipper butterflies in the family Hesperiidae.

It is native to Africa.

== Species ==
- Zenonia anax Evans, 1937
- Zenonia crasta Evans, 1937
- Zenonia zeno (Trimen, 1864)
