= Lepidochrysops yvonnae =

Scientific classification
- Kingdom: Animalia
- Phylum: Arthropoda
- Class: Insecta
- Order: Lepidoptera
- Family: Lycaenidae
- Genus: Lepidochrysops
- Species: L. yvonnae

Binomial name
- Lepidochrysops yvonnae Gardiner, 2004

Species of butterfly

Lepidochrysops yvonnae is a butterfly in the family Lycaenidae. It is found in Zambia. The habitat consists of open marshland in wooded grassland.

== Etymology ==
The species is named in recognition of lepidopterist Wendy Yvonne Gardiner.

== Description ==
The wingspan is 14.1 - 19.5mm in males and 19.5 -19.97mm in females. Adults are on wing from September to early October.

This species is close in color and size to Lepidochrysops chala (D' Abrera 1980). It differs on the basis of having a grey underside (dusted with light scales, giving a gritty appearance) unlike that of in L. chala, which is brown. Furthermore, the markings are a lot more boldly defined in L. yvonnae than in L.chala.

== Habitat and behavior ==
Adults are found flying around in open vlei and slightly wooded grassland. The males are territorial and have a rapid speed of flight. The only stop to circle within small territories and chasing off other males they encounter. The females also show rapid flight speed and are often seen around Ocimum flowers.

Adults feed from the flowers of Ocimum species. They have been recorded on wing in September and early October.

== Appearance ==
=== Male ===
The antennae-wing length ratio is approximately 0.42. The head region is primarily white, containing two indistinct longitudinal rows of fine black hairs situated between the eyes. The frons area is covered by light beige-brown scales. The antennae are mostly black, having narrow white bands at the base of each segment, with white markings being broader on the ventral side. They terminate in a flat, twisted club with a blunt apiculus (tip). Its labial palpi is basally white in the first segment, with blackish accents near the apex, or the dorsal region. In contrast to which, the third segment is black with a white line on the undeside.

The thorax is dorsally black with blue scales and a layer of light blue and white hairs, which slowly transitions to white at the ventral surface with scattered grey scales near the base. The legs are predominantly white, with the femora, tibia, and tarsi marked by black and dark-brown scales. These grow lighter in shade towards the ends. The femur-tibia follow size ratios of:

- Foreleg: 1.19:1
- Midleg: 1.4:1
- Hindleg: 0.95:1

The abdomen is mostly light grey with a scattering of blue scales dorsally, and the underside presenting a much lighter, whitish shade.

The forewing exhibits a soft mauve color, marked with thin black margins and a small, dark spot at the end of the cell. There are dual-toned cilia with the parts near base being dark grey-black, transitioning lighter outwards. The underside is light and dusted with pale scales, upon which are elongate discal and post-discal spots. These spots are darker than the base color and are encircled in a white halo. In some regions they are slightly dislodged and bordered by faint pale lines running along the lateral margins. A single submarinal line runs down, interrupted at veins. It is centered between two white sagittate-shaped lines. Another faint line goes down the termen of the wing.

The hindwing is tailless, similar in color to the forewing. At the margin of space 2, a black spot is distinctly visible near the basal and discal region, bordered by blue scales on the outer, and golden scales on the inner edge. This color remains constant from space 1b to the lower half of space 7, after which it converts to grey-brown. The space before 1a is greyish blue. The edges are black, having cilia that are lighter towards the inside. On the underside, a row of eight rounded spots is present at discal region, similar to base color. These spots are also encircled white, with the ones in spaces 2 and 6 dislodged towards the base. The discal cell is closed by a longitudina; discocellular mark edged in white. Additional spots are present at the subbasal region on the underside, each outlined with white. Wing termen is dark brown, bordered by a white marginal line.

The male genitalia consist of a complex structure. The uncus is bi-lobed, with each one of them being laterally fused with the tegumen. The subunci are elongated, curved, and narrow gradually towards its hook-shaped apex. The lower fultura is equipped with two arms, which are combined securely to the base of its valves, providing structural stability. These claspers are quite broad, widening even more towards its apex. The rounded ends give them a spatulate appearance. Both the valvae and lobes of uncus are lined with fine, long setae which offer sensory and mechanical roles. The aedaegus is elongated and cylindrical, sheathed by a pointed anellus that ismerged into its structure for added protection.The distal and laterla pieces extend strikingly, having their ends sharply bended inwards wgen observed from a lateral view.

=== Female ===
The forewing length of the female measures 19.5 -19.97 mm, with an antenna to wing ratio of 0.4:1. The head, thorax, legs and abdomen exhibit similar features to those of the male. The femur-tibia ratios are as follows:

- Foreleg: 1.31:1
- Hindleg: 0.96:1

The middle leg is absent due to the slight morphological difference between the sexes.

The forewing displays mauve-blue coloration on the upper surface, accompanied by a large dark spot at the end of the cell. This color is bordered by dark brown-black regions along the costal, marginal and submarginal areas. The mauve only extends to the basal half of the inner margin and ends at the subapical area. Dark postdiscal spots may be present, but they vary in size and amount. The cilia is characterised as being dark towards the centre or the body, lightening into light grey as it goes farther away. In contrary to male, the underside of the forewing is darker, although the overall appearance remains the same. Similarly, the cilia on the underside are also brown at the distal, and light grey on the proximal ends.

The hindwing is tailless, also having a purple-blue hue from spaces 1b to 5, set against a grey-black background. This purple/ mauve color is more pronounced in the basal and discal areas, in a soft gradient effect. Two white submarginal lines run along spaces 1–6 (occasionally containing purple scales), interrupted at the veins having a V-shaped pattern. A black lunulate (crescent-shaped)spot appears at the end of space 2, bordered proximally by orange, and distally by white. The upper half of the discal cell is marked with a faint, subtle mark. A white marginal line stretches form spaces 1–6, becoming increasingly faint towards reaching space 6. The termen is black, while the cilia are grey towards the centre and lighten to greyish-white when it gets farther from it, with a darker (almost black) band forming between the two ciliary bands. While the underside of the wing of the female resembles that of the male, the lunulate spot at the end of space 2 is larger in female. The cilia feature three distinct bands: the most proximal band, bordering the termen, is brown; the medial band is brown-black, which may become paler towards the inner edge: and he outermost band is greyish-cream, all together contributing to a layered, textured appearance.
