= Brusa (butterfly) =

Scientific classification
- Kingdom: Animalia
- Phylum: Arthropoda
- Class: Insecta
- Order: Lepidoptera
- Family: Hesperiidae
- Subfamily: Hesperiinae
- Tribe: Baorini
- Genus: Brusa; Evans, 1937

Genus of butterflies

Brusa is a genus of skippers in the family Hesperiidae.

== Species ==
- Brusa allardi Berger, 1967
- Brusa saxicola Neave, 1910
