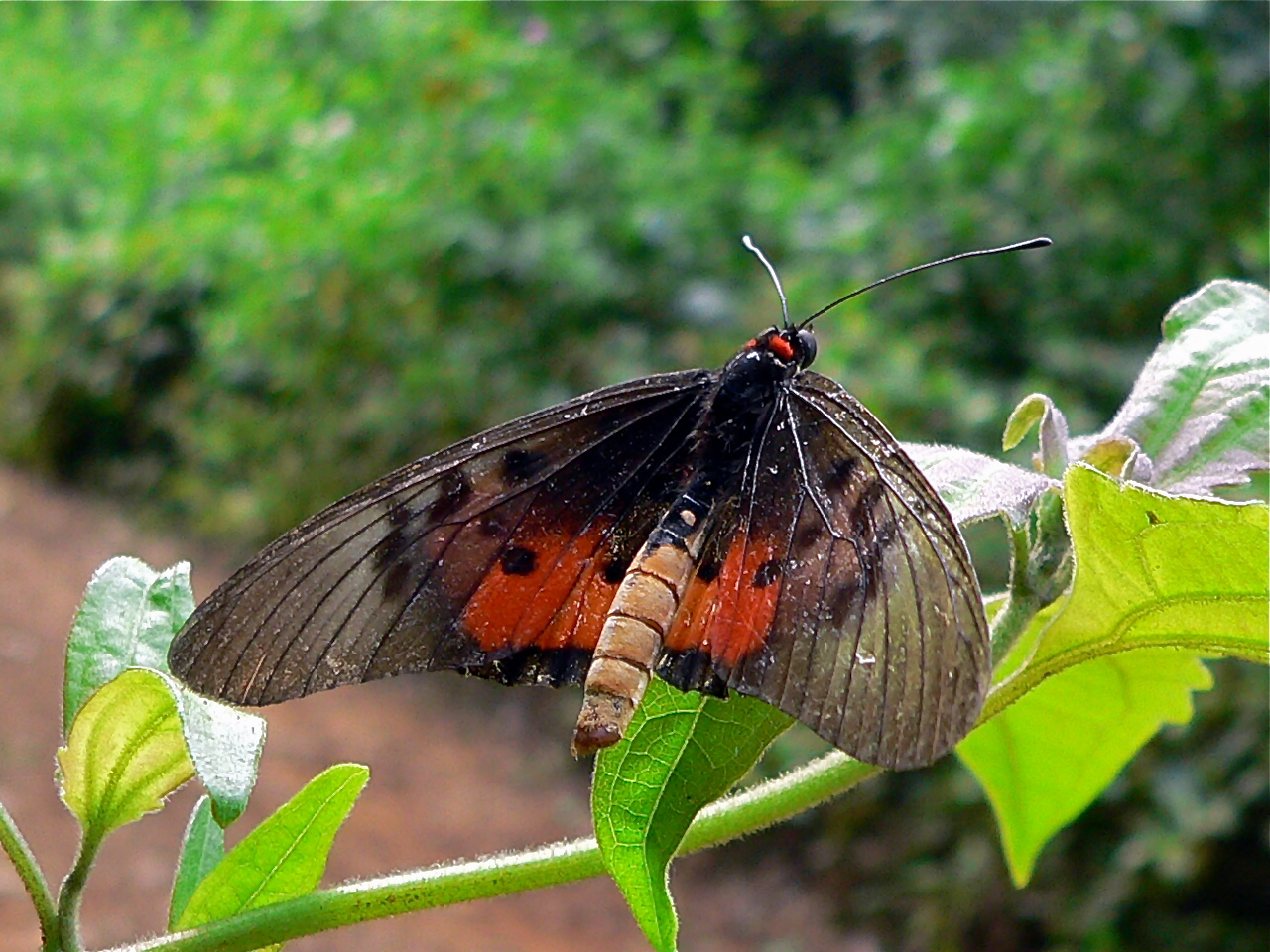
- Acraea abdera eginopsis

Scientific classification
- Kingdom: Animalia
- Phylum: Arthropoda
- Clade: Pancrustacea
- Class: Insecta
- Order: Lepidoptera
- Family: Nymphalidae
- Genus: Acraea
- Species: A. abdera

Binomial name
- Acraea abdera Hewitson, 1852

Synonyms
- Acraea (Acraea) abdera; Acraea cepheus var. eginopsis Aurivillius, 1899; Acraea cepheus f. nigrescens Eltringham, 1912

= Acraea abdera =

Species of butterfly

Acraea abdera, the Abdera acraea, is a butterfly in the family Nymphalidae. It is found in Sierra Leone, Liberia, Ivory Coast, Ghana, Togo, Nigeria, Cameroon, Equatorial Guinea, Sudan, Uganda and the Republic of the Congo .

== Description ==
Very close to Acraea cepheus qv.

== Subspecies ==
- Acraea abdera abdera (eastern Nigeria, Cameroon, Bioko, Sudan, Uganda)
- Acraea abdera eginopsis Aurivillius, 1899 (Sierra Leone, Liberia, Ivory Coast, Ghana, Togo, western Nigeria)

Torben Larsen developed a species numbering system for his 2005 publication Butterflies of West Africa. The subspecies eginopsis is #1174. The 'Larsen' numbers have since been used with permission in A Sharp Eye on Butterflies of Ghana.

== Biology ==
The habitat consists of forest edges.

Both sexes mud-puddle in hot, dry weather.

The larvae feed on Caloncoba gilgiana, Caloncoba glauca and Oncoba spinosa.

== Taxonomy ==
It is a member of the Acraea cepheus species group. See also Pierre & Bernaud, 2014.
