= Acraea ntebiae =

Scientific classification
- Kingdom: Animalia
- Phylum: Arthropoda
- Class: Insecta
- Order: Lepidoptera
- Family: Nymphalidae
- Genus: Acraea
- Species: A. ntebiae

Binomial name
- Acraea ntebiae Sharpe, 1897

Synonyms
- Acraea (Actinote) ntebiae; Acraea melanostricta Sharpe, 1904; Acraea mairessei Aurivillius, 1904; Acraea mairessei ab. dewitzi Aurivillius, 1904

Species of butterfly

Acraea ntebiae is a butterfly in the family Nymphalidae. It is found in the Democratic Republic of the Congo, Uganda, Tanzania and Zambia.

== Description ==
A. mairessei Auriv. Wings above fully scaled, black with 6 semitransparent white spots on the forewing (in 1 b, 2, 4-6 and in the apex of the cell) and a sulphur-yellow median band on the hindwing, formed as in melanoxantha Beneath the ground-colour of the hindwing and 8 or 9 elongate marginal spots on the forewing are bright sulphur-yellow; the veins of both wings very broadly edged with black at the distal margin; the streaks on the interneural folds are very short and thick, more like spots, and do not nearly reach the distal margin; cell of the hindwing only with one black dot. Congo and Uganda. - f. dewitzi Auriv. only differs in having the median band on the upperside of the hindwing red-yellow and the white spots in 1 b and the cell of the fore wing smaller. Congo region: Kassai.

== Subspecies ==
- Acraea ntebiae ntebiae (central and northern Democratic Republic of the Congo, Uganda, north-western Tanzania)
- Acraea ntebiae dewitzi Carcasson, 1981 (Democratic Republic of the Congo: south-east to Shaba, Zambia)
- Acraea ntebiae kigoma Kielland, 1978 (Tanzania: Mount Mahale)

== Biology ==
The habitat consists of forests.

Adults feed from flowers on trees and shrubs.

== Taxonomy ==
It is a member of the Acraea circeis species group - but see also Pierre & Bernaud, 2014
