= Zenonia crasta =

Scientific classification
- Kingdom: Animalia
- Phylum: Arthropoda
- Class: Insecta
- Order: Lepidoptera
- Family: Hesperiidae
- Genus: Zenonia
- Species: Z. crasta

Binomial name
- Zenonia crasta Evans, 1937

Species of butterfly

Zenonia crasta is a butterfly in the family Hesperiidae. It is found in the eastern part of the Democratic Republic of the Congo, south-western Uganda, Rwanda and Burundi.
