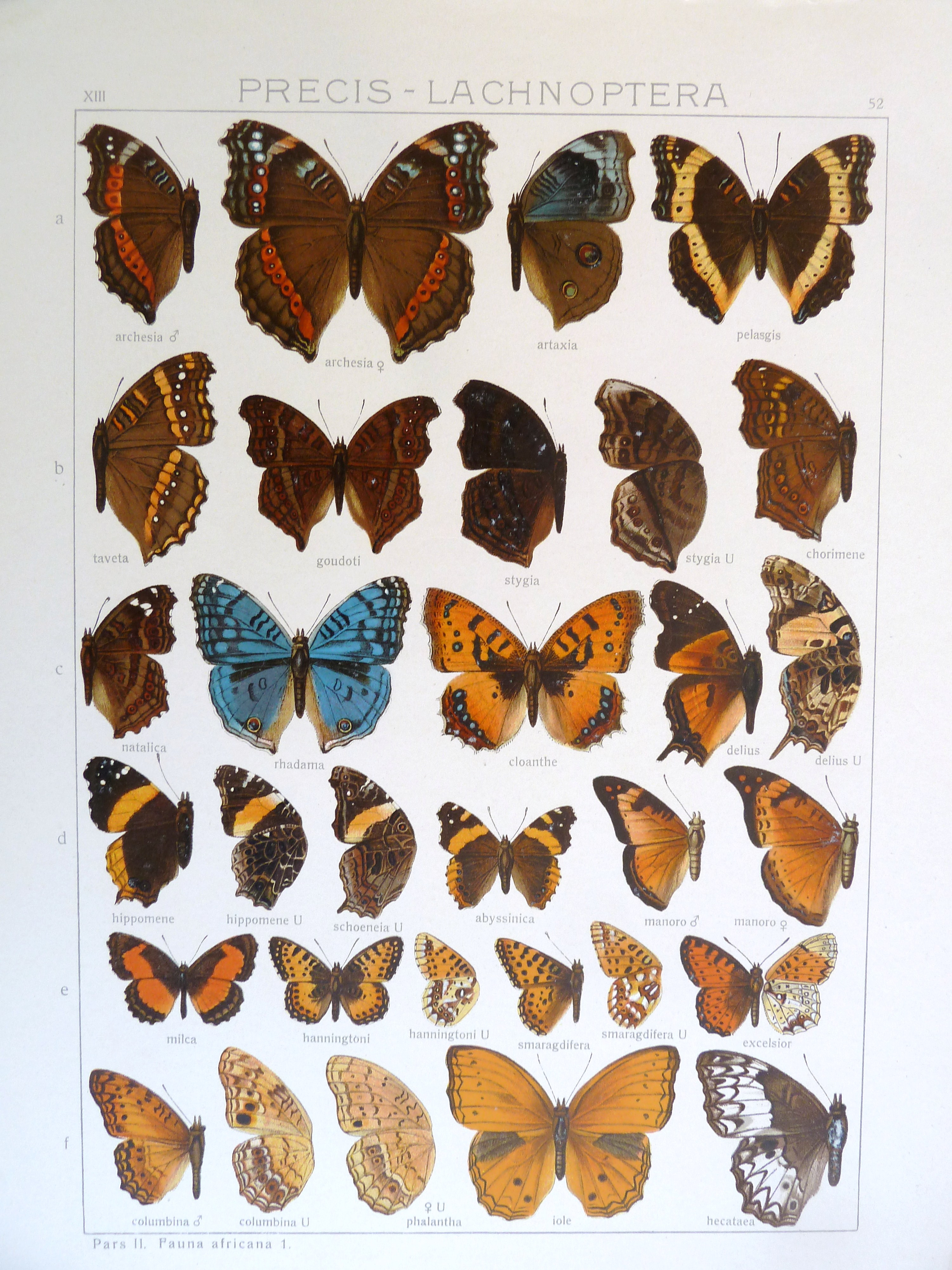
- In Adalbert Seitz's Fauna Africana

Scientific classification
- Kingdom: Animalia
- Phylum: Arthropoda
- Class: Insecta
- Order: Lepidoptera
- Family: Nymphalidae
- Genus: Issoria
- Species: I. smaragdifera

Binomial name
- Issoria smaragdifera (Butler, 1895)

Synonyms
- Argynnis smaragdifera Butler, 1895

= Issoria smaragdifera =

Species of butterfly

Issoria smaragdifera, the African queen fritillary, is a butterfly in the family Nymphalidae. It is found in Tanzania, Malawi, Zambia and Zimbabwe. The habitat consists of montane grassland on the edges of montane forests.

Adults are on wing year round.

The larvae feed on Viola abyssinica.

== Subspecies ==
- Issoria smaragdifera smaragdifera (highlands of Malawi, eastern Zambia, eastern Zimbabwe)
- Issoria smaragdifera reducta Carcasson, 1961 (southern highlands of Tanzania and possibly Zambia)
