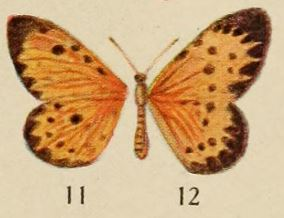

Scientific classification
- Kingdom: Animalia
- Phylum: Arthropoda
- Clade: Pancrustacea
- Class: Insecta
- Order: Lepidoptera
- Family: Lycaenidae
- Genus: Pentila
- Species: P. pauli

Binomial name
- Pentila pauli Staudinger, 1888

Synonyms
- Pentila radiata Lathy, 1903; Pentila multipunctata Lathy, 1903; Pentila nyassana alberta Hulstaert, 1924; Pentila nyassana benguellana Stempffer and Bennett, 1961; Pentila clarensis Neave, 1903; Pentila nyassana elisabetha Hulstaert, 1924; Pentila nyassana elisabetha ab. nigribasis Hulstaert, 1924; Pentila leopardina Schultze, 1923; Pentila multiplagata Bethune-Baker, 1908; Pentila amenaida var. nyassana Aurivillius, 1899; Pentila amenaida daina Suffert, 1904; Pentila amenaida f. amenaidana Strand, 1911; Pentila nyassana obsoleta Hawker-Smith, 1933; Pentila nyassana obsoleta var. cataractae Stevenson, 1940; Pentila nyassana ras Talbot, 1935

= Pentila pauli =

Species of butterfly

Pentila pauli, the Paul's buff, Paul's pentila or spotted pentila, is a butterfly in the family Lycaenidae. It is found in Senegal, Guinea, Sierra Leone, Liberia, Ivory Coast, Ghana, Togo, Benin, Nigeria, Cameroon, Gabon, the Republic of the Congo, the Central African Republic, Sudan, the Democratic Republic of the Congo, Angola, Uganda, Ethiopia, Kenya, Tanzania, Zambia, Malawi and Zimbabwe. The habitat consists of deciduous woodland and forest margins.

The larvae feed on very dark, blue-green (black) algae (cyanobacteria) growing on tree trunks.

== Subspecies ==
- P. p. pauli (Sierra Leone, Liberia, Ivory Coast, Ghana, Togo, Benin, Nigeria, western Cameroon)
- P. p. abri Collins & Larsen, 2001 (south-eastern Senegal, western Guinea)
- P. p. alberta Hulstaert, 1924 (western Tanzania, Democratic Republic of the Congo: Tanganika)
- P. p. benguellana Stempffer & Bennett, 1961 (Angola: Benguella and Bihe districts)
- P. p. clarensis Neave, 1903 (Uganda, western Kenya, Tanzania)
- P. p. dama (Suffert, 1904) (southern coast of Tanzania)
- P. p. elisabetha Hulstaert, 1924 (northern and western Zambia, Democratic Republic of the Congo: Shaba, Sankuru, Kasai and Maniema)
- P. p. leopardina Schultze, 1923 (southern Cameroon, Gabon, Congo, Central African Republic, Democratic Republic of the Congo: Cataractes, Kinshasa, Equateur, Tshuapa and Mongala)
- P. p. multiplagata Bethune-Baker, 1908 (southern Sudan, Democratic Republic of the Congo: Uele, Ituri, Tshopo and North Kivu)
- P. p. nyassana Aurivillius, 1899 (Tanzania, Malawi, Zambia: east of the Luangwa Valley)
- P. p. obsoleta Hawker-Smith, 1933 (Zimbabwe: Lomagundi district to the southern bank of the Zambezi River and the Victoria Falls, as well as Dichwe, Zambia)
- P. p. ras Talbot, 1935 (south-western Ethiopia)

Torben Larsen developed a species numbering system for his 2005 publication Butterflies of West Africa. The nominate subspecies is #142. The 'Larsen' numbers have since been used with permission in A Sharp Eye on Butterflies of Ghana.
