= Brusa allardi =

Scientific classification
- Kingdom: Animalia
- Phylum: Arthropoda
- Class: Insecta
- Order: Lepidoptera
- Family: Hesperiidae
- Genus: Brusa
- Species: B. allardi

Binomial name
- Brusa allardi Berger, 1967

Species of butterfly

Brusa allardi is a butterfly in the family Hesperiidae. It is found in Angola, the Democratic Republic of the Congo (the north-east and Shaba), Burundi and northern Zambia.
