= Graphium deliae =

Scientific classification
- Kingdom: Animalia
- Phylum: Arthropoda
- Clade: Pancrustacea
- Class: Insecta
- Order: Lepidoptera
- Family: Papilionidae
- Genus: Graphium
- Species: G. deliae

Binomial name
- Graphium deliae Libert & Collins, 2007

Synonyms
- Graphium (Arisbe) deliae

Species of butterfly

Graphium deliae is a butterfly in the family Papilionidae. It is found in Zambia.
