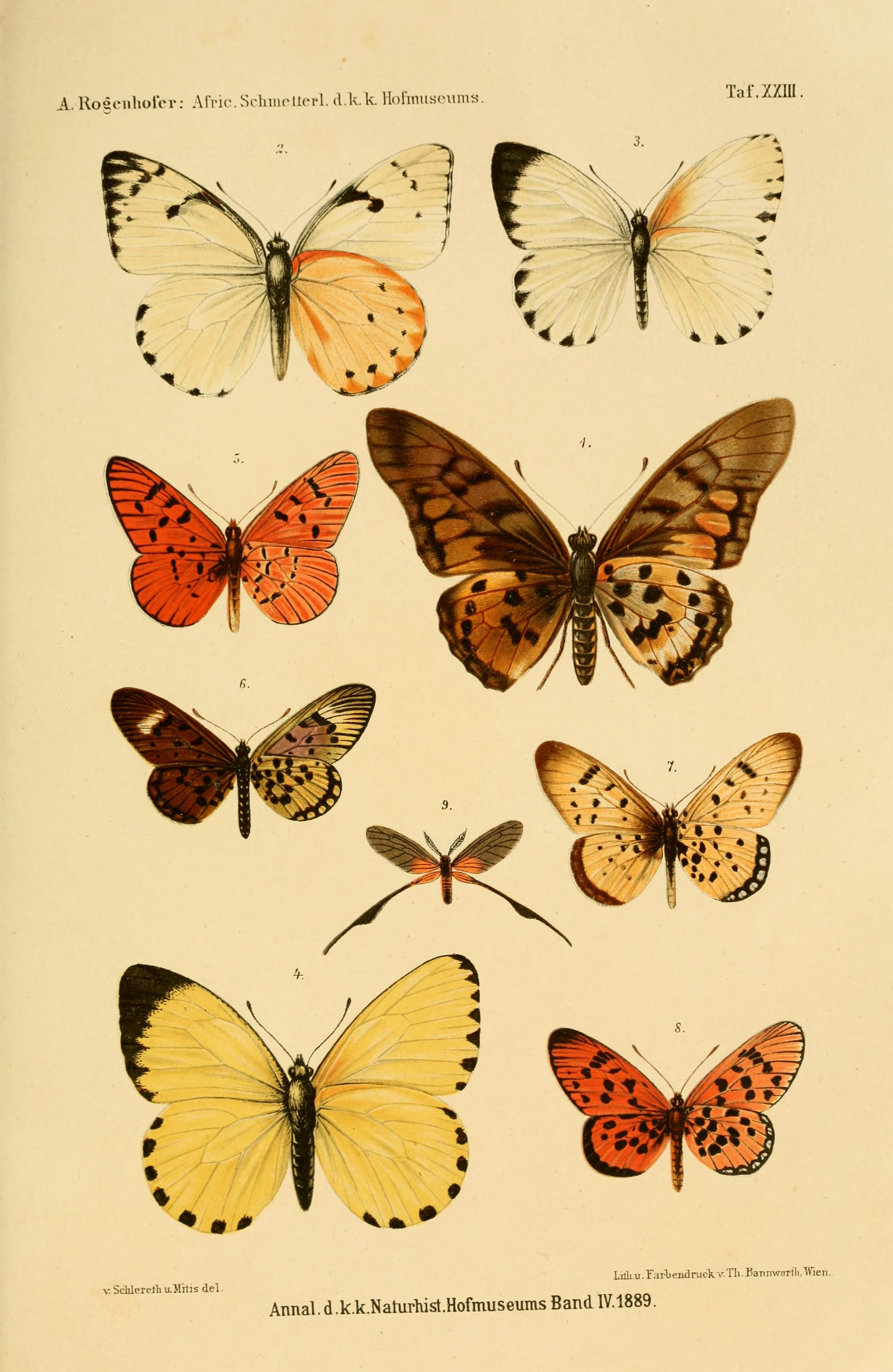
- Figure 2

Scientific classification
- Kingdom: Animalia
- Phylum: Arthropoda
- Class: Insecta
- Order: Lepidoptera
- Family: Pieridae
- Genus: Belenois
- Species: B. welwitschii

Binomial name
- Belenois welwitschii Rogenhofer, 1890

Synonyms
- Pieris hospitis Weymer, 1903; Pieris dentigera ratidengi Suffert, 1904; Pieris welwitschi ab. conjunctiata Strand, 1911; Pieris welwitschi ab. muenzneri Strand, 1911; Pieris subeida f. sylvander ab. lutea Rebel, 1914; Pieris subeida f. sylvander ab. unilutea Rebel, 1914; Pieris subeida f. sylvander ab. infumata Rebel, 1914; Pieris calypso welwitschi ab. pauper Hulstaert, 1924; Belenois calypso welwitschi f. albivena Talbot, 1943; Belenois calypso welwitschi f. citrinescens Talbot, 1943; Belenois calypso f. aglaia Stoneham, 1957

= Belenois welwitschii =

Species of butterfly

Belenois welwitschii is a butterfly in the family Pieridae. It is found in Angola, the Democratic Republic of the Congo, Zambia, Malawi and Tanzania. The habitat consists of forests.

The larvae feed on Maerua and Cadaba species.

== Subspecies ==
- Belenois welwitschii welwitschii (north-eastern Angola, Democratic Republic of the Congo, Zambia, Malawi)
- Belenois welwitschii shaba Berger, 1981 (Democratic Republic of the Congo, western Tanzania, Zambia)
