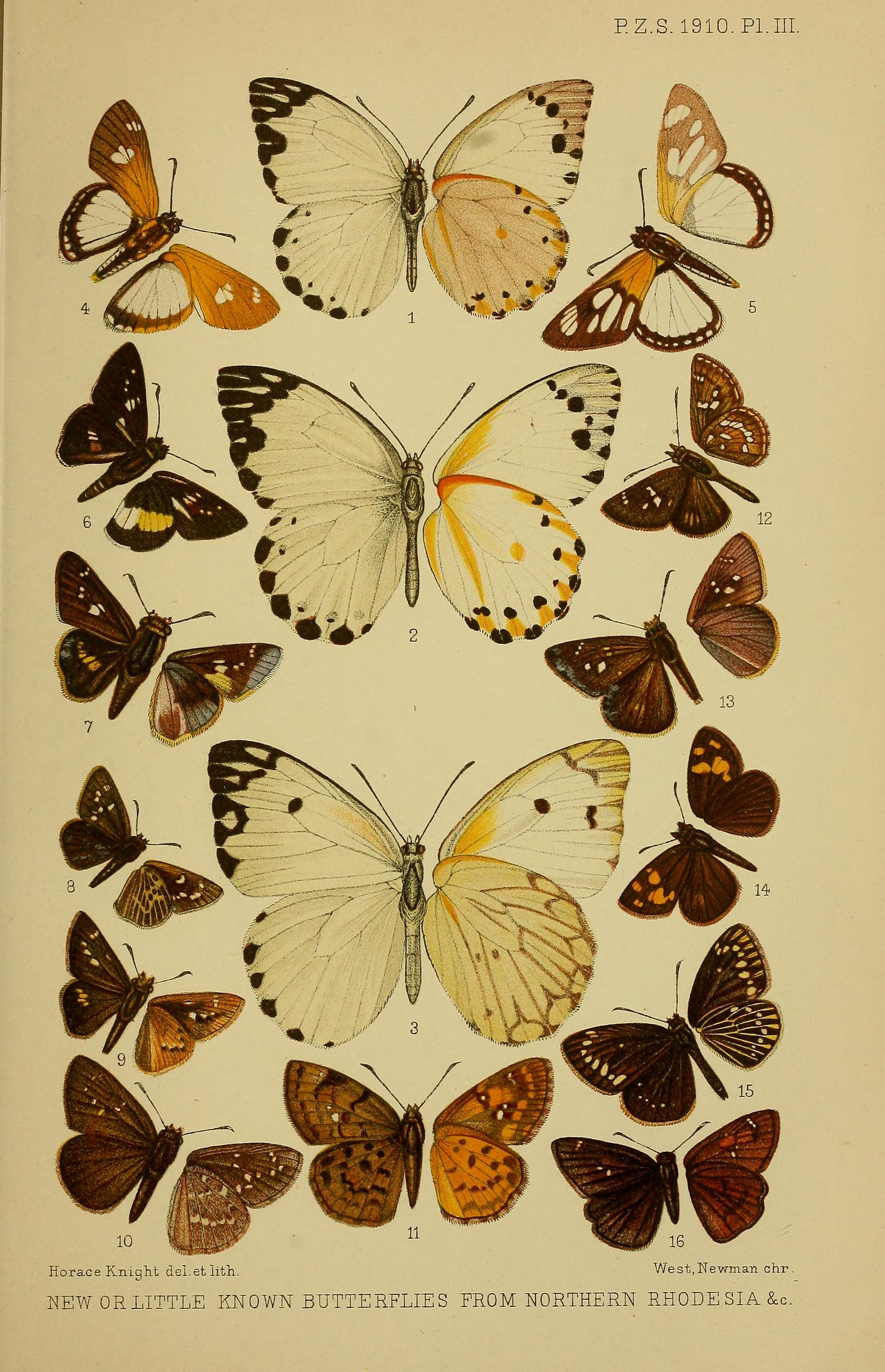
- Kedestes lema figure 8

Scientific classification
- Domain: Eukaryota
- Kingdom: Animalia
- Phylum: Arthropoda
- Class: Insecta
- Order: Lepidoptera
- Family: Hesperiidae
- Genus: Kedestes
- Species: K. lema

Binomial name
- Kedestes lema Neave, 1910

= Kedestes lema =

Species of butterfly

Kedestes lema, the Lema ranger, is a butterfly in the family Hesperiidae. It is found in Angola, the Democratic Republic of the Congo, Malawi, Zambia and Zimbabwe. The habitat consists of Brachystegia woodland.

Adults are on wing from December to April.

== Subspecies ==
- Kedestes lema lema (Angola, Democratic Republic of the Congo: Shaba, Zambia)
- Kedestes lema linka Evans, 1956 (Malawi, Zambia, eastern Zimbabwe)
