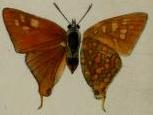

Scientific classification
- Domain: Eukaryota
- Kingdom: Animalia
- Phylum: Arthropoda
- Class: Insecta
- Order: Lepidoptera
- Family: Lycaenidae
- Genus: Aphnaeus
- Species: A. erikssoni

Binomial name
- Aphnaeus erikssoni Trimen, 1891

Synonyms
- Aphnaeus bruneeli Berger, 1951

= Aphnaeus erikssoni =

Eriksson's highflier

Species of butterfly

Aphnaeus erikssoni, the Eriksson's highflier, is a butterfly in the family Lycaenidae. It is found in Angola, Namibia, Zambia, the Democratic Republic of the Congo, Tanzania, Malawi, Mozambique and Zimbabwe. The habitat consists of savanna and open woodland.

Adults of subspecies A. e. barnesi have been recorded feeding from the flowers of Brachystegia trees and sucking from damp spots.

The larvae feed on Julbernardia globiflora and Burkea africana. They are associated with ants of the genus Crematogaster.

== Subspecies ==
- A. e. erikssoni (southern Angola, Namibia: Caprivi, north-western Zambia, Democratic Republic of the Congo: south-east to Lualaba)
- A. e. barnesi Stempffer, 1954 (eastern Zimbabwe)
- A. e. kiellandi Stempffer, 1972 (Tanzania: south-west to the Mpanda and Kigoma districts)
- A. e. mashunae Stempffer, 1954 (Zimbabwe: Harare area)
- A. e. rex Aurivillius, 1909 (Malawi, south-eastern Tanzania, north-eastern Zambia, Mozambique)
