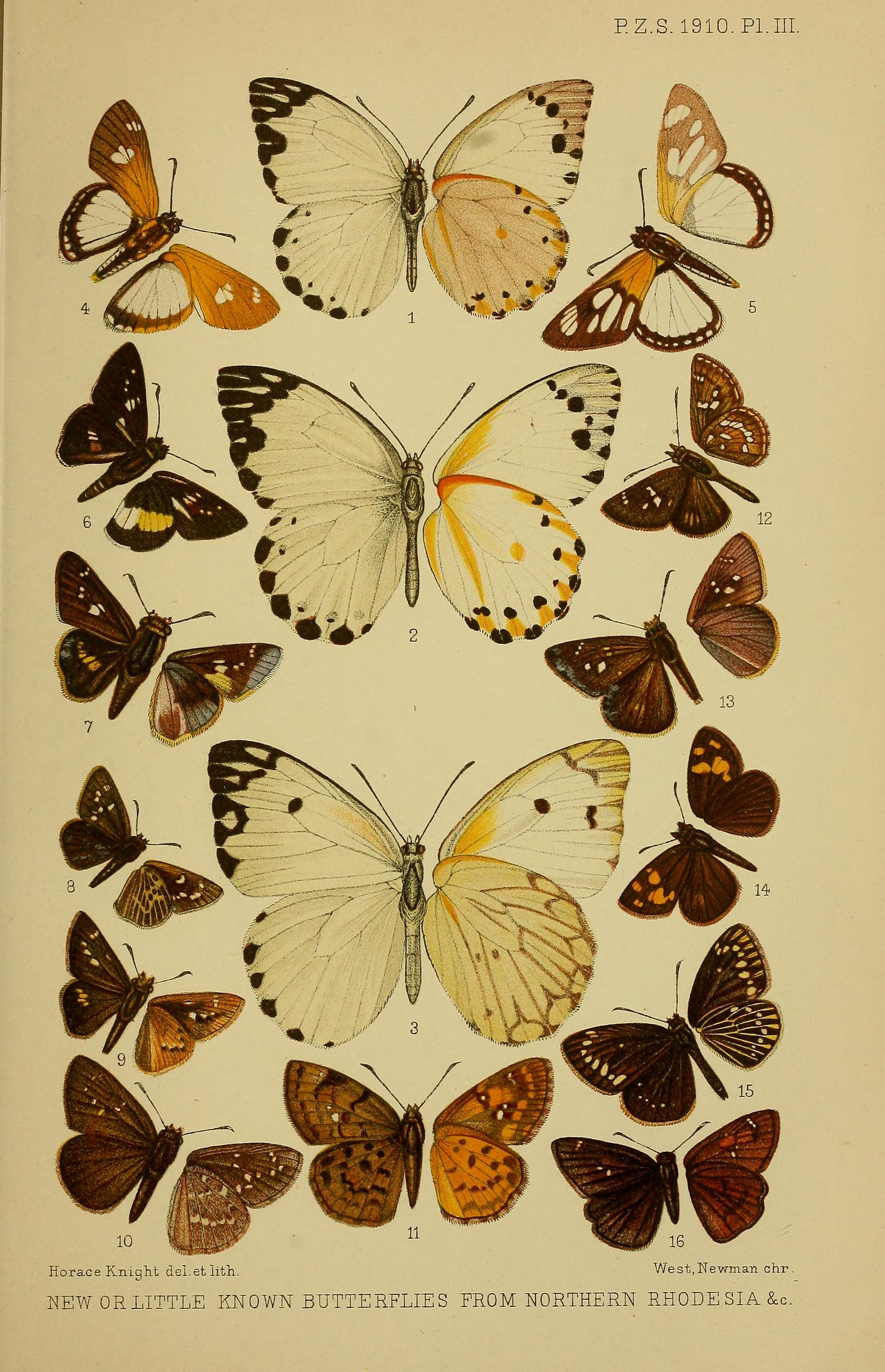
- Figure 10

Scientific classification
- Kingdom: Animalia
- Phylum: Arthropoda
- Class: Insecta
- Order: Lepidoptera
- Family: Hesperiidae
- Genus: Brusa
- Species: B. saxicola

Binomial name
- Brusa saxicola (Neave, 1910)

Synonyms
- Parnara saxicola Neave, 1910

= Brusa saxicola =

Species of butterfly

Brusa saxicola is a butterfly in the family Hesperiidae. It is found in the Democratic Republic of the Congo (the south-west and Shaba), northern Zambia and western Tanzania.
