= Axiocerses melanica =

Scientific classification
- Domain: Eukaryota
- Kingdom: Animalia
- Phylum: Arthropoda
- Class: Insecta
- Order: Lepidoptera
- Family: Lycaenidae
- Genus: Axiocerses
- Species: A. melanica

Binomial name
- Axiocerses melanica Henning & Henning, 1996

Species of butterfly

Axiocerses melanica is a butterfly in the family Lycaenidae. It is found in Zambia. The habitat consists of moist woodland.

Adults have been recorded in October, November, February, March and April.

== Subspecies ==
- Axiocerses melanica melanica (central Zambia)
- Axiocerses melanica aurata Henning & Henning, 1996 (north-western Zambia)
