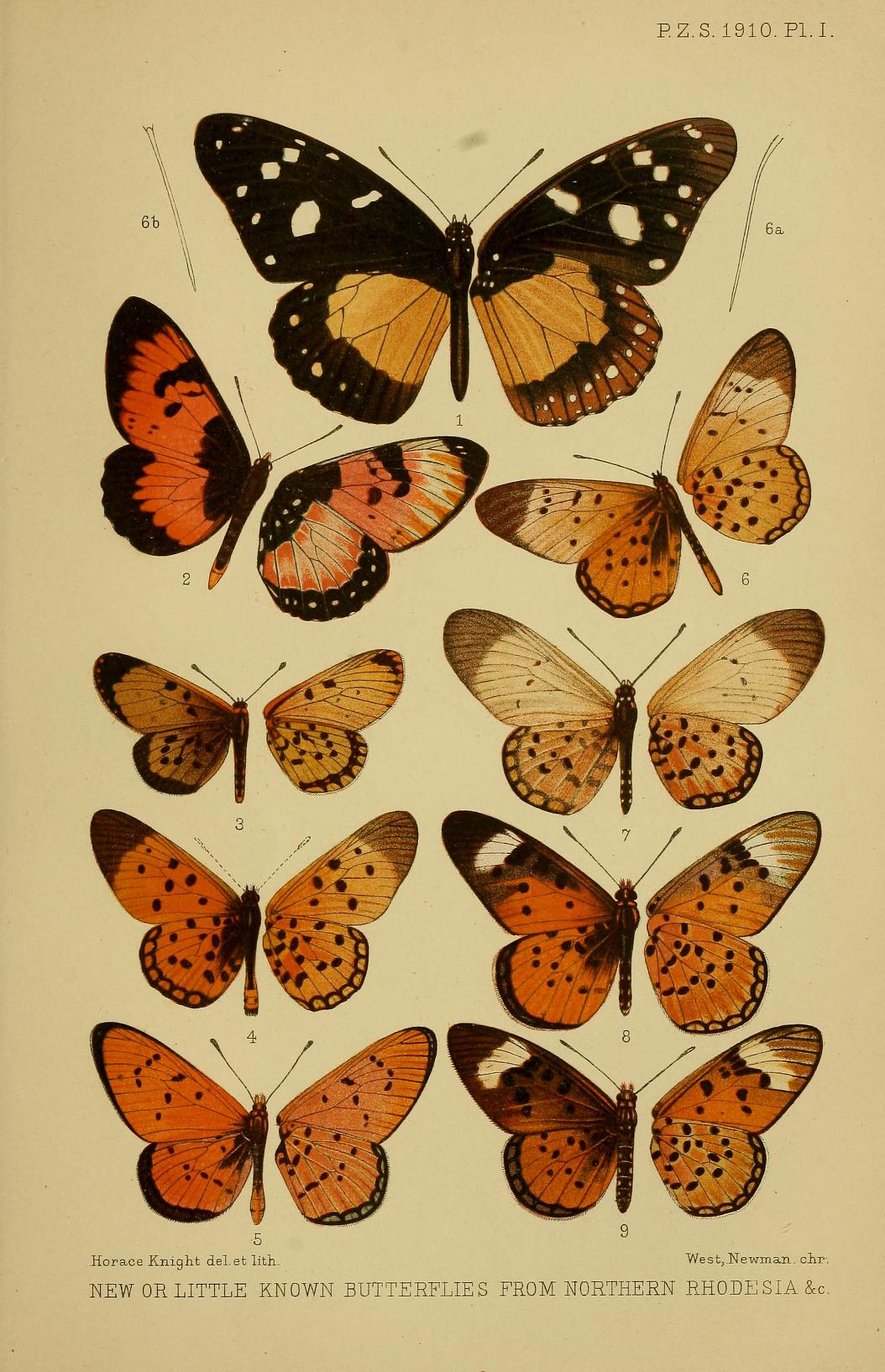
- Figure 5

Scientific classification
- Kingdom: Animalia
- Phylum: Arthropoda
- Class: Insecta
- Order: Lepidoptera
- Family: Nymphalidae
- Genus: Acraea
- Species: A. chambezi

Binomial name
- Acraea chambezi Neave, 1910

Synonyms
- Acraea nohara chambezi Neave, 1910; Acraea (Acraea) chambezi

= Acraea chambezi =

Species of butterfly

Acraea chambezi is a butterfly in the family Nymphalidae. It is found in eastern Zambia and Malawi.

== Description ==
A. chambezi Neave is very similar to A. nohara (55 c), only differing in having the veins of the forewing above very finely black at the distal margin; the discal dot in 4 of the forewing is not placed in the same line as the dots in cellules 5 and 6 and the discal dot in 5 of the hindwing is absent; the discal dot in cellule 3 of the hindwing is placed near the base of the cellule; forewing usually with basal dot in cellule 1b. North-East Rhodesia.

== Biology ==
The habitat consists of Brachystegia woodland (Miombo).

== Taxonomy ==
It is a member of the Acraea cepheus species group. See also Pierre & Bernaud, 2014.
