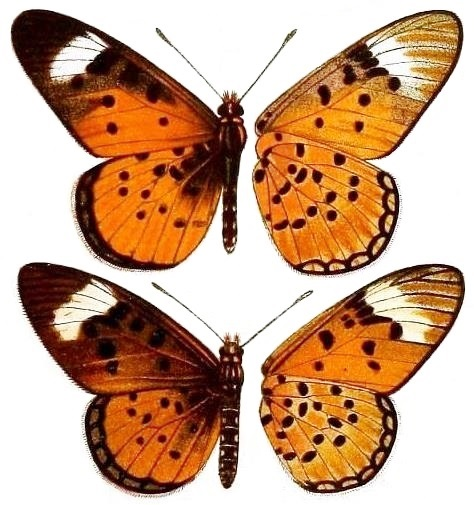
- male and female upper and undersides 1 Acraea rhodesiana male 2 female

Scientific classification
- Kingdom: Animalia
- Phylum: Arthropoda
- Class: Insecta
- Order: Lepidoptera
- Family: Nymphalidae
- Genus: Acraea
- Species: A. rhodesiana

Binomial name
- Acraea rhodesiana Wichgraf, 1909

Synonyms
- Acraea (Acraea) rhodesiana; Acraea mima Neave, 1910; Acraea rhodesiana f. flaviapicalis Overlaet, 1955

= Acraea rhodesiana =

Species of butterfly

Acraea rhodesiana is a butterfly in the family Nymphalidae. It is found in central and northern Zambia and the DRC (Haut-Lomani).

== Description ==
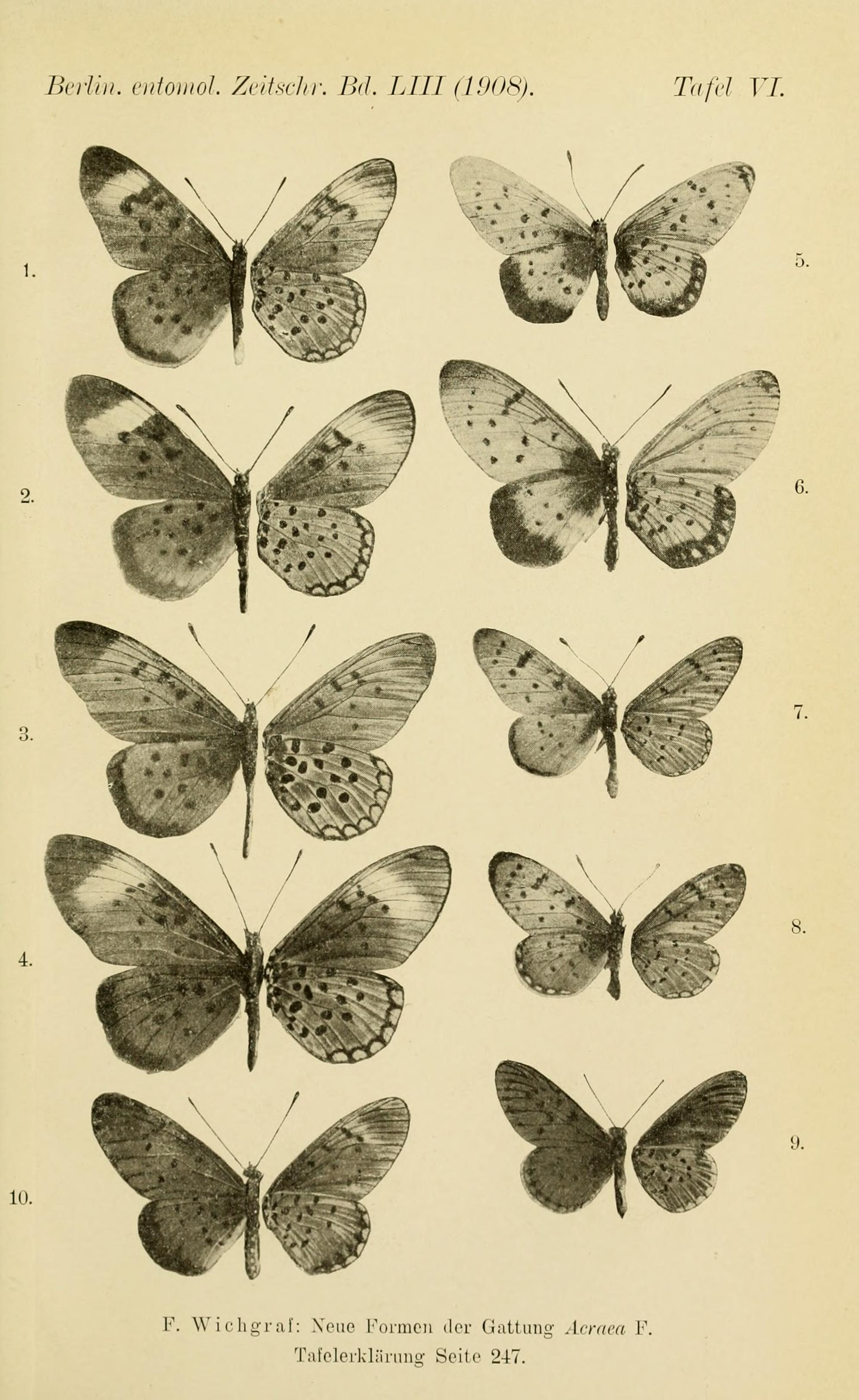
Plate accompanying the original description by Wichgraf, F., 1909 1 Acraea rhodesiana male 2 Acraea rhodesiana female

A. rhodesiana Wichgr. (55 d, as aglaonice; 60 b). Both wings above reddish orange-yellow, darkened at the base, especially on the hindwing; forewing with black apical spot 4 mm. in breadth and fine black line at the costal and distal margins, discal spots 4 to 6 large and angled, and placed immediately beyond the apex of the cell; marginal band on the upperside of the hindwing 2 mm. in breadth, black and almost unspotted; wings beneath with light yellow ground-colour; the hindwing spotted with reddish at the base or throughout, marginal spots large and whitish. The fore wing in the female with white subapical band, which in the male is absent or only indicated by light yellow colour. Rhodesia.

A. mima Neave is very similar to rhodesiana [now synonym], but is easily distinguished by the fore wing in both sexes having a white subapical band in cellules 3 to 6 and especially by the apical half or in the female the greater part of the forewing above being blackish; on the under surface of the forewing the apical half is suffused with dark grey; otherwise agrees with rhodesiana and may well be merely a form of this. Southern Congo: Katanga; Rhodesia.

== Biology ==
The habitat consists of deciduous woodland.

The larvae feed on Basananthe reticulata.

== Taxonomy ==
It is a member of the Acraea caecilia species group. See also Pierre & Bernaud, 2014.
