= Zenonia anax =

Scientific classification
- Kingdom: Animalia
- Phylum: Arthropoda
- Class: Insecta
- Order: Lepidoptera
- Family: Hesperiidae
- Genus: Zenonia
- Species: Z. anax

Binomial name
- Zenonia anax Evans, 1937

Species of butterfly

Zenonia anax is a butterfly in the family Hesperiidae. It is found in the Democratic Republic of the Congo (Shaba), south-western Tanzania, Malawi and central and northern Zambia.
