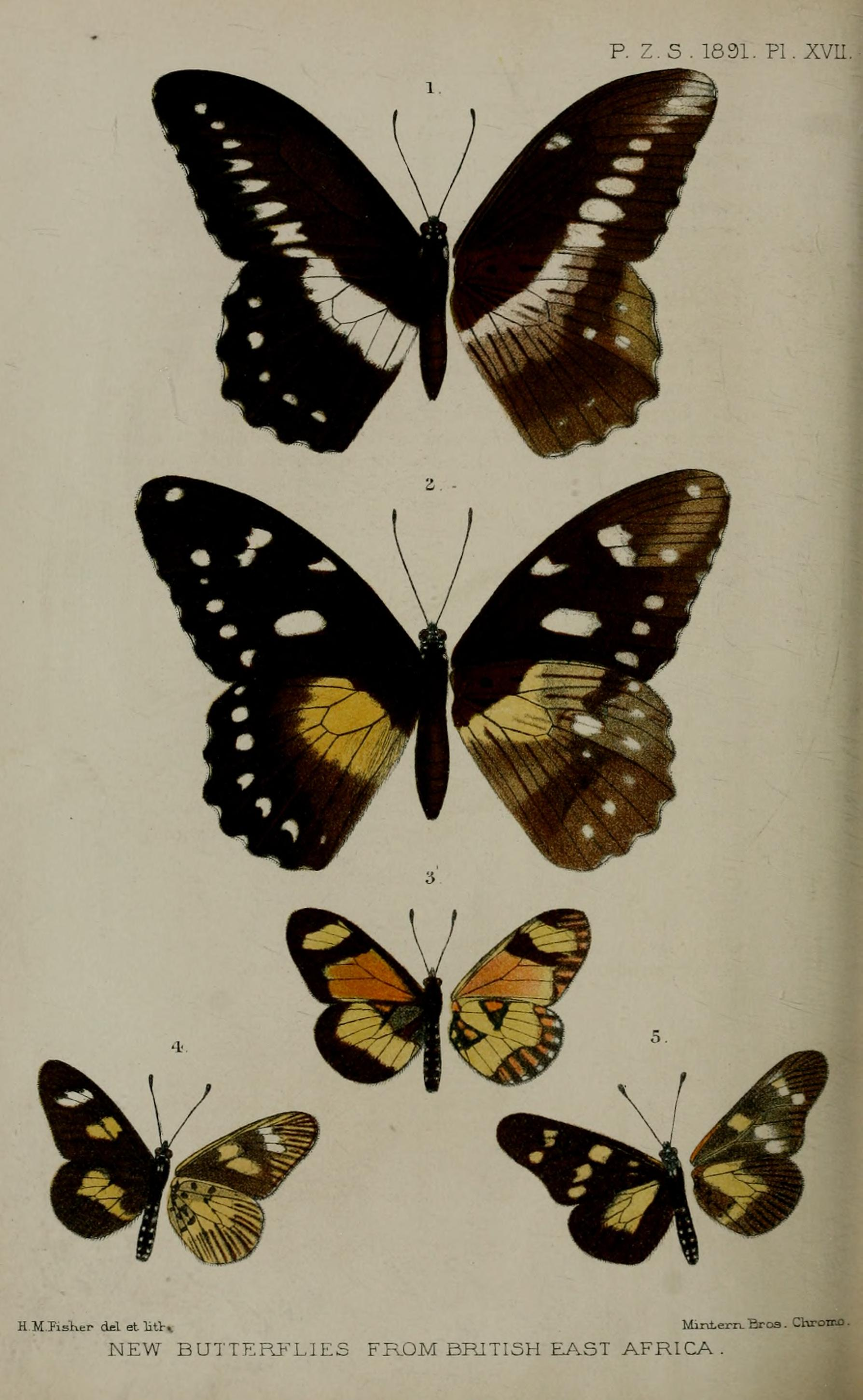
- Figure 4

Scientific classification
- Kingdom: Animalia
- Phylum: Arthropoda
- Class: Insecta
- Order: Lepidoptera
- Family: Nymphalidae
- Genus: Acraea
- Species: A. melanoxantha

Binomial name
- Acraea melanoxantha Sharpe, 1891

Synonyms
- Acraea (Actinote) melanoxantha

= Acraea melanoxantha =

Species of butterfly

Acraea melanoxantha is a butterfly in the family Nymphalidae. It is found in Uganda and western Kenya.

== Description ==
A. melanoxantha E. Sharpe. Both wings above black, thickly scaled; the forewing with two yellow spots in the middle (in 2 and the apex of the cell) and 3 semi-transparent whitish subapical spots in 4-6; hindwing above with narrow lemon-yellow median band, which is only 3 mm. in breadth in the middle and becomes gradually narrower towards the inner margin. Beneath the hindwing and the apex of the forewing are light yellow with black veins and streaks at the distal margin; the latter are finely pointed distally and scarcely reach the margin; cell of the hindwing only with one black dot. Elgon Mountain.

== Taxonomy ==
It is a member of the Acraea circeis species group - but see also Pierre & Bernaud, 2014
