= Zenonia zeno =

- in Tanzania

Scientific classification
- Kingdom: Animalia
- Phylum: Arthropoda
- Clade: Pancrustacea
- Class: Insecta
- Order: Lepidoptera
- Family: Hesperiidae
- Genus: Zenonia
- Species: Z. zeno

Binomial name
- Zenonia zeno (Trimen, 1864)

Synonyms
- Pamphila zeno Trimen, 1864; Pamphila splendens Mabille, 1877; Hesperia coanza Plötz, 1883; Padraona watsoni Butler, 1894; Padraona zeno var. zenides Strand, 1918

Species of butterfly

Zenonia zeno, the orange-spotted skipper, orange-spotted bellboy or common bellboy, is a butterfly of the family Hesperiidae. It is found from KwaZulu-Natal, Transvaal, Zimbabwe and Mozambique to eastern Africa and to Nigeria. The habitat consists of forests and coastal bush.

Larvae feed on various grasses, but also on Gramineae species, including cultivated maize and sorghums.
