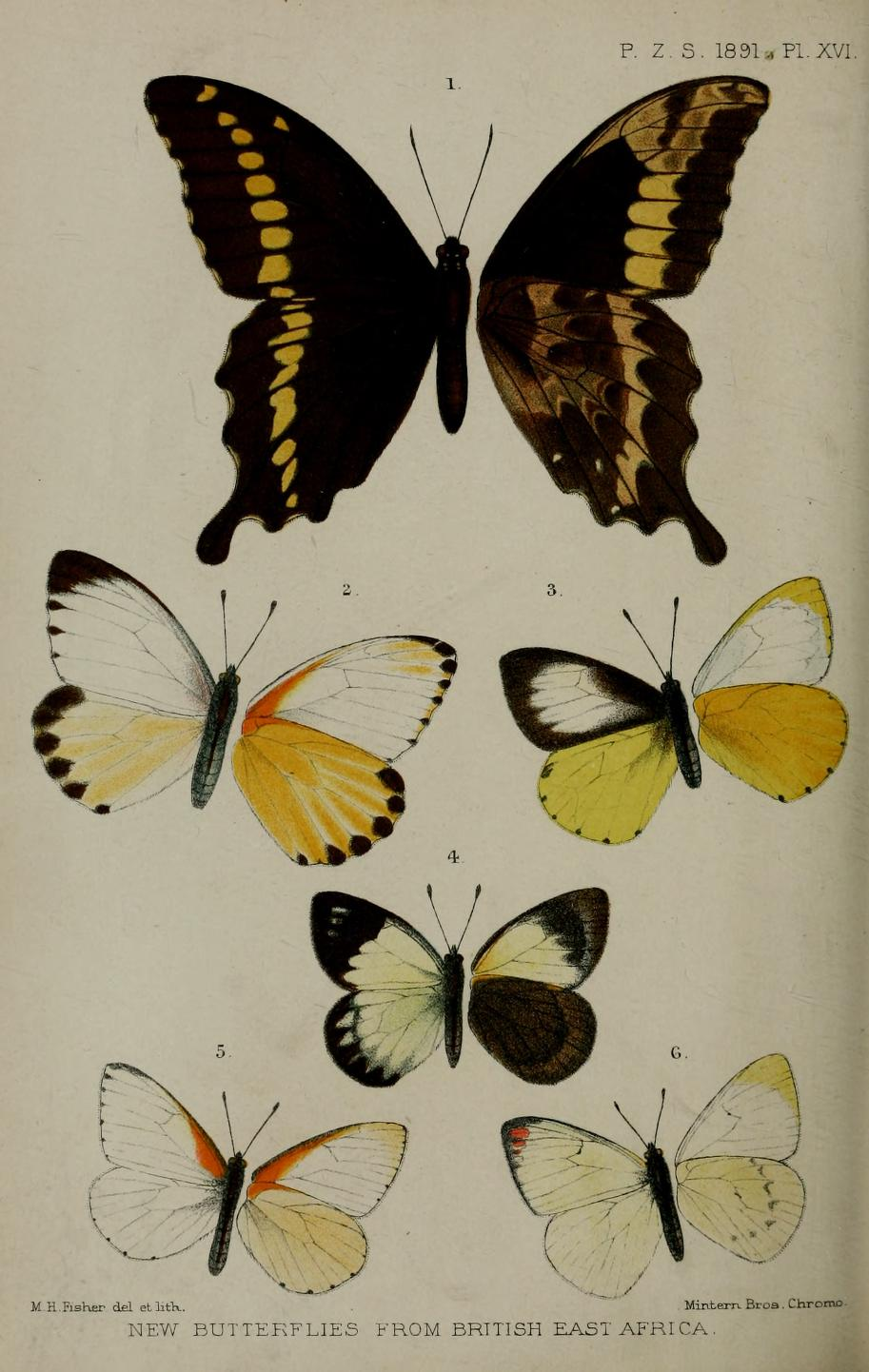
- Plate accompanying Sharpe's 1891 description in Proceedings of the Zoological Society

Scientific classification
- Kingdom: Animalia
- Phylum: Arthropoda
- Clade: Pancrustacea
- Class: Insecta
- Order: Lepidoptera
- Family: Papilionidae
- Genus: Papilio
- Species: P. mackinnoni

Binomial name
- Papilio mackinnoni Sharpe, 1891

Synonyms
- Papilio mackinnoni immaculatus Suffert, 1904; Papilio mackinnoni bimaculatus Suffert, 1904; Papilio mackinnoni f.indiv. unimaculatus Le Cerf, 1924; Papilio mackinnnoni var. elgonia Bryk, 1926; Papilio mackinnoni ab. ampliusmaculata Krüger, 1928; Papilio mackinnoni mackinnoni f. addenda Dufrane, 1953

= Papilio mackinnoni =

Species of butterfly

Papilio mackinnoni, the Mackinnon's swallowtail, is a species of swallowtail butterfly from the genus Papilio that is found in Kenya, Tanzania, Malawi, Zambia, Angola, Uganda, Zaire, South Sudan, the Republic of the Congo, Rwanda and Burundi.

The larvae feed on Rutaceae, Clausema, Toddalia, Citrus, Teclea simplicifolia, T. nobilis and T. tricocarpa.

== Subspecies ==
- Papilio mackinnoni mackinnoni (southern Sudan, Republic of the Congo, Uganda, Rwanda, Burundi, Kenya, north-eastern Tanzania)
- Papilio mackinnoni benguellae Jordan, 1908 (highlands of central Angola)
- Papilio mackinnoni theodori Riley, 1921 (southern Zaire, north-western Zambia)
- Papilio mackinnoni isokae (Hancock, 1984) (north-eastern Zambia, western Tanzania, northern Malawi)
- Papilio mackinnoni mpwapwana Kielland, 1990 (eastern Tanzania)
- Papilio mackinnoni reductofascia Kielland, 1990 (northern Tanzania, southern Kenya)

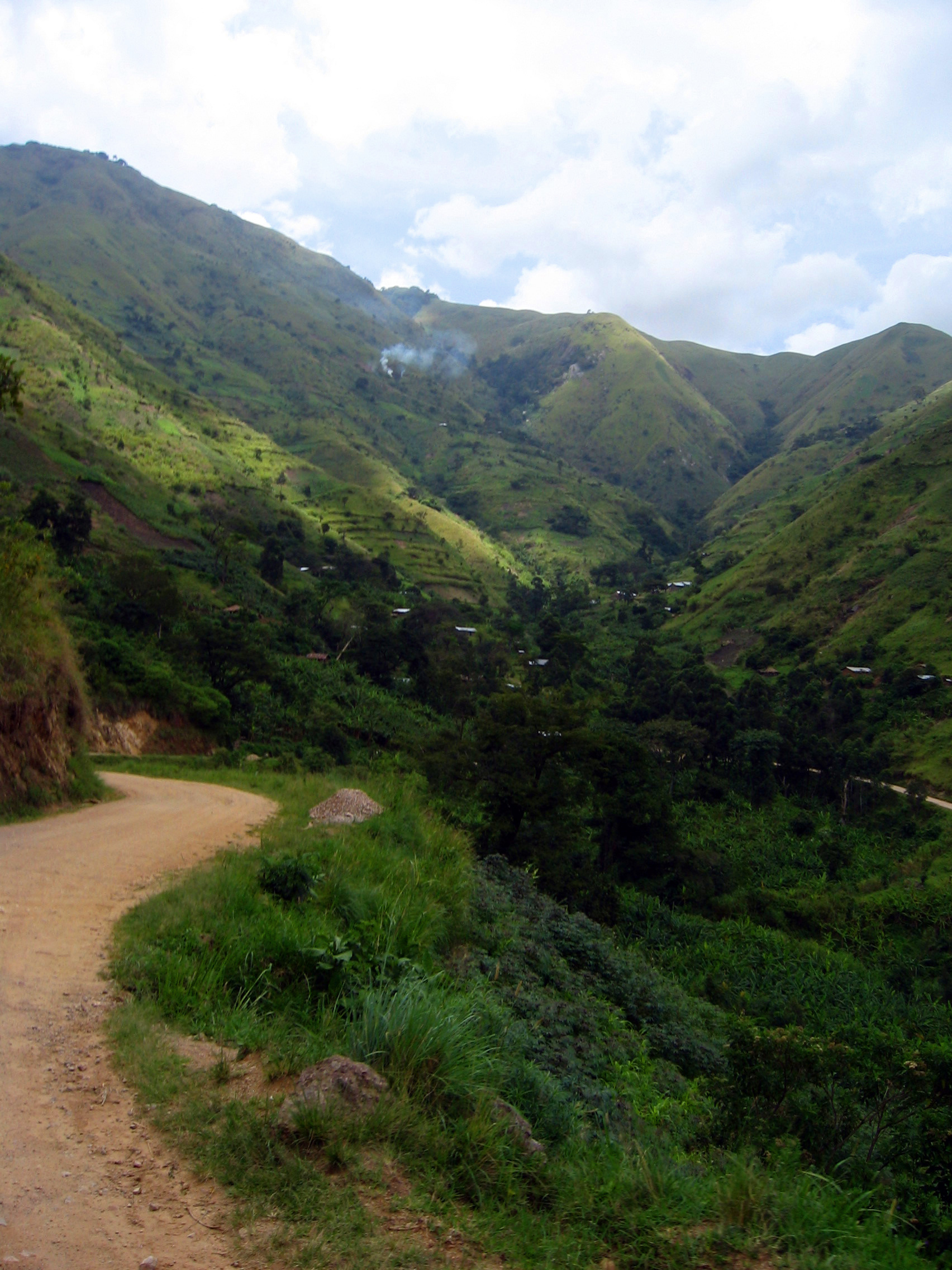
Rwenzori Mountains light forest

== Habitat ==
Congolian forests and Albertine Rift montane forests.

== Biogeographic realm ==
This species is located in the Afrotropical realm.
