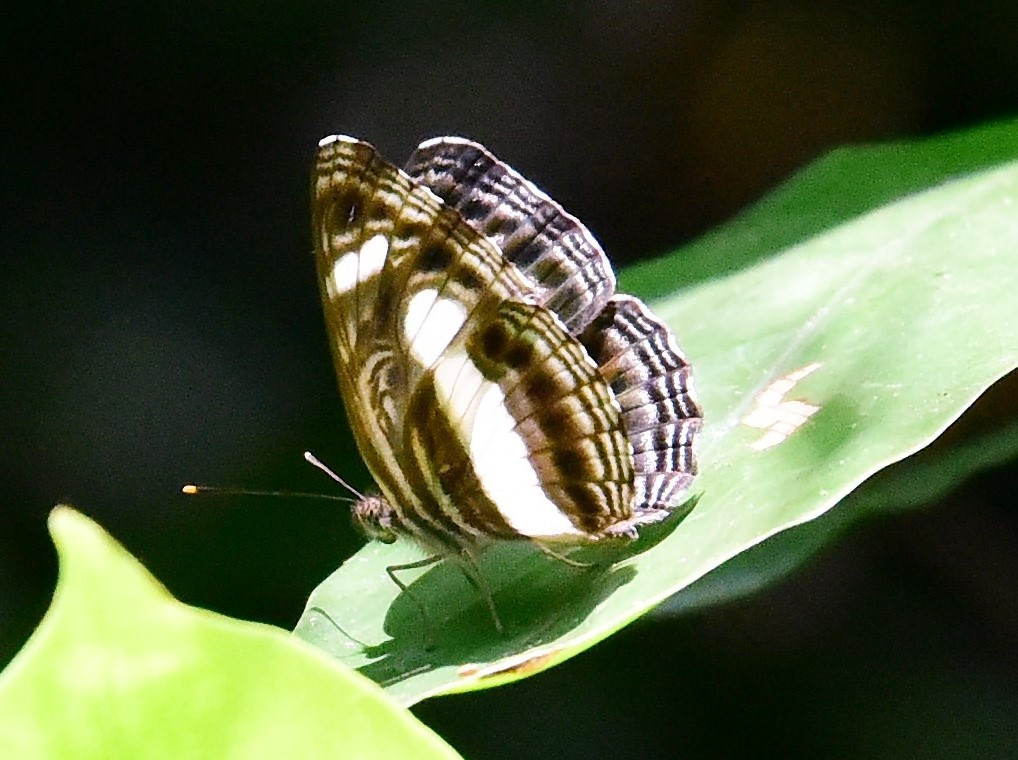

Scientific classification
- Kingdom: Animalia
- Phylum: Arthropoda
- Clade: Pancrustacea
- Class: Insecta
- Order: Lepidoptera
- Family: Nymphalidae
- Genus: Neptis
- Species: N. nemetes

Binomial name
- Neptis nemetes Hewitson, 1868

= Neptis nemetes =

Species of butterfly

Neptis nemetes, commonly known as the Nemetes sailer, is a butterfly in the family Nymphalidae. It is found in western, central and eastern Africa. The habitat consists of lowland forests and riverine thicket.

The larvae feed on Asteraceae species, Alchornea cordifolia and Macaranga and Alchornea species.

== Subspecies ==
- Neptis nemetes nemetes (Senegal, Guinea-Bissau, Burkina-Faso, Guinea, Sierra Leone, Liberia, Ivory Coast, Ghana, Togo, Nigeria, western Cameroon to Democratic Republic of the Congo, Uganda, southern Sudan, western Kenya, Zambia)
- Neptis nemetes margueriteae Fox, 1968 (southern Cameroon, Gabon, Equatorial Guinea: Mbini, Congo, Democratic Republic of the Congo, Angola, southern Sudan, Uganda, western Kenya, western Tanzania, Zambia)
- Neptis nemetes obtusa Rothschild & Jordan, 1903 (Ethiopia)

Torben Larsen developed a species numbering system for his 2005 publication Butterflies of West Africa. The nominate subspecies is #901. The 'Larsen' numbers have since been used with permission in A Sharp Eye on Butterflies of Ghana.
