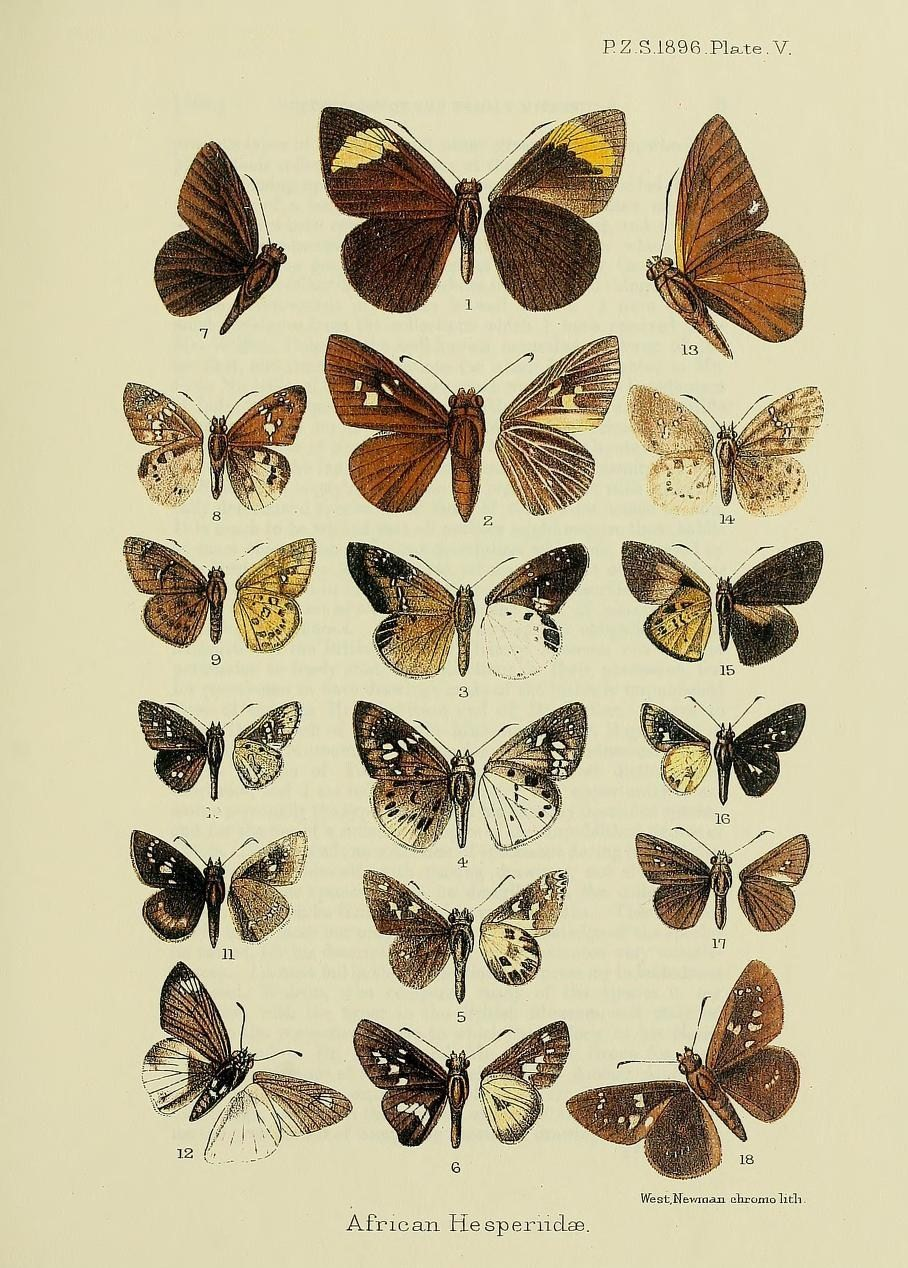
- Loxolexis holocausta figure 13

Scientific classification
- Kingdom: Animalia
- Phylum: Arthropoda
- Class: Insecta
- Order: Lepidoptera
- Family: Hesperiidae
- Genus: Ortholexis
- Species: O. holocausta

Binomial name
- Ortholexis holocausta (Mabille, 1891)

Synonyms
- Erionota holocausta Mabille, 1891; Katreus holocausta (Mabille, 1891); Loxolexis holocausta (Mabille, 1891)

= Ortholexis holocausta =

Species of butterfly

Ortholexis holocausta, the cinnamon scarce sprite, is a species of butterfly in the family Hesperiidae. It is found in Sierra Leone, Ivory Coast, Ghana, Nigeria, Cameroon, the Republic of the Congo, the Democratic Republic of the Congo and north-western Zambia. The habitat consists of forests.
