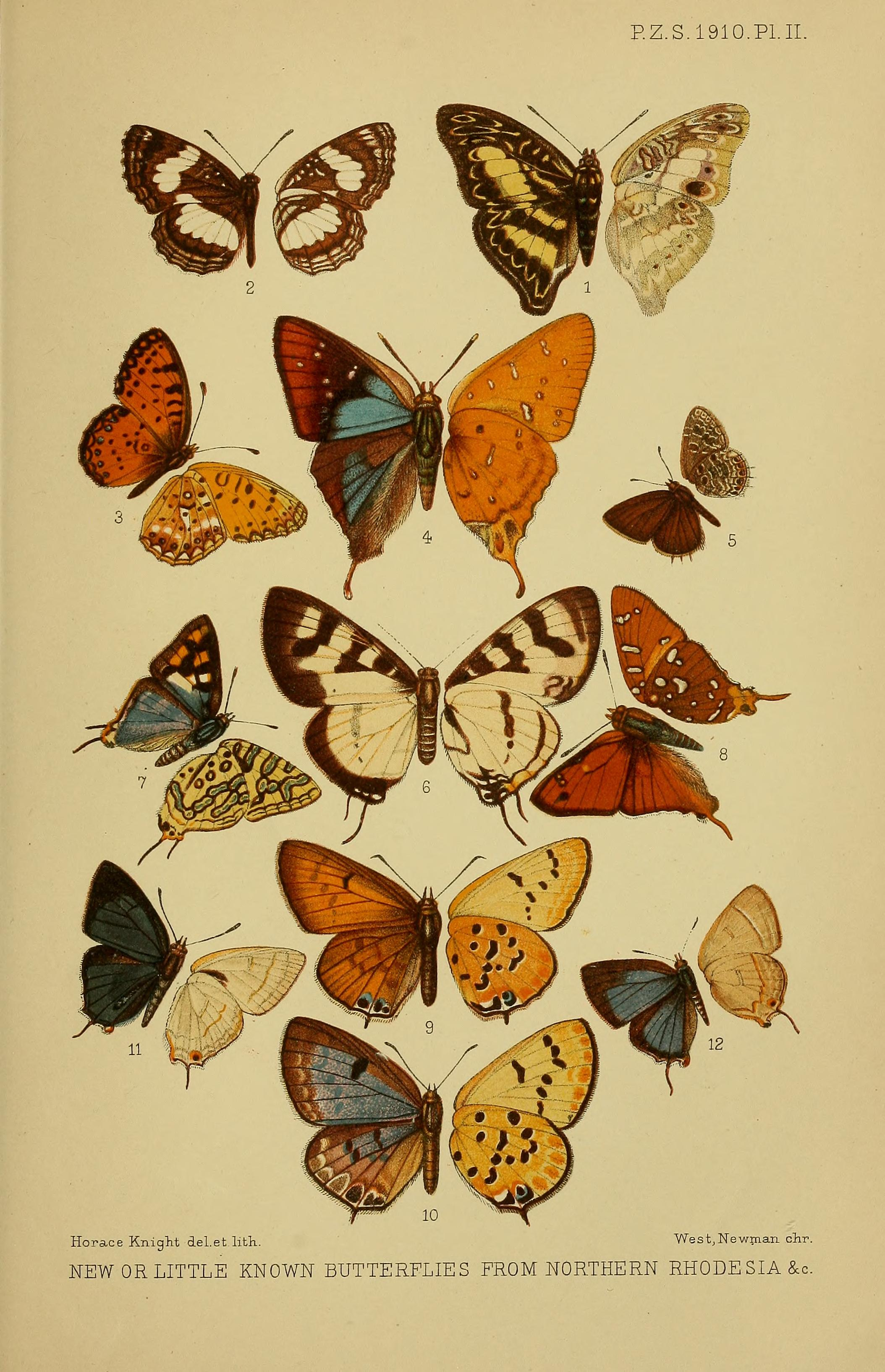
- Figures 9 and 10

Scientific classification
- Kingdom: Animalia
- Phylum: Arthropoda
- Class: Insecta
- Order: Lepidoptera
- Family: Lycaenidae
- Genus: Lepidochrysops
- Species: L. cupreus

Binomial name
- Lepidochrysops cupreus (Neave, 1910)

Synonyms
- Catochrysops cupreus Neave, 1910; Neochrysops cupreus

= Lepidochrysops cupreus =

Species of butterfly

Lepidochrysops cupreus is a butterfly in the family Lycaenidae. It is found in south-western Tanzania, the southern part of the Democratic Republic of the Congo and Zambia. The habitat consists of Brachystegia woodland at altitudes between 1,000 and 1,200 meters and montane grassland or stunted montane woodland at altitudes between 1,600 and 2,000 meters.

Adults are on wing from August to September (Mpanda, Tanzania), from November to December (in Iringa, Tanzania) and in November (in Zambia).
