= Lepidochrysops peculiaris =

Scientific classification
- Kingdom: Animalia
- Phylum: Arthropoda
- Class: Insecta
- Order: Lepidoptera
- Family: Lycaenidae
- Genus: Lepidochrysops
- Species: L. peculiaris

Binomial name
- Lepidochrysops peculiaris (Rogenhofer, 1891)

Synonyms
- Chrysophanus peculiaris Rogenhofer, 1891; Neochrysops peculiaris; Lycaena perpulchra Holland, 1892; Castalius hypoleucus Butler, 1893; Catochrysops hypoleucus; Lycaena exclusa Trimen, 1894

Species of butterfly

Lepidochrysops peculiaris, the peculiar blue, is a butterfly in the family Lycaenidae. It is found in Kenya, Tanzania, Malawi, Zambia, Mozambique and Zimbabwe. The habitat consists of heavy woodland, coastal forests, grassland and grassy areas in savanna.

Both sexes feed from the flowers of herbaceous plants and small bushes. Adults have been recorded on wing from October to January and in September and December.

The larvae feed on Lantana camara.

== Subspecies ==
- Lepidochrysops peculiaris peculiaris (coast of Kenya, Tanzania: coast and Usambara Mountains)
- Lepidochrysops peculiaris hypoleucus (Butler, 1893) (Kenya: inland areas, Tanzania, Malawi, Zambia, Mozambique, Zimbabwe)
