= Lepidochrysops chala =

Scientific classification
- Kingdom: Animalia
- Phylum: Arthropoda
- Class: Insecta
- Order: Lepidoptera
- Family: Lycaenidae
- Genus: Lepidochrysops
- Species: L. chala

Binomial name
- Lepidochrysops chala Kielland, 1980

Species of butterfly

Lepidochrysops chala is a butterfly in the family Lycaenidae. It is found in Tanzania and Zambia. The habitat consists of rocky grassland and montane grassland at altitudes of 2,000 to 2,200 meters.

Adults are attracted to flowers of low-growing plants. They are on wing from August to early October.
