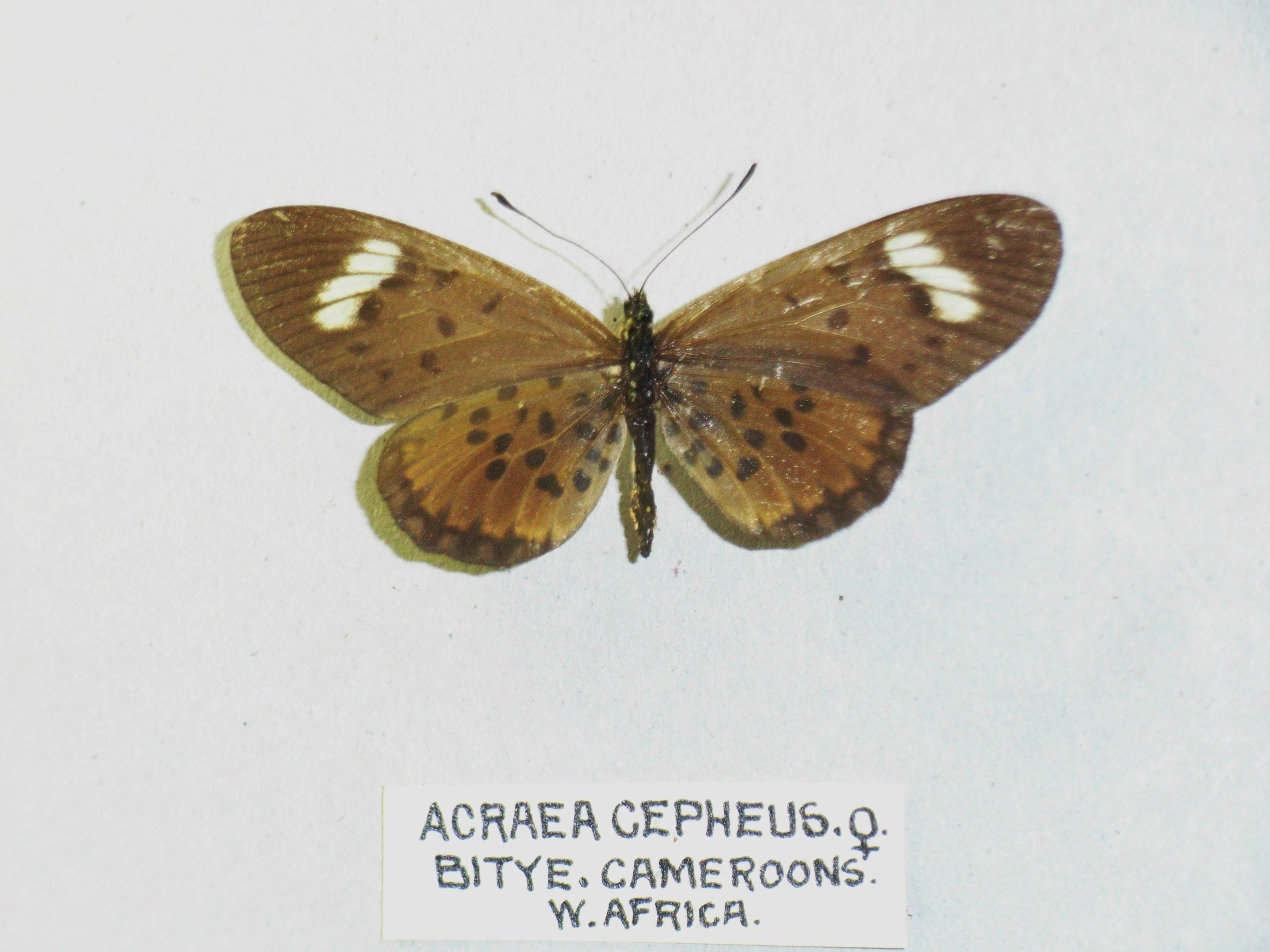

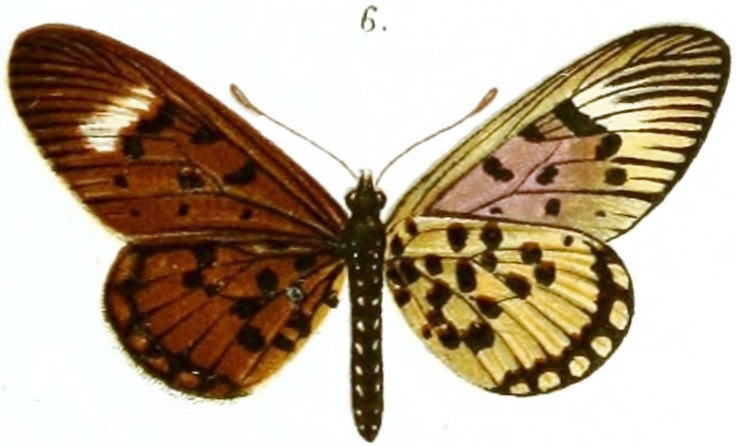

Scientific classification
- Kingdom: Animalia
- Phylum: Arthropoda
- Clade: Pancrustacea
- Class: Insecta
- Order: Lepidoptera
- Family: Nymphalidae
- Genus: Acraea
- Species: A. cepheus

Binomial name
- Acraea cepheus (Linnaeus, 1758)

Synonyms
- Papilio cepheus Linnaeus, 1758; Acraea zosteria Godart,[1819]; Acraea baumanni Rogenhofer, 1890; Acraea cepheus pheusaca Suffert, 1904; Acraea cepheus sucepha Suffert, 1904; Acraea cepheus f. cepheana Strand, 1914; Acraea cepheus cepheus aberratio form disjuncta Dufrane, 1945; Acraea cepheus cepheus aberratio form addenda Dufrane, 1945; Acraea cepheus cepheus aberratio form deficiens Dufrane, 1945

= Acraea cepheus =

Cepheus acraea

Species of butterfly

Acraea cepheus, the Cepheus acraea, is a butterfly of the family Nymphalidae. It is found in Africa, from Nigeria and Angola to Uganda, western Tanzania and Zambia.

== Description ==
A. cepheus L. (54 f) differs from all the African Acraeids known to me in the hindwing having a submarginal dot in cellule 7, so that there are 3 black dots in this cellule; the forewing has a black transverse streak at the middle and one at the apex of the cell and large discal dots, of which the one in 1 b is nearer to the distal margin than that in 2 and those in cellules 3 to 6 form a transverse band, at least in the male the submarginal dots are often united with the black marginal band. The marginal band of the hindwing is 2 mm. in breadth, proximally dentate on the veins, above unicolorous, beneath spotted with light yellow, and the discal dots are approximated to the base; beneath the ground-colour is light yellowish to whitish, with large red or orange-yellow spots between the black dots and at the marginal band. In the type-form, described by Linne and figured by Clerck from the type in his rare work Icones insectorum, the forewing has in 3 to 6 beyond the discal dots a light subapical band, which in the male is red-yellow, in the female white; in the basal part of the forewing is red-yellow as far as the submarginal dots in lb and 2 and the discal dots in 3 to 6, and the hindwing above red-yellow, black-scaled at the base; in the female both wings above are black-grey with smaller dots than in the male; the hindwing often somewhat tinged with yellowish. Gold Coast to Angola and the Soudan. -abdera Hew. [ now species Acraea abdera ](54 f male) differs in the absence of the light subapical band of the forewing and in having both wings above more broadly black at the base. Nigeria to the Congo.- In eginopsis Auriv.[now subspecies of Acraea abdera] the forewing of the male has a blackish ground-colour above and has only in the distal half of cellules 1 a and 1 b a large red-yellow spot; the hindwing coloured as in the type-form. Sierra Leone to Togoland. - female aberratio form pheusaca Suff. Forewing above yellow-brown as far as the ochre-yellow subapical band, with the black dots small or absent; hindwing above brown-yellow with small discal dots; occurs together with abdera. Female aberratio form sucepha Suff. Wings above with red-yellow ground-colour as in the male and the forewing with white subapical band. Marginal band of the hindwing above with yellow marginal spots. Among the type-form. Female aberratio form nigrescens Eltr. [now forma of abdera ] (54 f; as abdera female). Both wings above black-brown with distinct black dots; the hindwing above somewhat lighter before the marginal band; the latter with marginal spots; is probably the female of eginopsis. Sierra Leone.

== Biology ==
The habitat consists of forests.

The larvae feed on Caloncoba welwitschii and Lindackeria dentata.

== Taxonomy ==
It is a member of the Acraea cepheus species group.
