= Ypthima pupillaris =

Scientific classification
- Kingdom: Animalia
- Phylum: Arthropoda
- Class: Insecta
- Order: Lepidoptera
- Family: Nymphalidae
- Genus: Ypthima
- Species: Y. pupillaris

Binomial name
- Ypthima pupillaris Butler, 1888

Synonyms
- Ypthima pupillaris ab. depupillata Strand, 1909; Ypthima pupillaris ab. macrocellata Strand, 1913; Ypthima gazana van Son, 1955

Species of butterfly

Ypthima pupillaris, the eyed ringlet, is a butterfly in the family Nymphalidae. It is found in Guinea, Ivory Coast, Ghana, Togo, Nigeria, Cameroon, the Republic of the Congo, the Democratic Republic of the Congo, Sudan, Ethiopia, Uganda, Kenya, Tanzania, Malawi, Zambia, Zimbabwe, and Mozambique. It is allied to doleta - smoke-brown; wings above with the marginal part lighter, proximally bounded by a dark line, with two fine marginal lines; forewing with a large, oval, bi-pupilled eye-spot; hindwing with an eye-spot in cellule 2 and a very small double one in 1 c. Wings beneath grey, densely striated with olive-brown, a submarginal stripe and a marginal line dark. Hindwing beneath with three eye-spots, one with double pupil in 1 c, one in 2 and a larger in 6. Central Africa.

The habitat consists of grassland at altitudes above 1,500 meters and woodland. Adults are on wing in June, September, October, February, March and April.

== Subspecies ==
The species may be divided into the following subspecies:

- Ypthima pupillaris pupillaris (Guinea, Ivory Coast, Ghana, Togo, Nigeria, Cameroon, Congo, Democratic Republic of the Congo, Sudan, Uganda, northern Zambia, northern and eastern Zimbabwe, Mozambique)
- Ypthima pupillaris obscurata Kielland, 1982 (Ethiopia, Kenya, Democratic Republic of the Congo, western Tanzania, Malawi)
