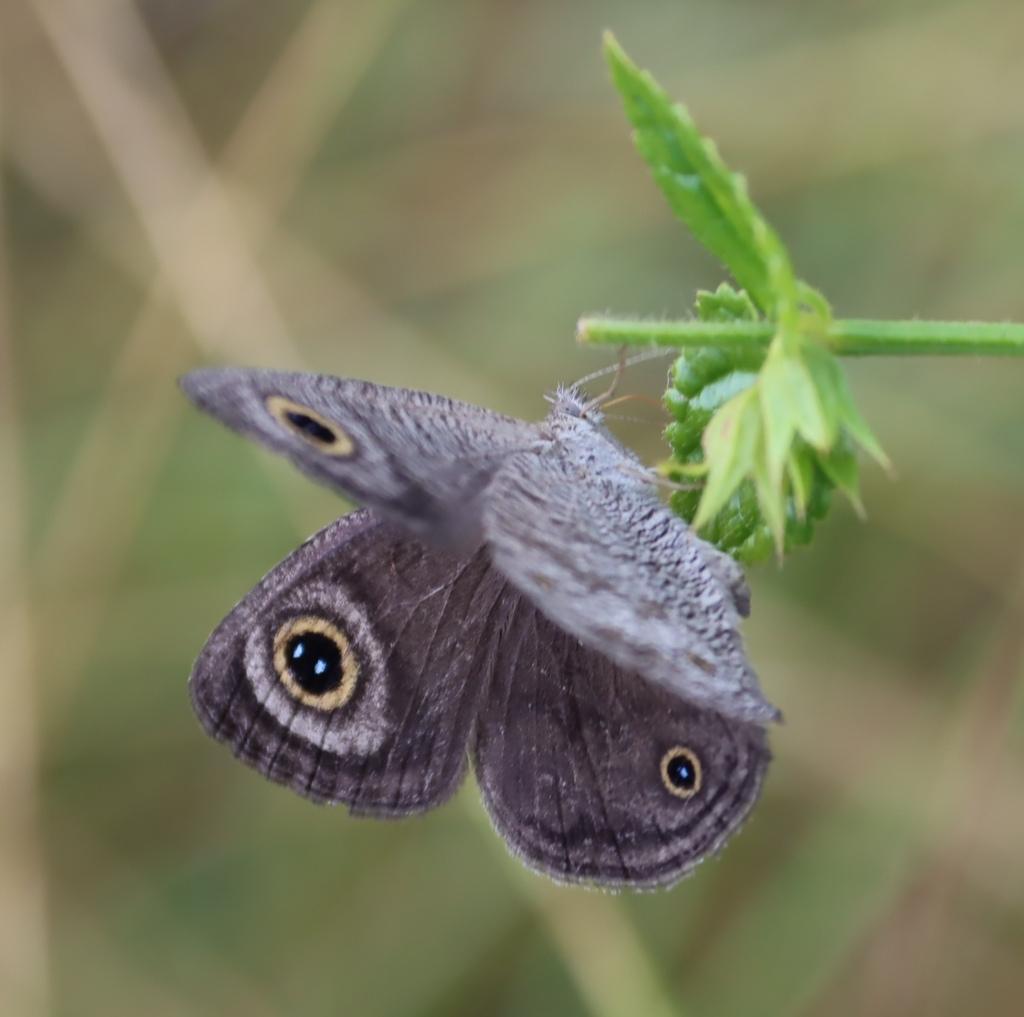

Scientific classification
- Kingdom: Animalia
- Phylum: Arthropoda
- Class: Insecta
- Order: Lepidoptera
- Family: Nymphalidae
- Genus: Ypthima
- Species: Y. impura

Binomial name
- Ypthima impura Elwes & Edwards, 1893

Synonyms
- Ypthima impura f. impura Elwes & Edwards, 1893; Ypthima pupillaris paupera Ungemach, 1932; Ypthima pupillaris f. hiemis Ungemach, 1932; Ypthima impura f. badhami van Son, 1955; Ypthima badhami; Ypthima paupera

= Ypthima impura =

Species of butterfly

Ypthima impura, the impure ringlet (known in Afrikaans as the vuil-ringetjie), is a butterfly of the family Nymphalidae. It is found in most of Sub-Saharan Africa.

The wingspan is 32–36 mm for males and 34–38 mm for females. It is close to Ypthima doletaThe wings above brown; both wings with a narrow dark submarginal band and a double dark marginal line; eye-spot area of the forewing subelliptical, sharply defined distally; hindwing above with an eye-spot in cellule 2 and sometimes 1 or 2 in cellule 1 c, the area round them not defined, beneath with three eye-spots, a double one in 1 c and one eachin 2 and 6.

Adults are on wing year round with peak in early summer and autumn in southern Africa. The butterfly usually has three ocelli on the underside of their hindwing, although these may not appear during the dry season.

The larvae feed on Poaceae grasses. Larvae have also been reared on Ehrharta erecta. Females are usually more sedentary than males, with stouter abdomens.

== Subspecies ==
The species may be divided into the following subspecies:

- Ypthima impura impura (Ivory Coast to Nigeria, Cameroon, Zaire, Angola)
- Ypthima impura paupera Ungemach, 1932 -Bushveld ringlet (Ethiopia, from eastern Africa to Transvaal and KwaZulu-Natal)
