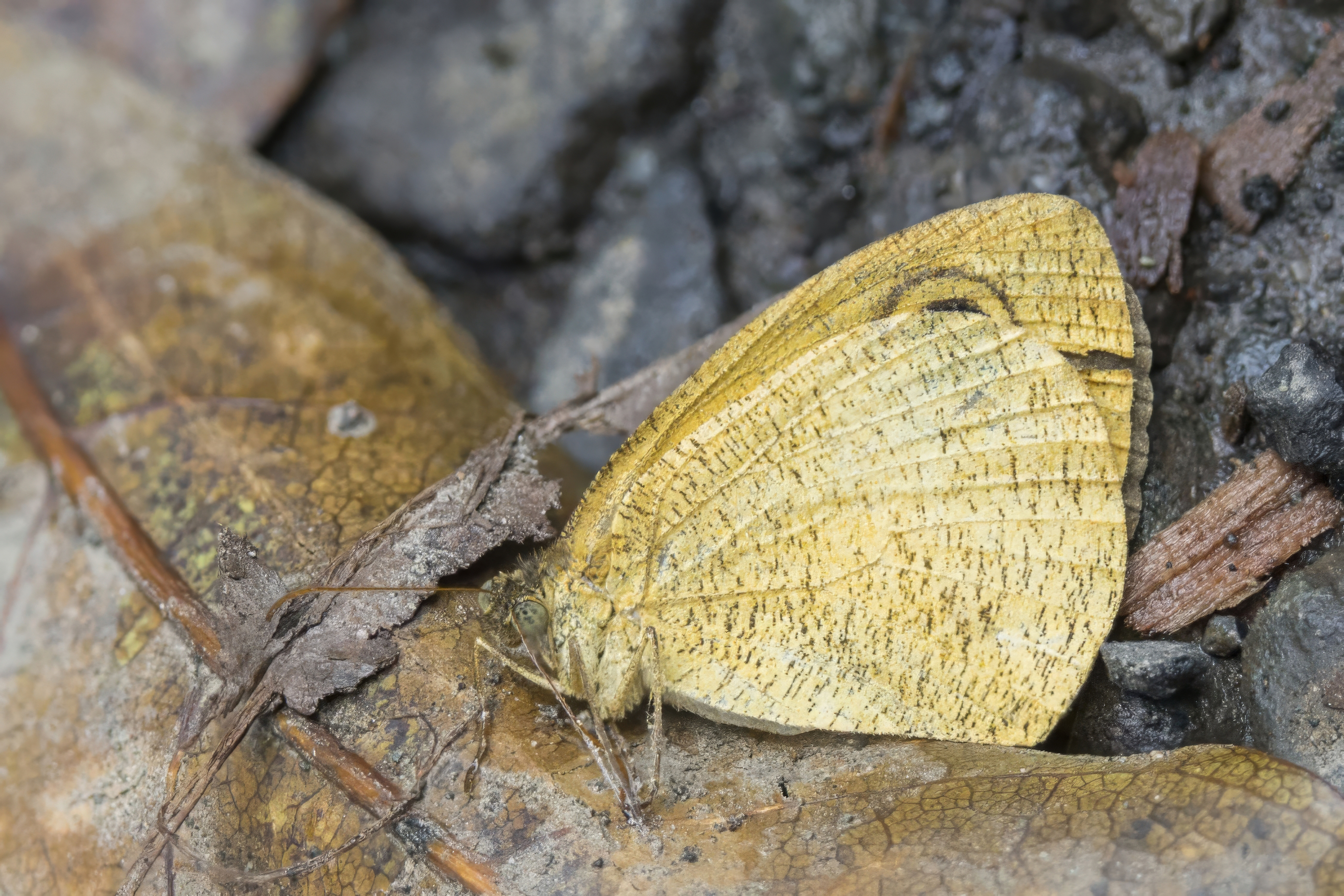
- On Viti Levu

Scientific classification
- Kingdom: Animalia
- Phylum: Arthropoda
- Class: Insecta
- Order: Lepidoptera
- Family: Nymphalidae
- Genus: Ypthima
- Species: Y. sesara

Binomial name
- Ypthima sesara Hewitson, 1865

= Ypthima sesara =

Species of insect

Ypthima sesara, also known by its common name common Fijian ringlet, is a species from the genus Ypthima. This butterfly was first described by William Chapman Hewitson in 1865. It is endemic to Fiji.
