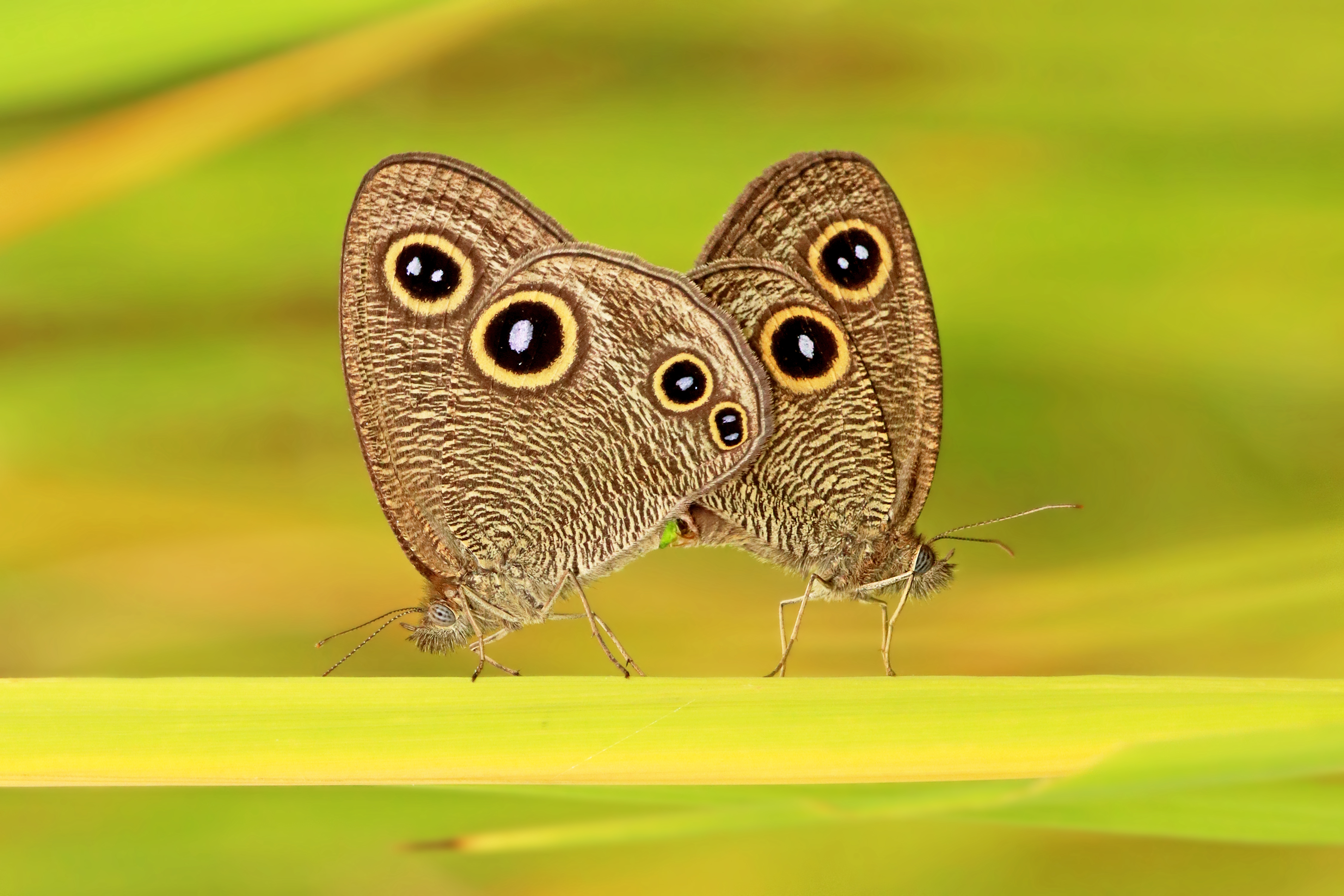
- Underside (mating pair)
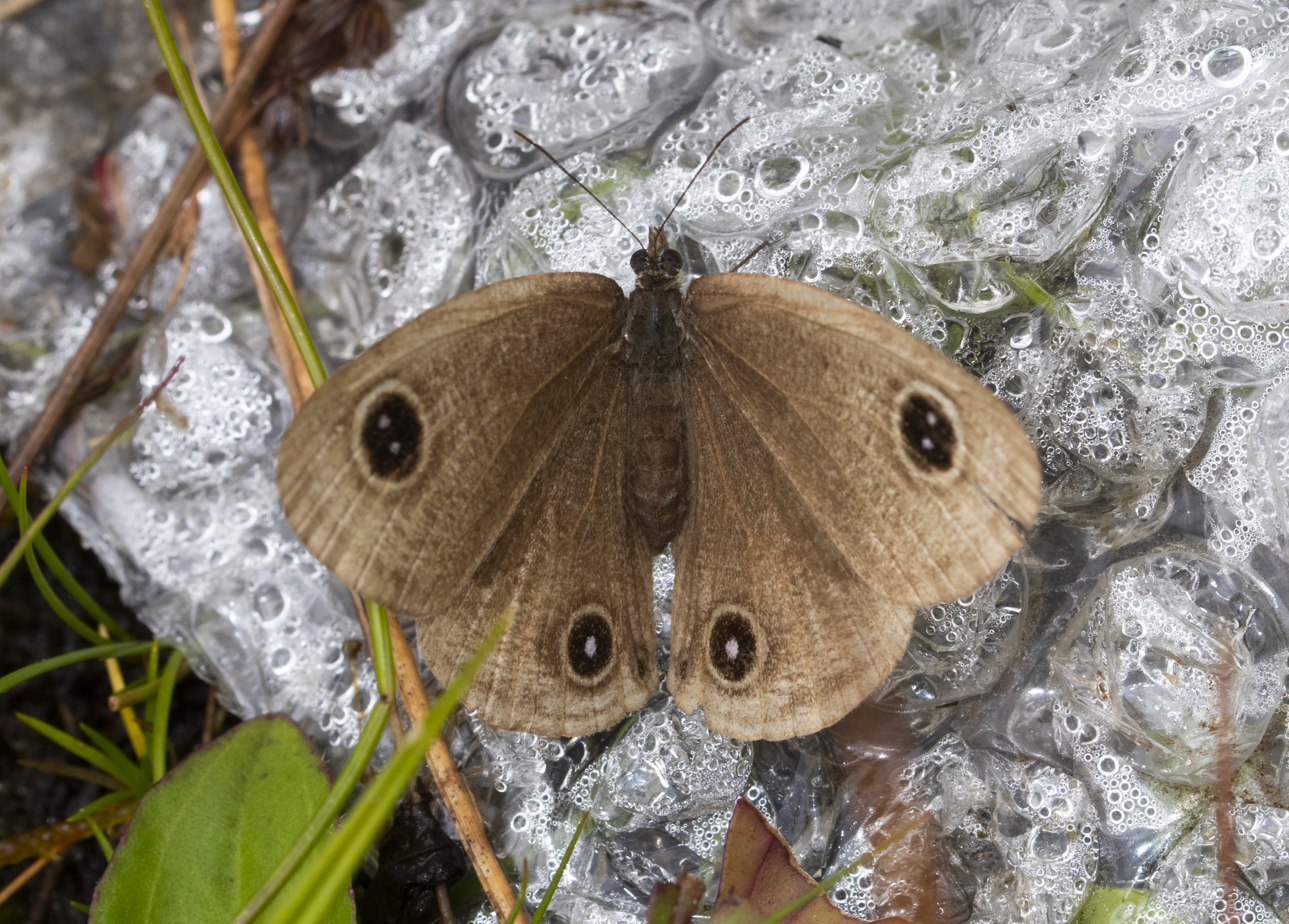
- Female upperside

Scientific classification
- Kingdom: Animalia
- Phylum: Arthropoda
- Clade: Pancrustacea
- Class: Insecta
- Order: Lepidoptera
- Family: Nymphalidae
- Genus: Ypthima
- Species: Y. newara

Binomial name
- Ypthima newara Moore, 1875

Synonyms
- Ypthima nareda newara

= Ypthima newara =

Species of butterfly

Ypthima newara, also known as the Newar threering, is a butterfly in the family Nymphalidae. It is found in the Himalayas from Pakistan to China. It was described by Frederic Moore in 1875.

== Description ==
The upperside of the male is brown. The forewing has a single subapical ocellus, while the hindwing has two ocelli, one of which is bipupiled and the other has a single pupil. The upperside of the female is similar to the male except it has one ocellus on both wings.

The underside is yellowish grey and partly covered with numerous short strigae. The forewing has a single bipupiled ocelli while the hindwing has three. The apical ocellus is very large, the anal ocellus is bipupiled while the rest have a single pupil. Both sexes have the same underside.

This species is separated from the similar Ypthima nareda by being larger and by having the position of the ocellus on the forwing less inwardly oblique.

== Subspecies ==
There are two subspecies:

- Ypthima newara newara (found in the Himalayas)
- Yptihma newara yaluzangbui (found in Tibet)
