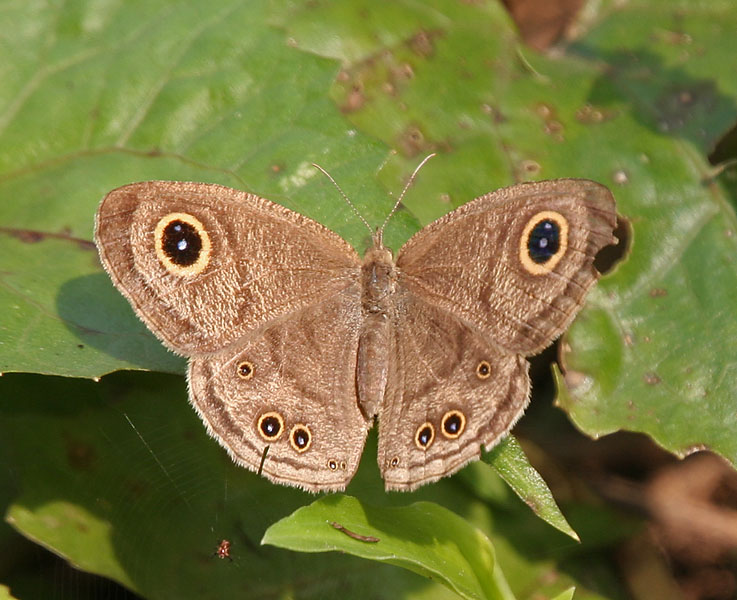
- Y. baldus (common five-ring), upperside, Narendrapur, India
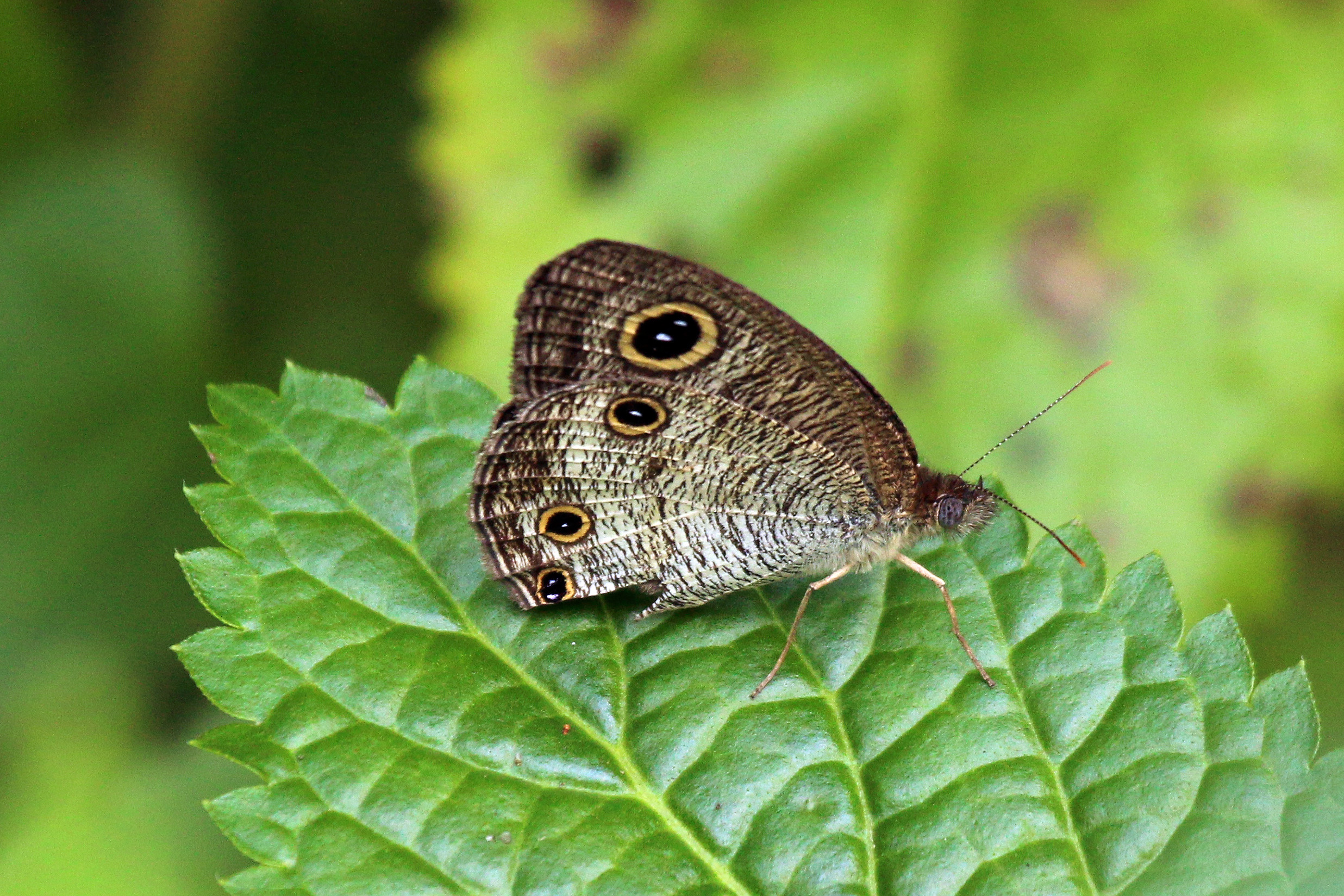
- Ypthima pandocus corticaria (common three-ring), underside, Singapore

Scientific classification
- Kingdom: Animalia
- Phylum: Arthropoda
- Clade: Pancrustacea
- Class: Insecta
- Order: Lepidoptera
- Family: Nymphalidae
- Subfamily: Satyrinae
- Tribe: Satyrini
- Subtribe: Satyrina
- Genus: Ypthima; Hübner, 1818

Species
- See text

Synonyms
- Ypthima: Xois Hewitson, 1865; Kolasa Moore, 1891 (nomen nudum); Thymipa Moore, 1891 (nomen nudum); Kolasa Moore, 1893; Thymipa Moore, 1893; Nadiria Moore, 1893; Pandima Moore, 1893; Lohana Moore, 1893; Dallacha Moore, 1893; Shania Evans, 1912; Sundaypthima Uemura, 1996

= Ypthima =

Genus of brush-footed butterflies

Ypthima is a species-rich genus of Old World butterflies in the family Nymphalidae.

== Species ==
The genus includes the following species:

- Ypthima affectata
- Ypthima akbar
- Ypthima albida
- Ypthima albipuncta
- Ypthima ancus
- Ypthima antennata
- Ypthima aphnius
- Ypthima arctous
- Ypthima asterope
- Ypthima atra
- Ypthima avanta
- Ypthima baileyi
- Ypthima baldus
- Ypthima beautei
- Ypthima bolanica
- Ypthima cantlei
- Ypthima cerealis
- Ypthima ceylonica
- Ypthima chenui
- Ypthima chinensis
- Ypthima ciris
- Ypthima condamini
- Ypthima confusa
- Ypthima congoana
- Ypthima conjuncta
- Ypthima daclaca
- Ypthima dengae
- Ypthima diplommata
- Ypthima dohertyi
- Ypthima doleta
- Ypthima esakii
- Ypthima evansi
- Ypthima fasciata
- Ypthima frontierii
- Ypthima fulvida
- Ypthima gavalisi
- Ypthima granulosa
- Ypthima hanburyi
- Ypthima hannyngtoni
- Ypthima horsfieldii
- Ypthima huebneri
- Ypthima hyagriva
- Ypthima iarba
- Ypthima imitans
- Ypthima impura
- Ypthima indecora
- Ypthima inica
- Ypthima insolita
- Ypthima iris
- Ypthima jacksoni
- Ypthima junkoae
- Ypthima kalelonda
- Ypthima lamto
- Ypthima lihongxingi
- Ypthima lisandra
- Ypthima loryma
- Ypthima lycus
- Ypthima masakii
- Ypthima megalomma
- Ypthima methora
- Ypthima methorina
- Ypthima microphthalma
- Ypthima motscholskyi
- Ypthima multistriata
- Ypthima muotuoensis
- Ypthima nareda
- Ypthima nebulosa
- Ypthima newara
- Ypthima nigricans
- Ypthima nikaea
- Ypthima norma
- Ypthima nynias
- Ypthima pandocus
- Ypthima parasakra
- Ypthima pemakoi
- Ypthima perfecta
- Ypthima persimilis
- Ypthima philomela
- Ypthima praenubila
- Ypthima praestans
- Ypthima pseudodromon
- Ypthima pulchra
- Ypthima pupillaris
- Ypthima putamdui
- Ypthima recta
- Ypthima rhodesiana
- Ypthima risompae
- Ypthima riukiuana
- Ypthima sakra
- Ypthima sarcaposa
- Ypthima savara
- Ypthima sensilis
- Ypthima sesara
- Ypthima similis
- Ypthima simplicia
- Ypthima singala
- Ypthima singorensis
- Ypthima sinica
- Ypthima sobrina
- Ypthima sordida
- Ypthima stellera
- Ypthima striata
- Ypthima tappana
- Ypthima tiani
- Ypthima vuattouxi
- Ypthima watsoni
- Ypthima yangjiahei
- Ypthima yatta
- Ypthima yayeyamana
- Ypthima yoshinobui
- Ypthima ypthimoides
- Ypthima yunosukei
- Ypthima zyzzomacula
