= Ypthima lamto =

Lamto ringlet

Scientific classification
- Kingdom: Animalia
- Phylum: Arthropoda
- Class: Insecta
- Order: Lepidoptera
- Family: Nymphalidae
- Genus: Ypthima
- Species: Y. lamto

Binomial name
- Ypthima lamto Kielland, 1982

Species of butterfly

Ypthima lamto, the Lamto ringlet, is a butterfly in the family Nymphalidae. It is found in Ivory Coast, central Ghana and Cameroon. The habitat probably consists of forest-savanna mosaic.
