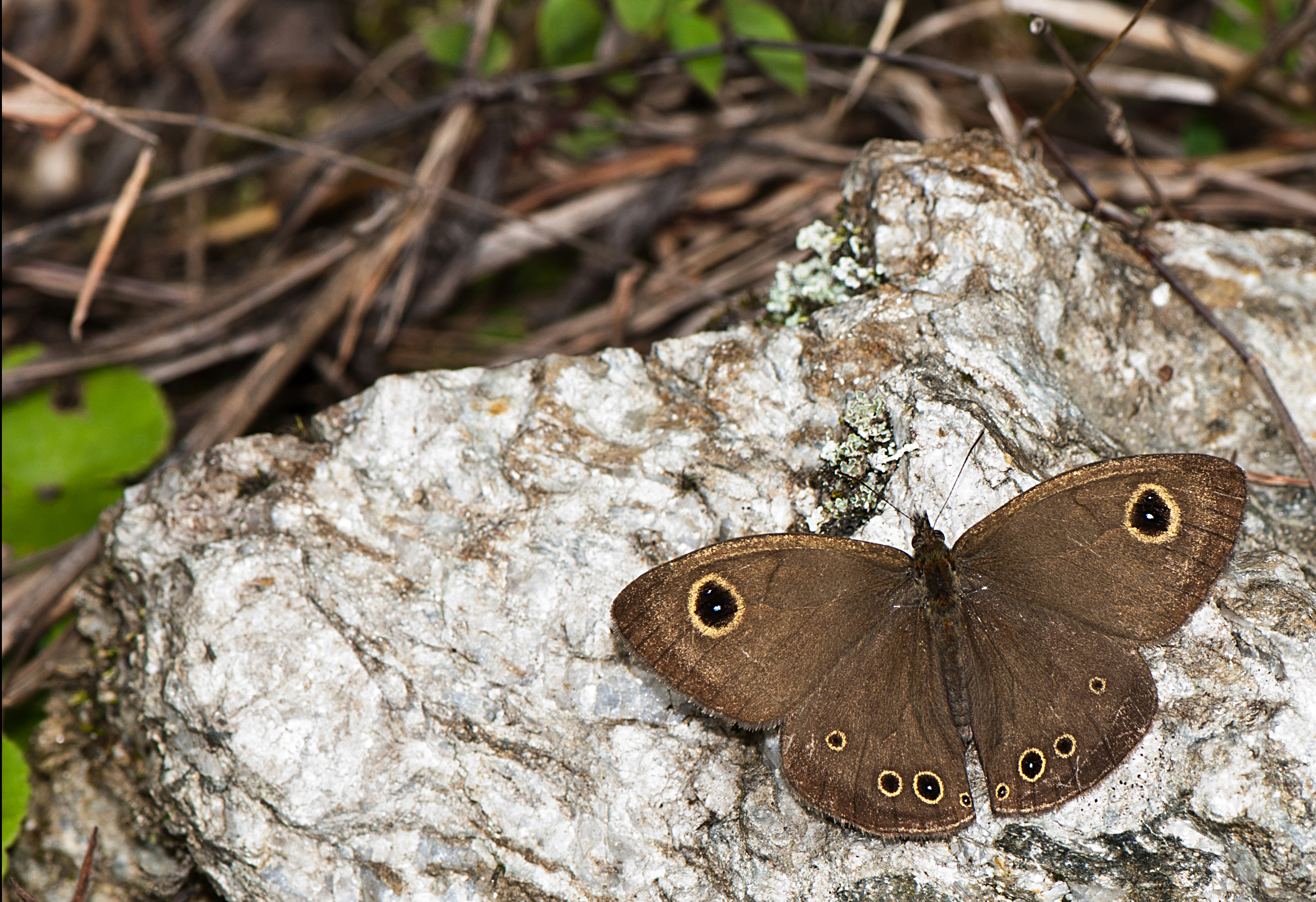
- Dorsal view
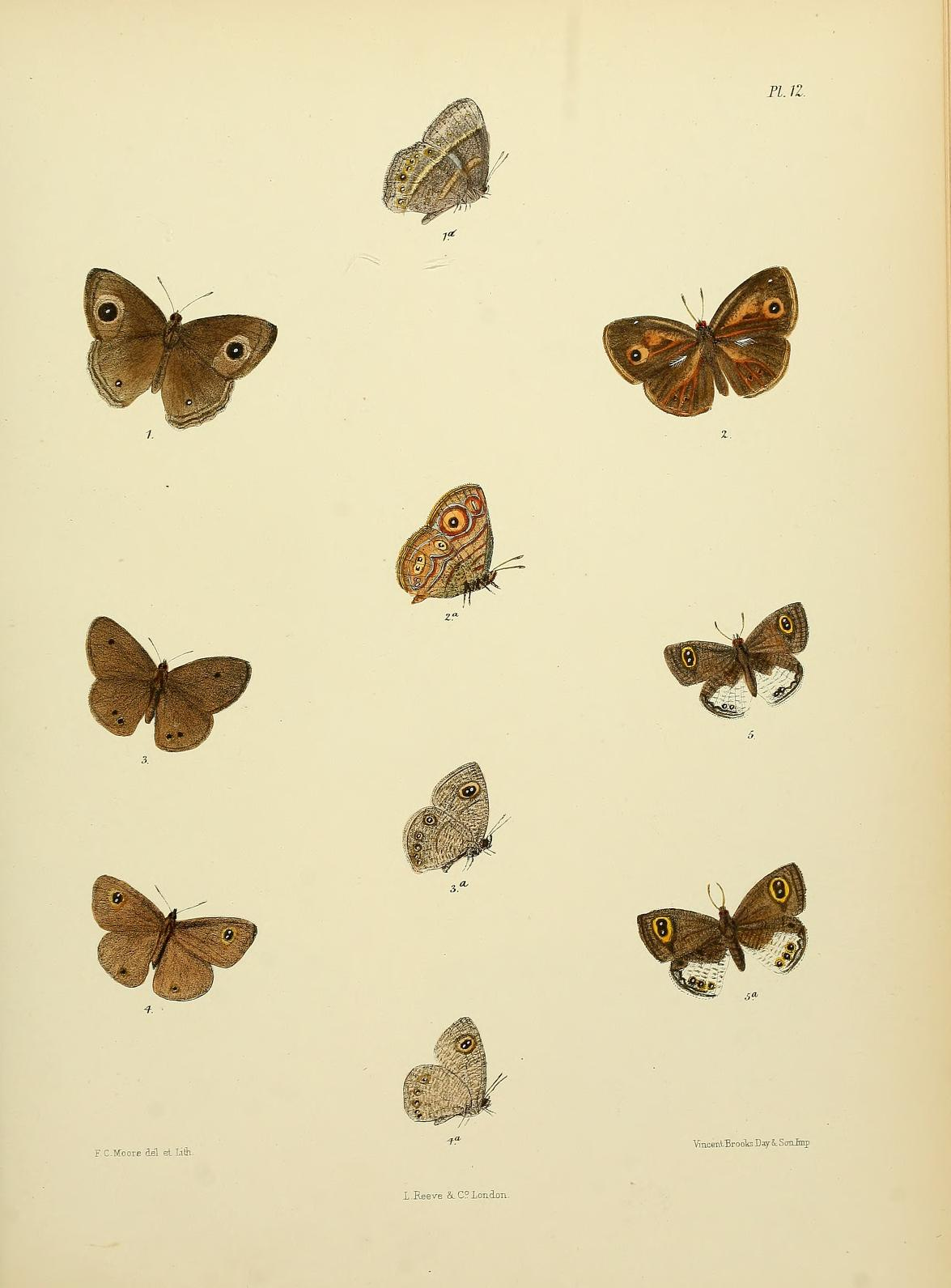
- Ypthima, plate 12 from Frederic Moore's The Lepidoptera of Ceylon. Y. avanta is shown in figures 3, 3a, 4 and 4a.

Scientific classification
- Kingdom: Animalia
- Phylum: Arthropoda
- Class: Insecta
- Order: Lepidoptera
- Family: Nymphalidae
- Genus: Ypthima
- Species: Y. avanta

Binomial name
- Ypthima avanta Moore, 1875

= Ypthima avanta =

Jewel fourring

Species of butterfly

Ypthima avanta, the jewel fourring, is a species of Satyrinae butterfly found in Asia.
