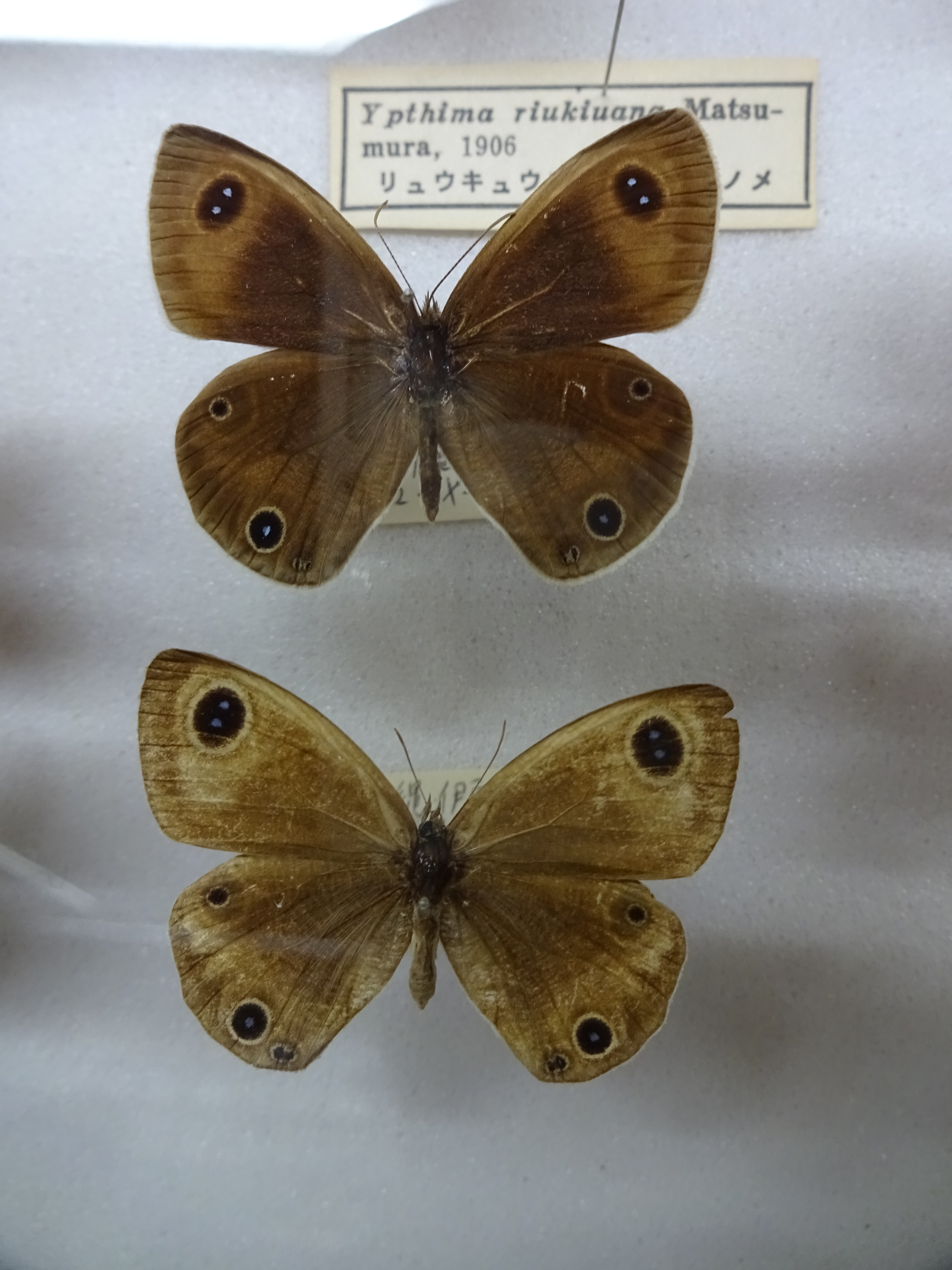

Scientific classification
- Domain: Eukaryota
- Kingdom: Animalia
- Phylum: Arthropoda
- Class: Insecta
- Order: Lepidoptera
- Family: Nymphalidae
- Genus: Ypthima
- Species: Y. riukiuana

Binomial name
- Ypthima riukiuana Matsumura, 1906

= Ypthima riukiuana =

Species of butterfly

Ypthima riukiuana is a species of butterfly in the family Nymphalidae (subfamily Satyrinae). It is an East Palearctic species endemic to Japan.
