= Ypthima pulchra =

Scientific classification
- Kingdom: Animalia
- Phylum: Arthropoda
- Class: Insecta
- Order: Lepidoptera
- Family: Nymphalidae
- Genus: Ypthima
- Species: Y. pulchra

Binomial name
- Ypthima pulchra Overlaet, 1954

Species of butterfly

Ypthima pulchra is a butterfly in the family Nymphalidae. It is found in Nigeria, the Republic of the Congo, Angola, the Democratic Republic of the Congo, and Zambia.
