= Ypthima praestans =

Scientific classification
- Kingdom: Animalia
- Phylum: Arthropoda
- Class: Insecta
- Order: Lepidoptera
- Family: Nymphalidae
- Genus: Ypthima
- Species: Y. praestans

Binomial name
- Ypthima praestans Overlaet, 1954

Species of butterfly

Ypthima praestans is a butterfly in the family Nymphalidae. It is found in Angola, the Democratic Republic of the Congo and Zambia.
