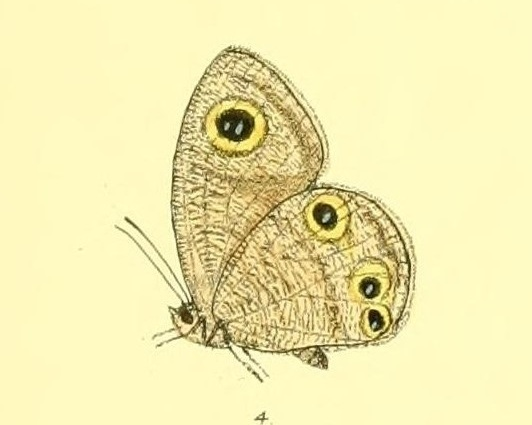
- Wet-season brood

Scientific classification
- Domain: Eukaryota
- Kingdom: Animalia
- Phylum: Arthropoda
- Class: Insecta
- Order: Lepidoptera
- Family: Nymphalidae
- Genus: Ypthima
- Species: Y. watsoni

Binomial name
- Ypthima watsoni (Moore, [1893])

= Ypthima watsoni =

Looped three-ring

Species of butterfly

Ypthima watsoni, the looped three-ring, is a species of Satyrinae butterfly.
