= Ypthima antennata =

Scientific classification
- Domain: Eukaryota
- Kingdom: Animalia
- Phylum: Arthropoda
- Class: Insecta
- Order: Lepidoptera
- Family: Nymphalidae
- Genus: Ypthima
- Species: Y. antennata

Binomial name
- Ypthima antennata van Son, 1955

Species of butterfly

Ypthima antennata, the clubbed ringlet, is a butterfly of the family Nymphalidae. It is found in eastern Africa, South Africa, western Kenya, southern Sudan, Nigeria and Ghana.

The wingspan is 30–34 mm for males and 32–38 mm for females. Adults are on wing year round with peaks from September to May in southern Africa.

The larvae probably feed on Poaceae grasses.

== Subspecies ==
The species may be divided into the following subspecies:

- Ypthima antennata antennata
- Ypthima antennata cornesi Kielland, 1982
