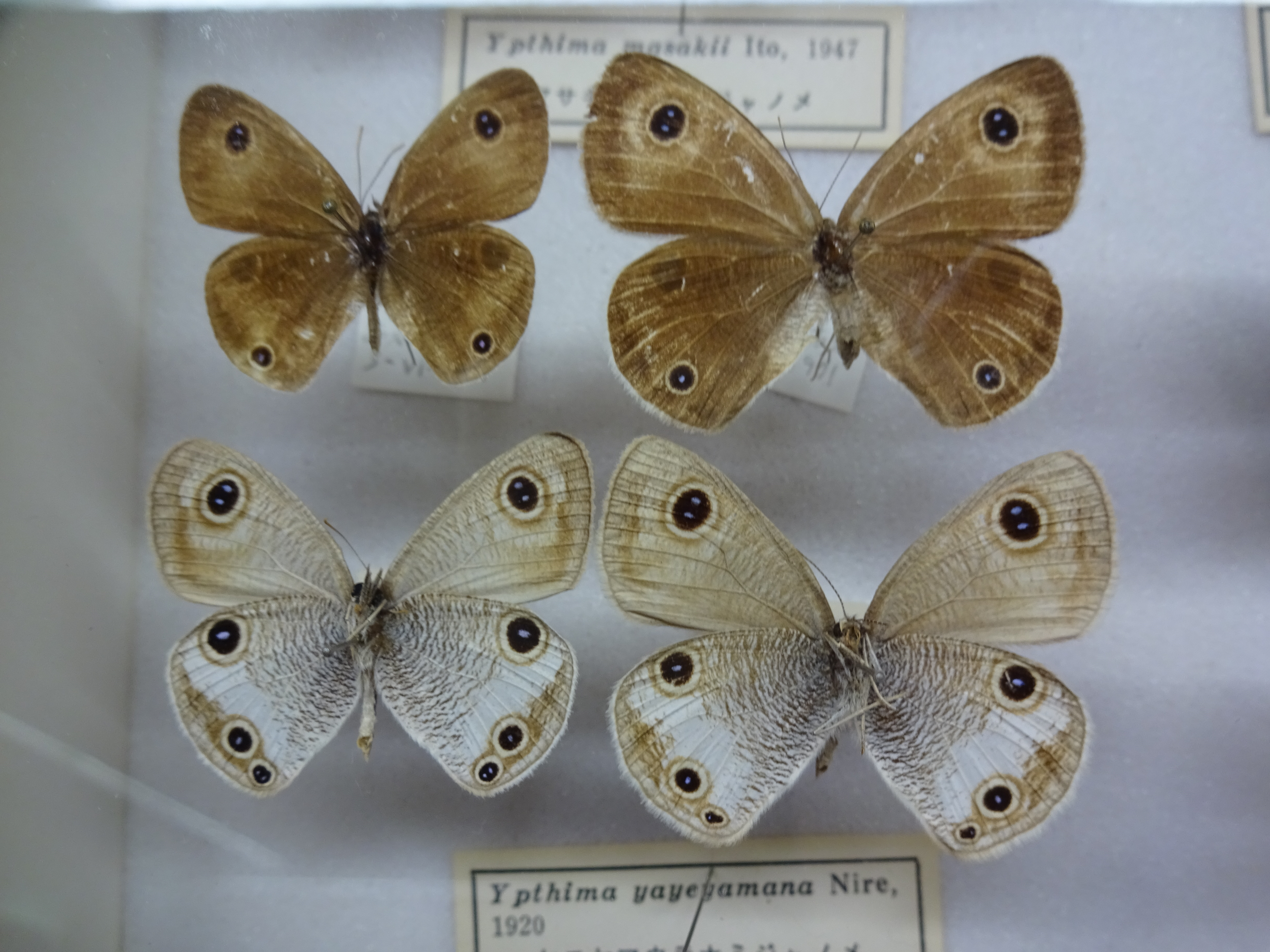

Scientific classification
- Domain: Eukaryota
- Kingdom: Animalia
- Phylum: Arthropoda
- Class: Insecta
- Order: Lepidoptera
- Family: Nymphalidae
- Genus: Ypthima
- Species: Y. masakii

Binomial name
- Ypthima masakii Ito, 1947

= Ypthima masakii =

Species of butterfly

Ypthima masakii is a butterfly in the family Nymphalidae (subfamily Satyrinae). It is endemic to Japan. The type locality is on the Loochoo Islands.
