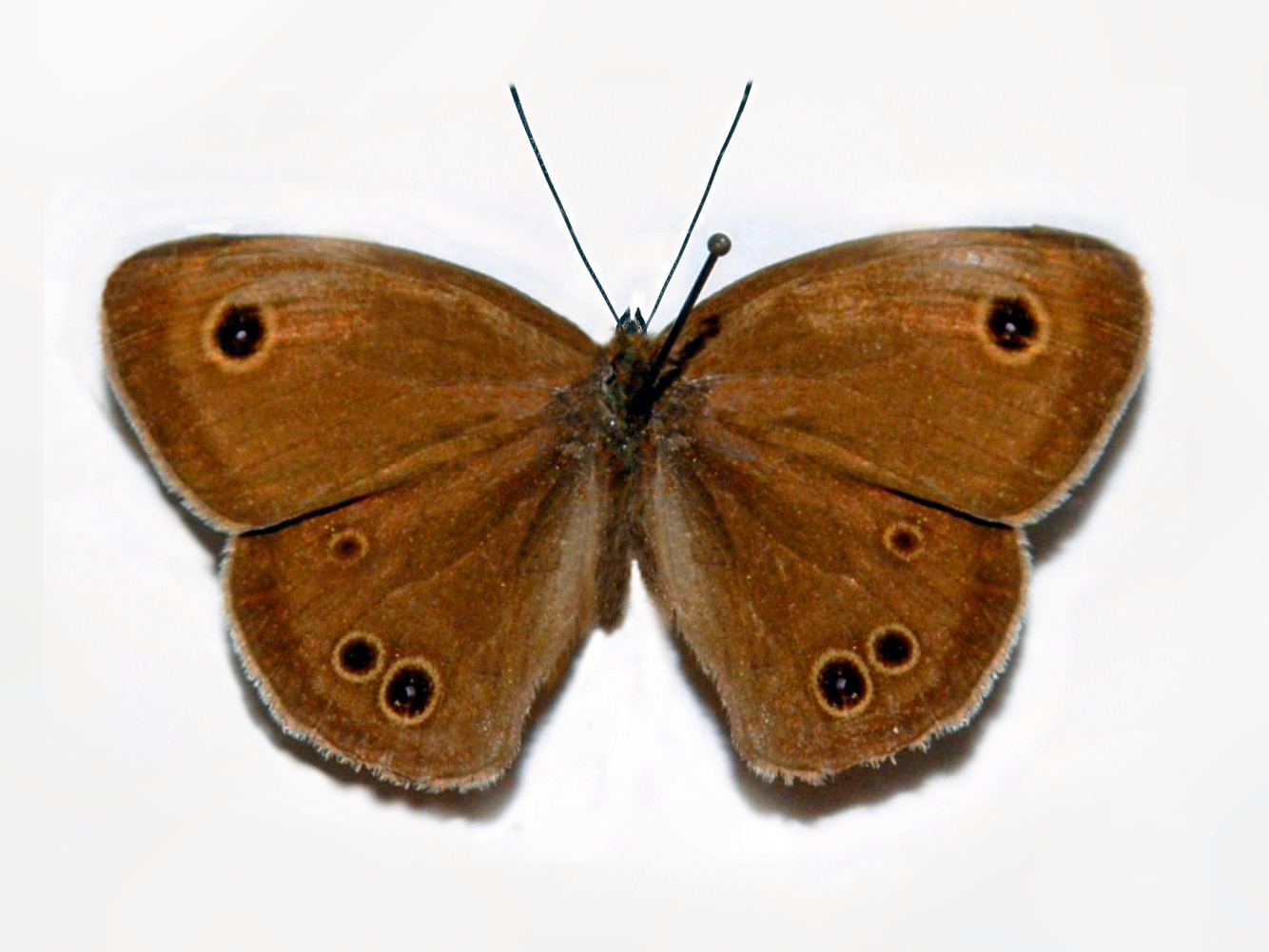
- Upperside of Ypthyma sakra austeni
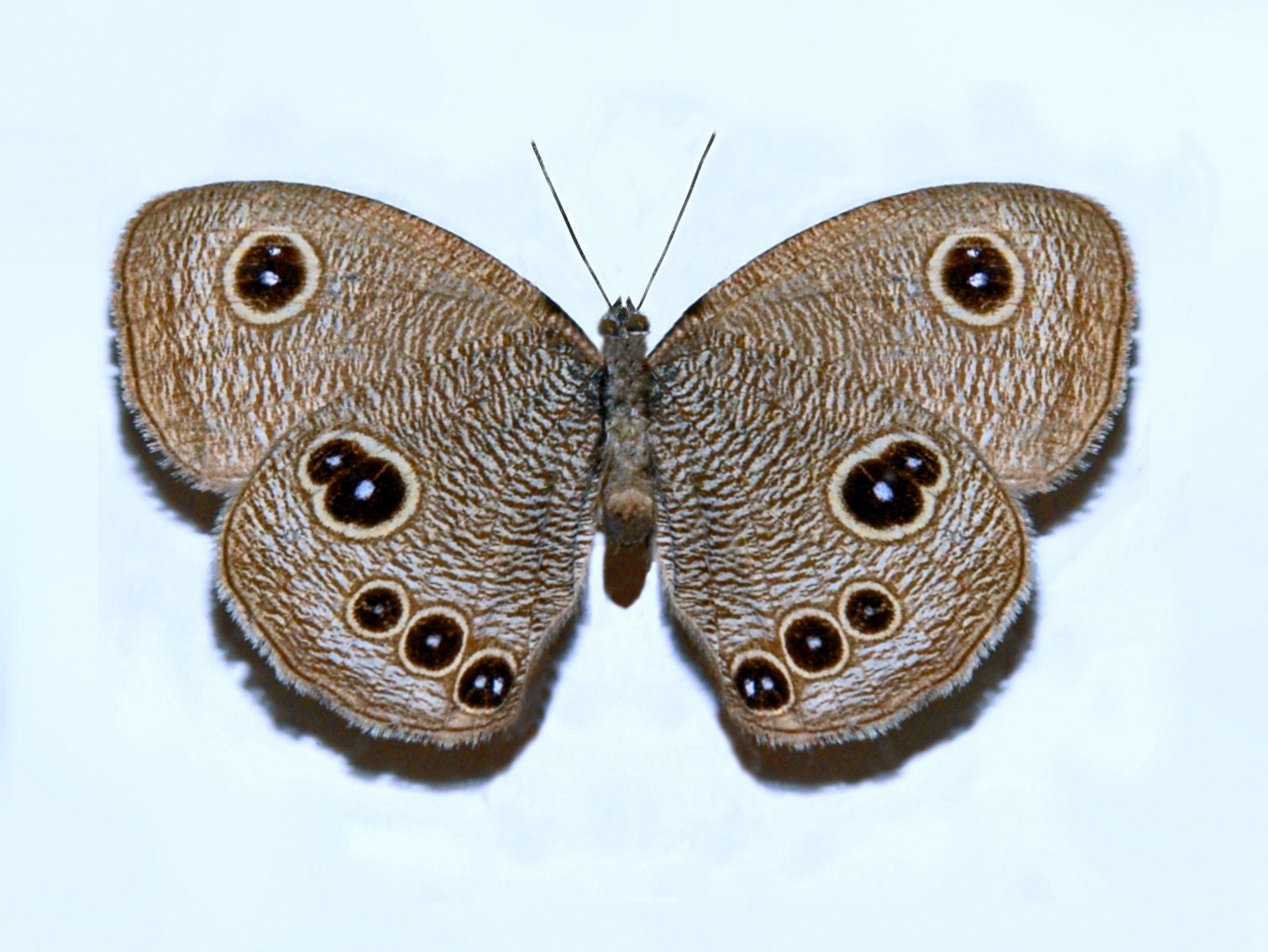
- Underside

Scientific classification
- Kingdom: Animalia
- Phylum: Arthropoda
- Class: Insecta
- Order: Lepidoptera
- Family: Nymphalidae
- Genus: Ypthima
- Species: Y. sakra

Binomial name
- Ypthima sakra Moore, 1857

Synonyms
- Thymipa austeni Moore, 1893

= Ypthima sakra =

Species of butterfly

Ypthima sakra, the Himalayan five-ring, is a butterfly in the family Nymphalidae native to Asia.

== Subspecies ==
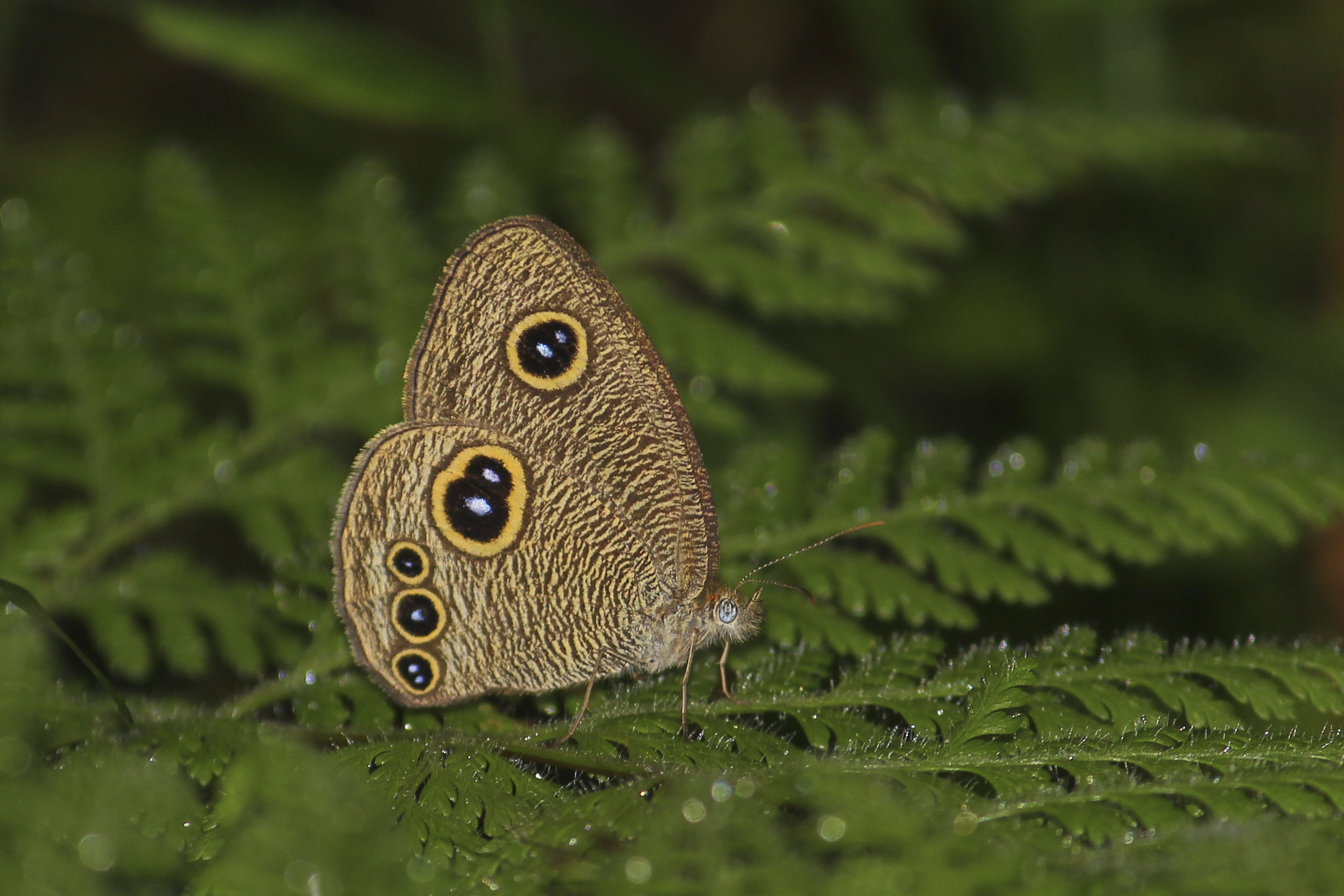
Close wing posture of Ypthima sakra Moore, 1857 – Himalayan Five-ring

The species may be divided into the following subspecies:

- Ypthima sakra sakra - Sikkim, Bhutan
- Ypthima sakra austeni (Moore, 1893) - Assam, northern Burma, south-eastern Tibet (Yigong), Gooligonshan Mts.
- Ypthima sakra nujiangensis Huang, 2001 - south-eastern Tibet
- Ypthima sakra leechi Forster, 1948 - Sichuan
- Ypthima sakra matinia Fruhstorfer, 1911 - north-western India

== Description ==
Ypthima sakra has a wingspan of about 25 millimetres (0.98 in). The upperside of the forewings shows one ocellus, while hindwings have three ocelli. The underside is yellow, covered with short narrow dark brown striae (stripes). The underside of the forewings has one ocellus, while hindwings has two geminated (paired) anterior ocelli and three single posterior ocelli. Larva feeds on Gramineae.

== Distribution and habitat ==
This species can be found in Bhutan, Myanmar, Tibet and north-western India. The habitat consists of wet grasslands and forest clearings and margins in submontane and montane areas.
