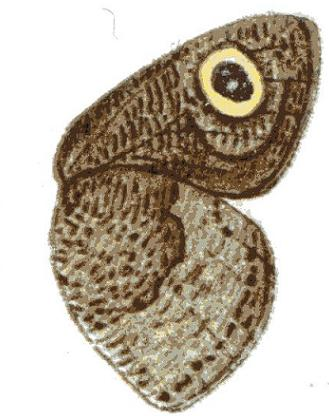

Scientific classification
- Domain: Eukaryota
- Kingdom: Animalia
- Phylum: Arthropoda
- Class: Insecta
- Order: Lepidoptera
- Family: Nymphalidae
- Genus: Ypthima
- Species: Y. granulosa

Binomial name
- Ypthima granulosa Butler, 1883

Synonyms
- Ypthima asterope ab. binucholata Strand, 1909; Ypthima asterope ab. inocellata Strand, 1909; Ypthima asterope ab. triocellata Strand, 1909; Ypthima asterope ab. biocellata Strand, 1909; Ypthima asterope ab. biocelligera Strand, 1909; Ypthima asterope ab. interrupta Strand, 1909; Ypthima asterope ab. uniocellata Strand, 1909; Ypthima cataractae van Son, 1955

= Ypthima granulosa =

Granular ringlet

Species of butterfly

Ypthima granulosa, the granular ringlet, is a butterfly of the family Nymphalidae. It is found in Mozambique and eastern Africa, south to extreme northern South Africa.

The wingspan is 32–36 mm for males and 34–38 mm for females. Adults are on wing year-round with peak in early summer and autumn in southern Africa.

The larvae probably feed on Poaceae grasses.
