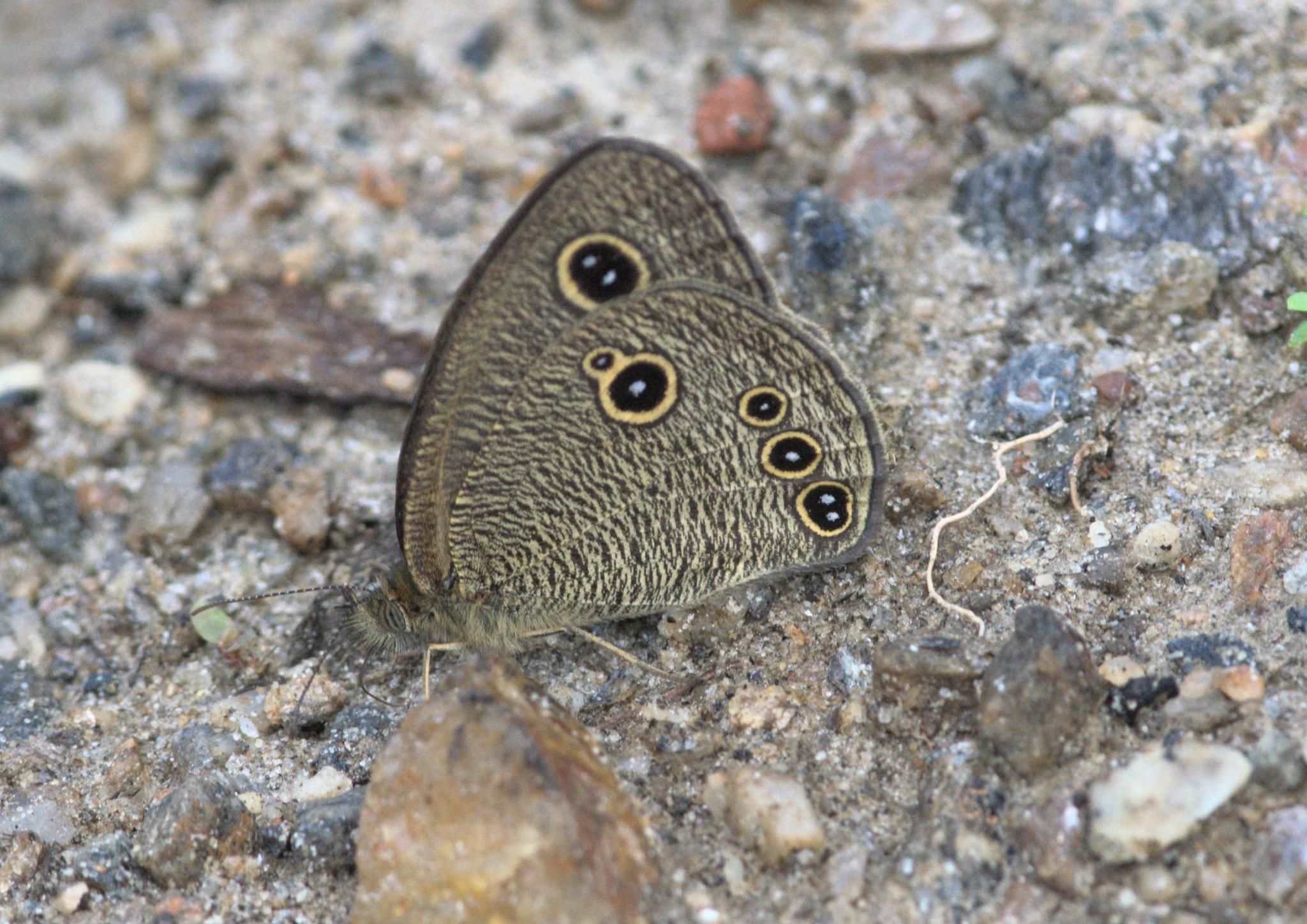

Scientific classification
- Domain: Eukaryota
- Kingdom: Animalia
- Phylum: Arthropoda
- Class: Insecta
- Order: Lepidoptera
- Family: Nymphalidae
- Genus: Ypthima
- Species: Y. nikaea

Binomial name
- Ypthima nikaea Moore, [1875]

= Ypthima nikaea =

Moore’s Fivering

Asian species of butterfly

Ypthima nikaea, the Moore's fivering, is a species of Satyrinae butterfly found in Asia.
