= Ypthima vuattouxi =

Scientific classification
- Kingdom: Animalia
- Phylum: Arthropoda
- Class: Insecta
- Order: Lepidoptera
- Family: Nymphalidae
- Genus: Ypthima
- Species: Y. vuattouxi

Binomial name
- Ypthima vuattouxi Kielland, 1982

Species of butterfly

Ypthima vuattouxi, or Vuattoux's ringlet, is a butterfly in the family Nymphalidae. It is found in Senegal, the Gambia, Ivory Coast, Ghana, Nigeria and Cameroon. The habitat consists of guinea savanna.
