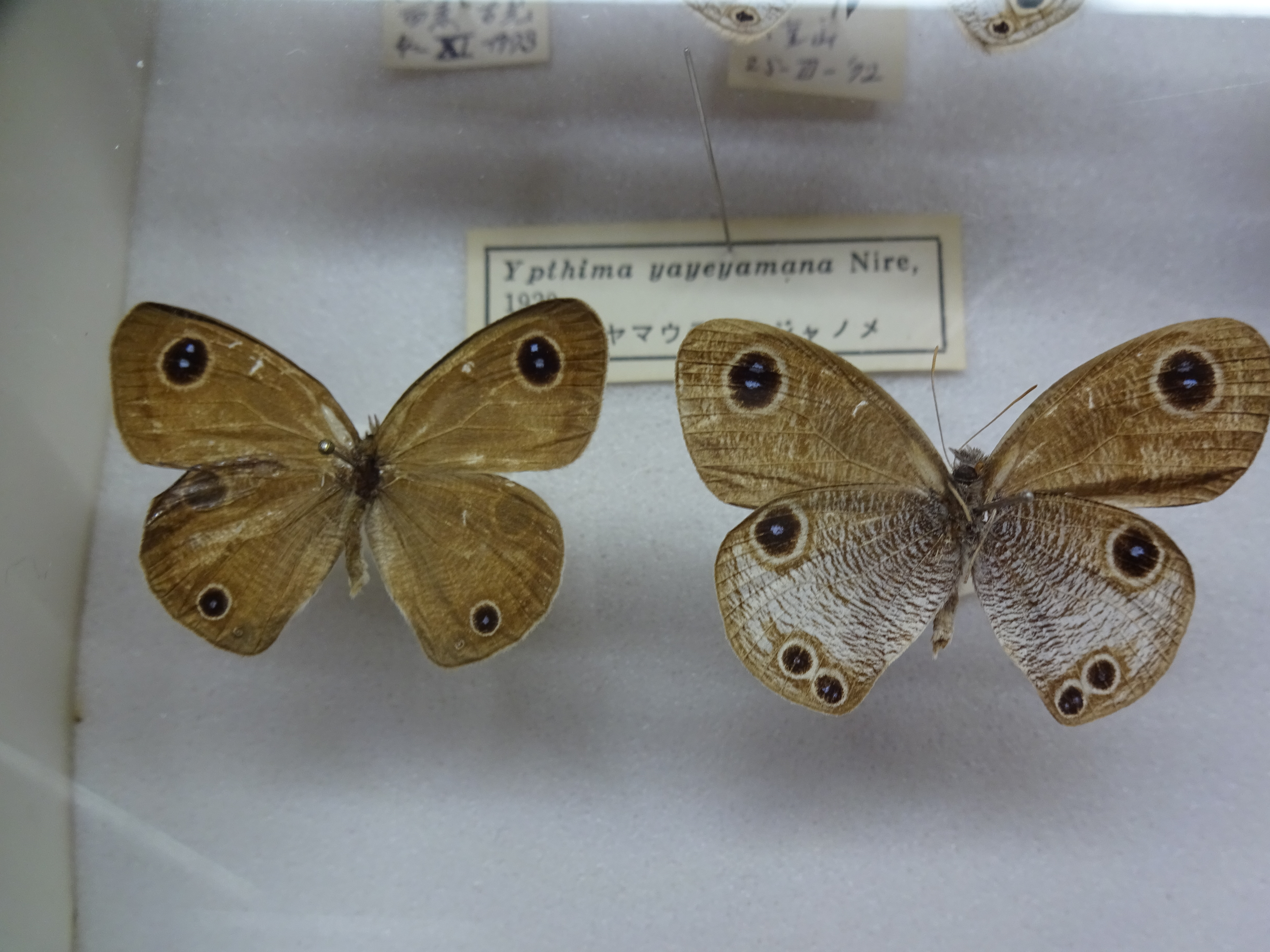

Scientific classification
- Kingdom: Animalia
- Phylum: Arthropoda
- Class: Insecta
- Order: Lepidoptera
- Family: Nymphalidae
- Genus: Ypthima
- Species: Y. yayeyamana

Binomial name
- Ypthima yayeyamana Nire, 1920

= Ypthima yayeyamana =

Species of butterfly

Ypthima yayeyamana is a butterfly in the family Nymphalidae (subfamily Satyrinae). It is endemic to Japan.
