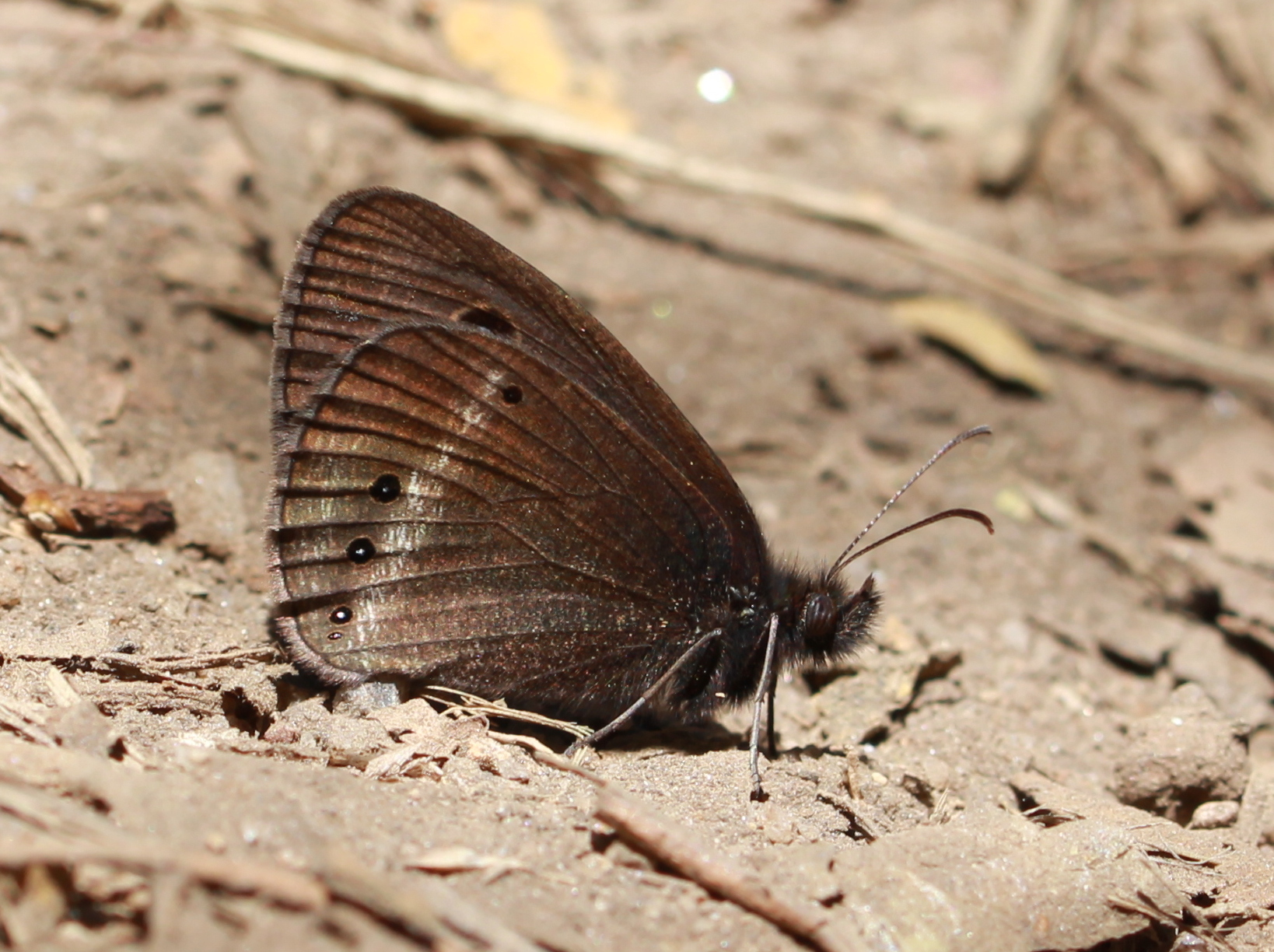

Scientific classification
- Domain: Eukaryota
- Kingdom: Animalia
- Phylum: Arthropoda
- Class: Insecta
- Order: Lepidoptera
- Family: Nymphalidae
- Genus: Ypthima
- Species: Y. ypthimoides

Binomial name
- Ypthima ypthimoides Moore, 1881

= Ypthima ypthimoides =

Palni fourring

Species of butterfly

Ypthima ypthimoides, the Palni fourring, is a species of Satyrinae butterfly found in south India.
