= Ypthima rhodesiana =

Scientific classification
- Kingdom: Animalia
- Phylum: Arthropoda
- Class: Insecta
- Order: Lepidoptera
- Family: Nymphalidae
- Genus: Ypthima
- Species: Y. rhodesiana

Binomial name
- Ypthima rhodesiana Carcasson, 1961

Species of butterfly

Ypthima rhodesiana, the pale ringlet or Zambian ringlet, is a butterfly in the family Nymphalidae found in Africa.

It is found along the coast of Kenya and in the southern part of the Democratic Republic of the Congo, central and western Tanzania, Zambia, and northern Zimbabwe.

The habitat consists of Brachystegia woodland and wooded savanna.
