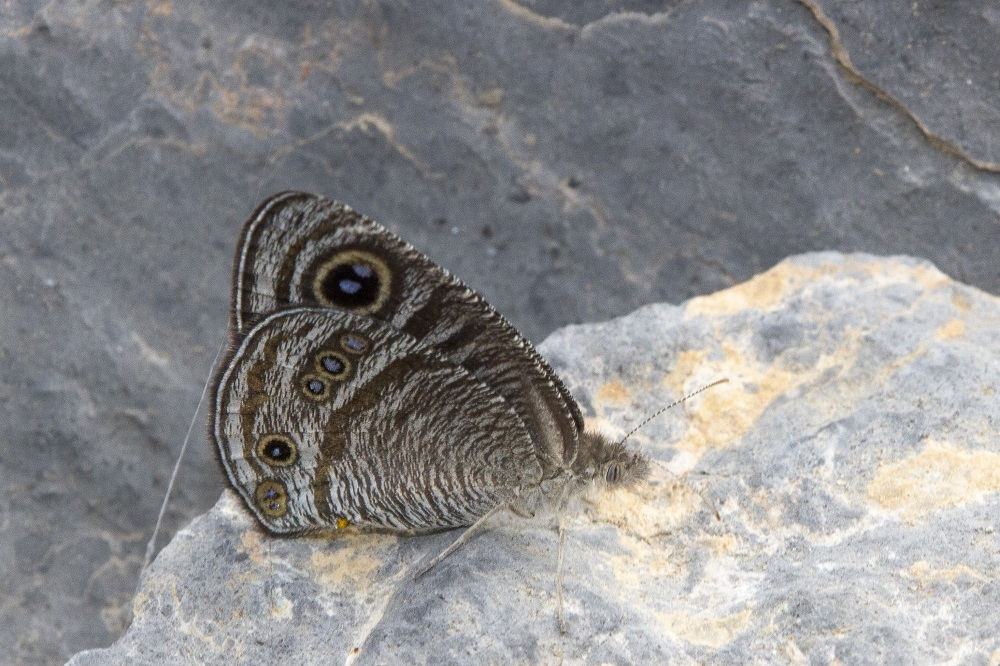

Scientific classification
- Kingdom: Animalia
- Phylum: Arthropoda
- Class: Insecta
- Order: Lepidoptera
- Family: Nymphalidae
- Genus: Ypthima
- Species: Y. bolanica

Binomial name
- Ypthima bolanica Marshall, 1883

= Ypthima bolanica =

Species of butterfly

Ypthima bolanica, the desert fourring, is a butterfly in the family Nymphalidae. It is found in Pakistan and northern Oman.
