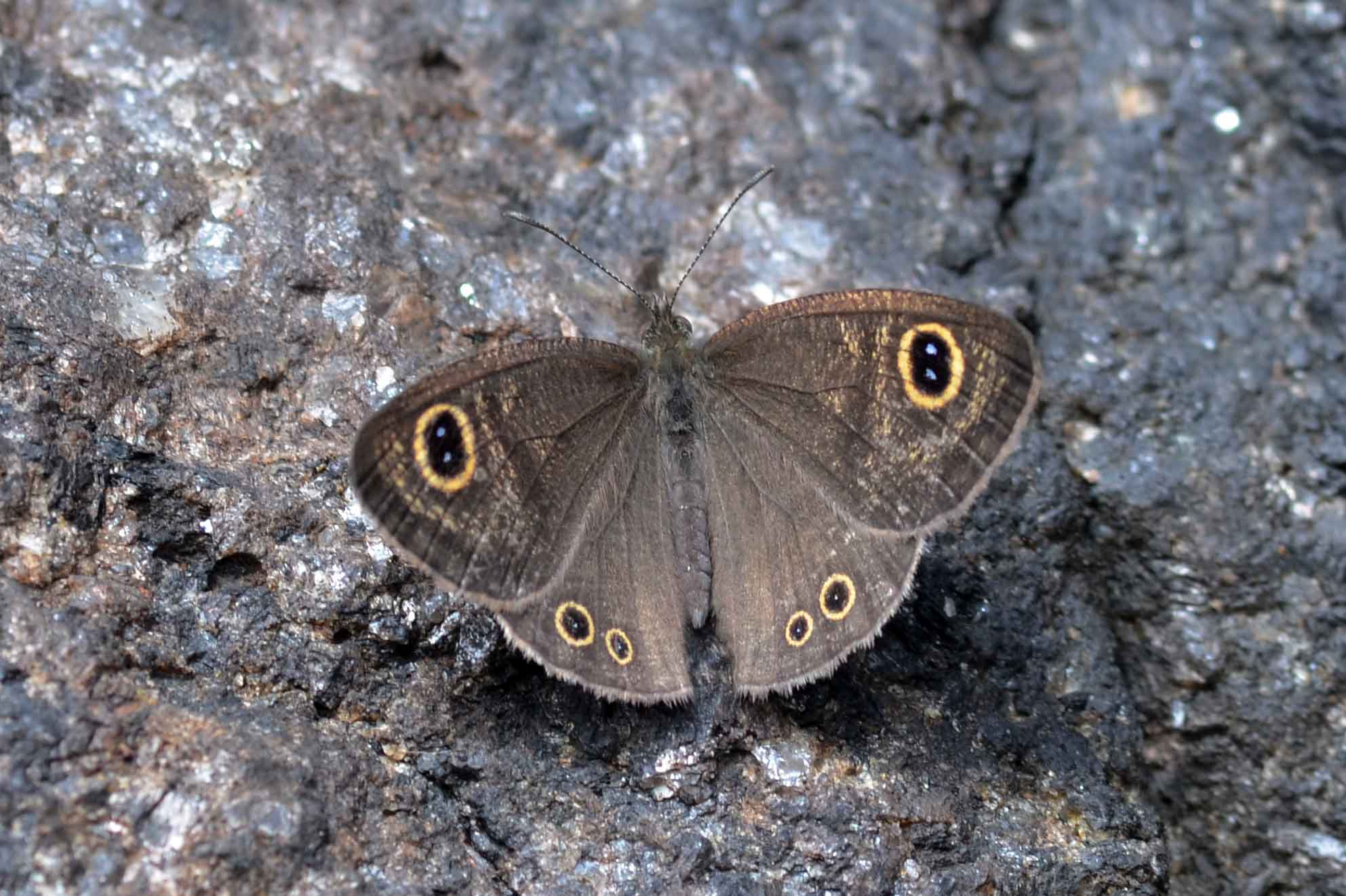

Scientific classification
- Domain: Eukaryota
- Kingdom: Animalia
- Phylum: Arthropoda
- Class: Insecta
- Order: Lepidoptera
- Family: Nymphalidae
- Genus: Ypthima
- Species: Y. chenu

Binomial name
- Ypthima chenu (Guérin-Méneville, 1843)

Synonyms
- Ypthima chenui

= Ypthima chenu =

Nilgiri fourring

Species of butterfly

Ypthima chenu, the Nilgiri fourring, is a species of Satyrinae butterfly found in south India.

== Description ==
Charles Thomas Bingham (1905) gives a detailed description as follows:

Upperside van dyke-brown. Fore wing with the usual preapical, bipupilled, yellow-ringed, large ocellus, and a more or less obscure transverse subterminal fascia. Hind wing with two small submedian unipupilled black, ocelli; no indications of a tornal ocellus. Underside : fore wing ground-colour dusky greyish brown, covered with short transverse brown striae, very prominent discal and subterminal broad transverse dark brown posteriorly convergent fasciae; the subterminal fascia bordered with whitish on both sides, and a preapical ocellus as on upperside. Hind wing : ground-colour white, with striae as on the fore wing; subbasal, discal and subterminal broad transverse brown fasciae, also one apical and three postdiscal, laterally elongate, ocelli in a curve. Antennae, head, thorax and abdomen dull greyish brown; abdomen paler beneath. Male without any secondary sex-mark.In the dry-season form the fasciae on the underside of hind wing are still more prominent, the ocelli smaller.

Exp. ♂ ♀ 44-50 mm. (1.73-1.98").

Habitat. S. India, the Nilgiri and Anaimalai Hills.

— Bingham

== Gallery ==
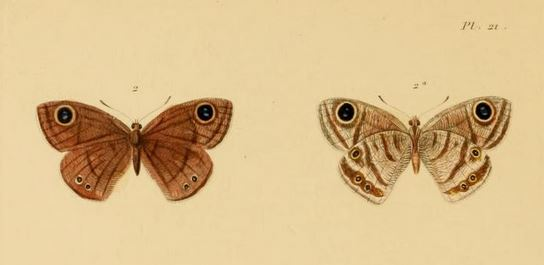
Illustration
