= Ypthima diplommata =

Scientific classification
- Kingdom: Animalia
- Phylum: Arthropoda
- Class: Insecta
- Order: Lepidoptera
- Family: Nymphalidae
- Genus: Ypthima
- Species: Y. diplommata

Binomial name
- Ypthima diplommata Overlaet, 1954

Species of butterfly

Ypthima diplommata is a butterfly in the family Nymphalidae. It is found in the Democratic Republic of the Congo (Lualaba) and western Zambia.
