= Ypthima recta =

Scientific classification
- Kingdom: Animalia
- Phylum: Arthropoda
- Class: Insecta
- Order: Lepidoptera
- Family: Nymphalidae
- Genus: Ypthima
- Species: Y. recta

Binomial name
- Ypthima recta Overlaet, 1955

Species of butterfly

Ypthima recta is a butterfly in the family Nymphalidae. It is found in the Democratic Republic of the Congo, Angola, northern Uganda, Rwanda, Burundi, Tanzania, western Kenya, and Zambia. The habitat consists of grassy areas at forest margins and along roads in the forest.

The larvae feed on Poaceae species.
