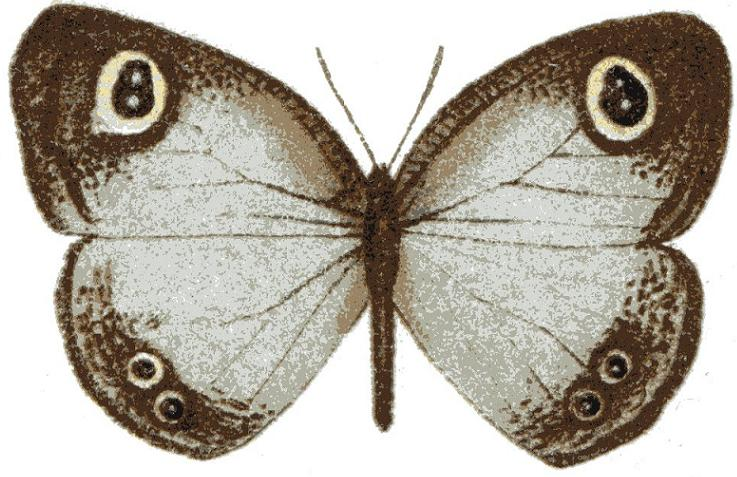

Scientific classification
- Kingdom: Animalia
- Phylum: Arthropoda
- Class: Insecta
- Order: Lepidoptera
- Family: Nymphalidae
- Genus: Ypthima
- Species: Y. albida

Binomial name
- Ypthima albida Butler, 1888

Synonyms
- Ypthima albida argentata Bartel, 1905; Ypthima albida ab. conradsi Strand, 1909; Ypthima albida ab. argentoides Strand, 1914; Ypthima albida uniformis ab. impunctata Dufrane, 1945; Ypthima albida uniformis ab. pseudalbida Dufrane, 1945

= Ypthima albida =

Species of butterfly

Ypthima albida, the silver ringlet or silvery ringlet, is a butterfly in the family Nymphalidae. It is found in Nigeria, Cameroon, Sudan, the Democratic Republic of the Congo, Uganda, Rwanda, Burundi, Kenya and Tanzania. Its habitat consists of wet grasslands and forest clearings and margins in submontane and montane areas.

== Subspecies ==
The species may be divided into the following subspecies:

- Ypthima albida albida (southern Sudan, eastern Democratic Republic of the Congo, Uganda, Rwanda, Burundi, western Kenya, north-western Tanzania)
- Ypthima albida occidentalis Bartel, 1905 (eastern Nigeria, highlands of Cameroon)
- Ypthima albida uniformis Bartel, 1905 (southern Democratic Republic of the Congo)
