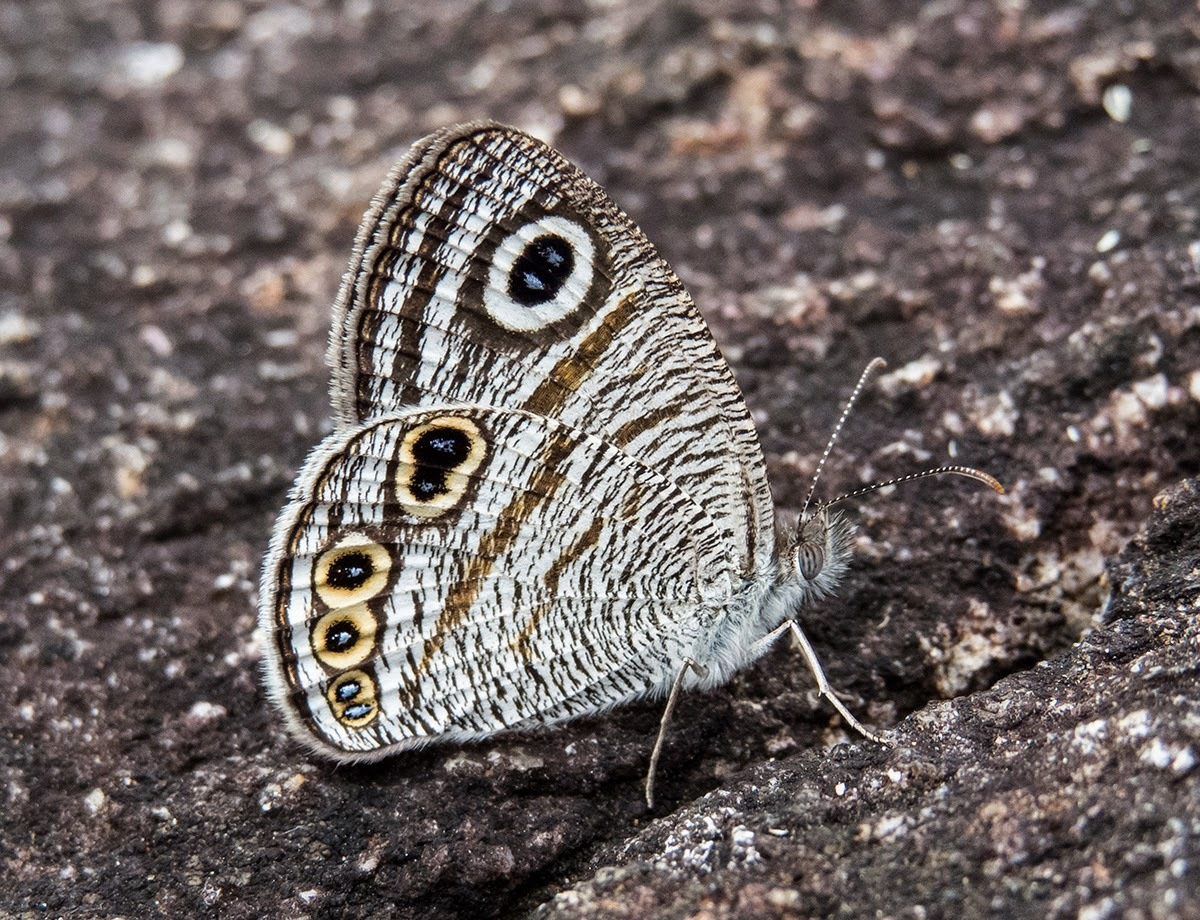

Scientific classification
- Domain: Eukaryota
- Kingdom: Animalia
- Phylum: Arthropoda
- Class: Insecta
- Order: Lepidoptera
- Family: Nymphalidae
- Genus: Ypthima
- Species: Y. striata

Binomial name
- Ypthima striata Hampson, 1888

= Ypthima striata =

Nilgiri jewel fourring

Species of butterfly

Ypthima striata, the Nilgiri jewel fourring or striated fivering, is a species of Satyrinae butterfly found in south India.

== Description ==
George Hampson (1889) gives a detailed description as follows:

Ypthima striata, n. sp.

Habitat : southern slopes of the Nilgiris, 2000 - 4000 ft. Expanse : 1'5 inches.

Wet-season form: Description : Male. Upperside, both wings uniform dark brown. Forewing with a distinct bipupilled black ocellus outlined with yellowish- brown. Hindwing with two ocelli faintly pupilled and with yellow iris, situated between the median nervules. Underside, both wings white with numerous distinct brown striae. Forewing with one bipupilled ocellus larger and brighter than on the upperside; crossed by two brown fascias, one submarginal, one discal, nearly meeting at the hinder angle. Hindwing with a double ocellus on a short brown fascia near the apex, and three linearly disposed towards the anal angle, the one nearest it bipupilled, these three ocelli situated on a brown fascia, and all the ocelli large and distinct; a fascia crossing the wing beyond the cell from the costa to the inner margin, and a less distinct one near the base of the wing. Female; only differs in being rather larger and paler than the male. Male; with no trace of the patch of dense scales on the upperside of the forewing.

Dry-season form: Male. Upperside, forewing with a slight patch of dense scales on the median nervure; with a very small and indistinct ocellus. Under- side, both wings with the fasciae indistinct and the striae smaller and denser. Hindiving, with the ocelli much smaller than in the wet-season form, the double ocellus near the apex separated into two ocelli, the upper one minute, and the bipupilled ocellus near the anal angle forming a double ocellus. Female. Upperside, forewing differs from the male in having a large and distinct black bipupilled ocellus with yellow iris. Underside, both wings with the fasciae more prominent, but not as much so as in the wet-season form.

The wet-season form occurs commonly at about 3000 ft. on the

southern slopes of the Nilgiris in August, and the dry-season form in December and January.

— Hampson
