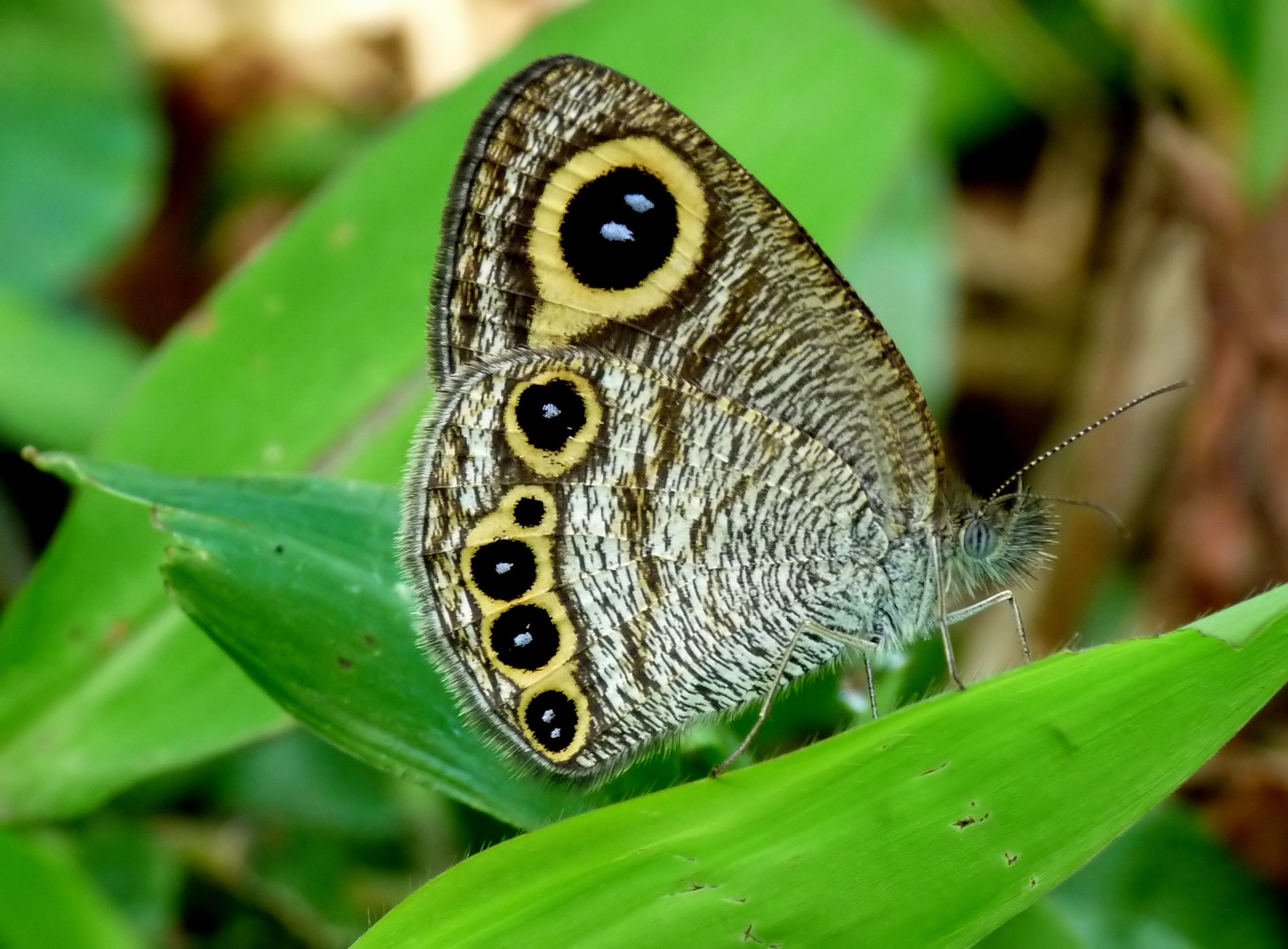

Scientific classification
- Kingdom: Animalia
- Phylum: Arthropoda
- Clade: Pancrustacea
- Class: Insecta
- Order: Lepidoptera
- Family: Nymphalidae
- Genus: Ypthima
- Species: Y. huebneri

Binomial name
- Ypthima huebneri Kirby, 1871

= Ypthima huebneri =

Common fourring

Species of butterfly

Ypthima huebneri, the common fourring, is a species of Satyrinae butterfly found in Asia.

== Description ==
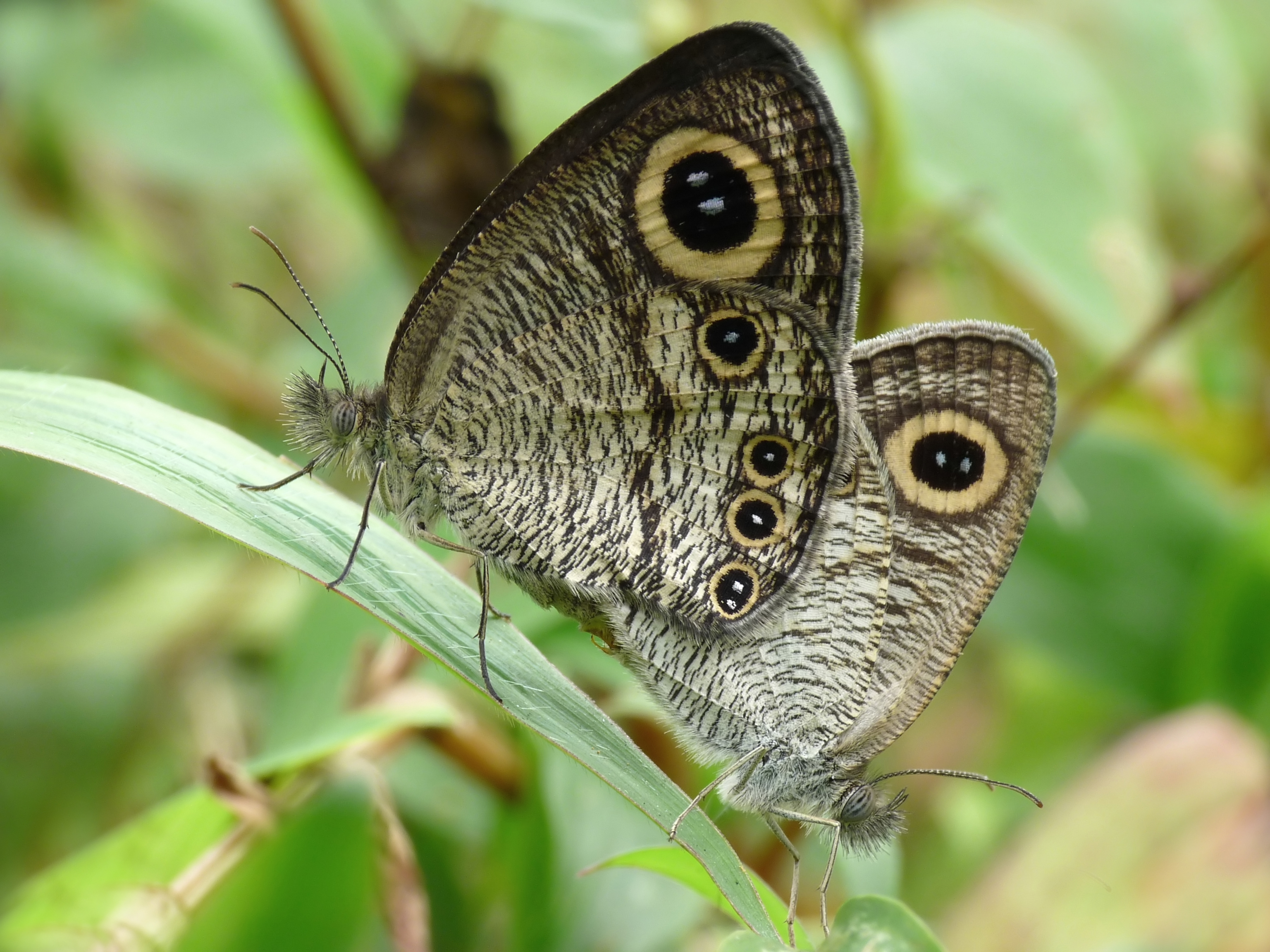
Mating

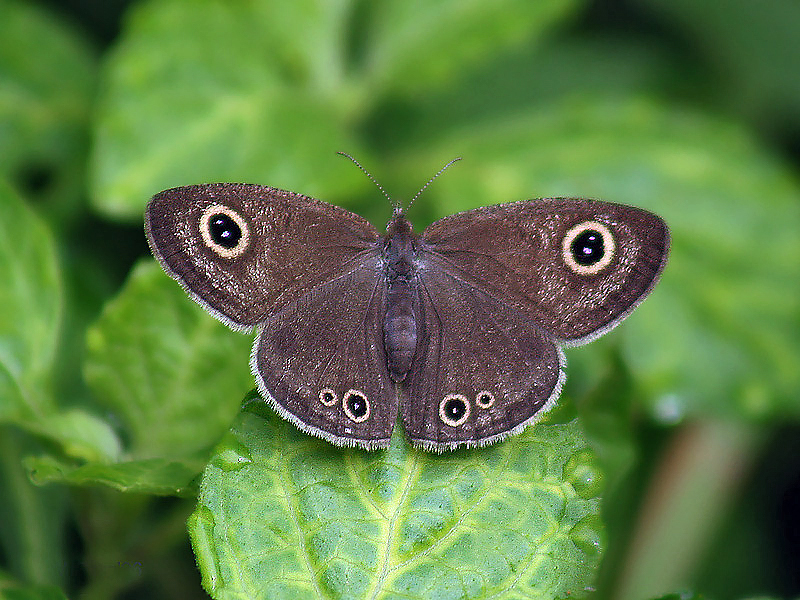
Wet-season form at Kolkata, West Bengal, India

=== Wet-season form ===
Upperside greyish brown. Forewing with the usual comparatively large, bi-pupilled, yellow-ringed, black preapical ocellus. Hindwing usually with two, sometimes with three, very rarely without any, smaller similar uni-pupilled postdiscal ocelli. Underside greyish white, not very densely covered with transverse short brown striae. Forewing with the preapical ocellus as on the upperside, obscure discal and subterminal dull brown transverse fasciae and a narrow brown ring round the ocellus diffusely produced posteriorly. Hindwing with one apical and typically three postdiscal posterior ocelli placed in a curve; traces of transverse brown discal and subterminal fasciae in most specimens. Antenna, head, thorax and abdomen greyish brown, the abdomen paler beneath. Male without secondary sex-mark.

=== Dry-season form ===
Similar, somewhat paler on both upper and under sides; the discal and subterminal transverse fasciae more pronounced; the ocelli on the underside of the hindwing minute or absent.

Adults have a wingspan of 40–43 mm.

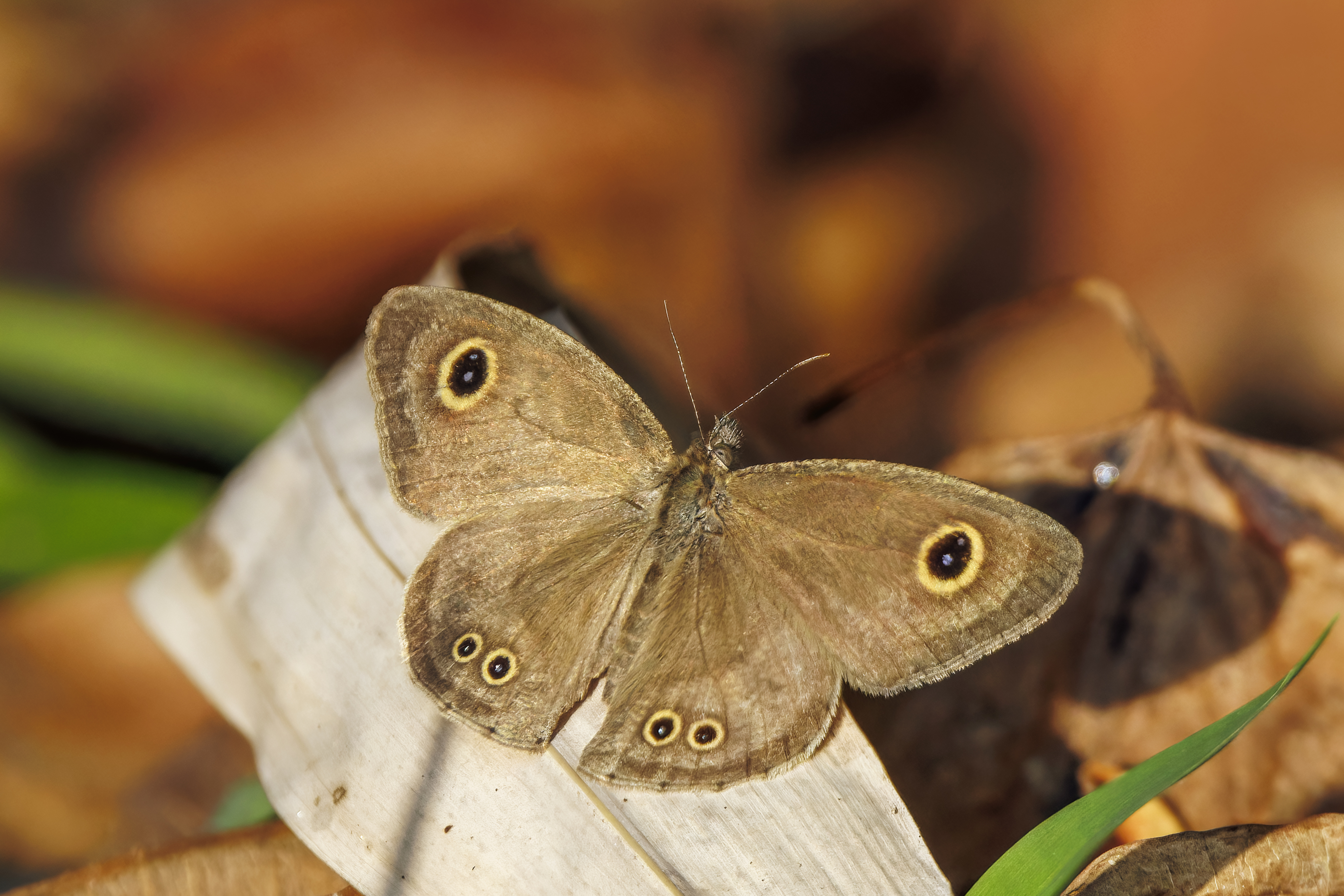
dry season form, Loas

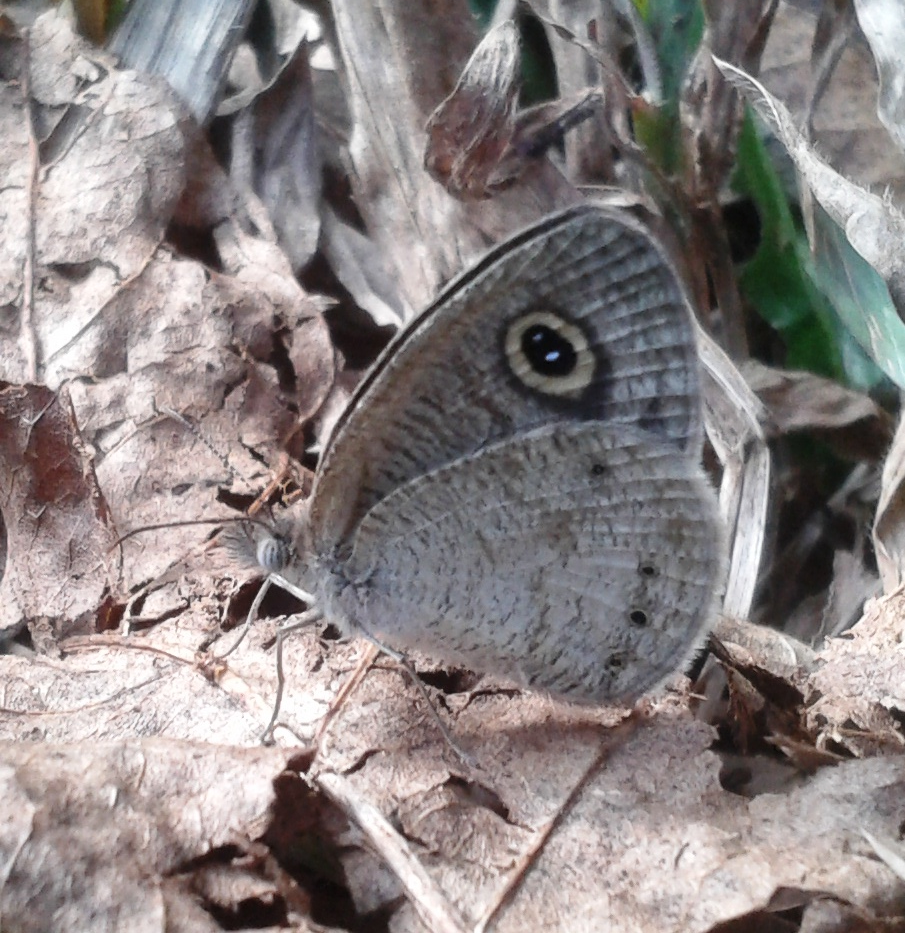
Dryseason form at Coorg

=== Racial variation ===
Var. jocularia, Swinhoe, is the pale form from Western India "said by Messrs. Elwes and Edwards to be nearest to kashmira, Moore." (quoted in Bingham)

Race kashmira, Moore, differs from the typical form in the darker and more uniform colour of the upperside, in the ground colour on the underside being dull brownish not white, and the wings non-fasciated in most specimens, or with only the sub-terminal fascia on the forewing. The clasp in the male differs, however, considerably from that of Y. huebneri.

Wingspan of 33–39 mm. Found in the north-western Himalayas; Kashmir; southern India, Mysore and the Anaimalai Hills (fide Elwes quoted in Bingham).

Race ceylonica: Upperside Vandyke brown to dark sepia brown. Forewing uniform, with the usual single preapical ocellus. Hindwing: posterior half, sometimes less than half, pure white, with two or three small posterior ocelli, a lunular incomplete subterminal and an even slender terminal brown line. Underside white with somewhat sparse, short, delicate, fine transverse brown stride, getting denser towards the apex of the forewing. Forewing with the ocellus, a brown ring surrounding it very broad and very broadly and diffusely produced downwards, discal and subterminal transverse fascial obscure. Hindwing with four ocelli in a curve, the anal bi-pupilled; traces of a discal transverse brown fascia and of a lunular subterminal brown line. Antennae, head, thorax and abdomen brown; abdomen white beneath. Wingspan of 34–40 mm. Found in Bengal, Orissa; southern India, the Nilgiris, Travancore: Sri Lanka.

== Distribution ==
Throughout South India, Indian Himalayan Region, Nepal, Burma, Malaysia, Cambodia and Indochina.

== Life history ==
Larva. About one inch (25 mm) in length, with two divergent processes from the anal segment pointing backwards. "Colour entirely green with a dorsal line somewhat darker green, which becomes white at the fourth segment, and extends right through the crown of the head; there is also a paler green lateral line below the spiracles." (de Niceville quoted in Bingham) Host plants include Axonopus compressus.

Pupa. "Green or brown, with the head rounded, the edges of the wing-cases raised and angled anteriorly; the thorax humped and marked like the abdominal segments, with some dark brown waved lines and spots" (de Niceville quoted in Bingham)
