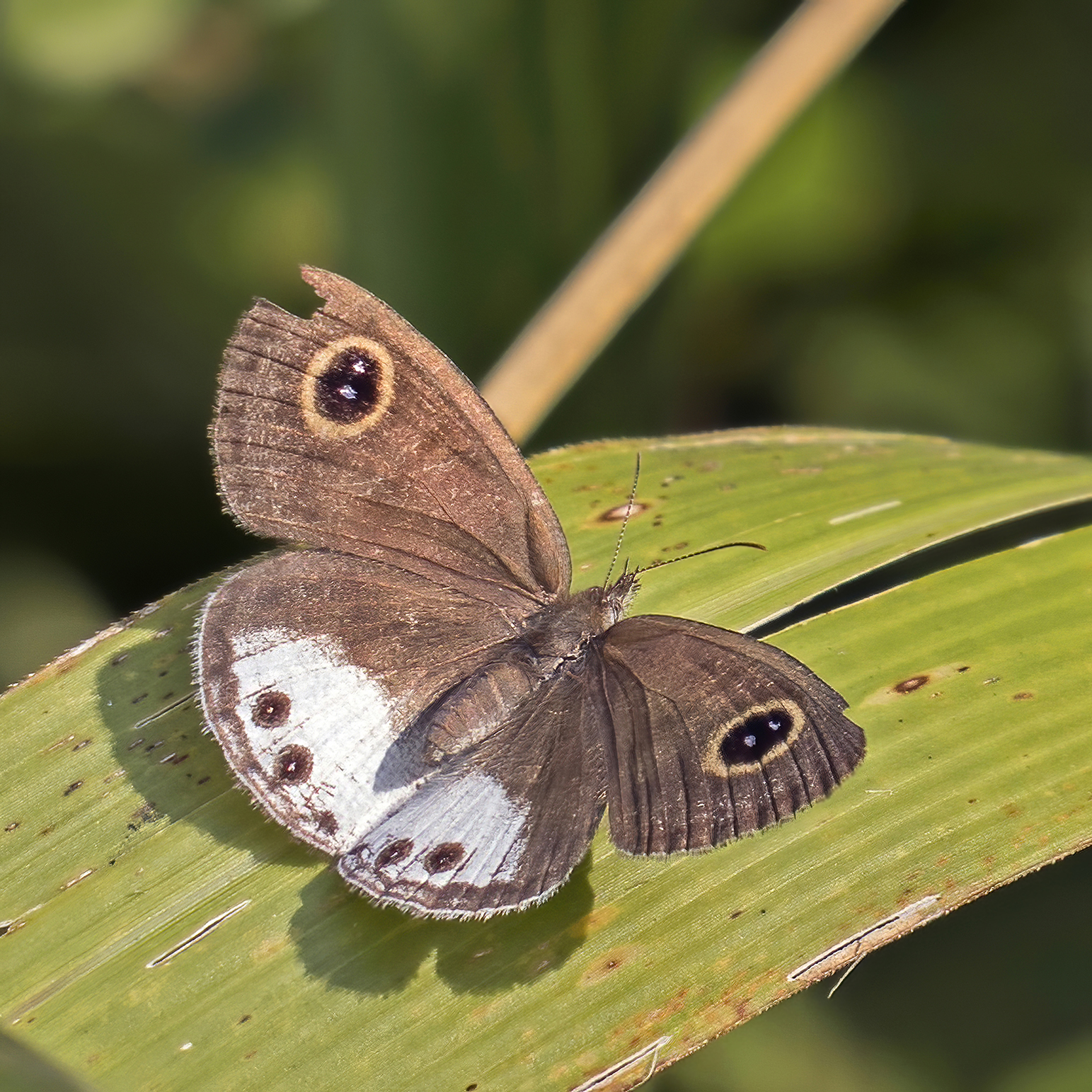
- Sri Lanka
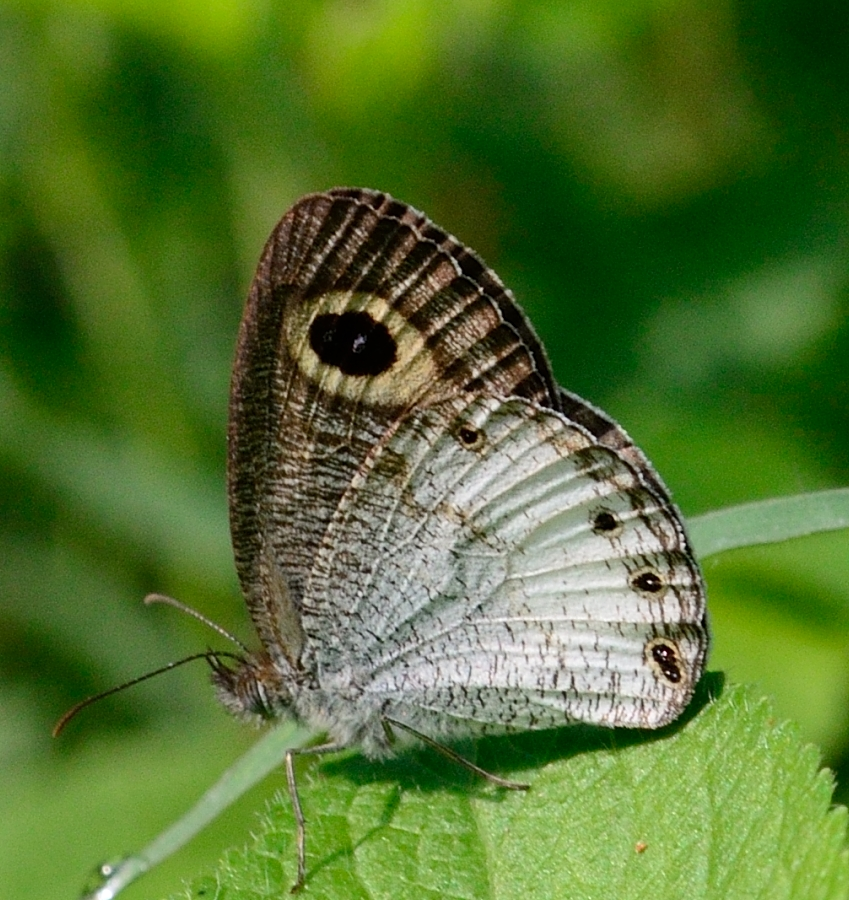
- Tamil Nadu, India

Scientific classification
- Domain: Eukaryota
- Kingdom: Animalia
- Phylum: Arthropoda
- Class: Insecta
- Order: Lepidoptera
- Family: Nymphalidae
- Genus: Ypthima
- Species: Y. ceylonica

Binomial name
- Ypthima ceylonica Hewitson, 1865

= Ypthima ceylonica =

White fourring

Species of butterfly

Ypthima ceylonica, the white fourring, is a species of Satyrinae butterfly found in Sri Lanka and India.
