= Ypthima congoana =

Scientific classification
- Kingdom: Animalia
- Phylum: Arthropoda
- Class: Insecta
- Order: Lepidoptera
- Family: Nymphalidae
- Genus: Ypthima
- Species: Y. congoana

Binomial name
- Ypthima congoana Overlaet, 1955

Synonyms
- Ypthima asterope congoana Overlaet, 1955

Species of butterfly

Ypthima congoana is a butterfly in the family Nymphalidae. It is found in the Democratic Republic of the Congo, Zambia, and possibly Angola.
