= Ypthima yatta =

Scientific classification
- Kingdom: Animalia
- Phylum: Arthropoda
- Class: Insecta
- Order: Lepidoptera
- Family: Nymphalidae
- Genus: Ypthima
- Species: Y. yatta

Binomial name
- Ypthima yatta Kielland, 1982

Species of butterfly

Ypthima yatta, the Yatta ringlet or Yatta three-ring, is a butterfly in the family Nymphalidae. It is found in south-central Ethiopia and Kenya.
