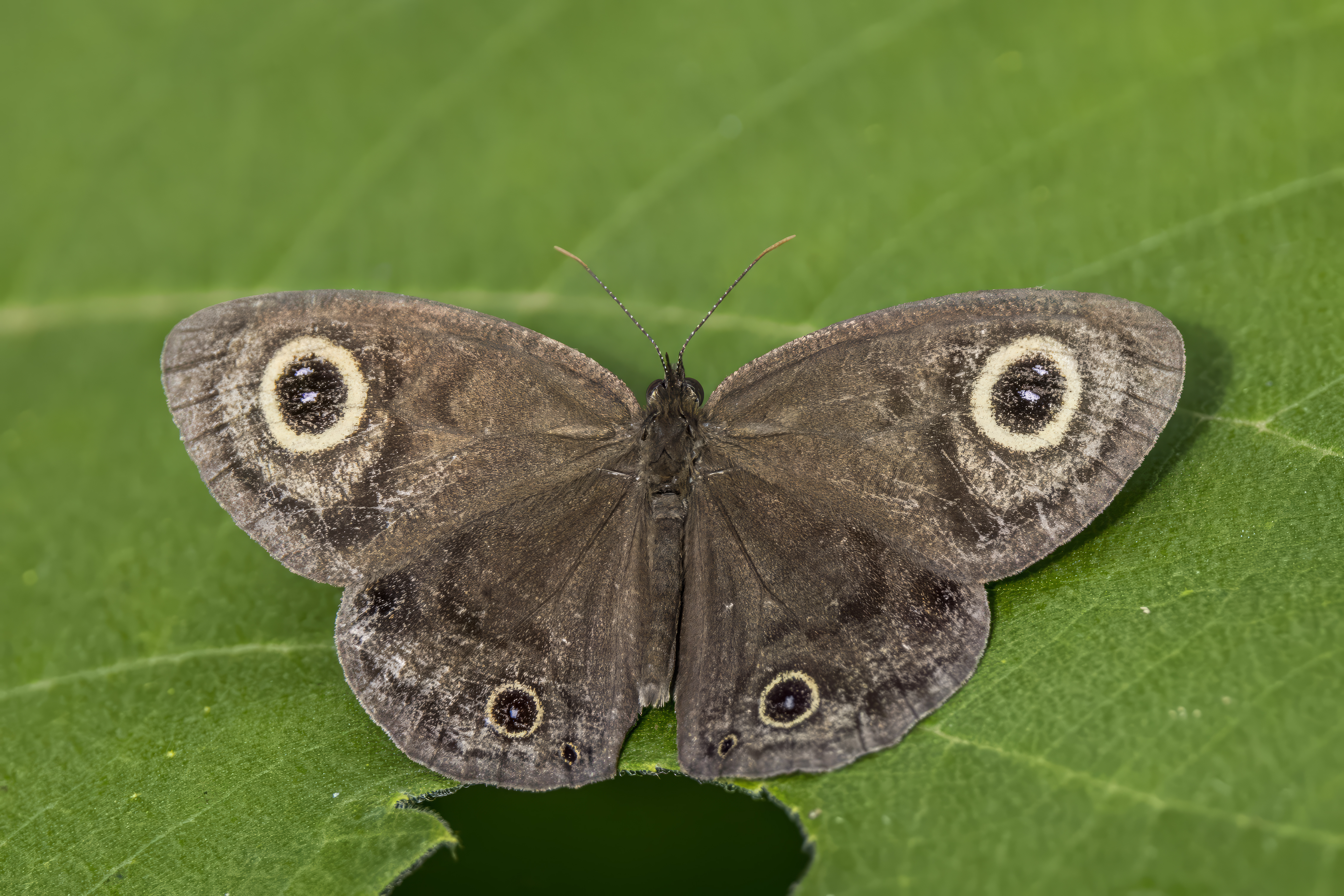

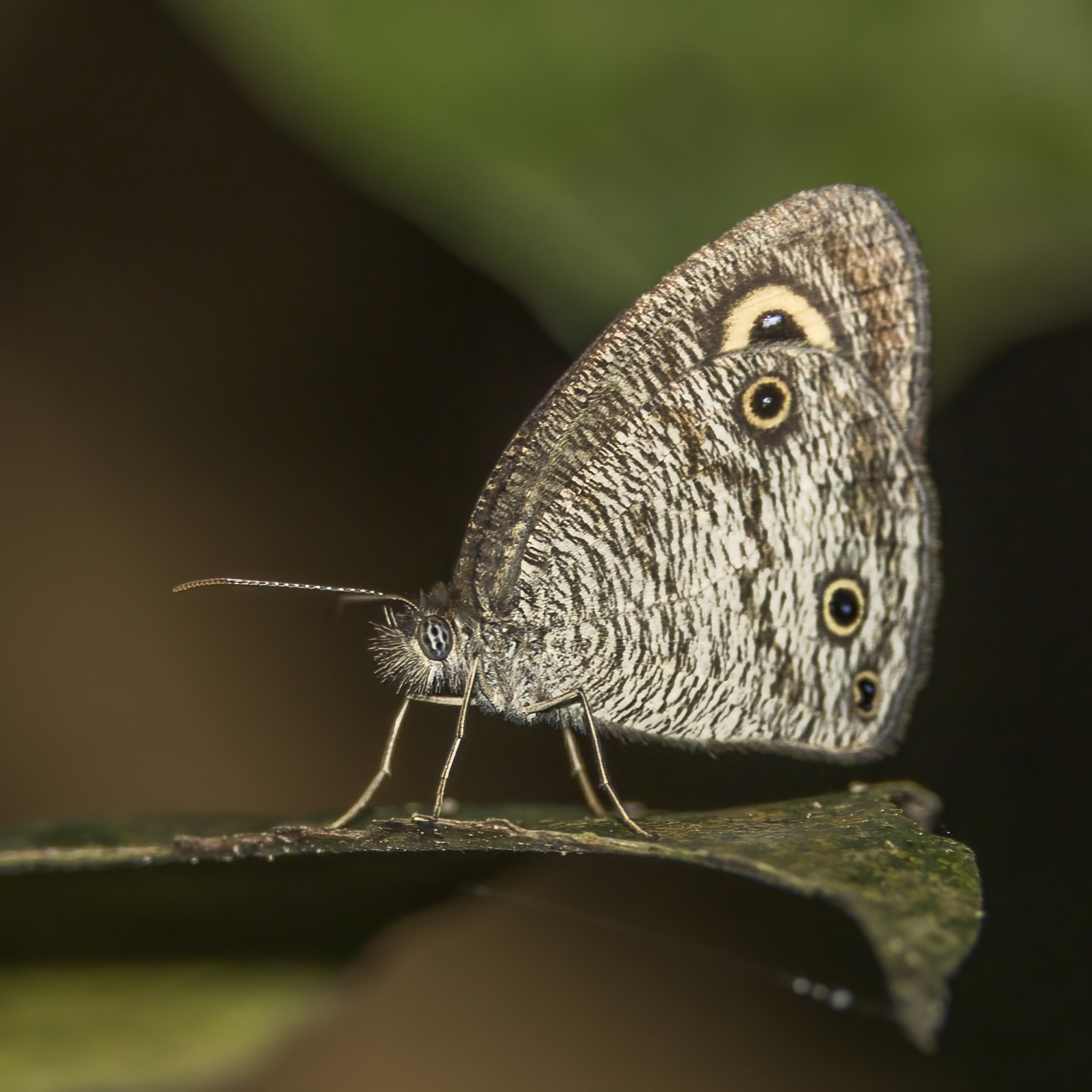
- both in Ghana

Scientific classification
- Kingdom: Animalia
- Phylum: Arthropoda
- Clade: Pancrustacea
- Class: Insecta
- Order: Lepidoptera
- Family: Nymphalidae
- Genus: Ypthima
- Species: Y. doleta

Binomial name
- Ypthima doleta Kirby, 1880

Synonyms
- List: Ypthima doleta ab. tripunctata Strand, 1909; Ypthima doleta ab. quadripunctata Strand, 1909; Ypthima doleta ab. quinquepunctata Strand, 1909; Ypthima doleta ab. septemocellata Strand, 1909; Ypthima doleta ab. strigata Strand, 1913; Ypthima doleta ab. defecta Strand, 1913; Ypthima doleta ab. asteropina Strand, 1913; Ypthima doleta ab. dschangensis Strand, 1914

= Ypthima doleta =

Species of butterfly

Ypthima doleta, the common African ringlet, is a butterfly in the family Nymphalidae. It is found in Senegal, Guinea-Bissau, Guinea, Sierra Leone, Liberia, Ivory Coast, Ghana, Togo, Benin, Nigeria, Cameroon, Gabon, the Republic of the Congo, the Central African Republic, Angola, the Democratic Republic of the Congo, southern Sudan, Uganda and north-western Tanzania. The habitat consists of humid areas, including farmland, forest margins and glades.

Torben Larsen developed a species numbering system for his 2005 publication Butterflies of West Africa. This species is #719. The 'Larsen' numbers have since been used with permission in A Sharp Eye on Butterflies of Ghana.
