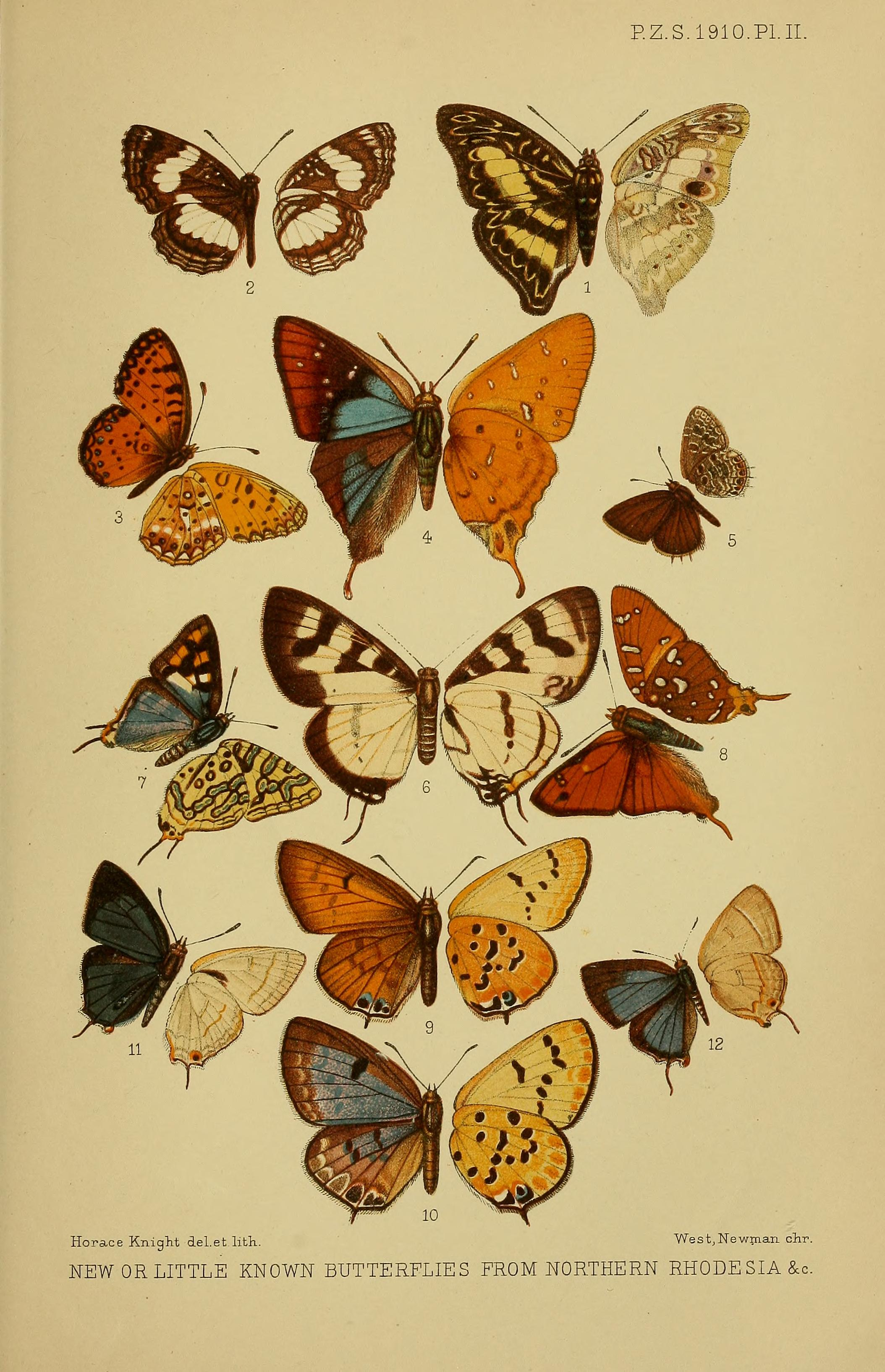
- Figure 3

Scientific classification
- Kingdom: Animalia
- Phylum: Arthropoda
- Class: Insecta
- Order: Lepidoptera
- Family: Nymphalidae
- Genus: Issoria
- Species: I. baumanni

Binomial name
- Issoria baumanni (Rebel & Rogenhofer, 1894)

Synonyms
- Argynnis baumanni Rebel & Rogenhofer, 1894; Prokuekenthaliella baumanni; Argynnis excelsior Butler, 1896; Prokuekenthaliella baumanni excelsior; Argynnis uganda Röber, 1937; Issoria uganda; Argynnis (Boloria) excelsior ab. alberici Dufrane, 1945; Brenthis excelsior katangae Neave, 1910; Prokuekenthaliella baumanni katangae; Prokuekenthaliella baumanni orientalis

= Issoria baumanni =

Species of butterfly

Issoria baumanni, Baumann's mountain fritillary, is a butterfly in the family Nymphalidae. It is found in Nigeria, Cameroon, the Democratic Republic of the Congo, Uganda, Rwanda, Burundi and Tanzania. The habitat consists of grassland, marshy areas and forest margins at high altitudes.

The larvae feed on Viola abyssinica.

== Subspecies ==
- Issoria baumanni baumanni (Burundi)
- Issoria baumanni excelsior (Butler, 1896) (Nigeria, Cameroon, Uganda, Rwanda, Burundi, Democratic Republic of the Congo: east to Kivu)
- Issoria baumanni katangae (Neave, 1910) (south-western Tanzania, northern Zambia, Democratic Republic of the Congo: Shaba, Tanganika)
- Issoria baumanni orientalis Kielland, 1990 (southern highlands of Tanzania)
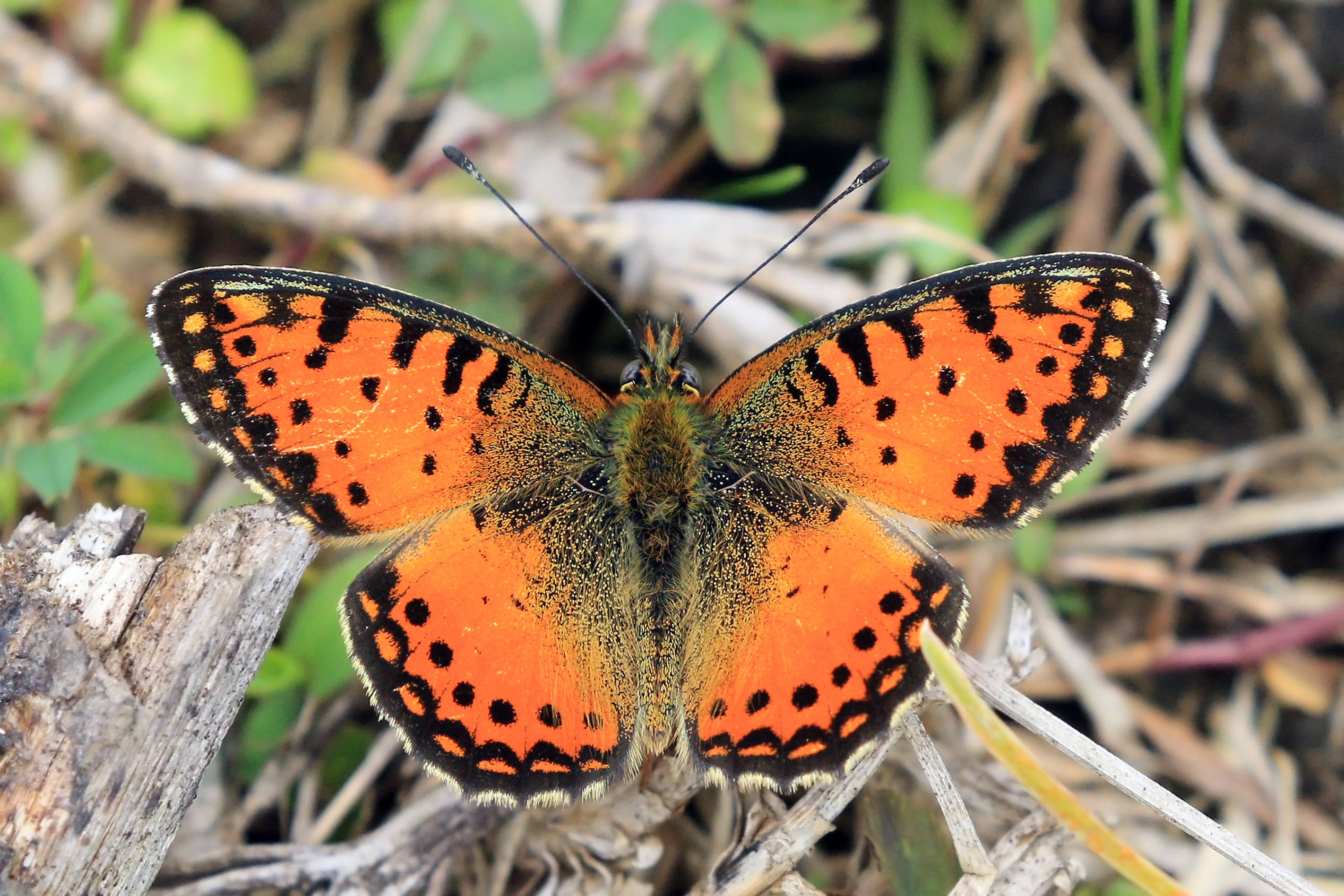
Baumann's mountain fritillary, Issoria baumanni excelsior, Volcanoes National Park, Rwanda
