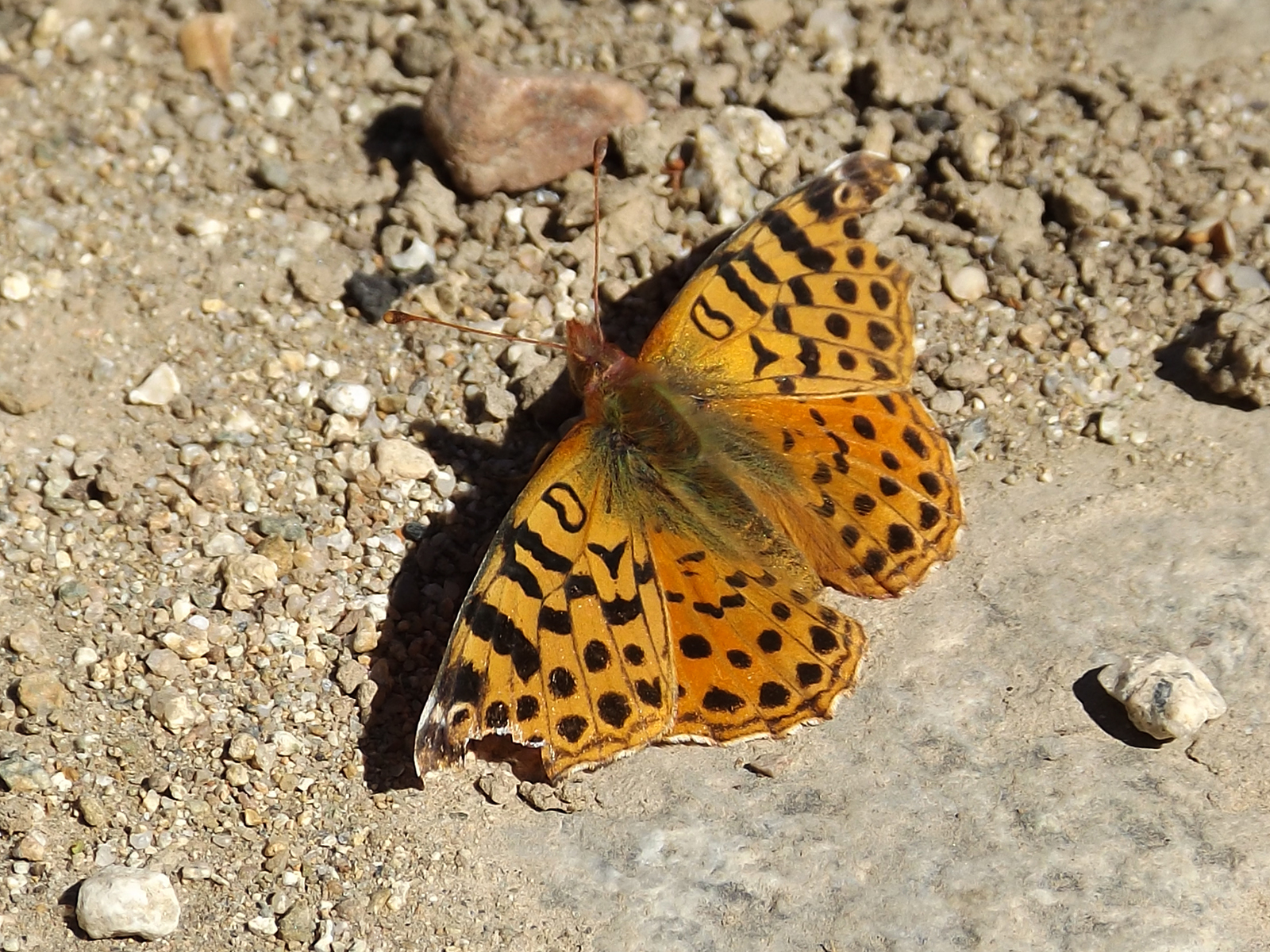

Scientific classification
- Domain: Eukaryota
- Kingdom: Animalia
- Phylum: Arthropoda
- Class: Insecta
- Order: Lepidoptera
- Family: Nymphalidae
- Genus: Yramea
- Species: Y. cytheris

Binomial name
- Yramea cytheris (Drury, [1773])

Synonyms
- Papilio cytheris Drury, [1773]; Argynnis cytheris falklandica Watkins, 1924; Argynnis cytheris siga Geyer, 1832; Argynnis anna Blanchard, 1852; Argynnis chilensis Reed, 1877; Chilargynnis cytheris subtusviola Bryk, 1944

= Yramea cytheris =

Species of butterfly

Yramea cytheris is a species of butterfly in the family Nymphalidae. It was first described by Dru Drury in 1773 from the Falkland Islands. In some systems it is included in genus Issoria.

== Description ==
Upperside: head, eyes, thorax, and abdomen dark brown. Anterior wings brown orange, with a number of small black spots thereon (not less than twenty) of various shapes and sizes. Next to the body these wings are darker and pilose (covered with fine hair). Posterior wings are the same colour as the superior, and spotted with many small black spots of different shapes dispersed all over the wings; they are also darker next to the body and hairy.

Underside: palpi reddish. Anterior wings sandy orange coloured, rather paler than the upperside. Near the tips is a white streak placed next the anterior margin, and close thereto is a cloud of a dark red. Most of the small black spots are seen on this side, but less distinctly. Posterior wings dark red, with several faint clouds. A narrow white streak, about a quarter of an inch (6 mm) in length, is placed near the middle of each of these wings; and another much shorter is placed on the anterior edge, near the upper corner. All the wings are entire.

Wingspan 1 1/4 inches (32 mm).

== Subspecies ==
- Yramea cytheris cytheris (Falkland Islands)
- Yramea cytheris siga (Geyer, 1832) (Chile, Argentina)
