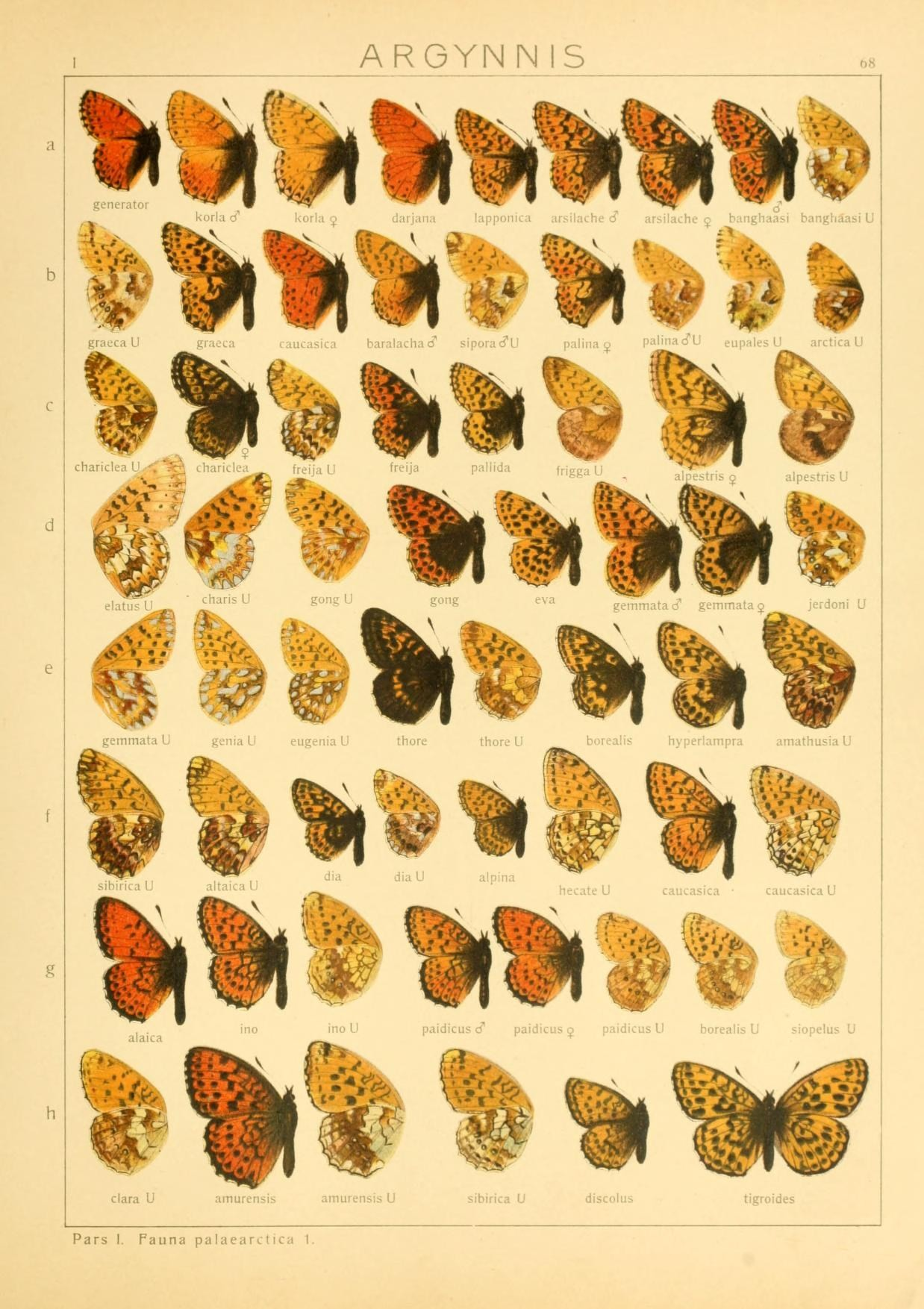
- Issoria gemmata in Seitz (d,e)

Scientific classification
- Domain: Eukaryota
- Kingdom: Animalia
- Phylum: Arthropoda
- Class: Insecta
- Order: Lepidoptera
- Family: Nymphalidae
- Genus: Issoria
- Species: I. gemmata

Binomial name
- Issoria gemmata (Butler, 1881)

Synonyms
- Argynnis gemmata Butler, 1881; Kuekenthaliella gemmata (Butler, 1881)

= Issoria gemmata =

Species of butterfly

Issoria gemmata is a small brown-chequered-with-black (fritillary) butterfly found in the Palearctic realm that belongs to the family Nymphalidae. The species was first described by Arthur Gardiner Butler in 1881. It is found in the Indian state of Sikkim and in Tibet. It is very similar to Issoria eugenia.
