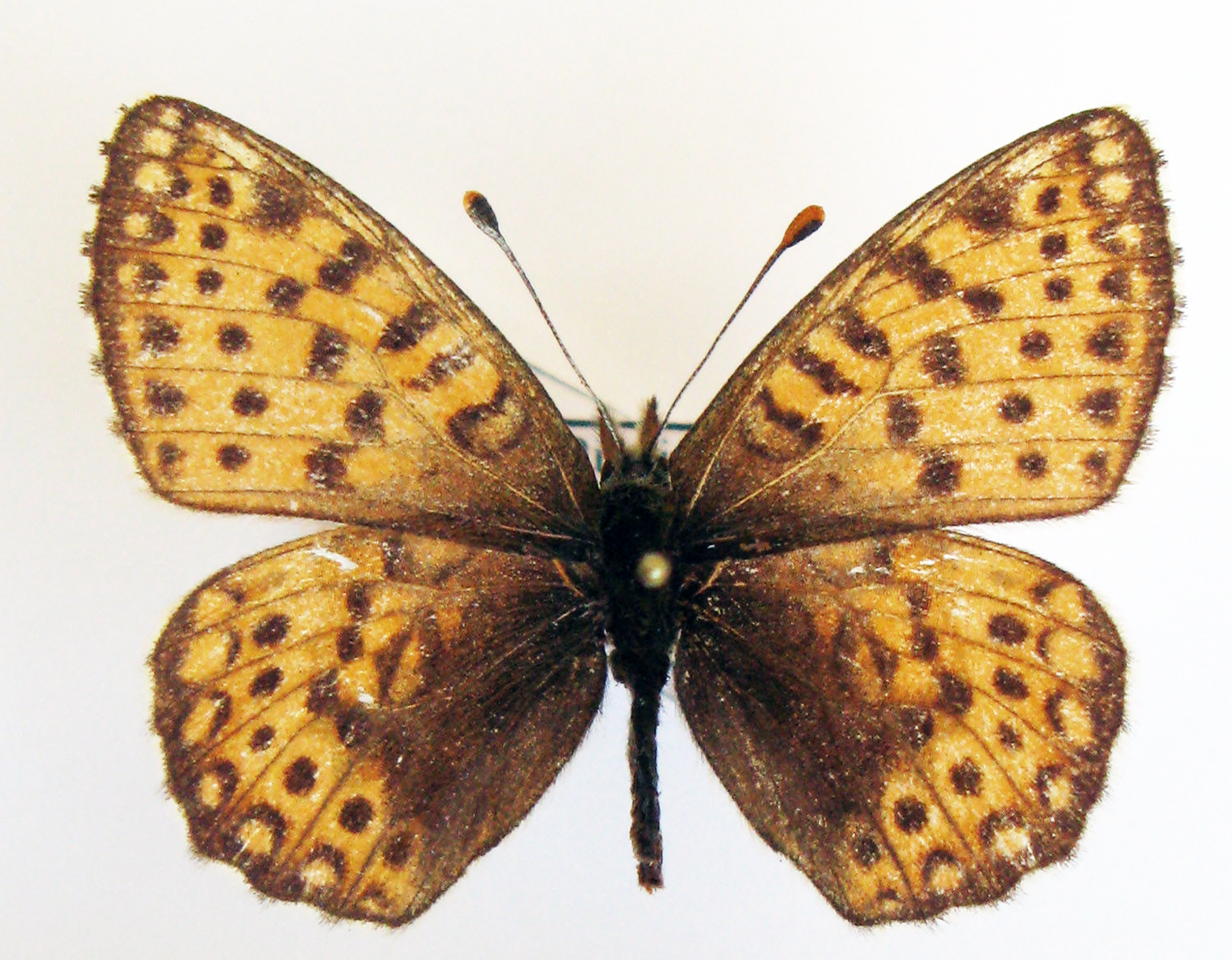

Scientific classification
- Kingdom: Animalia
- Phylum: Arthropoda
- Clade: Pancrustacea
- Class: Insecta
- Order: Lepidoptera
- Family: Nymphalidae
- Genus: Issoria
- Species: I. eugenia

Binomial name
- Issoria eugenia (Eversmann, 1847)

Synonyms
- Argynnis eugenia Eversmann, 1847; Kuekenthaliella eugenia (Eversmann, 1847)

= Issoria eugenia =

Species of butterfly

Issoria eugenia is a small butterfly found in the East Palearctic that belongs to the family Nymphalidae.

== Subspecies ==
- I. e. eugenia South Transbaikalia, Sayan
- I. e. vega (Christoph, 1889) Central Siberia, Russian Far East, Kamchatka
- I. e. montana (Bang-Haas, 1906) Altai, Sayan
- I. e. rhea (Grum-Grshimailo, 1891) Tsingai, Gansu
- I. e. genia (Fruhstorfer, 1903) Sichuan, Shaanxi
- I. e. pulchella Huang, 2001 East Tibet
- I. e. tibetana Huang, 1998 West Tibet

== Habitat ==
Occurs at elevation up to 3000 m.

== Description from Seitz ==
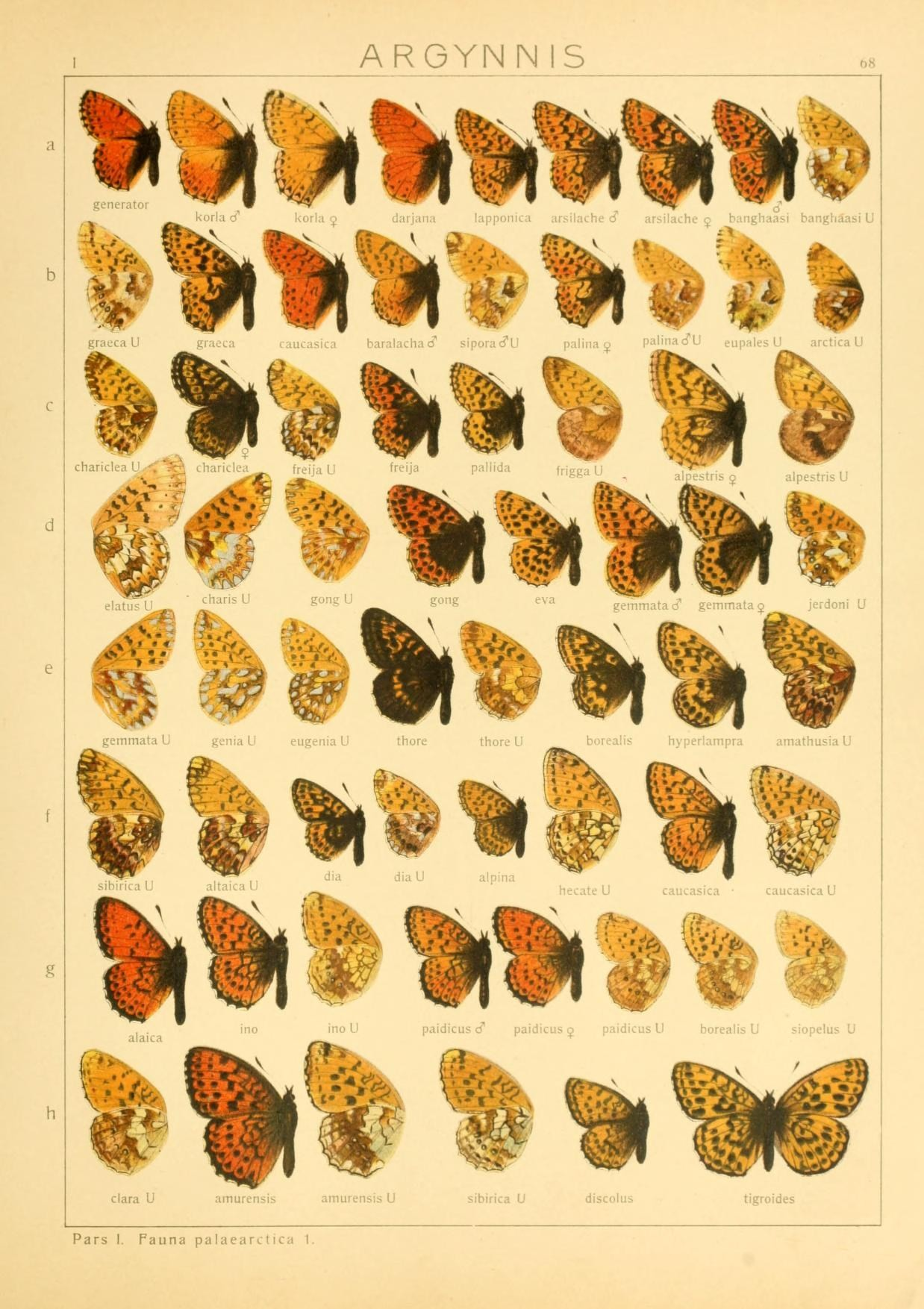
Issoria eugenia in Seitz 68e

A. eugenia Ev. (= vega Christ.) (68e) is similar to the preceding ( A. gemmata Btlr.); above with the general characteristics of the other smaller species of Argynnis; beneath like gemmata with abundant silver markings on the hindwing and in the apical area of the forewing, but the spots more rounded, the spot across the cell more tooth-like, the marginal spots not triangular but circular or ovate and a little removed from the edge. The ground-colour of the female is more greenish grey than reddish yellow. From South Siberia (Sajan, Irkutsk), Tibet (Hokow) and West China. — genia Fruhst.(68e) has the hindwing beneath paler, the silvery median spot across the cell is more produced distad, somewhat resembling in shape the same spot of gemmata. The base of both wings above is much darker (brownish green in the female) and the black markings are stronger. From West China. — rhea Gr.-Grsh. has the same long silver-spot as genia, but is brighter yellow above, the base of the wings being less dusted with black. Amdo. — montana Bang-H., from the central Altai, is paler and its markings are thinner. The female especially is lighter, and the black marginal band of the upperside is less prominent. Beneath the shorter silver-spot at once distinguished it from genia. — Little is known of the habits of this species.
