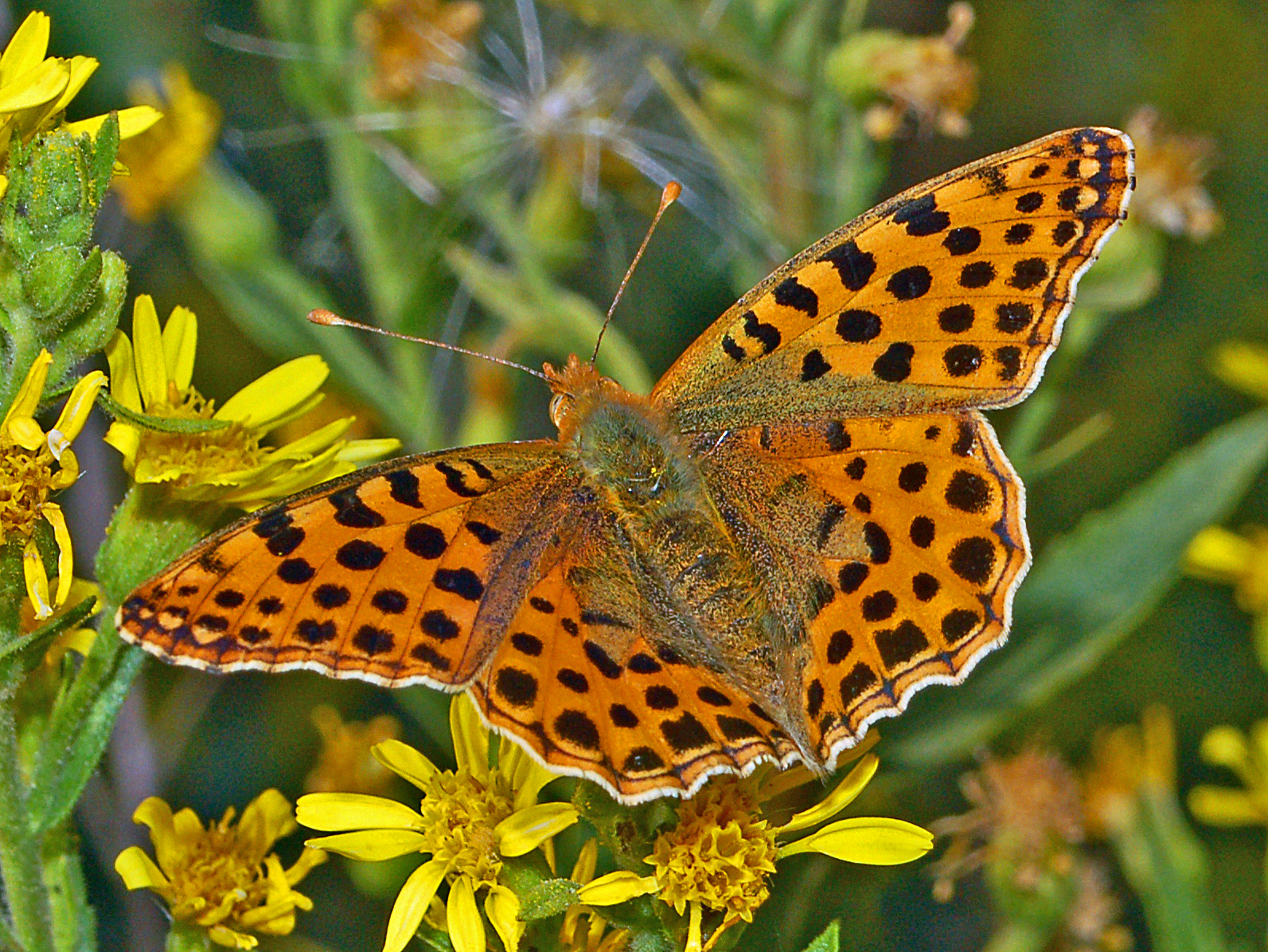
- Upperside
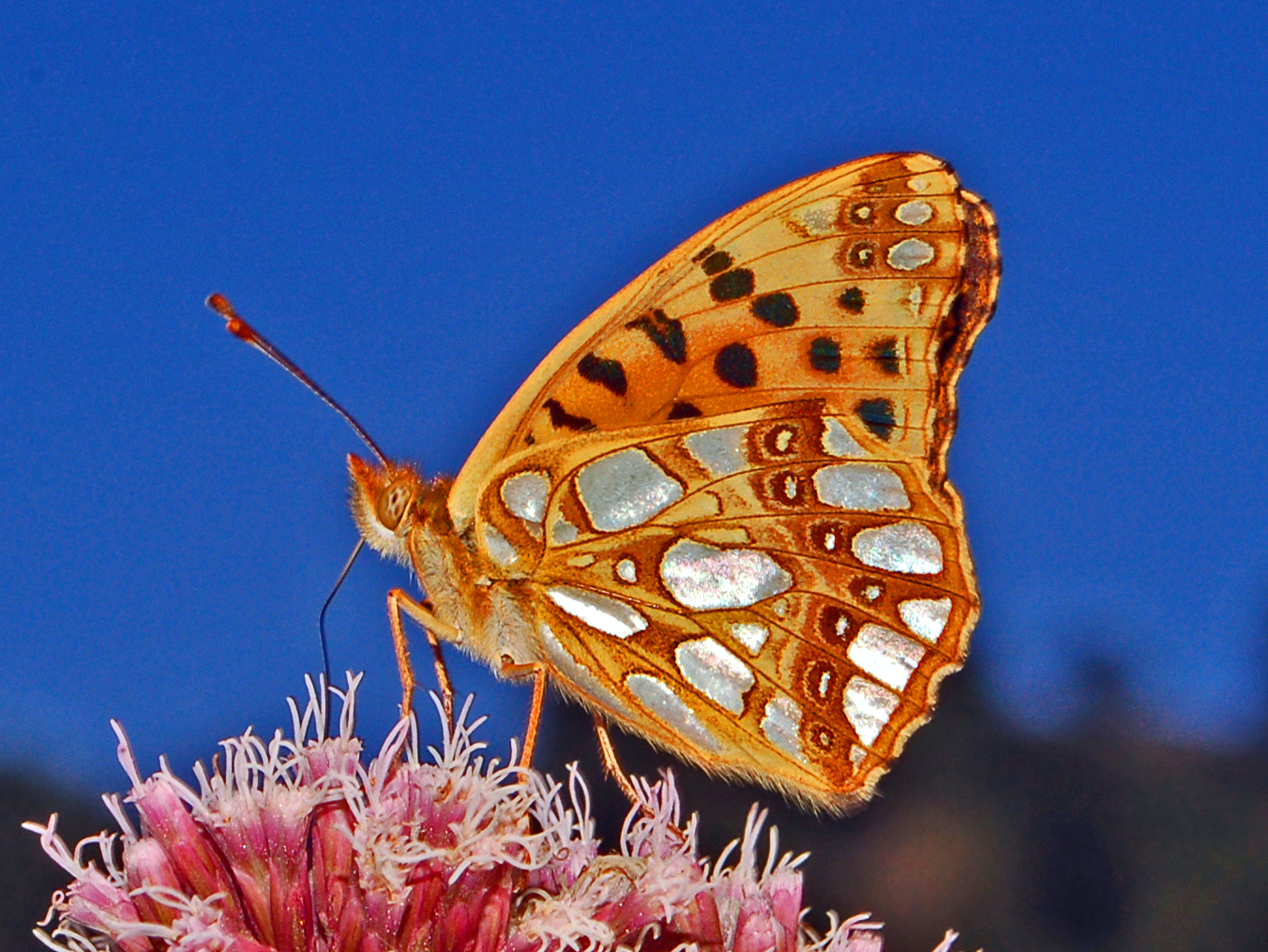
- Underside

Scientific classification
- Kingdom: Animalia
- Phylum: Arthropoda
- Clade: Pancrustacea
- Class: Insecta
- Order: Lepidoptera
- Family: Nymphalidae
- Genus: Issoria
- Species: I. lathonia

Binomial name
- Issoria lathonia (Linnaeus, 1758)

Synonyms
- List: Papilio lathonia Linnaeus, 1758; Argynnis lathonia; Papilio valdensis Esper, [1804]; Issoria saturata (Röber, 1896); Issoria hungarica (Aigner-Abafi, 1906); Issoria florens Verity, 1916; Issoria sheljuzhkoi (Stauder, 1923); Argynnis isaeea Gray, 1846; Rathora isaeae f. geogr. isaeoides Reuss, 1925

= Queen of Spain fritillary =

Species of butterfly

The Queen of Spain fritillary (Issoria lathonia) is a butterfly of the family Nymphalidae.

== Subspecies ==
Subspecies include:

- Issoria lathonia lathonia
- Issoria lathonia isaea (Gray, 1846) (Himalaya, Yunnan)
- Issoria lathonia messora (Fruhstorfer, 1909) (China)
- Issoria lathonia isaeoides Reuss, 1925 (Sichuan, China)

== Distribution and habitat ==
This migratory species is widespread in most of Europe, in North Africa, Canary Islands, and in the eastern Palearctic realm (Central Asia, Himalayas, Baluchistan, and Western China). These butterflies live in open areas, in dry lawns, agricultural wastelands and in extensive crops at altitudes between sea level and 2700 m.

=== United Kingdom ===
The species overwintered in the UK twice in the 30 years preceding 2026, at Minsmere in Suffolk in the 1990s, and close to Chichester around 2010. In 2026 thousands of the butterfly flew in from France and Spain to England's south coast. East Anglia saw the species fly in from Holland. The large influx of butterflies has led to speculation that The Queen of Spain could establish itself permanently and become Britain's 61st species of native butterfly.

== Description ==
Issoria lathonia is a medium-sized butterfly with a wingspan of 38–46 millimetres (1.5–1.8 in). The wings show a deep orange-violet background, with rounded black spots arranged in regular rows and suffused with greenish gray in the females. The underside of the hindwings is decorated with large pearly nacreous spots and it is crossed by a postdiscal row of black eyespots with pearly pupils. Some pearly spots also appear at the apex of the forewings.

The caterpillar can reach a length of 35 millimetres (1.4 in). It is grayish brown, with black spots, and relatively short brown spines with white tip, and a double row of dorsal white streaks. The suspended chrysalis is dark brown, with a large white saddle-shaped stain and some smaller ones of the same color, resembling a bird's dropping.

The imago is loosely similar to Speyeria aglaja, Fabriciana adippe and Brenthis daphne, which have the same orange color on the upperside of the wings, but show different markings and spots. Moreover, the underside of the hindwings does not have the large pearly spots characteristic of the Queen of Spain fritillary.

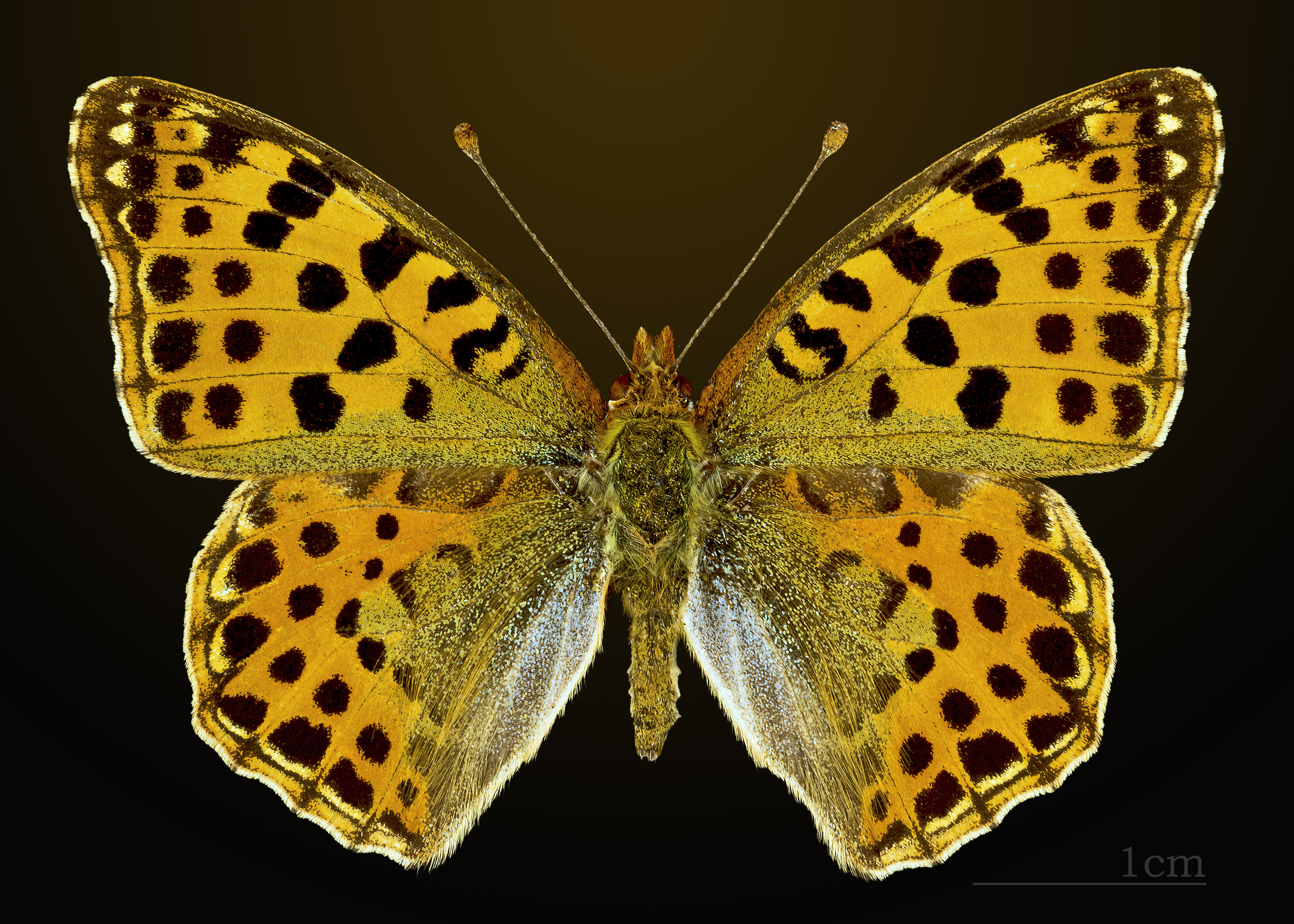
Male

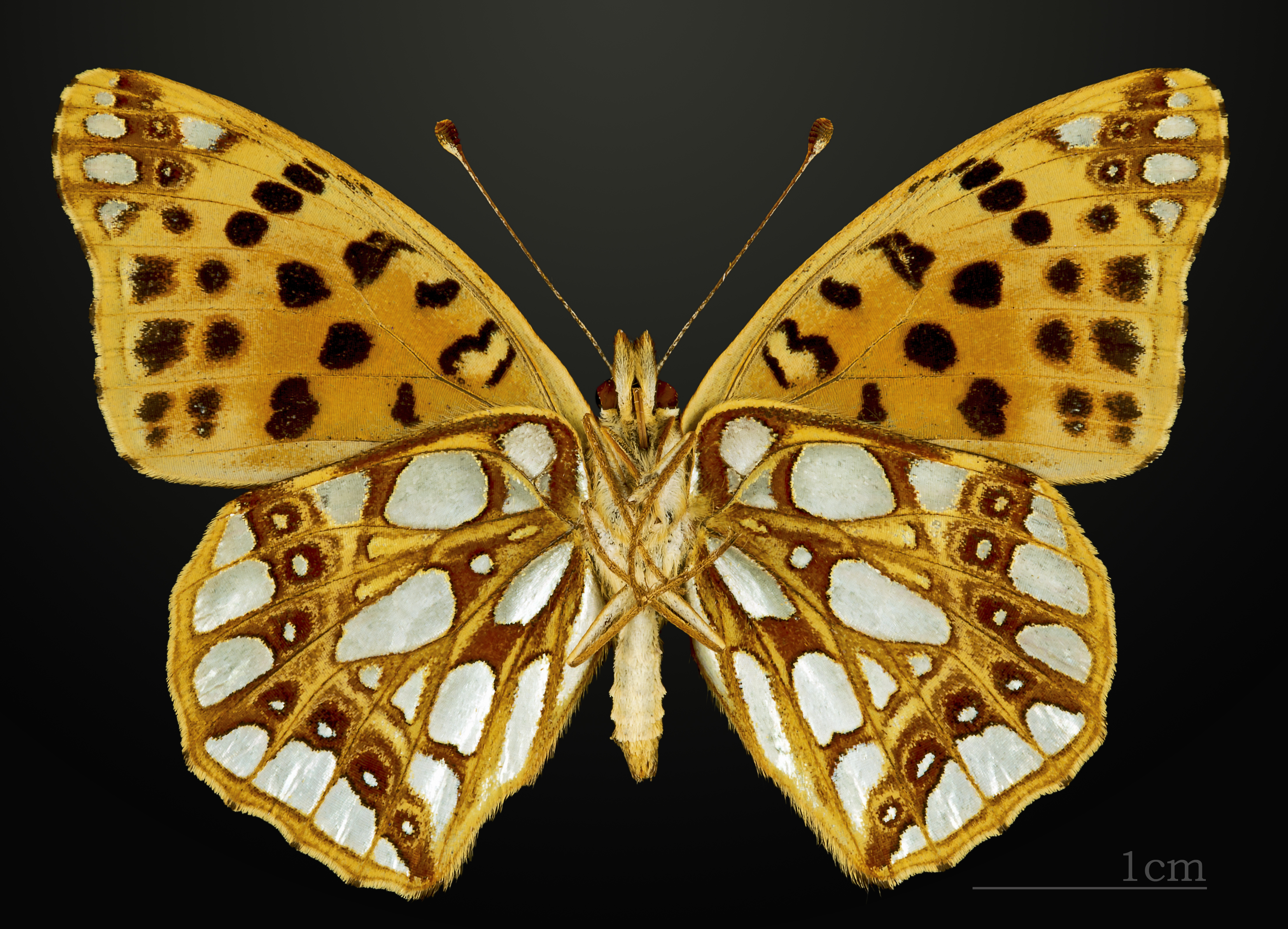
Male underside

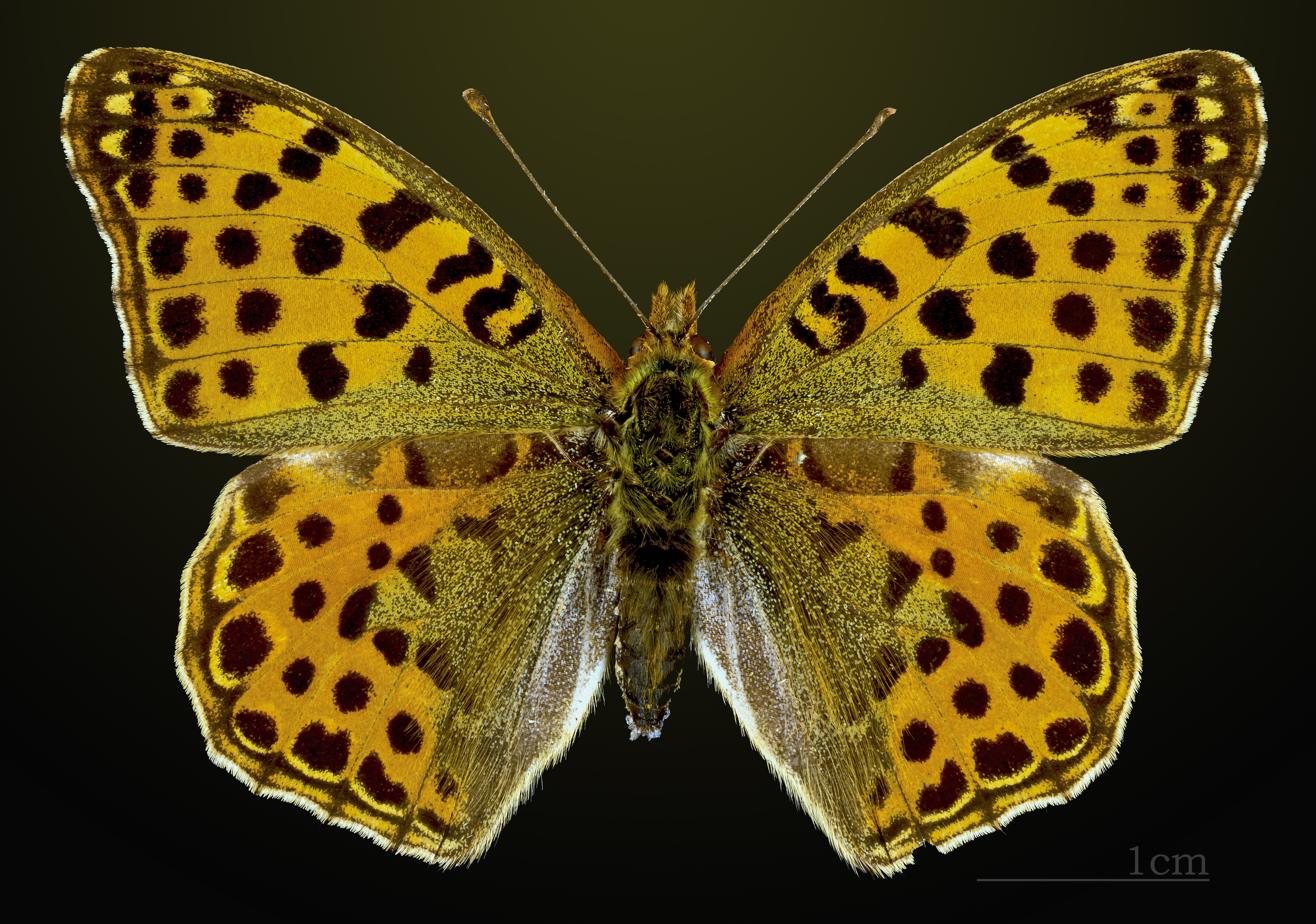
Female

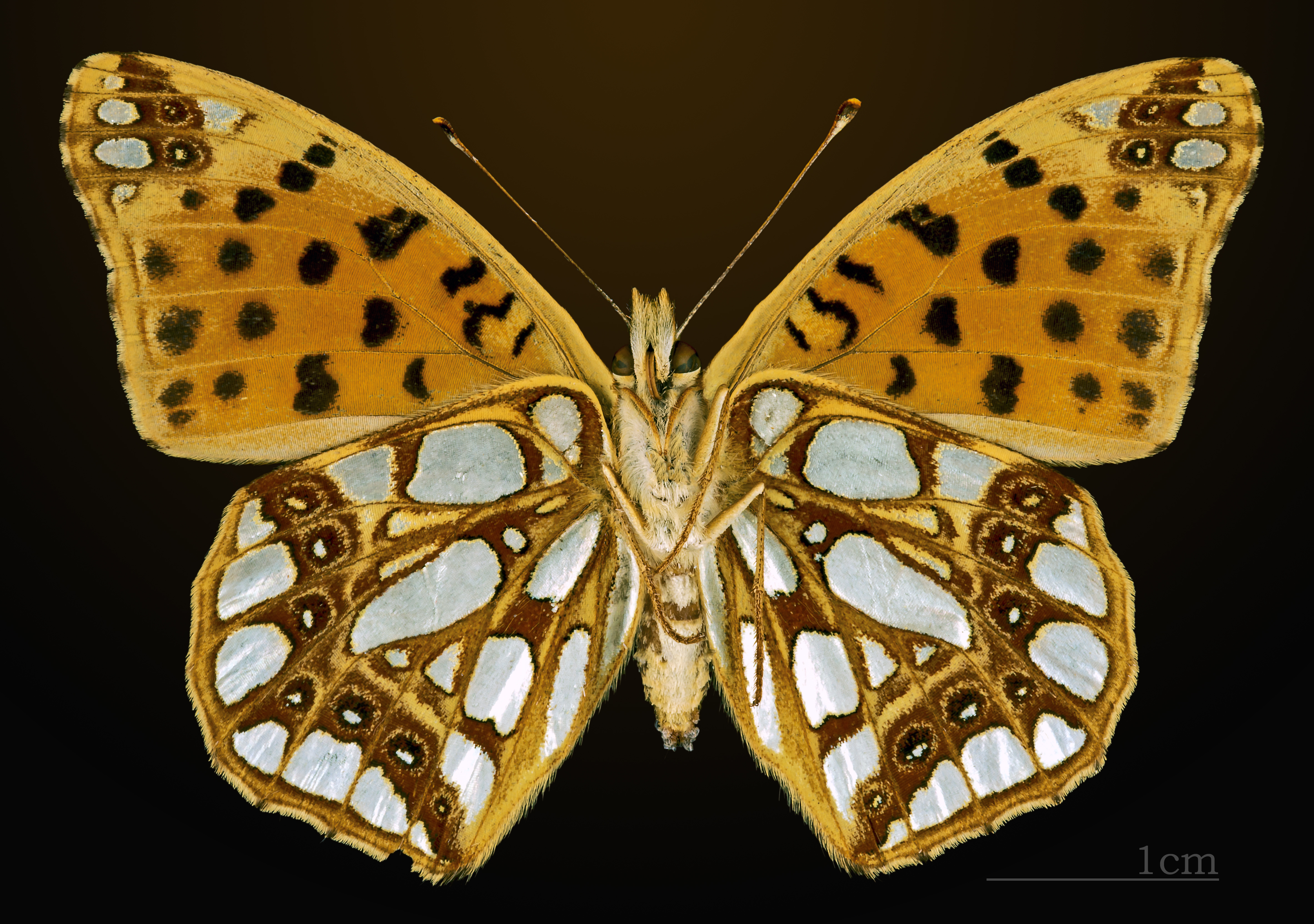
Female underside

== Biology ==
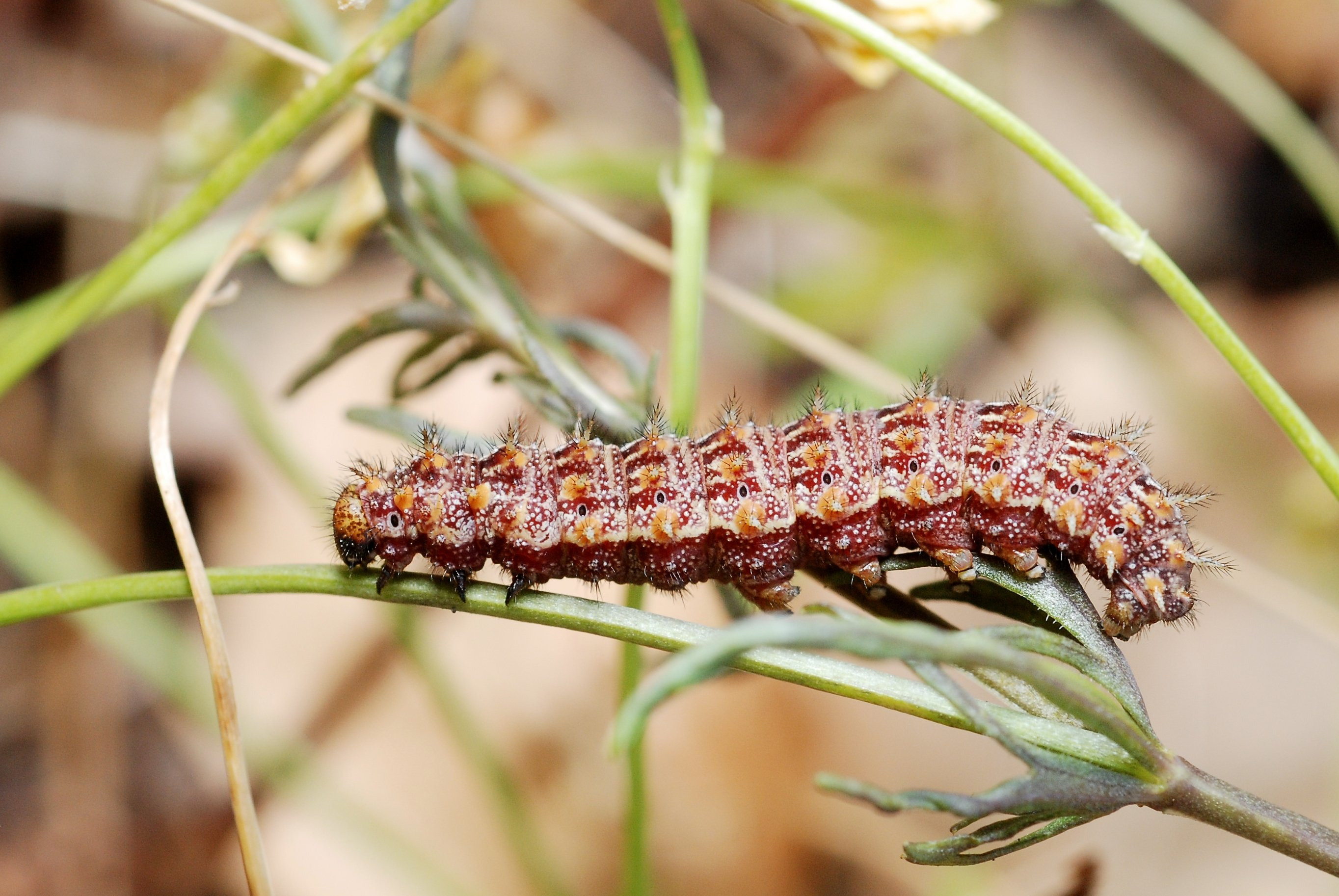
Caterpillar

This species is present almost throughout the year, with three or four successive generations. The eggs are laid separately on the underside of the leaves of the host plant. The larval cycle is exceptionally short. The pupation takes place among the low vegetation, between a few leaves united by silk. This species may overwinter at all larval stages.

Adults are strong flyers and fly from March to October. The heat-dependent caterpillars feed on Viola species (wild pansy or heartsease (Viola tricolor), field pansy (Viola arvensis), Viola canina, Viola odorata, Viola calcarata, Viola lutea, Viola biflora), lucerne (Medicago sativa), borage (Borago officinalis), Anchusa, Rubus and Onobrychis species.

In the dry regions Issoria lathonia carries out a seasonal vertical migration between hardy evergreen shrubs and small trees of plains and mountain fir pines, where it remains in summer to descend in autumn at low altitude.

== Bibliography ==
- Porter, Jim (1997), The Colour Identification Guide to Caterpillars of the British Isles (Macrolepidoptera), Viking, London. pp. 16–17.
- Bretherton, R.F. (1990), "ARGYNNIS LATHONIA (Linnaeus)", in Emmet, A.M.; Heath, J.; et al. (eds.), The Moths and Butterflies of Great Britain and Ireland, vol. 7 Part 1 (Hesperiidae to Nymphalidae), Colchester: Harley Books, pp. 222–224
- Zobar, Damla; Genc, Hanife (2008), "Biology of the Queen of Spain Fritillary, Issoria lathonia", Florida Entomologist, 91 (2): 237–240, doi:10.1653/0015-4040(2008)91[237:botqos]2.0.co;2.
- Carter, D.J.; Hargreaves, B. (2001), Guide des chenilles d'Europe (in French), Paris: Delachaux et Niestlé, ISBN 978-2-603-00639-9
- Tolman, Tom; Lewington, Richard (2010), Guide des papillons d'Europe et d'Afrique du Nord (in French), Paris: Delachaux et Niestlé, ISBN 978-2-603-01649-7
