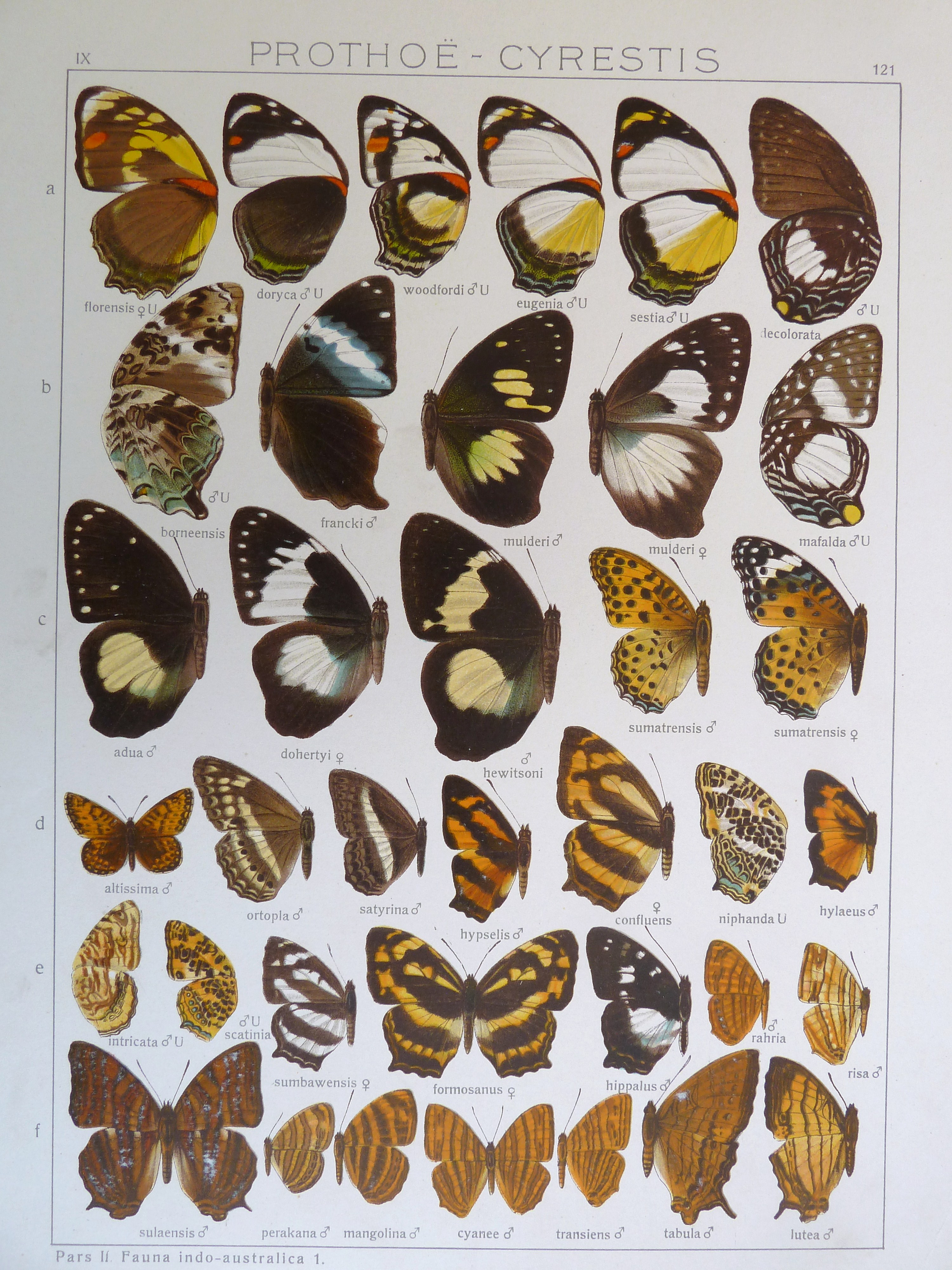
- Issoria altissima in Seitz

Scientific classification
- Kingdom: Animalia
- Phylum: Arthropoda
- Clade: Pancrustacea
- Class: Insecta
- Order: Lepidoptera
- Family: Nymphalidae
- Genus: Issoria
- Species: I. altissima

Binomial name
- Issoria altissima (Elwes, 1882)

Synonyms
- Argynnis altissima Elwes, 1882; Kuekenthaliella altissima (Elwes, 1882)

= Issoria altissima =

Species of butterfly

Issoria altissima is a small brown-chequered-with-black (fritillary) butterfly found in the Palearctic realm region that belongs to the Nymphalidae family. It was first described by Henry John Elwes in 1882. It is found in the Indian state of Sikkim and in Bhutan, Yarlung and Tibet.
