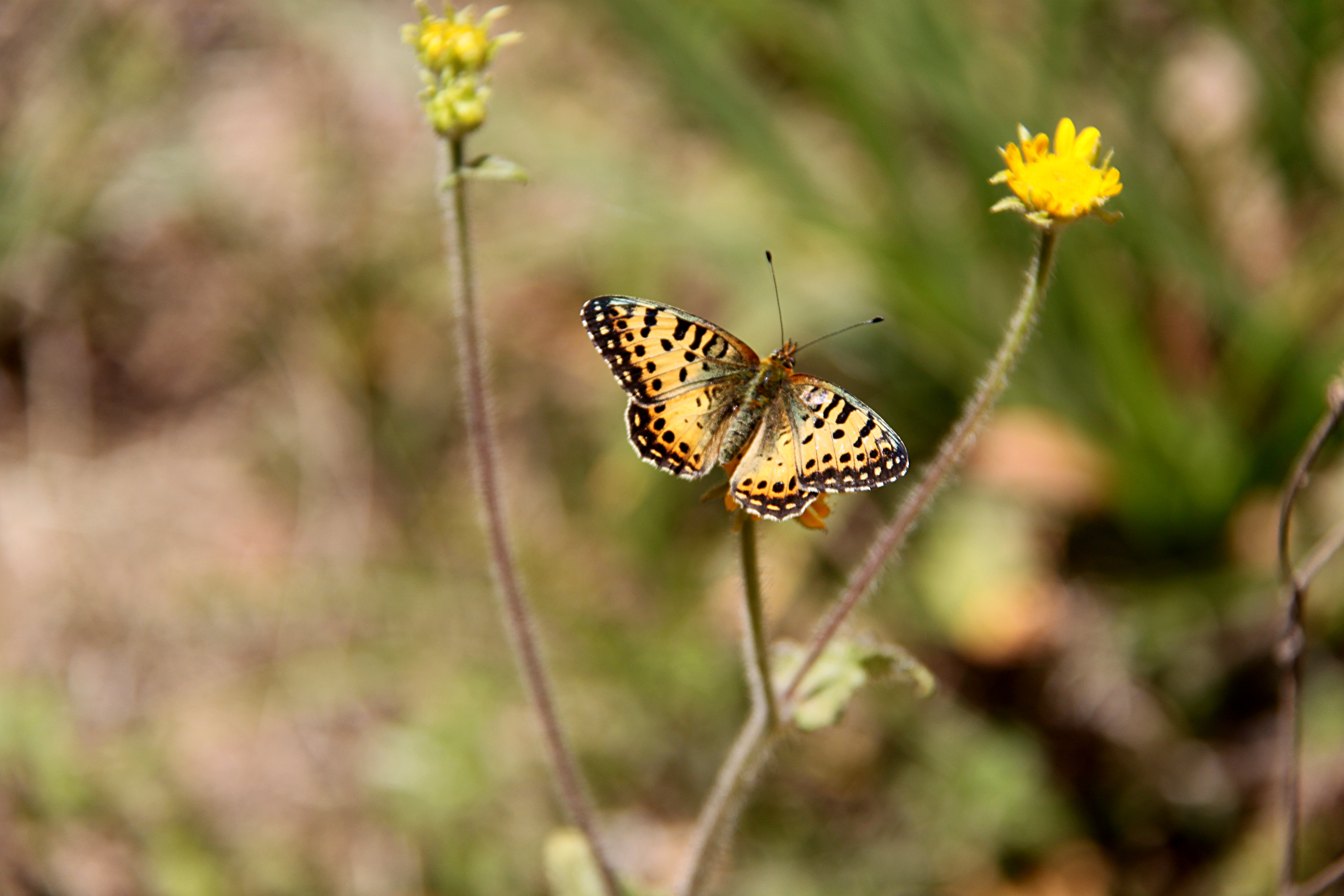

Scientific classification
- Kingdom: Animalia
- Phylum: Arthropoda
- Class: Insecta
- Order: Lepidoptera
- Family: Nymphalidae
- Genus: Issoria
- Species: I. hanningtoni

Binomial name
- Issoria hanningtoni (Elwes, 1889)

Synonyms
- Argynnis hanningtoni Elwes, 1889; Prokuekenthaliella hanningtoni; Prokuekenthaliella hanningtoni jeanneli; Argynnis hanningtoni imatonga Riley, 1932; Prokuekenthaliella hanningtoni imatonga

= Issoria hanningtoni =

Species of butterfly

Issoria hanningtoni, the Hannington's fritillary, is a butterfly in the family Nymphalidae. It is found in Sudan, Kenya and Tanzania. The habitat consists of highland forests.

== Description ==
The upperside of the wings is pale orange with strong blackish brown markings, the underside has silvery spots, common to many fritillaries.

== Ecology ==
The caterpillars feed on Viola abyssinica.

== Habitat ==
Hannington's fritillary can be found in montane forest above about 1,700 m.

== Behaviour ==
Hannington's fritillary has a low down, fast and direct flight. It prefers open forest glades, where it is often not uncommon. The silver spots on the underside of the wings may be perceived by preditors as dew-drops on grass, mimicking the butterfly's favorite overnight resting place.

== Subspecies ==
- Issoria hanningtoni hanningtoni (northern Tanzania)
- Issoria hanningtoni imatonga (Riley, 1932) (Sudan: south to the Imatong Mountains)
- Issoria hanningtoni jeanneli Bernardi, 1968 (Kenya: highlands to Mount Elgon, Mount Kenya and Aberdares)
