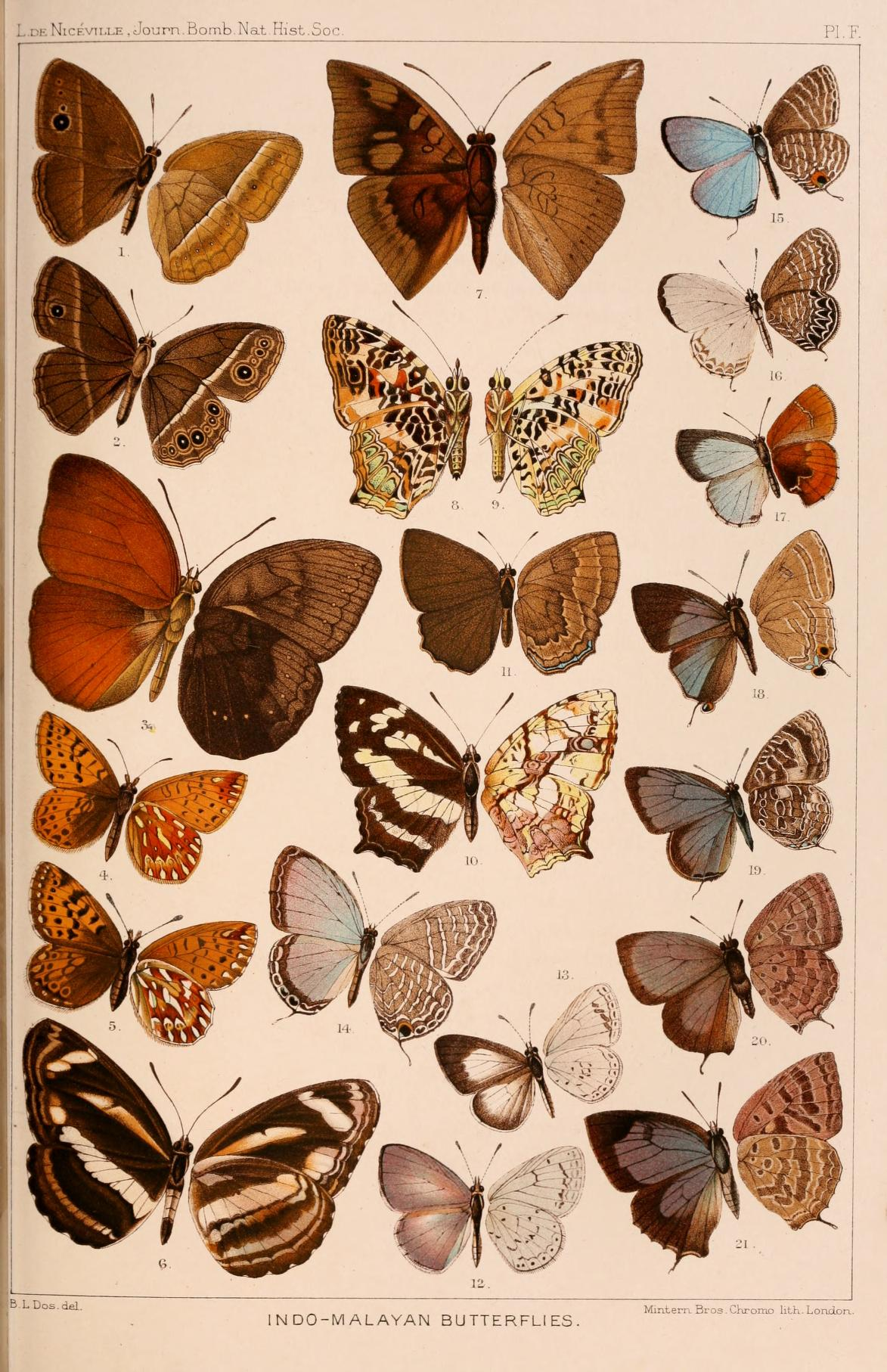
- Issoria mackinnonii illustration accompanying the original description

Scientific classification
- Domain: Eukaryota
- Kingdom: Animalia
- Phylum: Arthropoda
- Class: Insecta
- Order: Lepidoptera
- Family: Nymphalidae
- Genus: Issoria
- Species: I. mackinnonii

Binomial name
- Issoria mackinnonii (de Nicéville, 1891)

Synonyms
- Argynnis mackinnonii de Nicéville, 1891; Kuekenthaliella mackinnonii (de Nicéville, 1891)

= Issoria mackinnonii =

Species of butterfly

Issoria mackinnonii is a small brown-chequered-with-black (fritillary) butterfly found in the Palearctic region that belongs to the family Nymphalidae. It was first described by Lionel de Nicéville in 1891. It is found in the Nila and Baspa river valleys, the northwest Himalayas and central Nepal.
