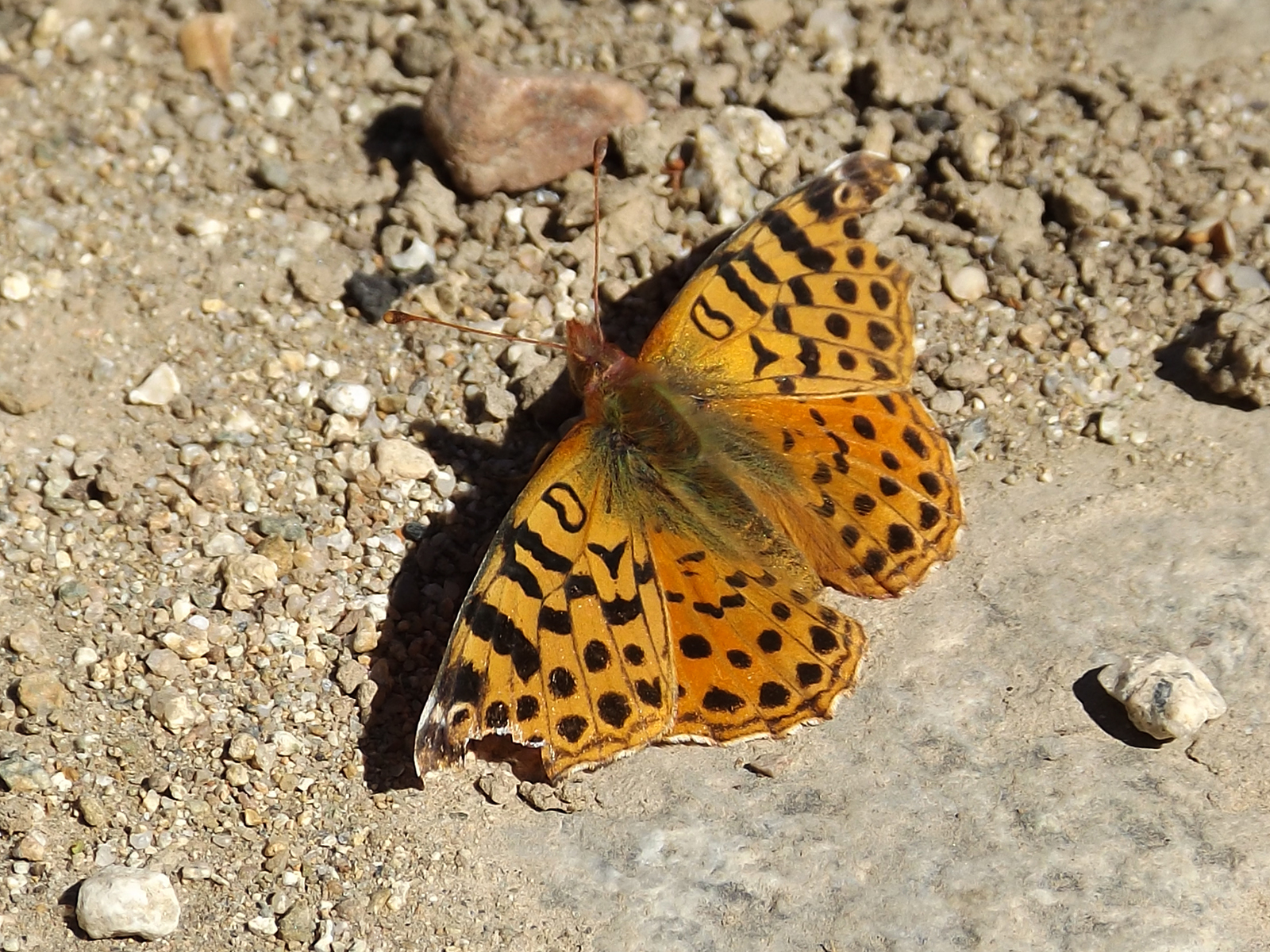
- Yramea cytheris

Scientific classification
- Domain: Eukaryota
- Kingdom: Animalia
- Phylum: Arthropoda
- Class: Insecta
- Order: Lepidoptera
- Family: Nymphalidae
- Tribe: Argynnini
- Genus: Yramea; Reuss, 1920

Species
- See text

Synonyms
- Chilargynnis Bryk, 1944

= Yramea =

Genus of brush-footed butterflies

Yramea is a genus of butterflies in the family Nymphalidae commonly found in South America.

== Taxonomy ==
The genus Yramea is sometimes included in Issoria as a subgenus.

== Species ==
Listed alphabetically:

- Yramea cytheris (Drury, [1773])
- Yramea inca (Staudinger, 1894)
- Yramea lathonioides (Blanchard, 1852)
- Yramea lynx Lamas & Grados 2004
- Yramea modesta (Blanchard, 1852)
- Yramea sobrina (Weymer, 1890)
