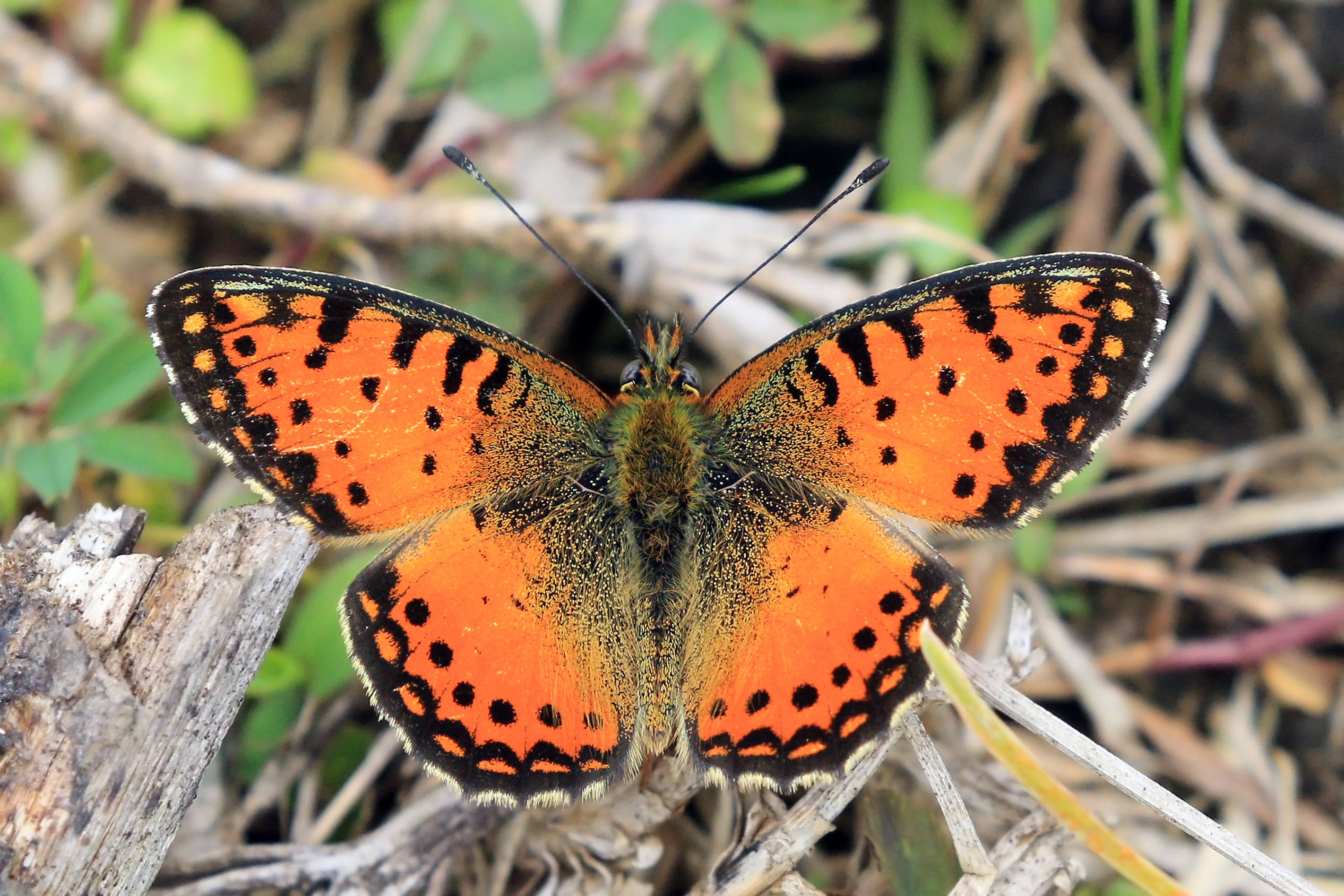
- Baumann's mountain fritillary Issoria baumanni excelsior Volcanoes National Park, Rwanda

Scientific classification
- Domain: Eukaryota
- Kingdom: Animalia
- Phylum: Arthropoda
- Class: Insecta
- Order: Lepidoptera
- Family: Nymphalidae
- Tribe: Heliconiini
- Genus: Issoria; Hübner, [1819]

Synonyms
- Rathora Moore, 1900; Kuekenthaliella Reuss, 1921; Pseudorathora Reuss, 1926; Prokuekenthaliella Reuss, 1926; Afrossoria Simonsen, 2004

= Issoria =

Genus of brush-footed butterflies

Issoria is a genus of butterflies in the family Nymphalidae commonly found in the Palearctic realm, Africa, and South America.

== Taxonomy ==
The South American genus Yramea is sometimes included in Issoria as a subgenus.

== Species ==
Listed alphabetically:

- Issoria altissima (Elwes, 1882)
- Issoria baileyi Huang, 1998
- Issoria baumanni Rebel & Rogenhofer, 1894 – Baumann's mountain fritillary
- Issoria eugenia (Eversmann, 1847)
- Issoria gemmata (Butler, 1881)
- Issoria hanningtoni Elwes, 1889 – Hannington's fritillary
- Issoria lathonia (Linnaeus, 1758) – Queen of Spain fritillary
- Issoria mackinnonii (de Nicéville, 1891)
- Issoria smaragdifera (Butler, 1895) – African queen fritillary
