= Pterolobium indicum =

Pterolobium indicum may refer to:

- Pterolobium indicum A.Rich., a synonym of P. hexapetalum
- Pterolobium indicum A. Rich. var. microphyllum (Miq.) Baker, a synonym of P. microphyllum
- Pterlobium indicum "sensu auct., non A.Rich., Fer", a synonym of P. membranulaceum
