= Axiocerses susanae =

Scientific classification
- Domain: Eukaryota
- Kingdom: Animalia
- Phylum: Arthropoda
- Class: Insecta
- Order: Lepidoptera
- Family: Lycaenidae
- Genus: Axiocerses
- Species: A. susanae

Binomial name
- Axiocerses susanae Henning & Henning, 1996

Species of butterfly

Axiocerses susanae is a butterfly in the family Lycaenidae. It is found in Zimbabwe.

Adults have been recorded in March.

The larvae feed on Peltophorum africanum, Pterolobium stellatum, Julbernardia globiflora and Schotia brachypetala. They are associated with the ant species Pheidole megacephala.
