= Siege of Hergigo =

- Part of the Ethiopian–Ottoman wars
Date	1589
Location	Hergigo, Habesh Eyalet
Result	Status quo ante bellum

Belligerents
Ethiopian Empire	Habesh Eyalet (Ottoman Empire)

Commanders and leaders
Sarsa Dengel 'Aqba Mika'él; Gabra Iyasus	Pasha Kadawrd (Huda Verdi Pasha) (fate disputed; see Aftermath)

The Siege of Hergigo was the failed siege launched by Emperor Sarsa Dengel on the fortified Ottoman-held port town of Hergigo, mentioned in the imperial chronicle under its Saho name of Dakhano, located on the coast of the Red Sea facing the island of Massawa, in 1589. The siege was part of the emperor's decade-long campaign to reclaim the north coast following the death of Bahr Negash Yeshaq at the Battle of Addi Qarro in 1578, and came after a renewed Ottoman offensive that had briefly seized Debarwa the previous rainy season

Although the Ethiopian army had broken through the outer walls of the port, wounded and apparently unhorsed the Ottoman commander, and even pushed them towards evacuation by sea, the siege ultimately broke down after eight days because the invading forces were caught up in famine due to lack of provisions; the emperor subsequently retreated to Debarwa via Debre Bizen. Hergigo and Massawa continued to elude Ethiopian control for two centuries, passing not long afterwards from Ottoman to local Na'ib rule.

== Background ==
The Ottoman Turks had been present on the Ethiopian coast since 1557, when Özdemir Pasha captured the ports of Massawa and Hergigo, placed four hundred soldiers in the town of Hergigo and advanced inland as far as Debarwa only to be forced back by Bahr Negash Yeshaq. Bahr Negash Yeshaq had betrayed the Crown and joined the Ottoman Turks in their fight and was subsequently slain on 26 December 1578 during Sarsa Dengel's victory over his forces at the Battle of Addi Qarro; his Turkish counterpart died in the battle as well, beheaded by a soldier called Yona'él. The result of the battle saw Emperor Sarsa Dengel attempt to expel the Turks from their base in Hergigo, but failing to do so; the two then entered a period of mutual tolerance, which was marked by gifts from the Turks to the Emperor.

However, it did not bring an end to the conflict. In 1588, Ottoman forces penetrated inland from Hergigo and seized control of the former stronghold of Debarwa, leaving Daharagot, who acted as both the governor of Tigray and Bahr Negash, entirely unprepared for it. The troops of Daharagot collapsed, the aqasan of Sarayé, the kantiba of Hamasén, and many others were killed, while Daharagot barely managed to escape on horseback. (Note: Pankhurst, following the Encyclopaedia Aethiopica, dates this initial Ottoman advance on Debarwa to 1587–90 and notes that some accounts describe the first Ottoman attack as having been repelled; the chronicle used by Conti Rossini instead has Daharagot's force routed outright, a version Pankhurst regards as corroborated by the royal chronicle's own detail of the banners and armour taken from his troops.) Hearing about what transpired, Sarsa Dengel went into a rage and turned into a lion chasing its prey. He summoned all his soldiers and shield-bearers to arms, threatening to seize their possessions in case they refused. He moved so quickly that it took him not ten days, but only two or three.

As the main Ottoman force rested at Debarwa, a smaller band consisting of fifty horsemen and riflemen roamed the countryside, raiding for men and livestock. The peasantry of Mazber resisted their attempt to raid, and 'Aqba Mika'él, having positioned eighty of his men along the Marab river ford, attacked them in an ambush. Dozens of the raiders were either killed or mutilated, the heads of their two leaders cut off, and the others retreated in horror to the Pasha. 'Aqba Mika'él was not a man of rank at that time, but he forwarded the captured weaponry and other equipment to the emperor, who rewarded him for this act; he would shortly be named Bahr Negash in return.

After realizing that Sarsa Dengel was approaching his camp, the Pasha preferred to retreat to his fortress on the coast instead of taking a risk in fighting him. He withdrew from Debarwa at night, leaving behind his provisions and, according to one source, nearly two thousand cannonballs, and traveled day and night continuously to arrive at Dakhano within three days. After arriving at Debarwa with the intention of forcing him to a fight, Sarsa Dengel found it deserted. He celebrated the Ethiopian Christmas at Aksum, crossed Mugarya Samr, and again reached Debarwa, deciding to bring the war into Dakhano.

== Siege ==
Sarsa Dengel marched towards Dakhano through the same route that the Turks had taken when withdrawing, after eight days spent at Debarwa. This road was described as a very narrow pathway flanked by rocky hills on both sides in such a way that the army passed in single file with the sky hardly visible above them; the army took three days to pass through the pathway to arrive at Dakhano, where they camped in front of the fortress. Here the king dispatched the Tigrayan leaders under Gabra Iyasus along with Bahr Negash 'Aqba Mika'él and his followers to encircle the fortress without attacking until he joined them from another path.

The attack began when Sarsa Dengel's forces appeared and were heralded by the anbasa horn of the king along with other trumpets and flutes. The Pasha closed the gates and divided his garrison between the towers and about four or five ships moored offshore, manning them with riflemen and gunners. Some of the king's troops succeeded in getting close to the wall after removing the prickly hedge of qantafa (Pterolobium lacerans), which was locally known as zalagiya and which the Pasha had planted as part of his defenses; they set fire to it, and the garrison managed to extinguish it with dry sand and wet mud. One of the ships offshore let loose a cannon ball that hit the head of a Tigrayan monastery, who a few minutes earlier had stated that he would shed his own blood like the blood shed of Christ after his betrayal; the chronicle regards this incident as fulfillment of his words. The musketry of the Ethiopian side killed and wounded, according to the chronicler, seventy to eighty of the garrison members, while a rifle shot broke the Pasha's armor, his spear, and he fell to the ground, throwing the garrison into such disorder that some considered abandoning the fortress by boat for Massawa.

The main assault took place on a Sunday. As there was nothing to eat in the camp, the men started feeling hungry from the beginning itself. While Sarsa Dengel was trying to press ahead with his siege, ignoring the complaints from the camp, the discontent started getting more and more evident. The following day was devoted to deliberation about the path to follow, as the discontent inside the camp had become so strong that, as per the chronicle, "the heart of the king leaned towards going back." On Tuesday, he abandoned the siege and returned to Debarwa via Debre Bizen.

== Aftermath ==
The withdrawal was accompanied by problems of its own. 'Ali Garad, a Muslim chief who had been supporting the Ethiopians, conspired behind the emperor's back about changing sides back to the Turks, and even dispatched some of his followers to catch up with the retreating army, waiting for his chance himself after he saw that he was under observation. On the fifth day of the trek, at the valley of Derfo, Sarsa Dengel called 'Ali Garad to account for his conduct and his suspected secret adherence to Islam, and had him executed on the spot. A few days later the injured Pasha sent an apology letter for reaching Debarwa and assuring the emperor that he would not cause any more trouble; Sarsa Dengel replied politely, and the Pasha followed up with some presents.

Sources differ on the Pasha's ultimate fate. In the extended royal chronicle used by Conti Rossini, he was only wounded, and the siege ended in an uneasy truce. The shorter chronicle, however, tells a different story: it names the Pasha as Kadawrd and has him killed at Dakhano by Yona'él, who had already made a reputation for himself fighting the Turks a decade earlier, with his killing memorialized in the liturgical chant known as the Deggua. Conti Rossini thought the extended chronicle was more trustworthy, since it had been written by someone who witnessed events personally, and considered the shorter chronicle to have simply confused this killing with Yona'él's earlier one at Addi Qarro. (Note: The Encyclopaedia Aethiopica identifies the Ottoman commander at Dakhano/Hergigo as "Kadawered," a corruption of Huda Verdi Pasha, the twelfth Ottoman governor of Habesh Eyalet, who had taken office in 1588.)

The unsuccessful siege signaled the effective end of direct Ethiopian efforts to expel the Ottomans by force. In his letter from the scene dated 27 October 1589, the Jesuit Antonio Fernandes noted that only a military intervention by the Portuguese from India would solve the problem. His fellow Jesuit, Francesco Lopes, still hoped for such an intervention to get rid of the Turks and bring Massawa back into the possession of the emperor, as late as June 1591. The help was never to arrive. Ottoman interest in controlling the interior had by then declined, and not long after 1589 Massawa and Hergigo were handed over to a Beja chief of the Samhar region, who ruled the towns on the Ottomans' behalf as Na'ib, or deputy; his successors held the ports, with fluctuating fortunes and periodic Ethiopian blockades, for the following two centuries.

== Bibliography ==
- Conti Rossini, Carlo (1907). Historia regis Sarsa Dengel (Malak Sagad). Corpus Scriptorum Christianorum Orientalium, Scriptores Aethiopici. French translation. Paris: e Typographeo Reipublicae.
- Pankhurst, Richard (1961). An Introduction to the Economic History of Ethiopia: From Early Times to 1800. London: Lalibela House.
- Pankhurst, Richard (1982). History of Ethiopian Towns from the Middle Ages to the Early Nineteenth Century. Äthiopistische Forschungen. Wiesbaden: Franz Steiner Verlag.
- Pankhurst, Richard (1997). The Ethiopian Borderlands: Essays in Regional History from Ancient Times to the End of the 18th Century. Lawrenceville, NJ: Red Sea Press.
- Uhlig, Siegbert (2005b). "Yonaʾel". Encyclopaedia Aethiopica. Vol. 2. Wiesbaden: Harrassowitz.
- van Donzel, Emeri (2007). "Ḥergigo". Encyclopaedia Aethiopica. Vol. 3. Wiesbaden: Harrassowitz.
