= Axiocerses callaghani =

Scientific classification
- Kingdom: Animalia
- Phylum: Arthropoda
- Class: Insecta
- Order: Lepidoptera
- Family: Lycaenidae
- Genus: Axiocerses
- Species: A. callaghani

Binomial name
- Axiocerses callaghani Henning & Henning, 1996

Species of butterfly

Axiocerses callaghani, the Callaghan's scarlet, is a butterfly in the family Lycaenidae. It is found in south-western Nigeria and Cameroon. The habitat consists of forests.

The length of the forewings is 13–15 mm for males and about 14.5 mm for females. Adults have been recorded in March and July.
