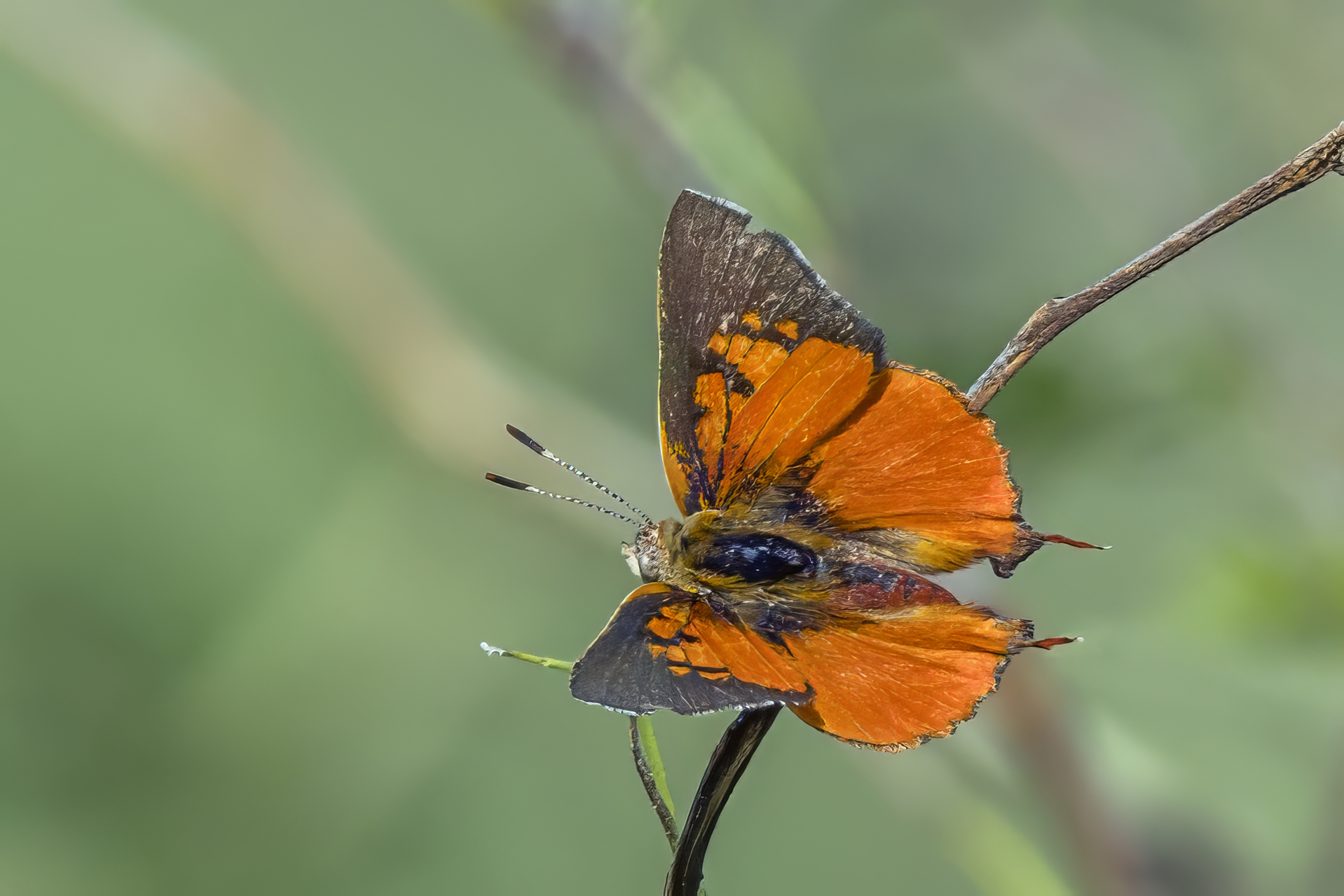
- Male
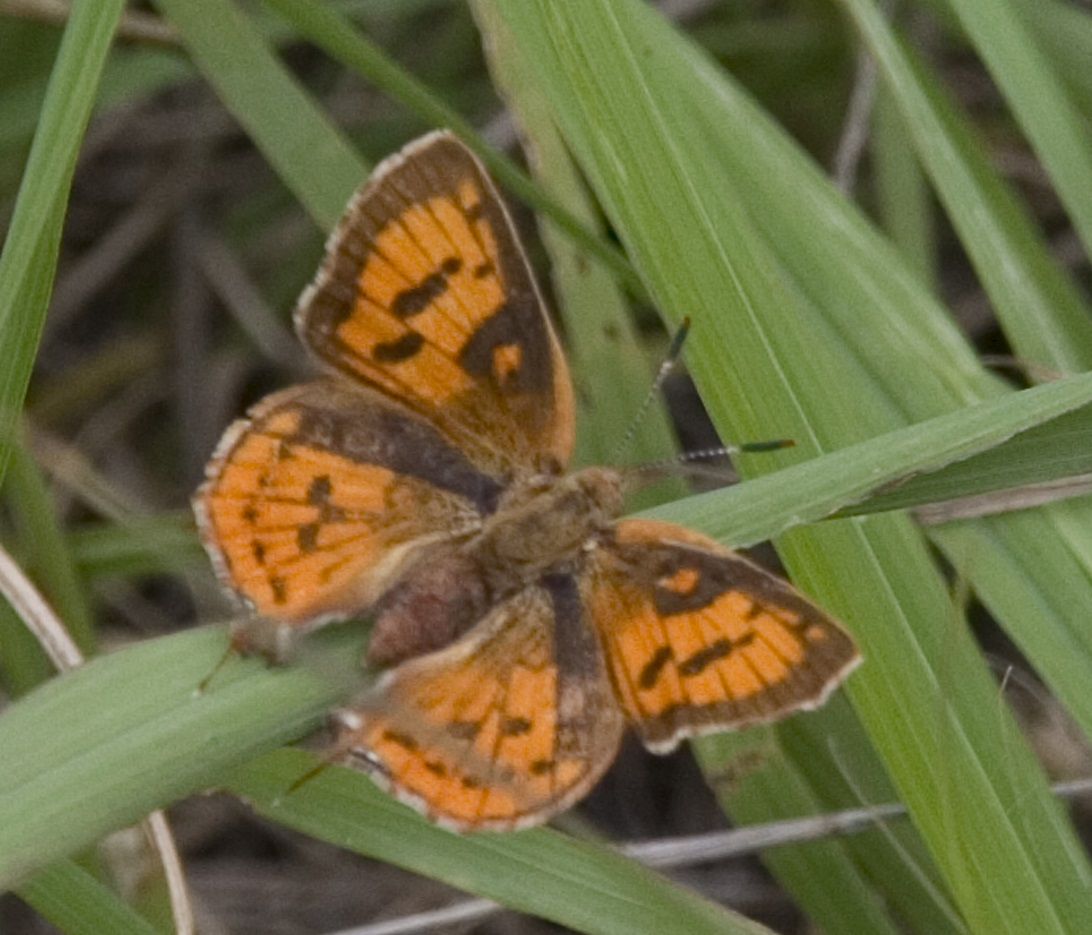
- Female

Conservation status
- Least Concern (IUCN 3.1)

Scientific classification
- Kingdom: Animalia
- Phylum: Arthropoda
- Class: Insecta
- Order: Lepidoptera
- Family: Lycaenidae
- Genus: Axiocerses
- Species: A. tjoane

Binomial name
- Axiocerses tjoane (Wallengren, 1857)

Synonyms
- Chrysorychia tjoane Wallengren, 1857

= Axiocerses tjoane =

Species of butterfly

Axiocerses tjoane, the eastern scarlet, common scarlet or scarlet butterfly, is a butterfly of the family Lycaenidae. It is found in East and southern Africa.

== Description and habits ==
The wingspan is 24–32 mm for males and 25–34 mm for females. Adults are on the wing year-round.

The larvae feed on Acacia (including A. abyssinica, A. polyacantha subsp. campylacantha and A. sieberiana var. woodii), Peltophorum africanum and Brachystegia species (all legumes).

== Subspecies ==
- Axiocerses tjoane tjoane

Range: Kenya, Tanzania, Malawi, central and eastern Zambia, Angola, Zimbabwe, Mozambique, Namibia, Botswana, Eswatini and South Africa: Limpopo, Mpumalanga, North West, Gauteng, KwaZulu-Natal and Eastern Cape provinces

- Axiocerses tjoane rubescens Henning & Henning, 1996

Range: south-eastern DRC to north-western Zambia

== Gallery ==
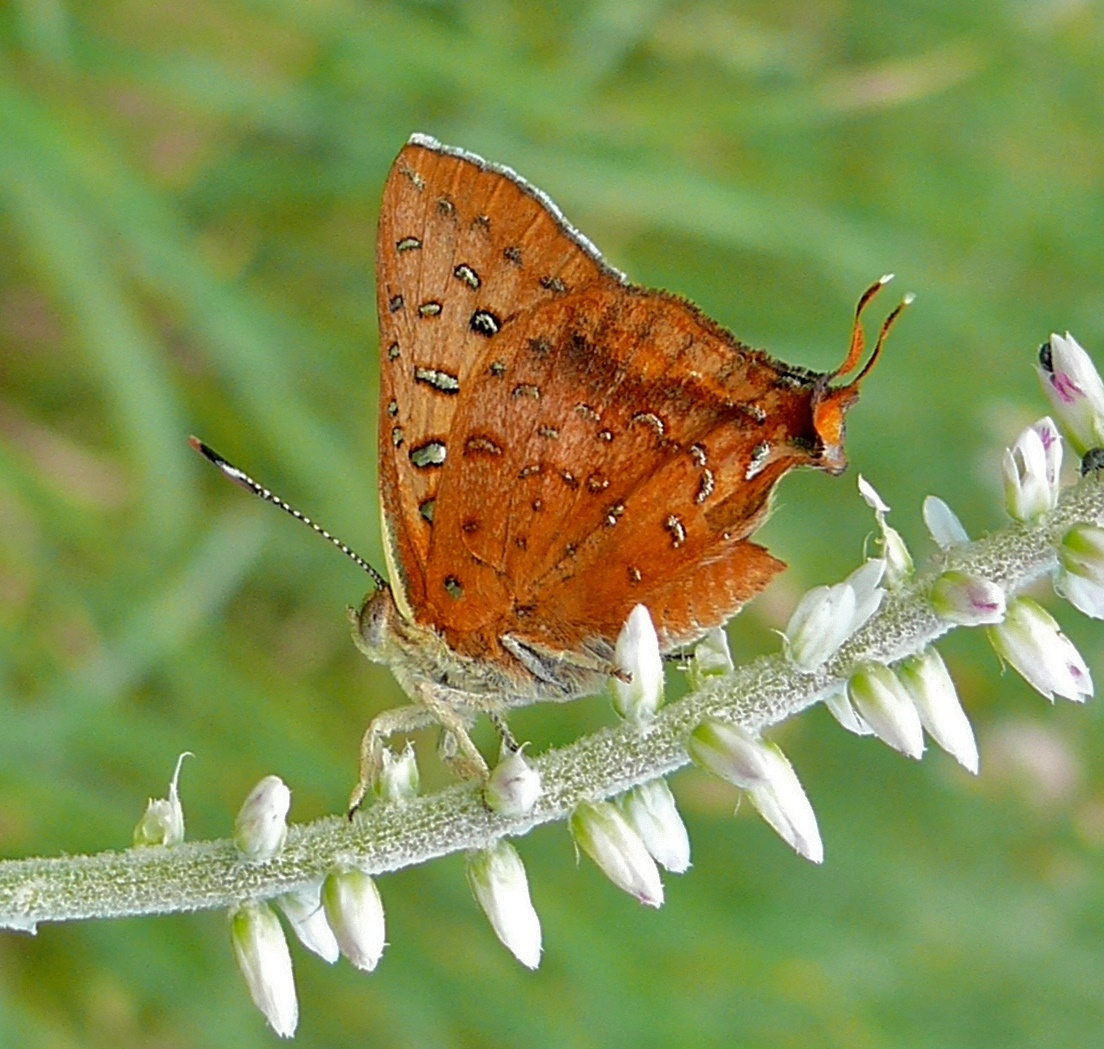
wing undersides, female

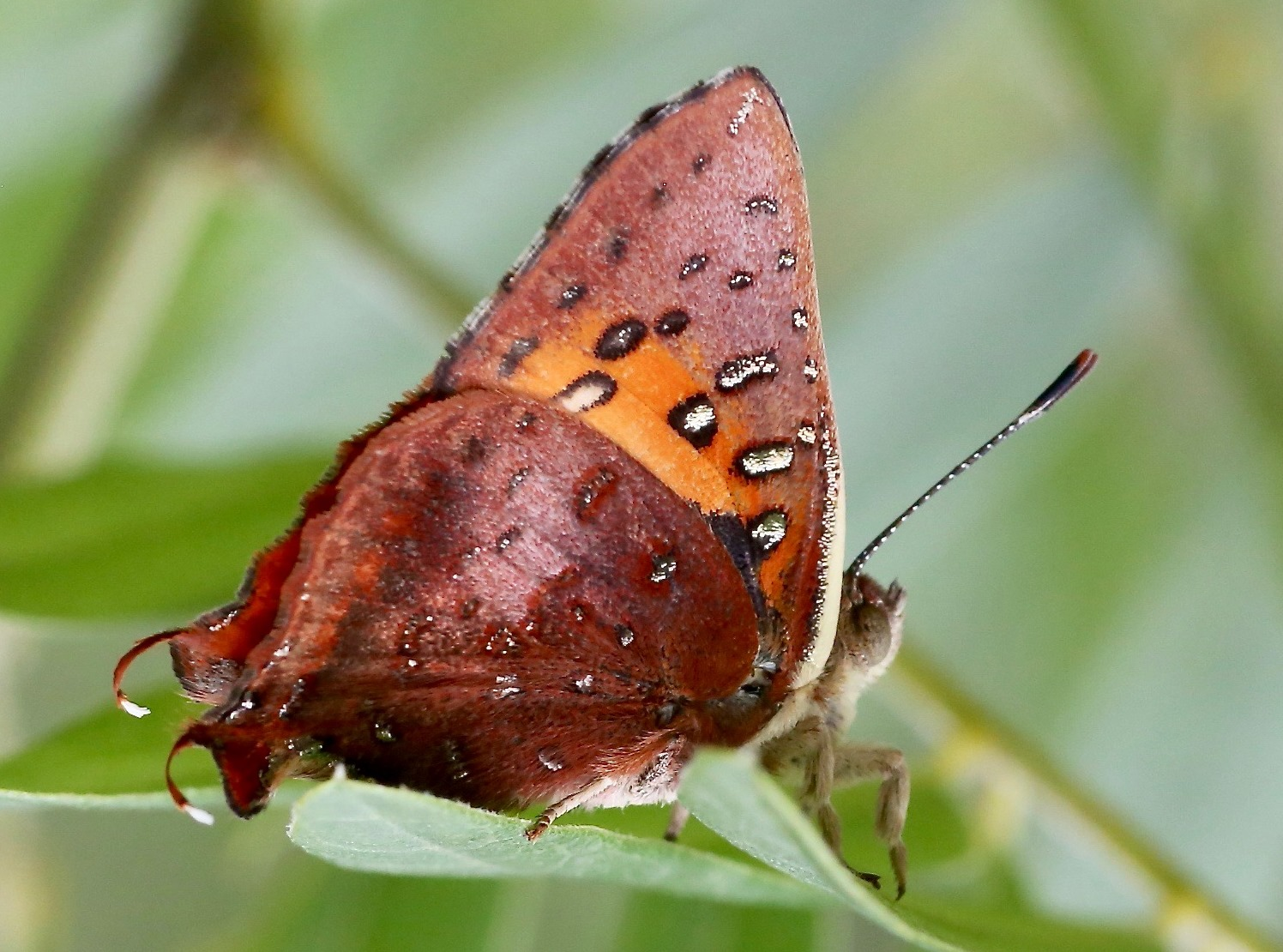
wing undersides, male
