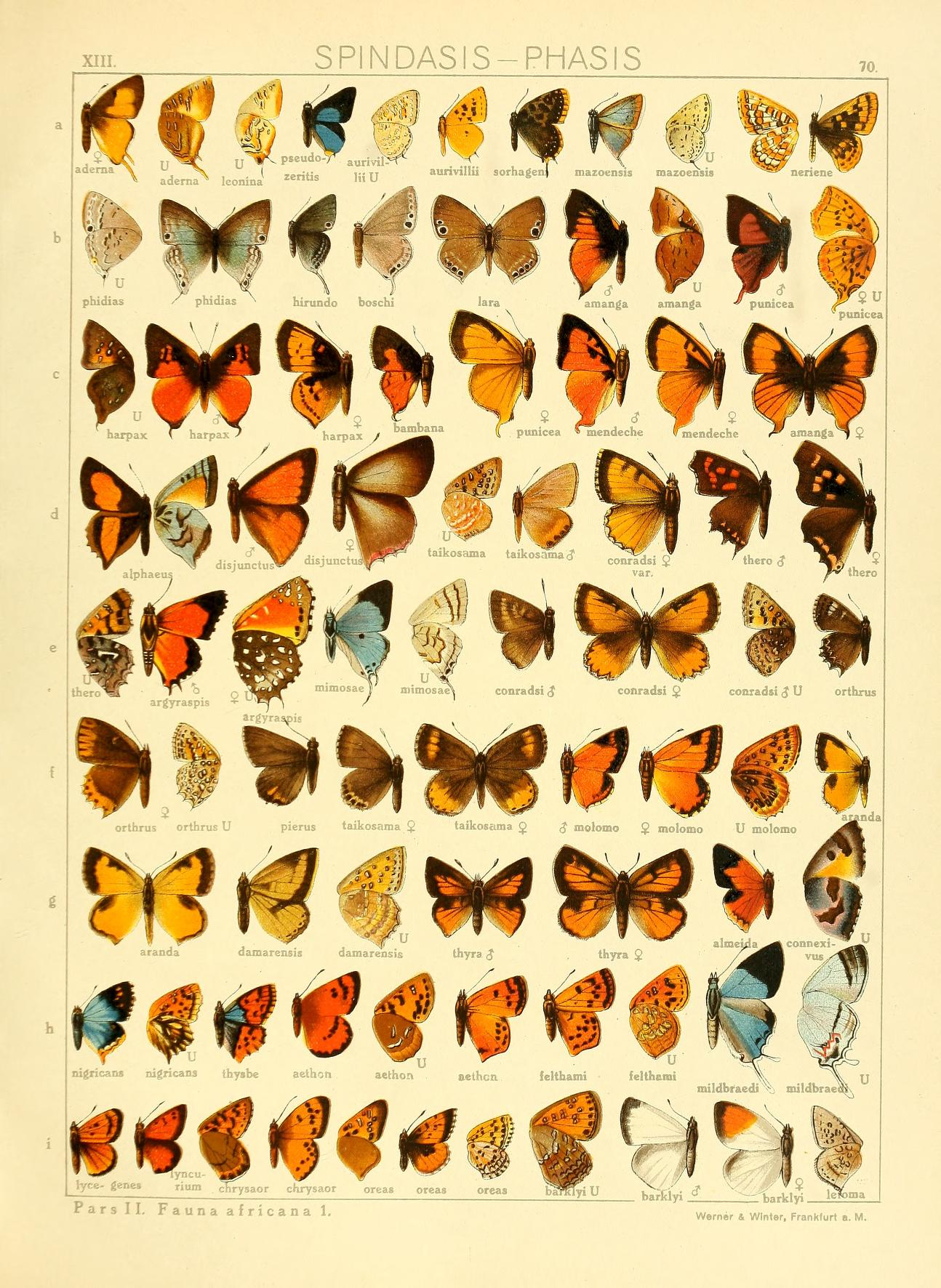

Scientific classification
- Domain: Eukaryota
- Kingdom: Animalia
- Phylum: Arthropoda
- Class: Insecta
- Order: Lepidoptera
- Family: Lycaenidae
- Genus: Axiocerses
- Species: A. punicea

Binomial name
- Axiocerses punicea (Grose-Smith, 1889)

Synonyms
- Chrysorychia punicea Grose-Smith, 1889; Chrysorychia cruenta Trimen, 1894

= Axiocerses punicea =

Species of butterfly

Axiocerses punicea, the rainforest scarlet or Punic scarlet, is a butterfly in the family Lycaenidae. It is found in Kenya, Tanzania, Malawi, Zimbabwe, Mozambique and possibly the Democratic Republic of the Congo. The habitat consists of forests.

Adults are attracted to flowering shrubs. They are on wing year round.

The larvae feed on Ximenia afra.

== Subspecies ==
- Axiocerses punicea punicea (Kenya, Tanzania, Malawi)
- Axiocerses punicea cruenta (Trimen, 1894) (Zimbabwe, Mozambique)
