= Axiocerses styx =

Scientific classification
- Kingdom: Animalia
- Phylum: Arthropoda
- Class: Insecta
- Order: Lepidoptera
- Family: Lycaenidae
- Genus: Axiocerses
- Species: A. styx

Binomial name
- Axiocerses styx Rebel, 1908

Synonyms
- Axiocerses harpax styx Rebel, 1908

Species of butterfly

Axiocerses styx is a butterfly in the family Lycaenidae. It is found in north-eastern Tanzania. The habitat consists of lowland forests at altitudes between 600 and 1,000 meters.
