= Axiocerses kiellandi =

Scientific classification
- Kingdom: Animalia
- Phylum: Arthropoda
- Class: Insecta
- Order: Lepidoptera
- Family: Lycaenidae
- Genus: Axiocerses
- Species: A. kiellandi

Binomial name
- Axiocerses kiellandi Henning & Henning, 1996

Species of butterfly

Axiocerses kiellandi is a butterfly in the family Lycaenidae. It is found in south-central Tanzania. The habitat consists of forests at altitudes between 350 and 500 meters.

Adults have been recorded in June.
