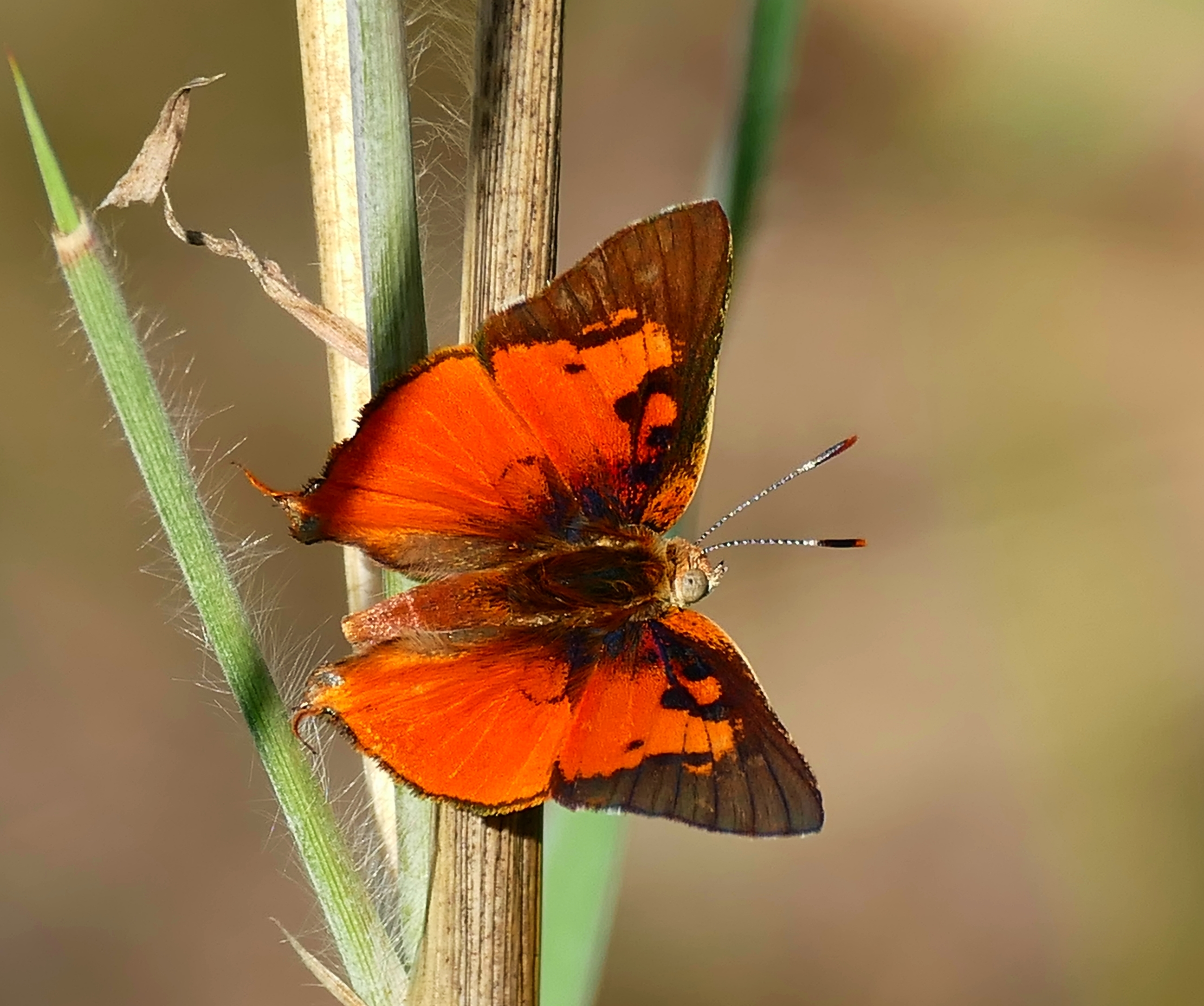
- A male Common scarlet (A. tjoane) in the Kruger National Park

Scientific classification
- Domain: Eukaryota
- Kingdom: Animalia
- Phylum: Arthropoda
- Class: Insecta
- Order: Lepidoptera
- Family: Lycaenidae
- Subfamily: Aphnaeinae
- Genus: Axiocerses; Hübner, [1819]

Synonyms
- Chrysorychia Wallengren, 1857

= Axiocerses =

Butterfly genus in family Lycaenidae

Axiocerses is a genus of butterflies in the family Lycaenidae. The species of this genus are found in the Afrotropical realm.

== Species ==
- Axiocerses amanga (Westwood, 1881)
- Axiocerses argenteomaculata Pagenstecher, 1902
- Axiocerses bambana Grose-Smith, 1900
- Axiocerses bamptoni Henning & Henning, 1996
- Axiocerses callaghani Henning & Henning, 1996
- Axiocerses coalescens Henning & Henning, 1996
- Axiocerses collinsi Henning & Henning, 1996
- Axiocerses croesus (Trimen, 1862)
- Axiocerses harpax (Fabricius, 1775)
- Axiocerses heathi Henning & Henning, 1996
- Axiocerses jacksoni Stempffer, 1948
- Axiocerses karinae Henning & Henning, 1996
- Axiocerses kiellandi Henning & Henning, 1996
- Axiocerses maureli Dufrane, 1954
- Axiocerses melanica Henning & Henning, 1996
- Axiocerses nyika Quickelberge, 1984
- Axiocerses punicea (Grose-Smith, 1889)
- Axiocerses styx Rebel, 1908
- Axiocerses susanae Henning & Henning, 1996
- Axiocerses tjoane (Wallengren, 1857)
