= Axiocerses argenteomaculata =

Scientific classification
- Kingdom: Animalia
- Phylum: Arthropoda
- Class: Insecta
- Order: Lepidoptera
- Family: Lycaenidae
- Genus: Axiocerses
- Species: A. argenteomaculata

Binomial name
- Axiocerses argenteomaculata Pagenstecher, 1902

Species of butterfly

Axiocerses argenteomaculata is a butterfly in the family Lycaenidae. It was described by Arnold Pagenstecher in 1902. It is found in Burka, Ethiopia.
