= Pterolobium punctatum =

Scientific classification
- Kingdom: Plantae
- Clade: Tracheophytes
- Clade: Angiosperms
- Clade: Eudicots
- Clade: Rosids
- Order: Fabales
- Family: Fabaceae
- Subfamily: Caesalpinioideae
- Genus: Pterolobium
- Species: P. punctatum

Binomial name
- Pterolobium punctatum Hemsl.

Synonyms
- Cantuffa punctata (Hemsl.) Kuntze; Caesalpinia aestivalis Chun & F.C.How; Prosopis esquirolii H.Lév.; Pterolobium rosthornii Harms

Species of legume

Pterolobium punctatum is a flowering plant in the family Fabaceae. Its native range is South China to Hainan.
