= Axiocerses collinsi =

Scientific classification
- Kingdom: Animalia
- Phylum: Arthropoda
- Clade: Pancrustacea
- Class: Insecta
- Order: Lepidoptera
- Family: Lycaenidae
- Genus: Axiocerses
- Species: A. collinsi

Binomial name
- Axiocerses collinsi Henning & Henning, 1996

Species of butterfly

Axiocerses collinsi is a butterfly in the family Lycaenidae. It is found in the coastal forests of Kenya. The habitat consists of coastal forests.

Adults have been recorded in May, July, December and April.
