= Axiocerses heathi =

Scientific classification
- Domain: Eukaryota
- Kingdom: Animalia
- Phylum: Arthropoda
- Class: Insecta
- Order: Lepidoptera
- Family: Lycaenidae
- Genus: Axiocerses
- Species: A. heathi

Binomial name
- Axiocerses heathi Henning & Henning, 1996

Species of butterfly

Axiocerses heathi is a butterfly in the family Lycaenidae. It is found in north-western Zambia.
