= Axiocerses croesus =

Dark-banded scarlet

Conservation status
- Least Concern (IUCN 3.1)

Scientific classification
- Kingdom: Animalia
- Phylum: Arthropoda
- Class: Insecta
- Order: Lepidoptera
- Family: Lycaenidae
- Genus: Axiocerses
- Species: A. croesus

Binomial name
- Axiocerses croesus (Trimen, 1862)

Synonyms
- Zeritis croesus Trimen, 1862

Species of butterfly

Axiocerses croesus, the dark-banded scarlet, is a butterfly of the family Lycaenidae. It is found in the Eastern Cape, west up to Port Elizabeth and into Kwazulu-Natal.

The wingspan is 24–32 mm for males and 25–34 mm for females. Adults are on wing year-round in the northern part of the range. There are two generations per year in the south with adults on wing from September to October and from February to May.

The larvae feed on Acacia species.
