= Axiocerses nyika =

Scientific classification
- Domain: Eukaryota
- Kingdom: Animalia
- Phylum: Arthropoda
- Class: Insecta
- Order: Lepidoptera
- Family: Lycaenidae
- Genus: Axiocerses
- Species: A. nyika

Binomial name
- Axiocerses nyika Quickelberge, 1984

Species of butterfly

Axiocerses nyika is a butterfly in the family Lycaenidae. It is found in Malawi (the Nyika Plateau and Chisange Falls) and Zambia. The habitat consists of hills with stunted, shrubby vegetation, at altitudes between 1,980 and 2,290 meters.

Adults have been recorded in December.
