= Axiocerses coalescens =

Conservation status
- Least Concern (IUCN 3.1)

Scientific classification
- Kingdom: Animalia
- Phylum: Arthropoda
- Class: Insecta
- Order: Lepidoptera
- Family: Lycaenidae
- Genus: Axiocerses
- Species: A. coalescens

Binomial name
- Axiocerses coalescens Henning & Henning, 1996

Species of butterfly

Axiocerses coalescens, the black-tipped scarlet, is a butterfly of the family Lycaenidae. It is found in wooded savanna areas in Gauteng, Mpumalanga, Limpopo and north-western South Africa and further to the north.

The wingspan is 24–32 mm for males and 25–34 mm for females. Adults are on wing year-round.

The larvae feed on Acacia species. They are associated with ants of the family Formicidae.
