= Axiocerses karinae =

Scientific classification
- Domain: Eukaryota
- Kingdom: Animalia
- Phylum: Arthropoda
- Class: Insecta
- Order: Lepidoptera
- Family: Lycaenidae
- Genus: Axiocerses
- Species: A. karinae

Binomial name
- Axiocerses karinae Henning & Henning, 1996

Species of butterfly

Axiocerses karinae is a butterfly in the family Lycaenidae. It is found in Malawi.

Adults have been recorded in May, December, January and February.

The larvae feed on Ximenia afra. They are associated with ants of the genus Crematogaster.
