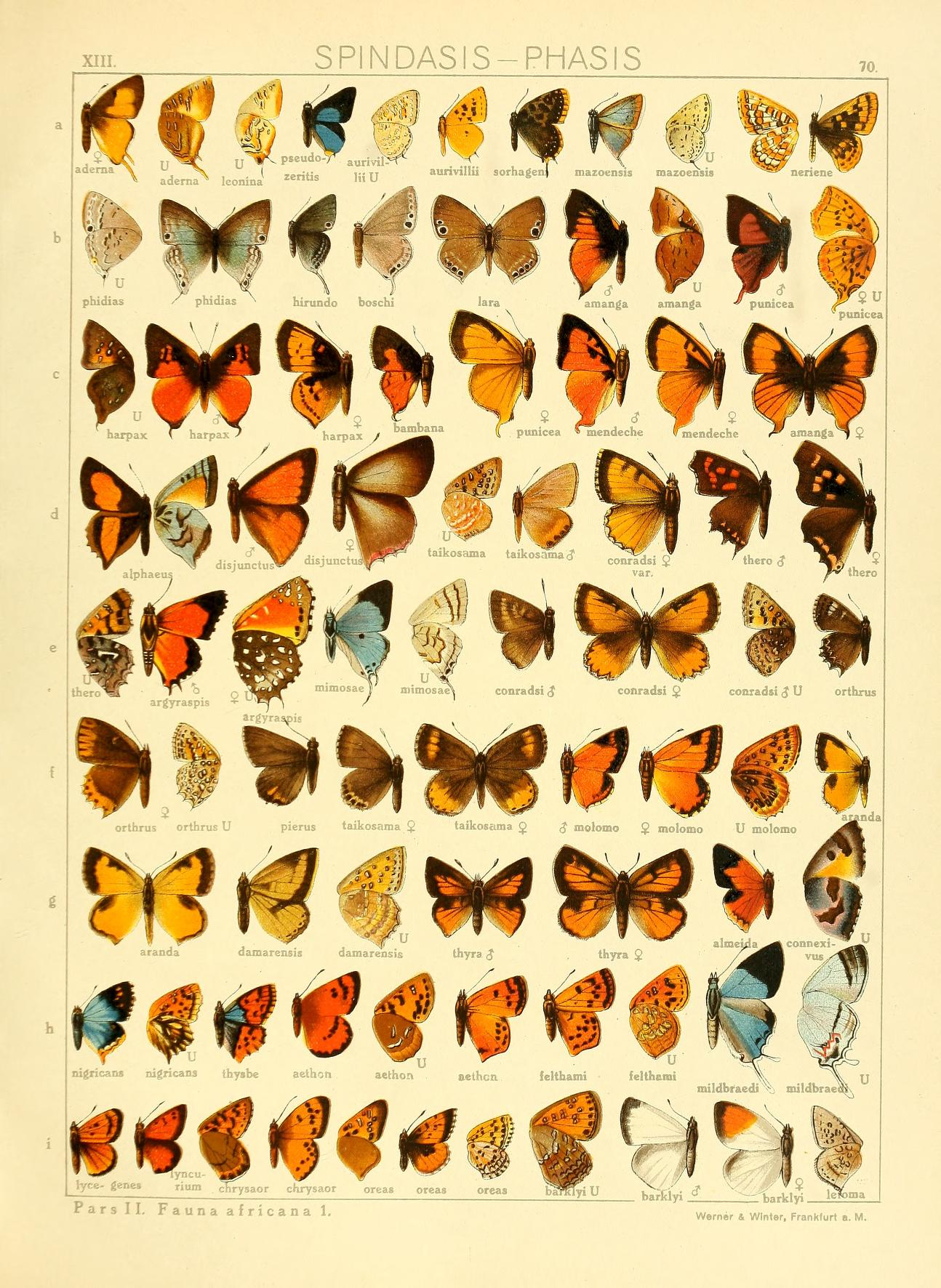

Scientific classification
- Domain: Eukaryota
- Kingdom: Animalia
- Phylum: Arthropoda
- Class: Insecta
- Order: Lepidoptera
- Family: Lycaenidae
- Genus: Axiocerses
- Species: A. bambana

Binomial name
- Axiocerses bambana Grose-Smith, 1900

Synonyms
- Axiocerses mendeche ab. bistrigata Aurivillius, 1923; Axiocerses harpax harpax f. joannisi Dufrane, 1954; Axiocerses bambana f. pallida Berger, 1981

= Axiocerses bambana =

Species of butterfly

Axiocerses bambana is a butterfly in the family Lycaenidae. It is found in the Democratic Republic of the Congo, Tanzania and Zambia. The habitat consists of moist woodland.

Adults have been recorded in November, December and March.

== Subspecies ==
- Axiocerses bambana bambana (Tanzania)
- Axiocerses bambana orichalcea Henning & Henning, 1996 (south-eastern Democratic Republic of the Congo, central Zambia)
