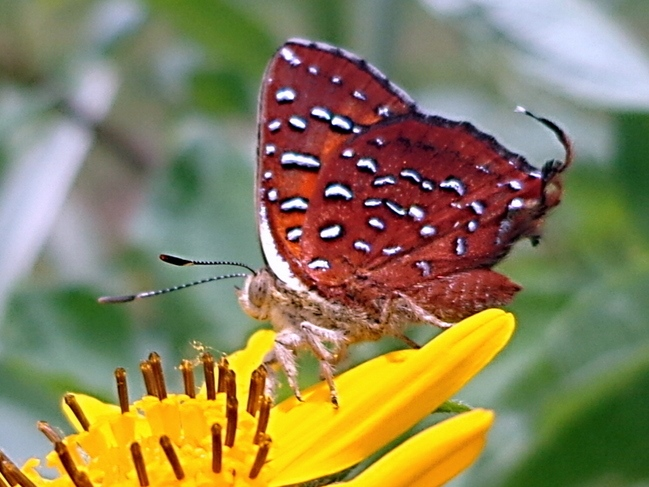

Scientific classification
- Kingdom: Animalia
- Phylum: Arthropoda
- Clade: Pancrustacea
- Class: Insecta
- Order: Lepidoptera
- Family: Lycaenidae
- Genus: Axiocerses
- Species: A. harpax

Binomial name
- Axiocerses harpax (Fabricius, 1775)

Synonyms
- Papilio harpax Fabricius, 1775; Papilio perion Stoll, 1782; Axiocerses harpax piscatoris Clench, 1943

= Axiocerses harpax =

Common scarlet

Species of butterfly

Axiocerses harpax, the common scarlet, is a butterfly in the family Lycaenidae.

== Range ==
It is found in Senegal, the Gambia, Guinea-Bissau, Guinea, Mali, Sierra Leone, Liberia, Ivory Coast, Burkina Faso, Ghana, Togo, Benin, Nigeria, Cameroon, Chad, the Central African Republic, the DRCongo, Sudan, Uganda, Ethiopia, Somalia, Yemen, Oman, Kenya and Tanzania. The habitat consists of forests, woodland and savanna.

== Description ==
The length of the forewings is 15.5-17.2 mm for males and 14.5-18.5 mm for females.

== Biology and food plants ==
The adults of both sexes are attracted to flowers. The larvae feed on Acacia drepanolobium and Acacia stenocarpa. They are associated with ants of the Crematogaster and Pheidole genera. They live under the bark of their host plant and are gregarious.

== Subspecies ==
- A. h. harpax – Senegal, the Gambia, Guinea-Bissau, Guinea, Mali, Sierra Leone, Liberia, Ivory Coast, Ghana, Togo, Benin, western Nigeria
- A. h. efulena Clench, 1963 – southern Cameroon, DRCongo
- A. h. kadugli Talbot, 1935 – Senegal, Mali, Chad, Sudan, Ethiopia, Somalia, Yemen, Oman: Dhofar
- A. h. ugandana Clench, 1963 – south-eastern Central African Republic, north-eastern DRCongo, Uganda, western Kenya, north-western Tanzania

Torben Larsen developed a species numbering system for his 2005 publication Butterflies of West Africa. The nominate subspecies is #375. The 'Larsen' numbers have since been used with permission in A Sharp Eye on Butterflies of Ghana.
