= Pterolobium densiflorum =

Scientific classification
- Kingdom: Plantae
- Clade: Tracheophytes
- Clade: Angiosperms
- Clade: Eudicots
- Clade: Rosids
- Order: Fabales
- Family: Fabaceae
- Subfamily: Caesalpinioideae
- Genus: Pterolobium
- Species: P. densiflorum

Binomial name
- Pterolobium densiflorum Prain

Species of legume

Pterolobium densiflorum is a flowering plant in the family Fabaceae.
