= Axiocerses bamptoni =

Scientific classification
- Domain: Eukaryota
- Kingdom: Animalia
- Phylum: Arthropoda
- Class: Insecta
- Order: Lepidoptera
- Family: Lycaenidae
- Genus: Axiocerses
- Species: A. bamptoni

Binomial name
- Axiocerses bamptoni Henning & Henning, 1996

Species of butterfly

Axiocerses bamptoni is a butterfly in the family Lycaenidae. It is found in south-western Malawi. The habitat consists of montane forests.

Adults have been recorded in September and October.
