= Axiocerses maureli =

Scientific classification
- Kingdom: Animalia
- Phylum: Arthropoda
- Class: Insecta
- Order: Lepidoptera
- Family: Lycaenidae
- Genus: Axiocerses
- Species: A. maureli

Binomial name
- Axiocerses maureli Dufrane, 1954

Species of butterfly

Axiocerses maureli is a butterfly in the family Lycaenidae. It is found in Ethiopia.
