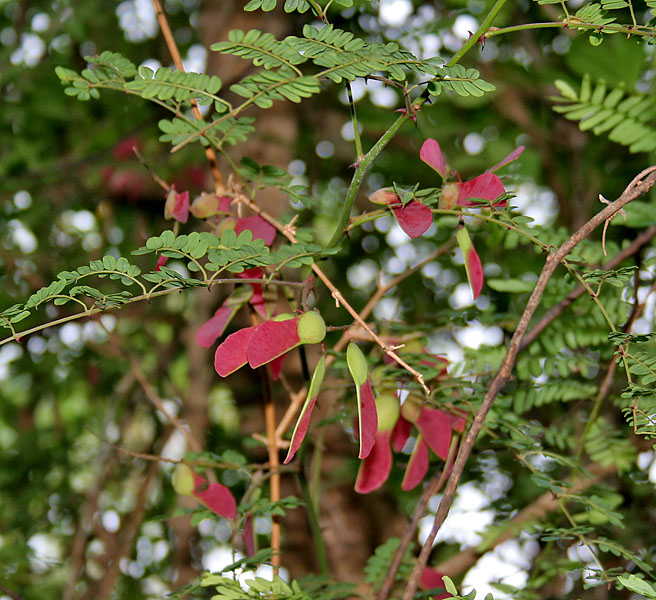
- The camp siege (P. hexapetalum) in India

Scientific classification
- Kingdom: Plantae
- Clade: Embryophytes
- Clade: Tracheophytes
- Clade: Angiosperms
- Clade: Eudicots
- Clade: Rosids
- Order: Fabales
- Family: Fabaceae
- Subfamily: Caesalpinioideae
- Tribe: Caesalpinieae
- Genus: Pterolobium; R.Br. ex Wight & Arn., (1834), nom. cons.

Type species
- Pterolobium stellatum (Forssk.) Brenan

Species
- See text

Synonyms
- Cantuffa J.F.Gmel. (1791); Kantuffa Bruce (1790); Quartinia A.Rich. (1840); Reichardia Roth (1821), nom. illeg.

= Pterolobium =

Genus of flowering plants

The genus, Pterolobium (from Gr. πτερόν pterón, meaning "wing", and λόβιον lóbion, meaning "pod" or "capsule", alluding to the winged fruit), consists of 10 species of perennial flowering plants in the family Fabaceae, subfamily Caesalpinioideae and tribe Caesalpinieae. They are sometimes called redwings and are native to the tropical to subtropical climes of Africa and Asia, including Indonesia and the Philippines. They are large scrambling or climbing shrubs that grow in riverside thickets, on rocky slopes or at forest margins. They bear colourful samara fruit, and have pairs of thorns below the rachis of their bipinnate leaves.

== Species ==
Pterolobium comprises the following species:

- Pterolobium borneense Merrill
- Pterolobium densiflorum Prain
- Pterolobium hexapetalum (Roth) Santapau & Wagh – camp siege
- Pterolobium integrum Craib
- Pterolobium macropterum Kurz (synonym P. sinense)
- Pterolobium membranulaceum (Blanco) Merrill
- Pterolobium micranthum Gagnep., emend. Craib
- Pterolobium microphyllum Miq.
- Pterolobium punctatum Hemsl.
- Pterolobium stellatum (Forssk.) Brenan – redwing (synonym P. lacerans)
