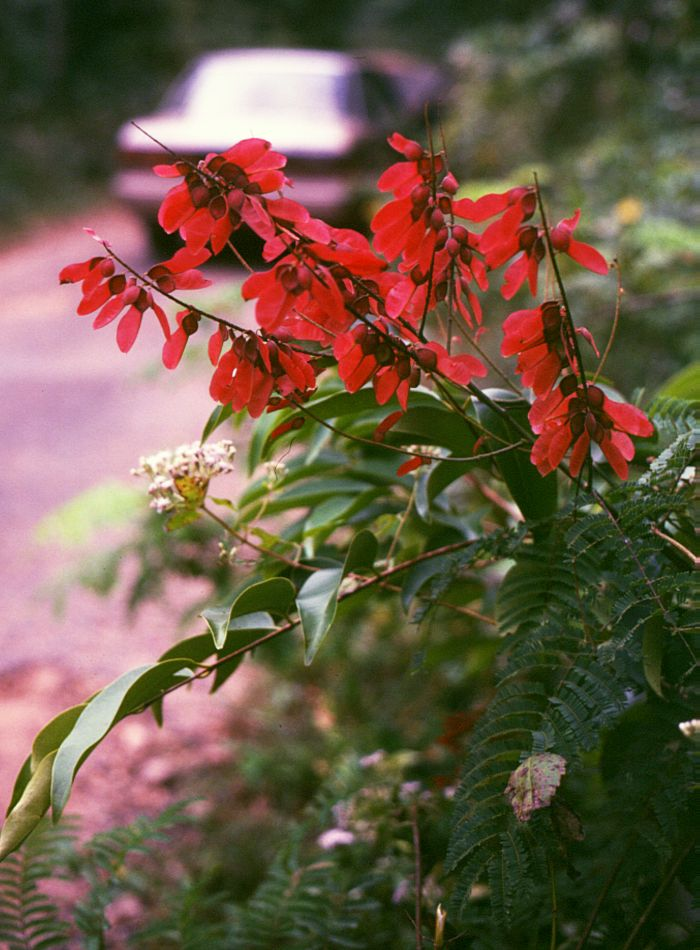
- Pterolobium microphyllum in southern Cambodia

Scientific classification
- Kingdom: Plantae
- Clade: Tracheophytes
- Clade: Angiosperms
- Clade: Eudicots
- Clade: Rosids
- Order: Fabales
- Family: Fabaceae
- Subfamily: Caesalpinioideae
- Genus: Pterolobium
- Species: P. microphyllum

Binomial name
- Pterolobium microphyllum Miq.

Synonyms
- Cantuffa microphylla (Miq.) Kuntze; P. densiflorum sensu auct.; P. indicum A. Rich. var. microphyllum (Miq.)Baker; P. insigne Miq.; P. platypterum Gagnep.; P. punctatum Hemsl. var. opacum Gagnep.; P. schmidtianum Harms

= Pterolobium microphyllum =

Species of legume

Pterolobium microphyllum is a flowering plant in the family Fabaceae. They are perennial climbing shrubs that occur from Burma eastwards to Thailand, Laos, Cambodia, Vietnam, Malaysia and Indonesia.

They bear erect creamy coloured inflorescences and colourful samaroid fruit typical of their genus, and have pairs of thorns below the rachis of their bipinnate leaves. The minute leaflets and the rachis have a rufous tone before they mature.
