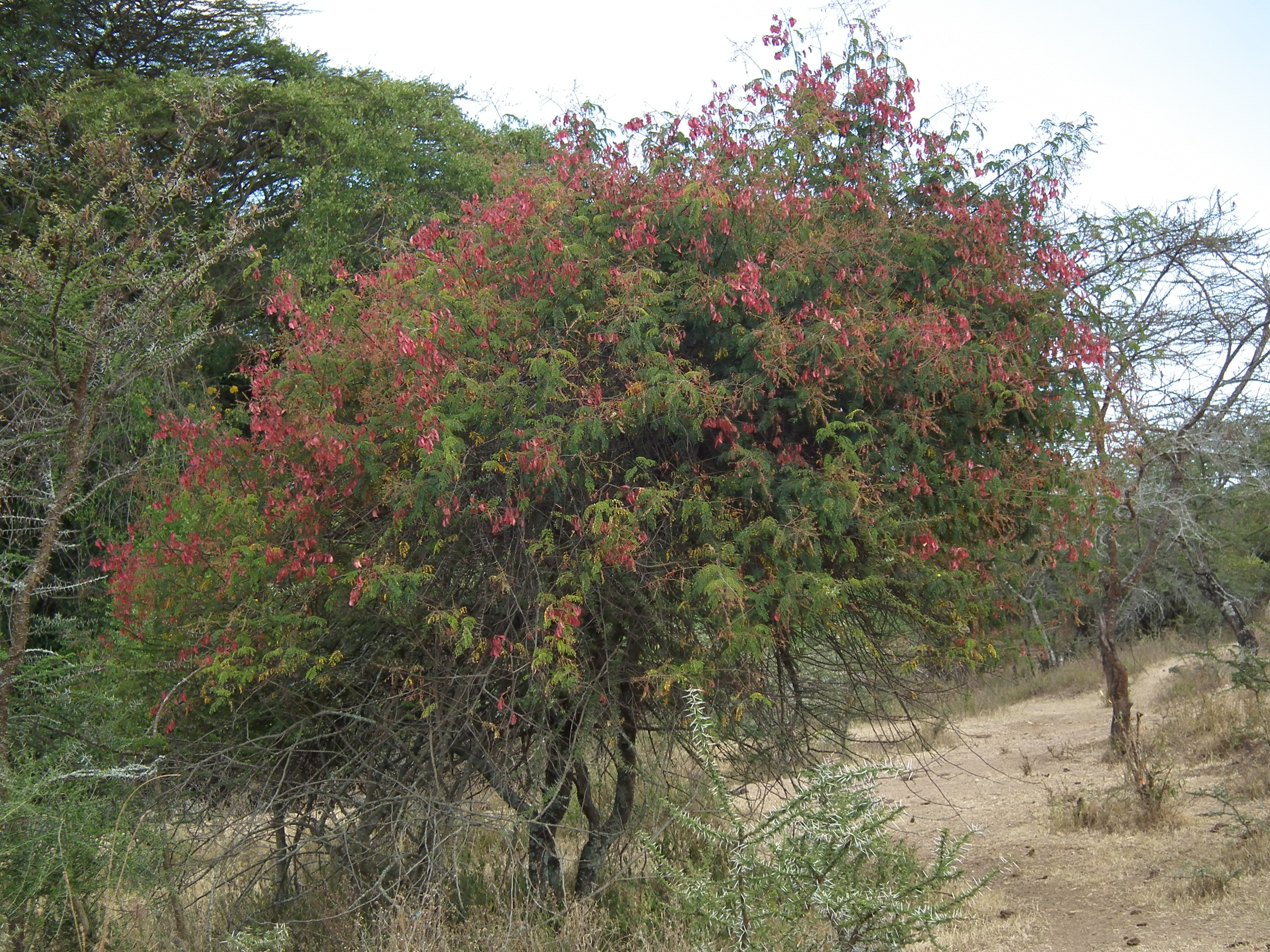
- In Tanzania

Scientific classification
- Kingdom: Plantae
- Clade: Tracheophytes
- Clade: Angiosperms
- Clade: Eudicots
- Clade: Rosids
- Order: Fabales
- Family: Fabaceae
- Subfamily: Caesalpinioideae
- Genus: Pterolobium
- Species: P. stellatum

Binomial name
- Pterolobium stellatum (Forssk.) Brenan

Synonyms
- Pterolobium exosum (J.F.Gmel.) E.G.Baker; Cantuffa exosa J.F.Gmel. 1791; Quartinia abyssinica A.Rich.; Pterolobium lacerans R. Br. ex Wight & Arn. 1814, nom. illeg.; Pterolobium kantuffa Wight & Arn. ex Steud.

= Pterolobium stellatum =

Redwing

Species of legume

Pterolobium stellatum (Latin: stellatum, starry or star-like, suggesting the radial arrangement of inflorescences), the redwing, is a perennial flowering plant in the legume family, Fabaceae.

== Range and habitat ==
It is the only member of the genus to occur in Africa, where it has an extensive but easterly range, from northern South Africa to Sudan, Ethiopia and on to Yemen in the Arabian Peninsula. They are found on rocky slopes and kopjes, riparian floodplains, or along forest margins.

== Description ==
Young plants are hairy on the stems and leaves, while mature plants have scrambling rope-like branches that are armed with recurved thorns or conical knobs. The alternate and bipinnately compound leaves consist of 5 to 13 paired primary leaflets (pinnae), and 7 to 16 paired leaflets per pinna. The underside of the rachis carries pairs of recurved thorns, or solitary straight ones.

They produce cream-coloured inflorescences composed of dense compound racemes (panicles). These are sweetly scented and attract quantities of bees and butterflies. They produce colourful brick-red to scarlet samaroid fruit, typical of their genus, which turn brown with age. The species may be confused with Caesalpinia decapetala, which however has larger yellow flowers, and clusters of brown seed pods.

== Uses ==
The shrubs are planted to provide impenetrable live fences, and shoots are collected for livestock fodder. In Ethiopia an infusion of the pounded bark has been used as a component in tanning leather, while providing it with a red colour. The leaves contain 20% tannin and yield a dark red dye when crushed, which has been used in textiles, basketry and as an ingredient in black ink. The plant is employed in traditional medicine, though its medicinal properties have not been formally investigated.

== Local names ==
- Amharic: kanteftef
- Tigrinya: ቆንጠፍጠፎ (qontaftafo)

(The ethiopic names are in line with the first scientific name of the species Cantuffa exosa J.F.Gmel. 1791)

- nickname: forget-me-not-bush
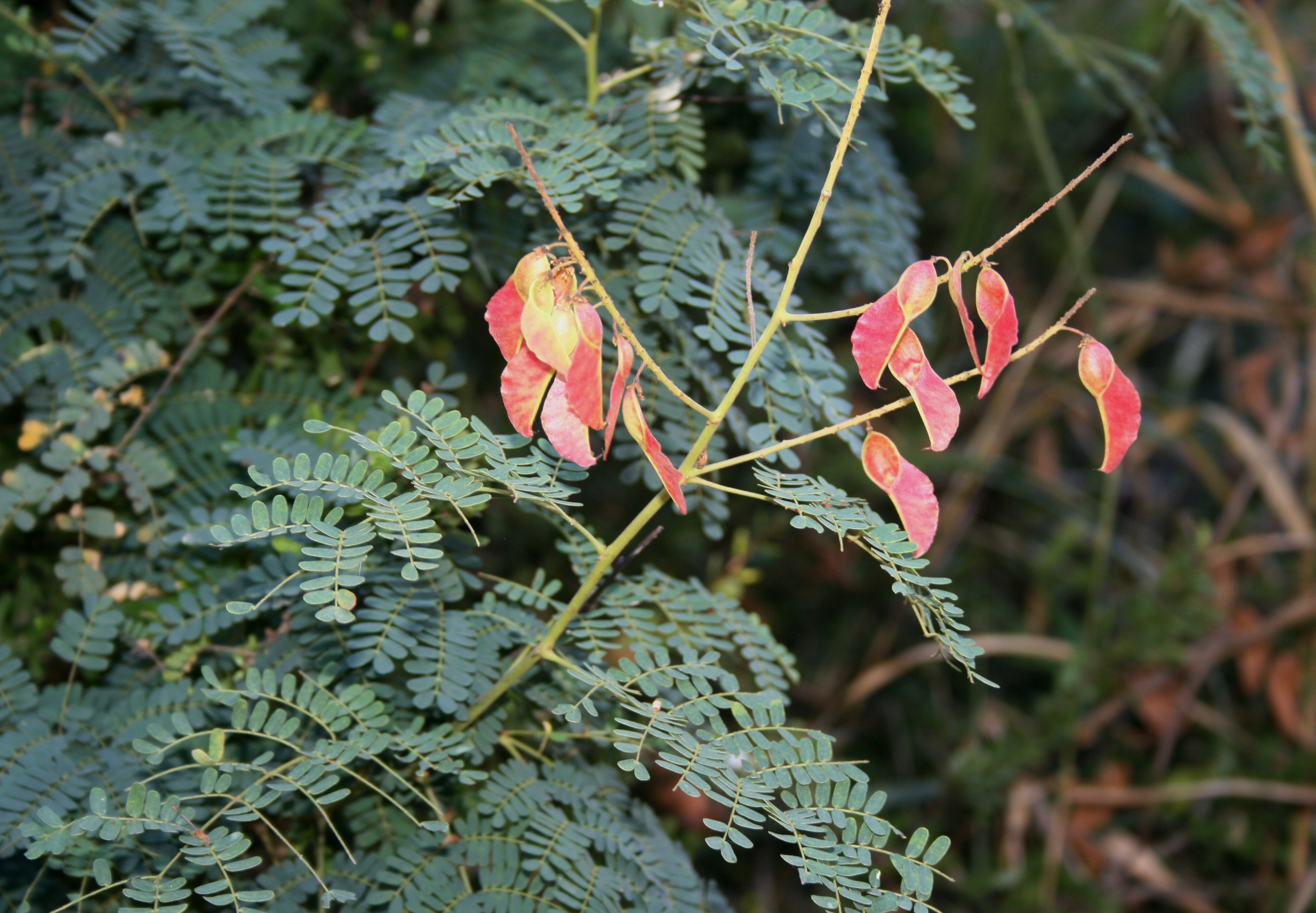
Fruit and foliage

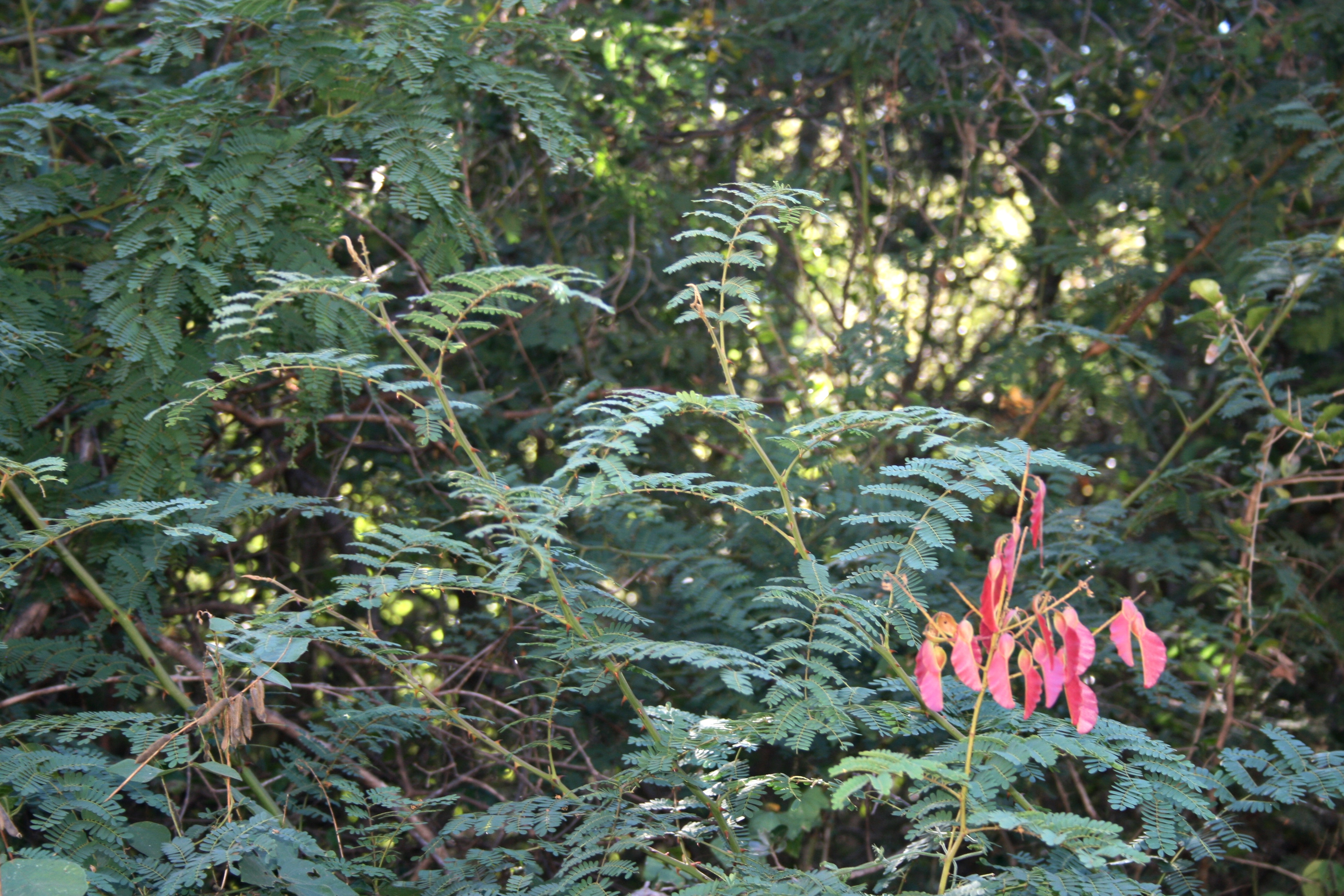
Armed stems and leaf rachides

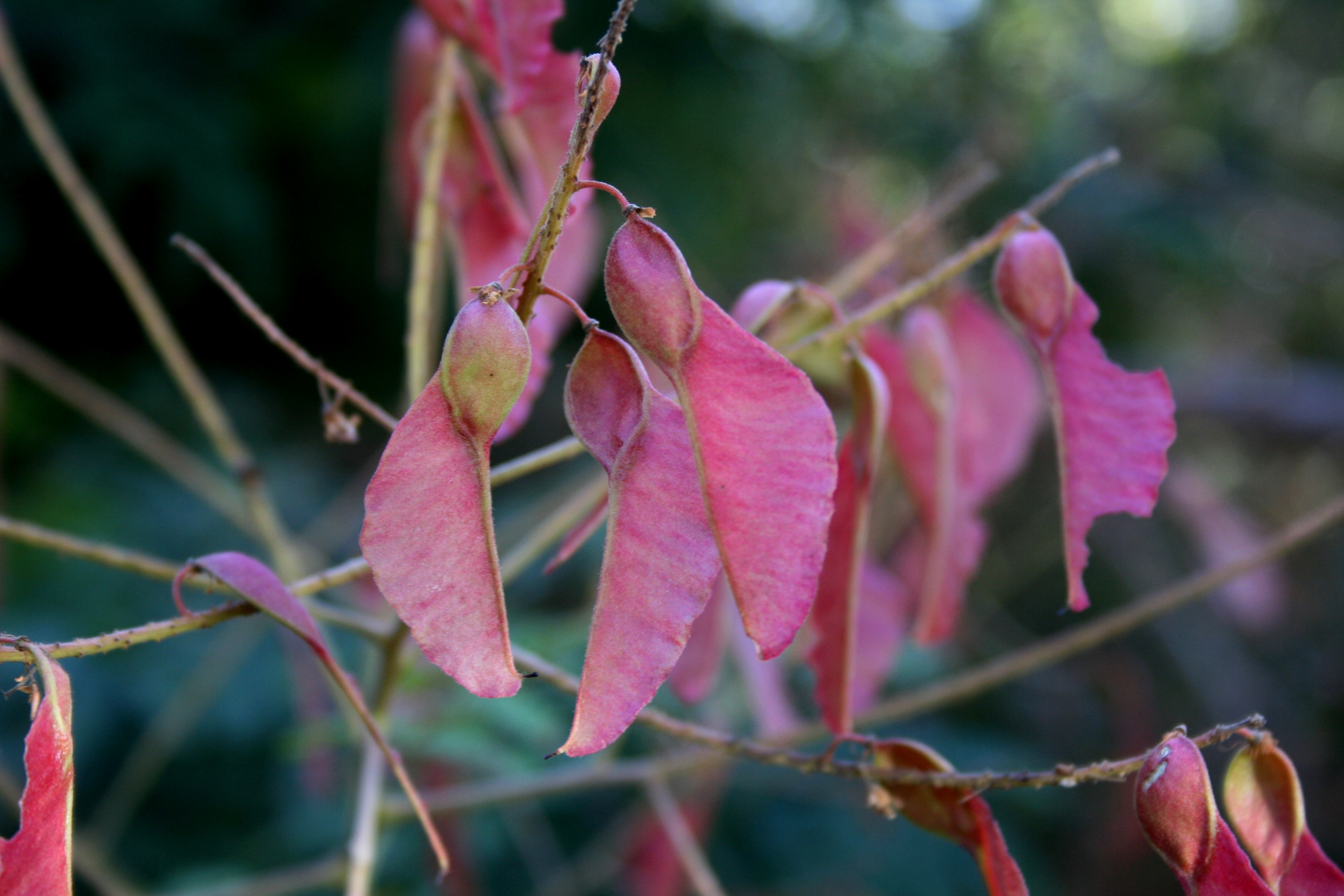
Close-up of the red samaras, winter
