= Pterolobium membranulaceum =

Scientific classification
- Kingdom: Plantae
- Clade: Tracheophytes
- Clade: Angiosperms
- Clade: Eudicots
- Clade: Rosids
- Order: Fabales
- Family: Fabaceae
- Subfamily: Caesalpinioideae
- Genus: Pterolobium
- Species: P. membranulaceum

Binomial name
- Pterolobium membranulaceum (Blanco) Merr.

Synonyms
- Reichardia pentapetala Blanco; Pterolobium indicum "sensu auct., non A.Rich., Fer"; Mimosa membranulaceae Blanco

Species of flowering plant

Pterolobium membranulaceum is a flowering plant in the legume family, Fabaceae. The woody vine is endemic to secondary forest of the Philippines. Its general appearance is comparable to others of its genus, with bipinnate leaves and rufous samara fruit. The pubescent petiole and leaf rachis vary between 10 and 21 cm (3.9 and 8.3 in) in length. The leaves carry 5 to 10 pairs of pinnae, with 6 to 8 pairs of oblong leaflets per pinna. The pubescent and loosely flowered inflorescences are borne on the side or tips of branches.
