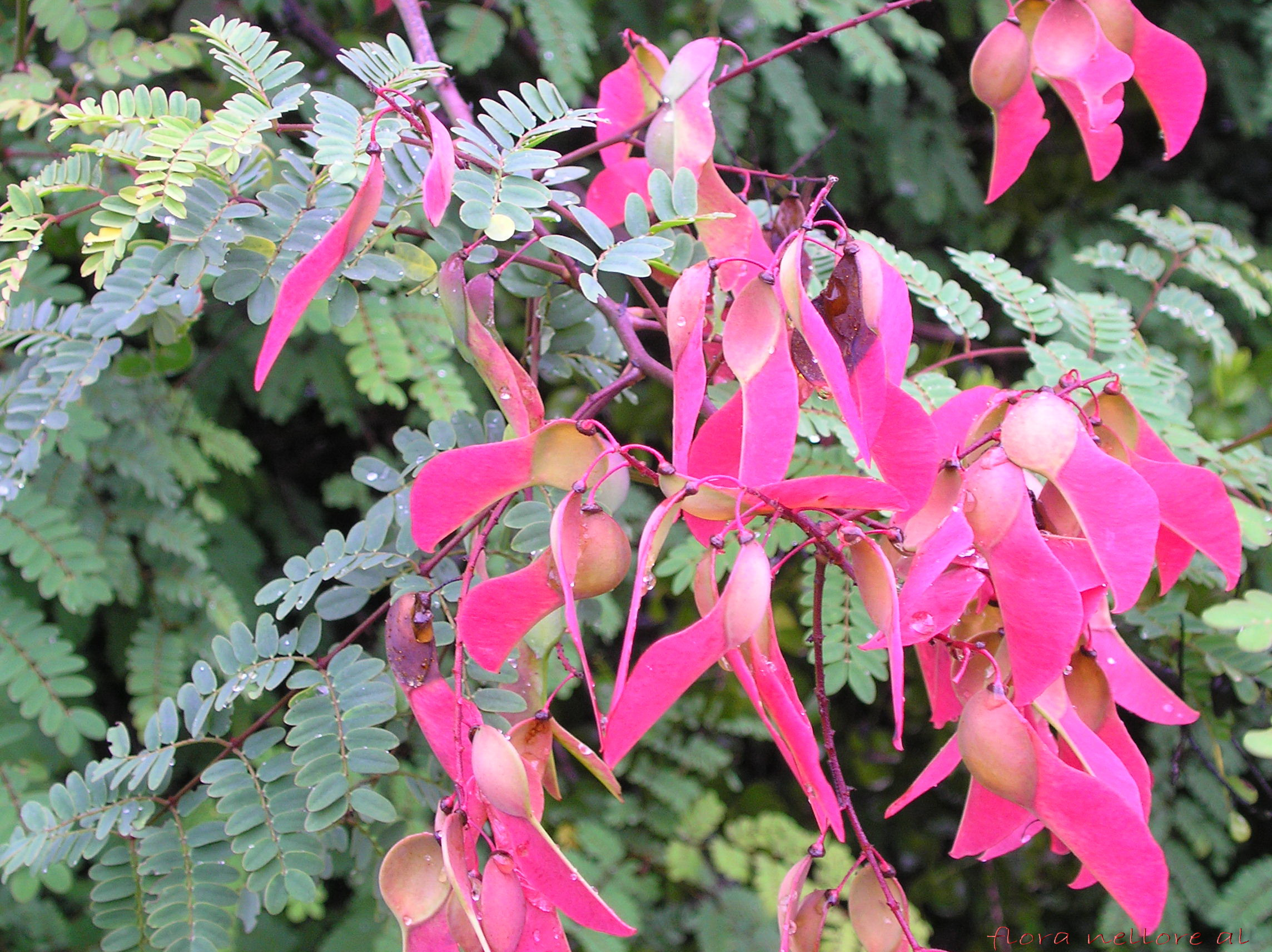
- In India

Scientific classification
- Kingdom: Plantae
- Clade: Tracheophytes
- Clade: Angiosperms
- Clade: Eudicots
- Clade: Rosids
- Order: Fabales
- Family: Fabaceae
- Subfamily: Caesalpinioideae
- Genus: Pterolobium
- Species: P. hexapetalum

Binomial name
- Pterolobium hexapetalum (Roth) Santapau & Wagh

Synonyms
- Caesalpinia lacerans Roxb.; Caesalpinia ligulata DC.; Cantuffa hexapetala (Roth) Kuntze; Cantuffa lacerans (Roxb.) Taub.; P. indicum A.Rich.; P. lacerans auct. non R. Br.; Reichardia hexapetala Roth

= Pterolobium hexapetalum =

Species of legume

Pterolobium hexapetalum, the Indian redwing, camp siege or bhoca, is a flowering plant in the legume family, Fabaceae. It is found from Burma, Bhutan and Bangladesh to southern India, where it occurs up to 1200 m altitude. They are large scrambling or climbing shrubs that grow commonly in dry deciduous forest, or as pioneer plants in open land.

They carry pairs of thorns below the rachis of their bipinnate leaves, and their sprawling twigs are armed with recurved thorns. In springtime their profuse and attractive inflorescences of pinkish white flowers form a mat on tree canopies. Starting March to April, they present a major source of nectar and pollen, and are foraged on by different species of honey bee. In late summer they bear colourful samaroid fruit, containing one seed each. The young shoots are useful as cattle fodder.
