= List of butterflies of South Africa =

Location of South Africa

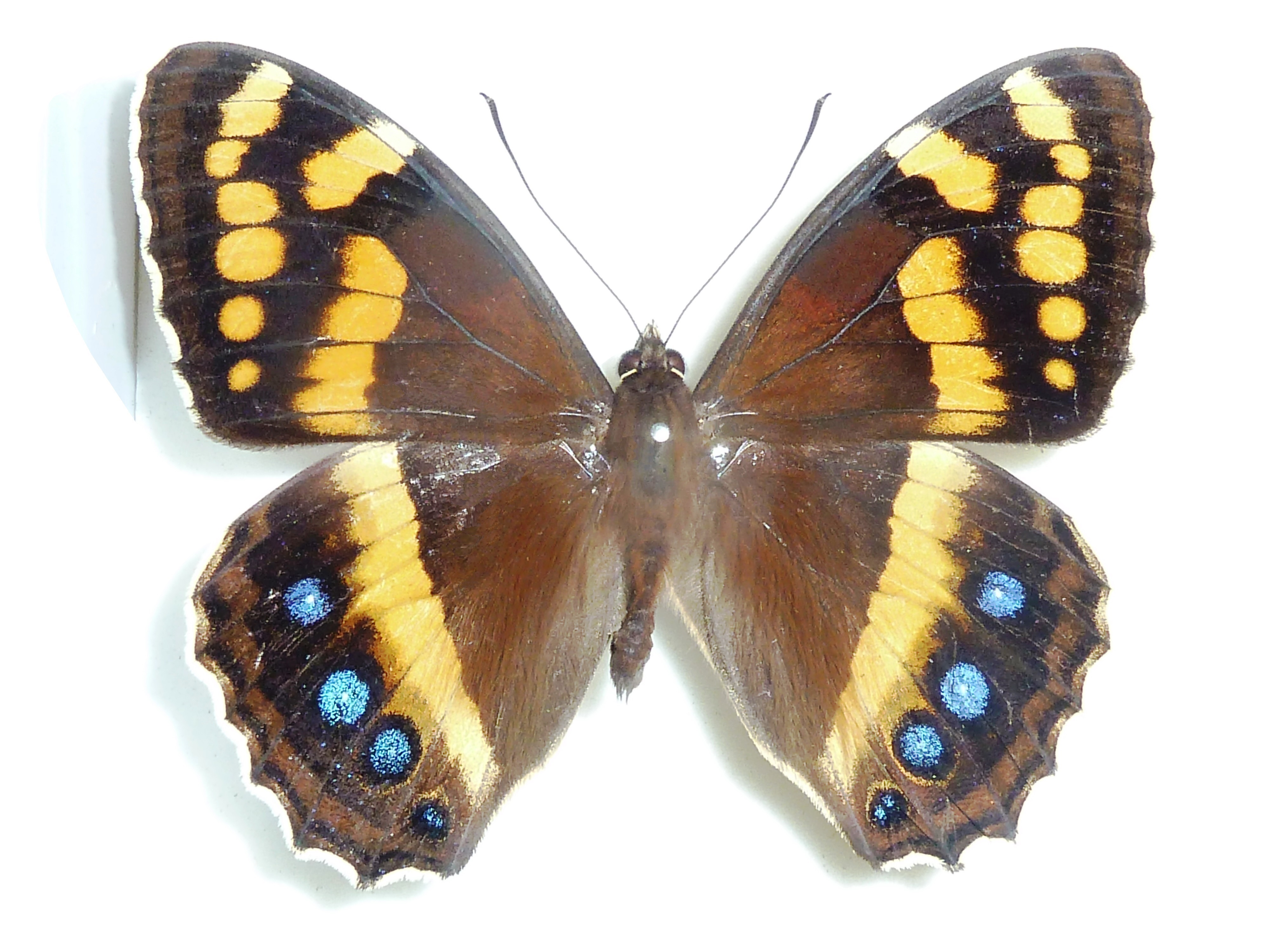
Table Mountain beauty Aeropetes tulbaghia mounted specimen

This is a list of butterflies of South Africa. Over 660 species are known from South Africa, a large proportion of which are endemic.

== Family Nymphalidae ==
=== Subfamily Danainae ===
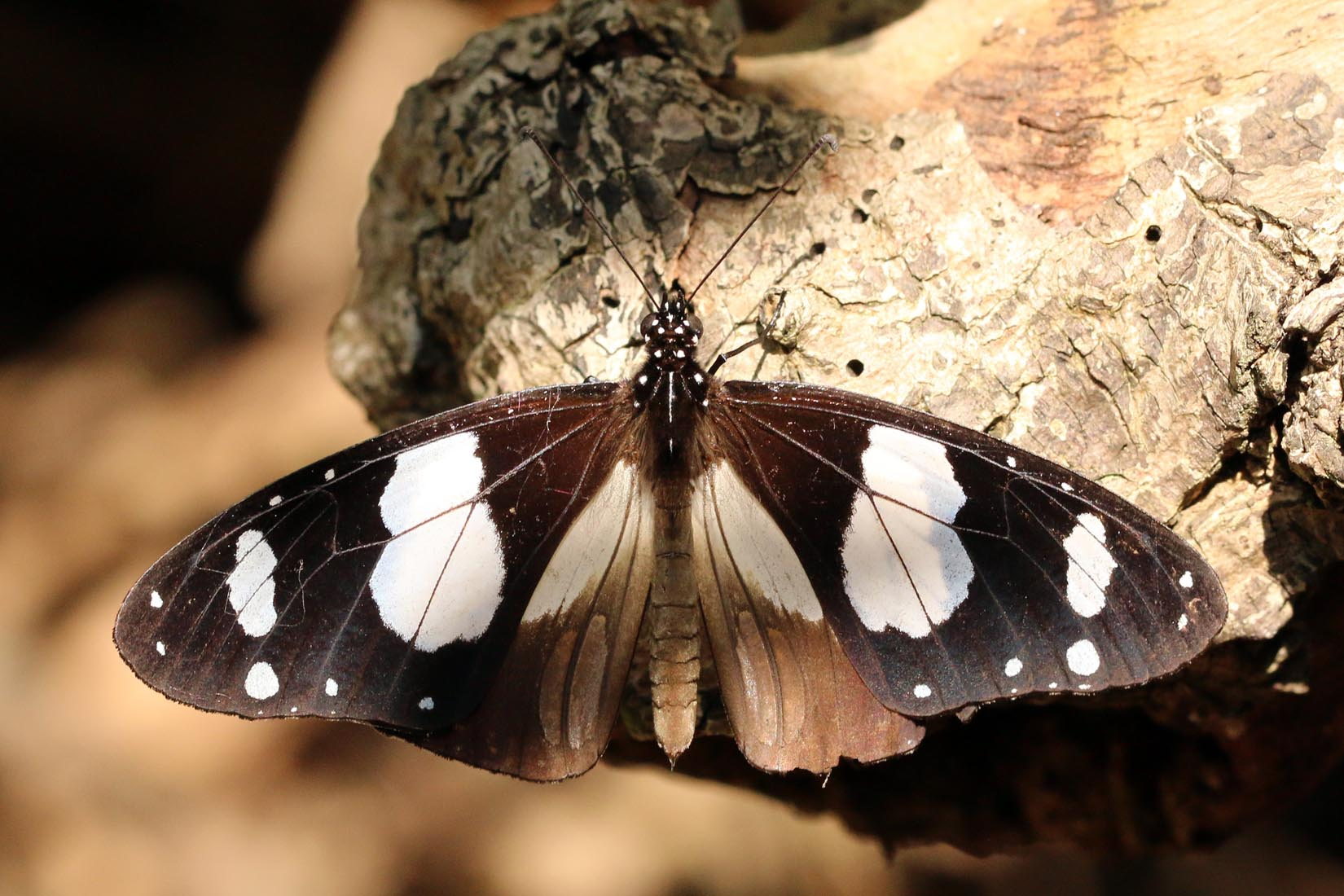
Male Amauris ochlea

- Amauris albimaculata
- Amauris echeria
- Amauris niavius
- Amauris ochlea
- Danaus chrysippus
- Tirumala petiverana

=== Subfamily Satyrinae ===
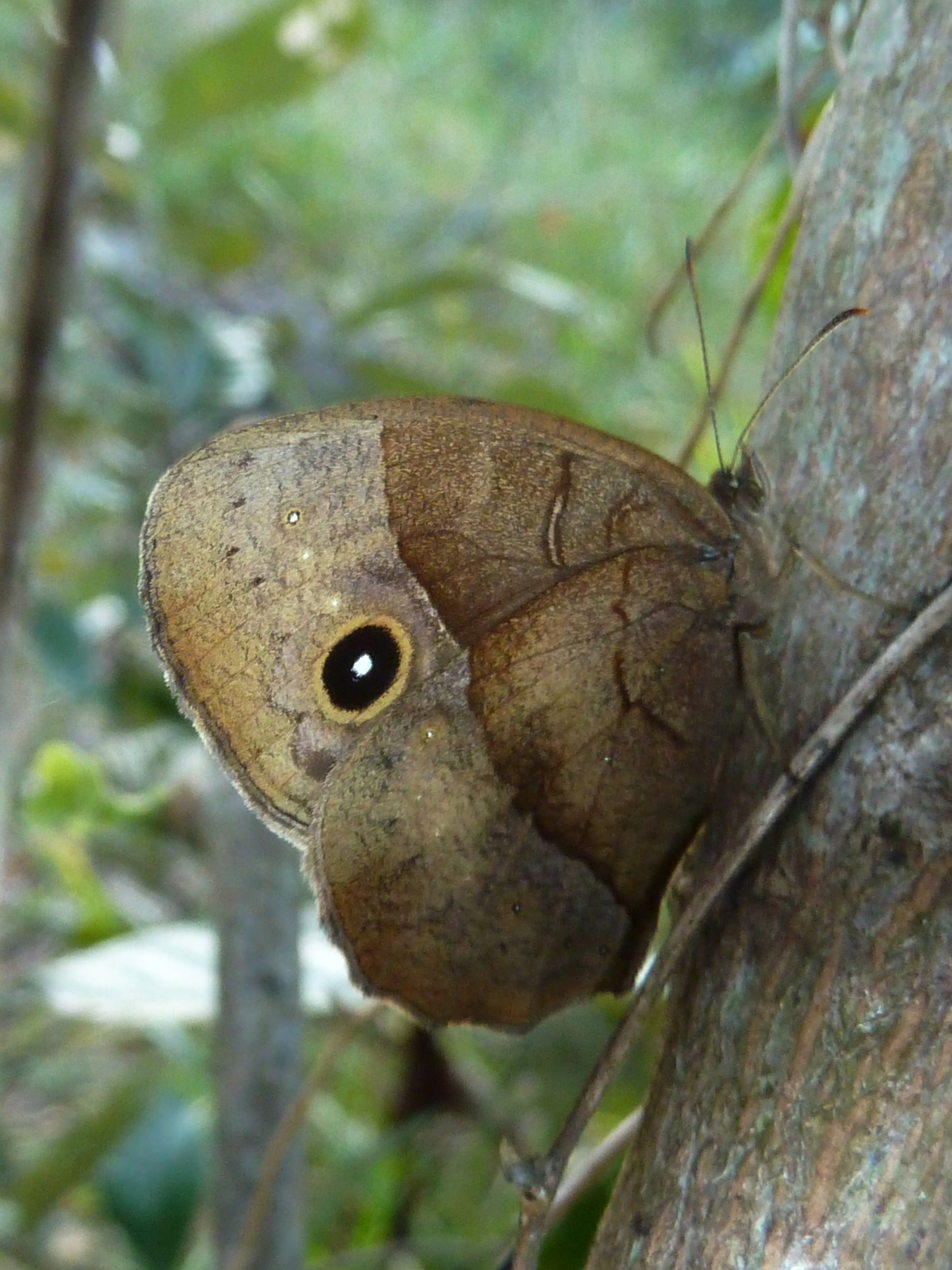
Bicyclus safitza

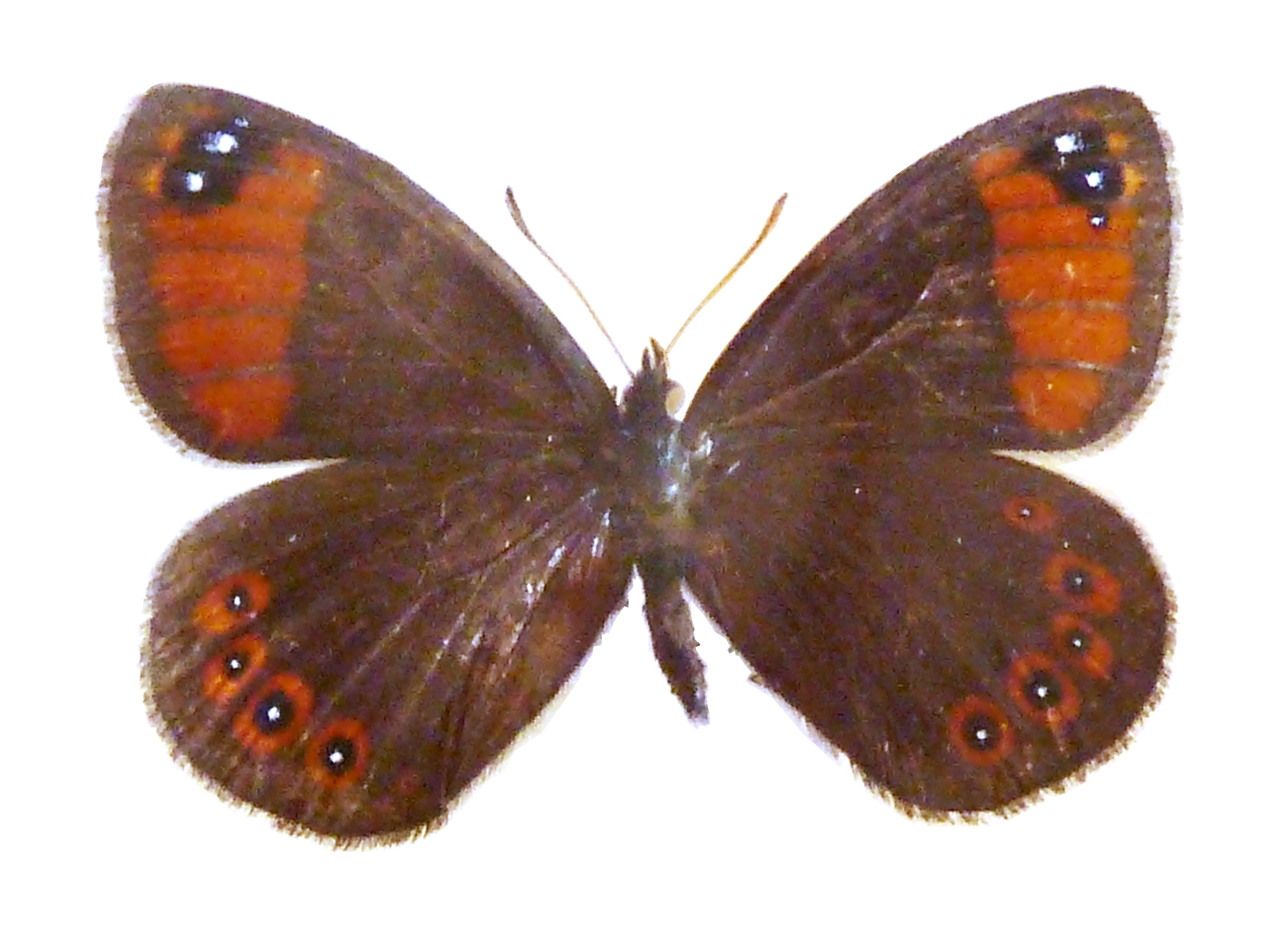
Dingana alaedeus

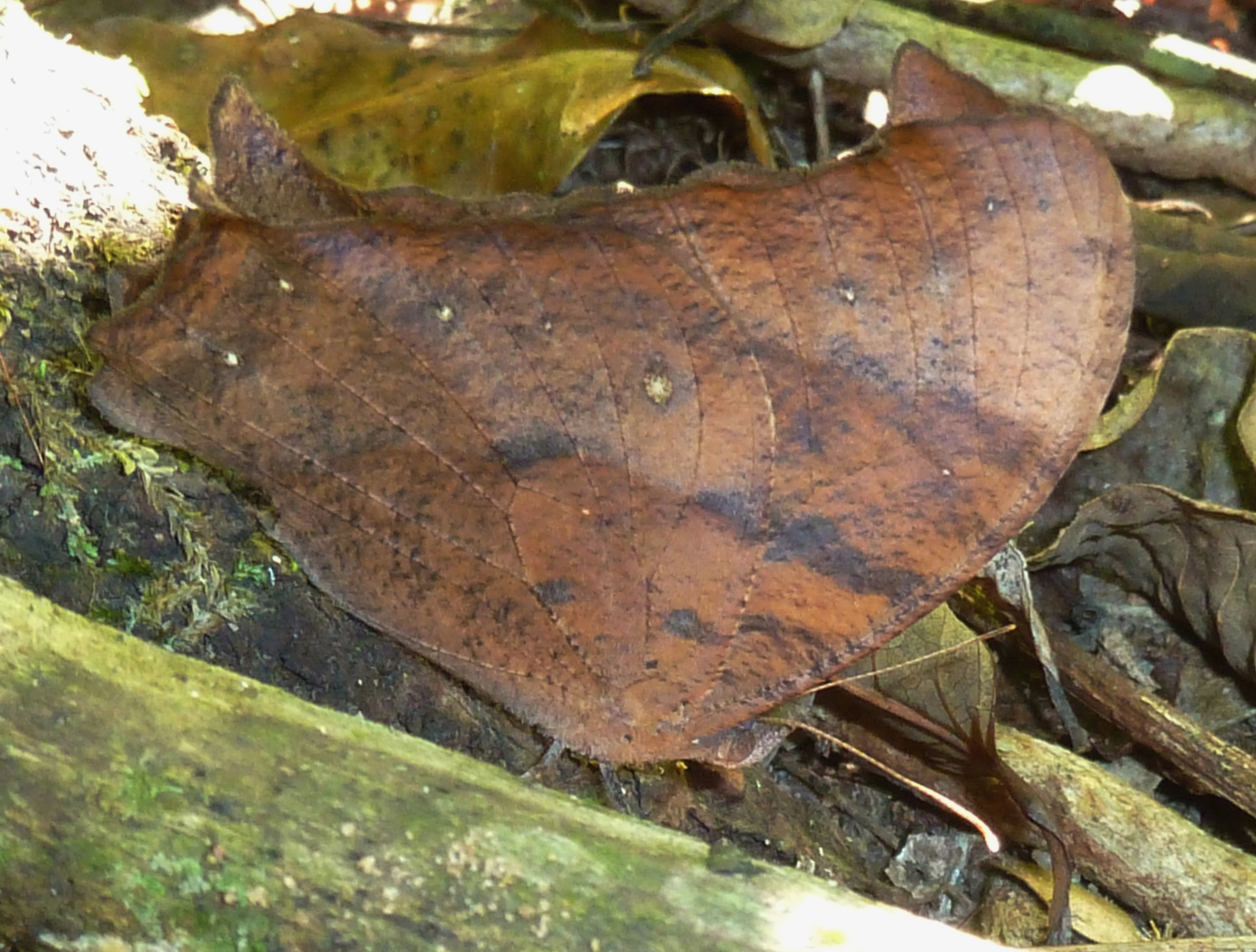
Melanitis leda

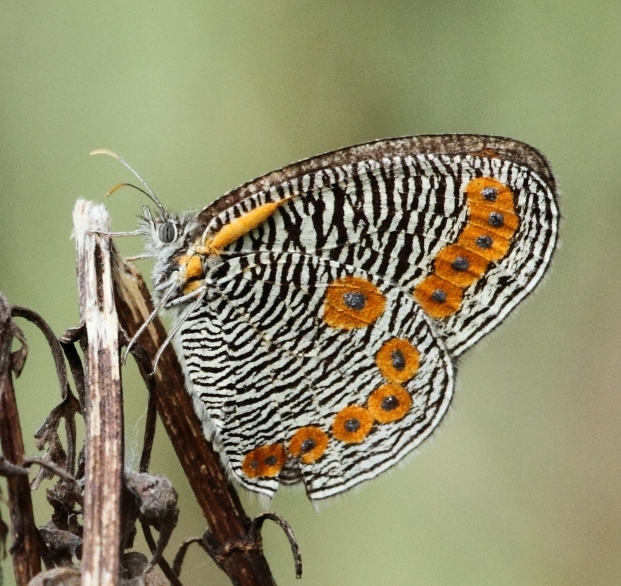
Physcaeneura panda

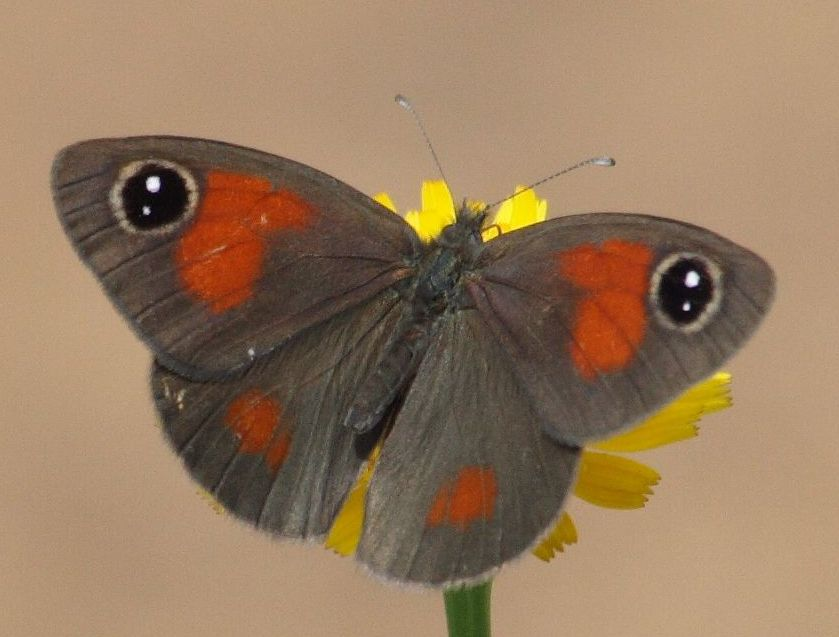
Stygionympha wichgrafi

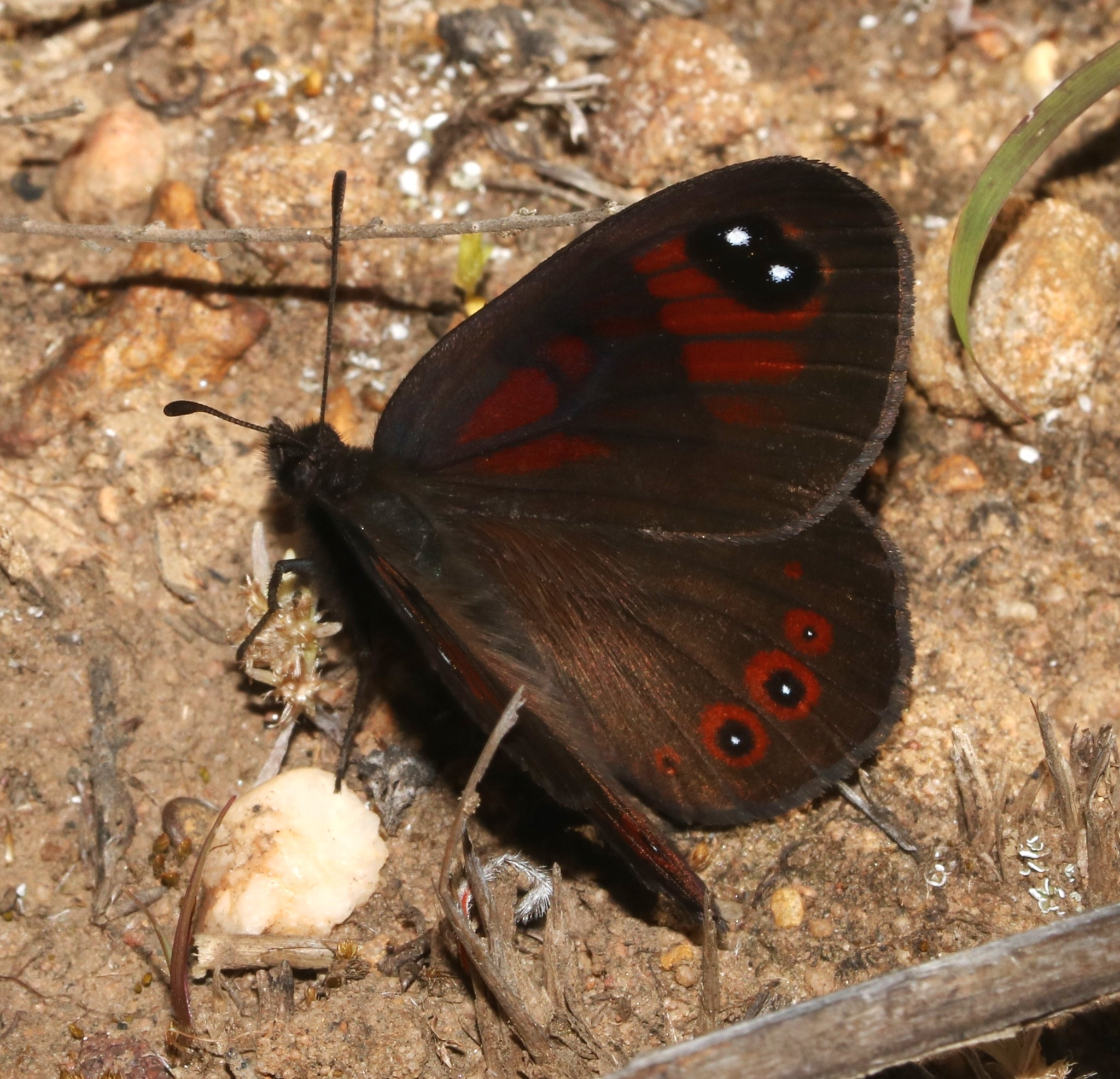
Tarsocera cassus

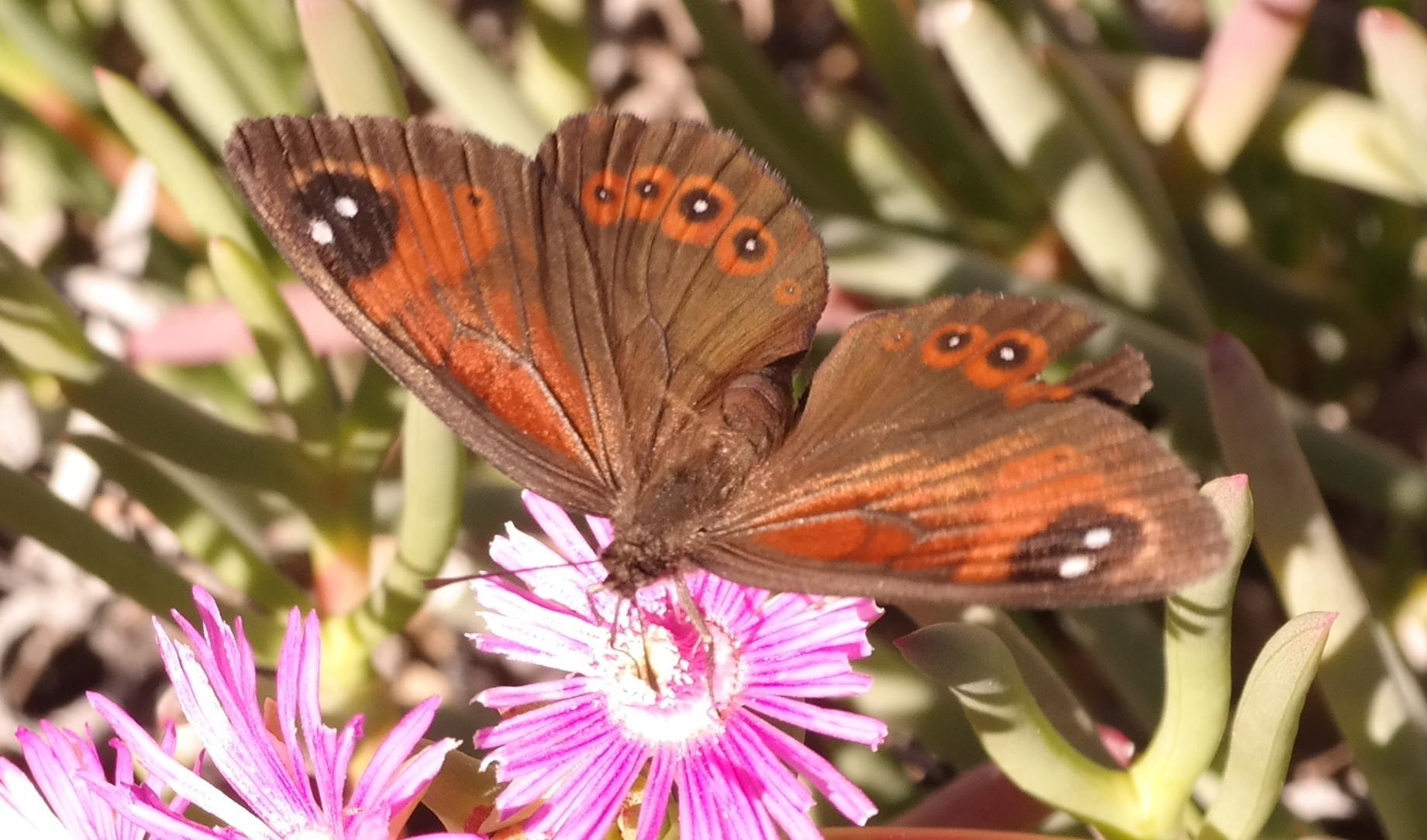
Tarsocera dicksoni

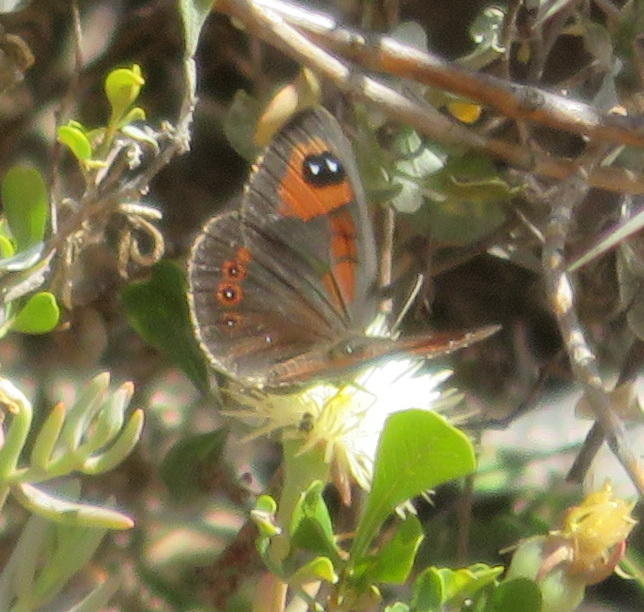
Tarsocera fulvina

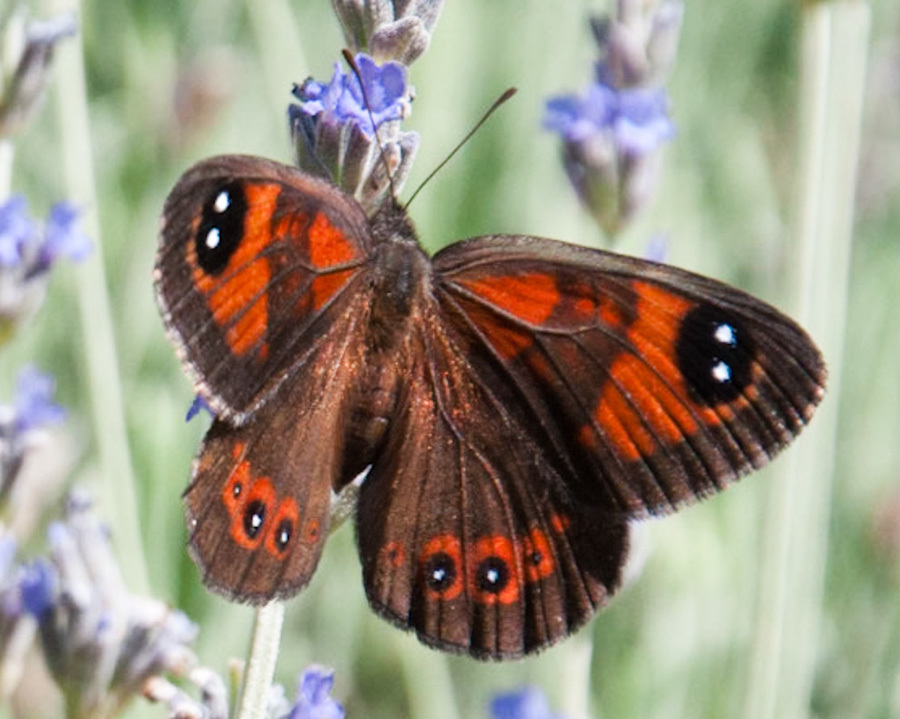
Tarsocera namaquensis

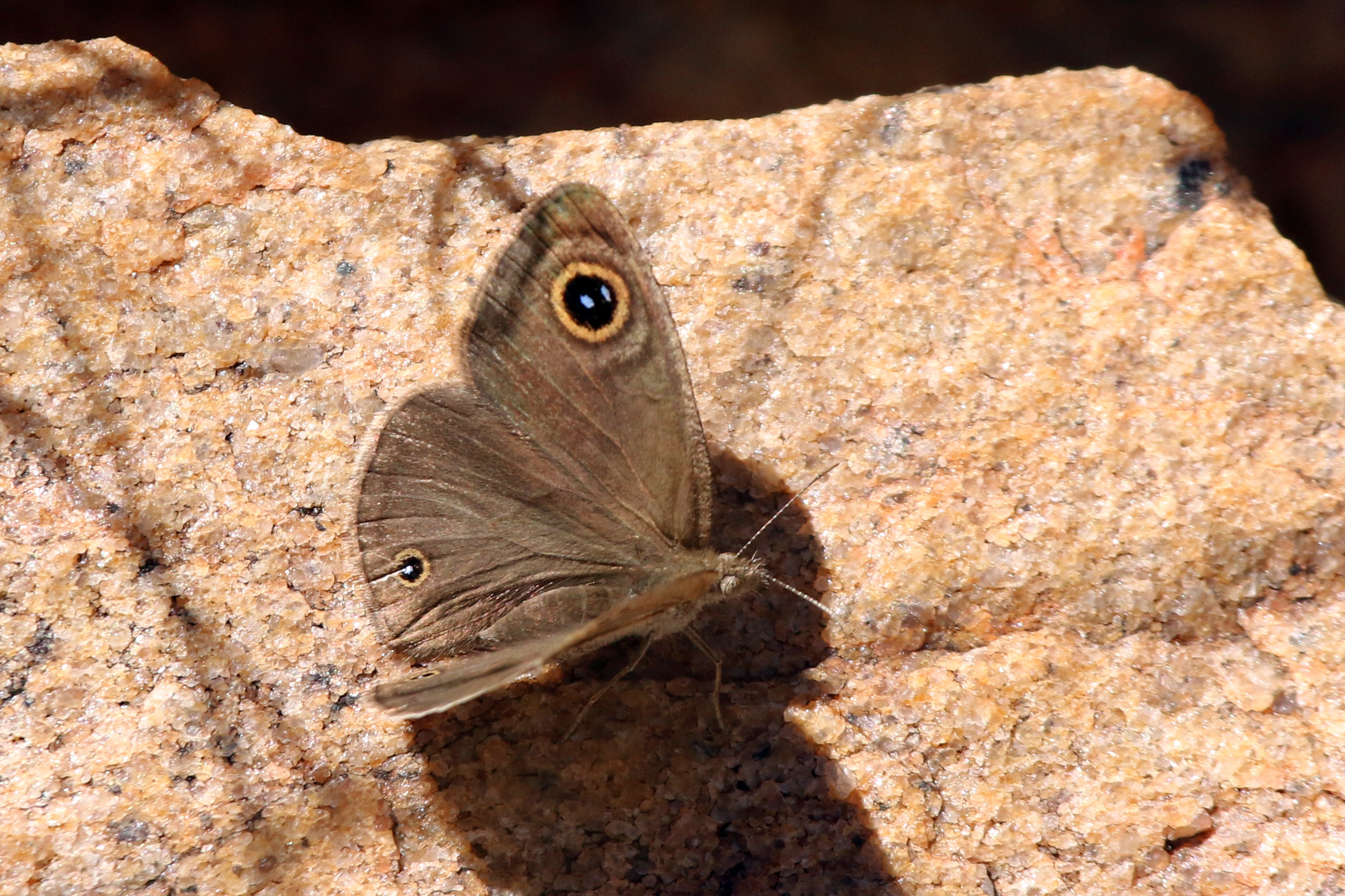
Ypthima asterope

- Aeropetes tulbaghia
- Bicyclus anynana
- Bicyclus ena
- Bicyclus safitza
- Cassionympha camdeboo
- Cassionympha cassius
- Cassionympha detecta
- Coenyra aurantiaca
- Coenyra hebe
- Coenyra rufiplaga
- Coenyropsis natalii
- Dingana alaedeus
- Dingana alticola
- Dingana angusta
- Dingana bowkeri
- Dingana clara
- Dingana clarki
- Dingana dingana
- Dingana fraterna
- Dingana jerinae
- Dingana kammanassiensis
- Dira clytus
- Dira jansei
- Dira oxylus
- Dira swanepoeli
- Gnophodes betsimena
- Heteropsis perspicua
- Melampias huebneri
- Melanitis leda
- Neita durbani
- Neita extensa
- Neita lotenia
- Neita neita
- Paralethe dendrophilus
- Physcaeneura panda
- Pseudonympha gaika
- Pseudonympha hippia
- Pseudonympha loxophthalma
- Pseudonympha machacha
- Pseudonympha magoides
- Pseudonympha magus
- Pseudonympha narycia
- Pseudonympha paludis
- Pseudonympha paragaika
- Pseudonympha penningtoni
- Pseudonympha poetula
- Pseudonympha southeyi
- Pseudonympha swanepoeli
- Pseudonympha trimenii
- Pseudonympha varii
- Stygionympha curlei
- Stygionympha dicksoni
- Stygionympha geraldi
- Stygionympha irrorata
- Stygionympha robertsoni
- Stygionympha scotina
- Stygionympha vansoni
- Stygionympha vigilans
- Stygionympha wichgrafi
- Tarsocera cassina
- Tarsocera cassus
- Tarsocera dicksoni
- Tarsocera fulvina
- Tarsocera imitator
- Tarsocera namaquensis
- Tarsocera southeyae
- Torynesis hawequas
- Torynesis magna
- Torynesis mintha
- Torynesis orangica
- Torynesis pringlei
- Ypthima antennata
- Ypthima asterope
- Ypthima condamini
- Ypthima granulosa
- Ypthima impura

=== Subfamily Heliconiinae ===
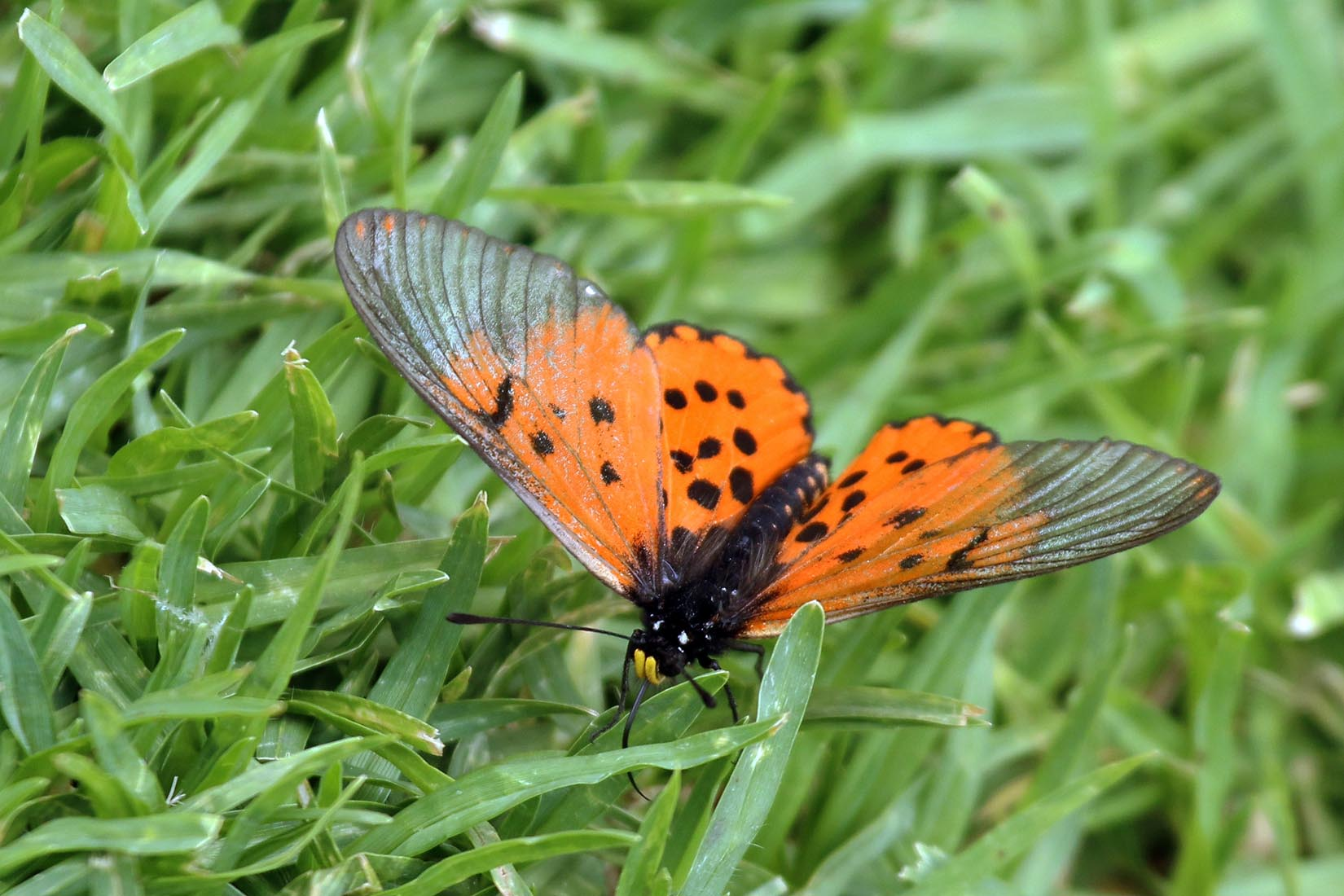
Male Acraea horta

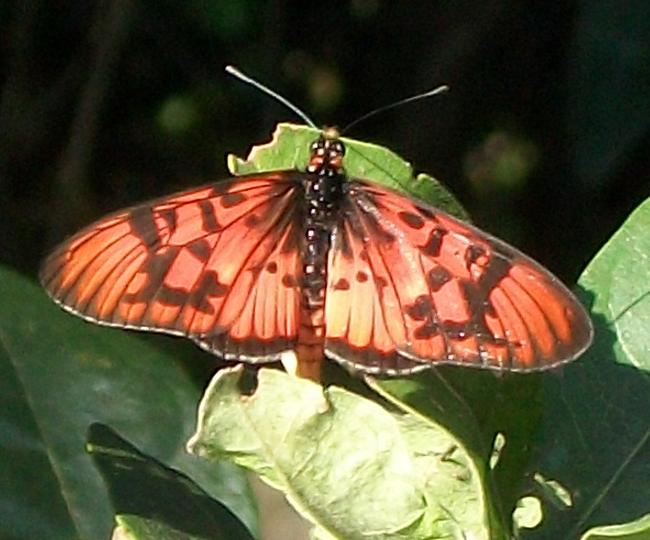
Male Acraea petraea

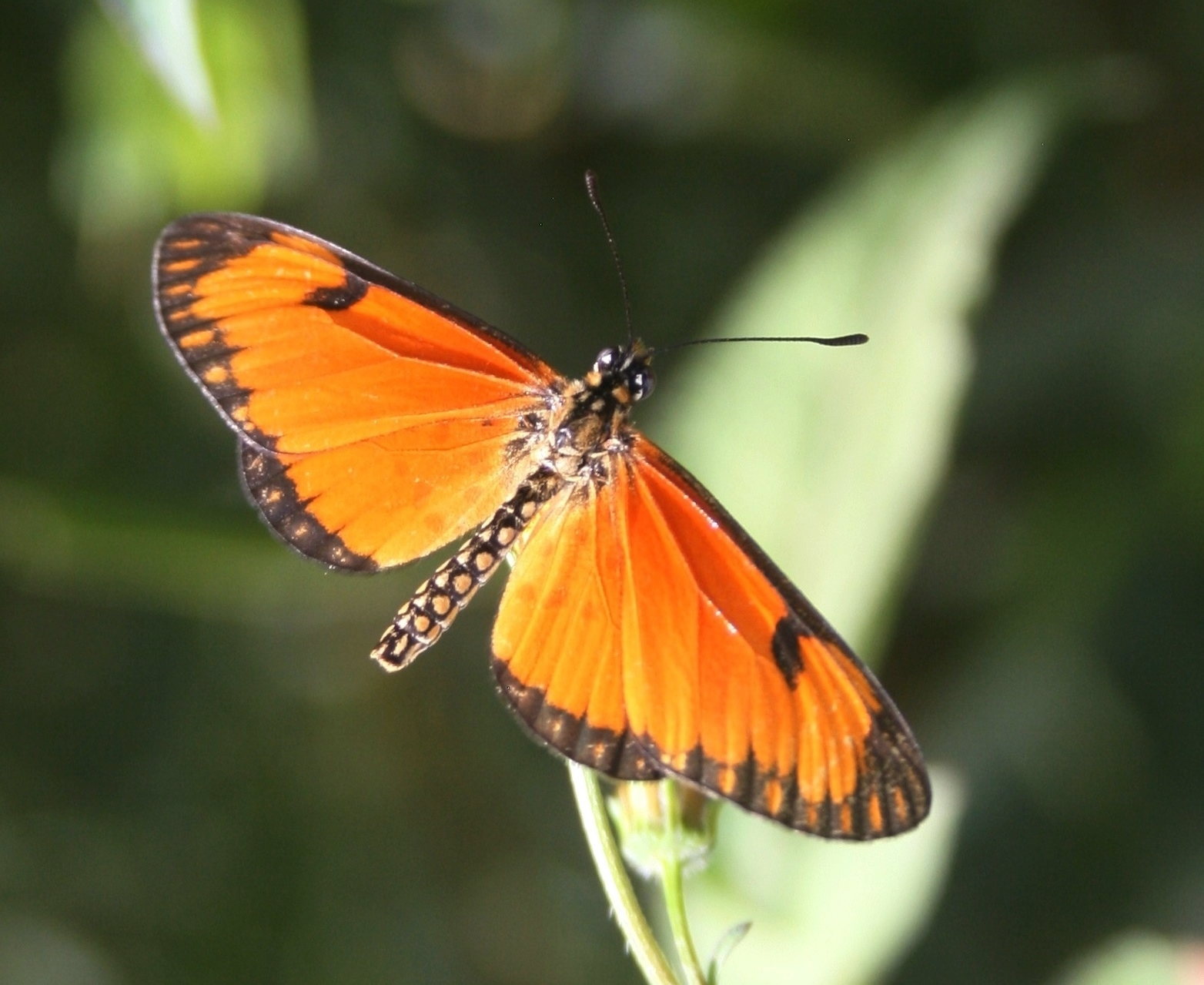
Hyalites eponina

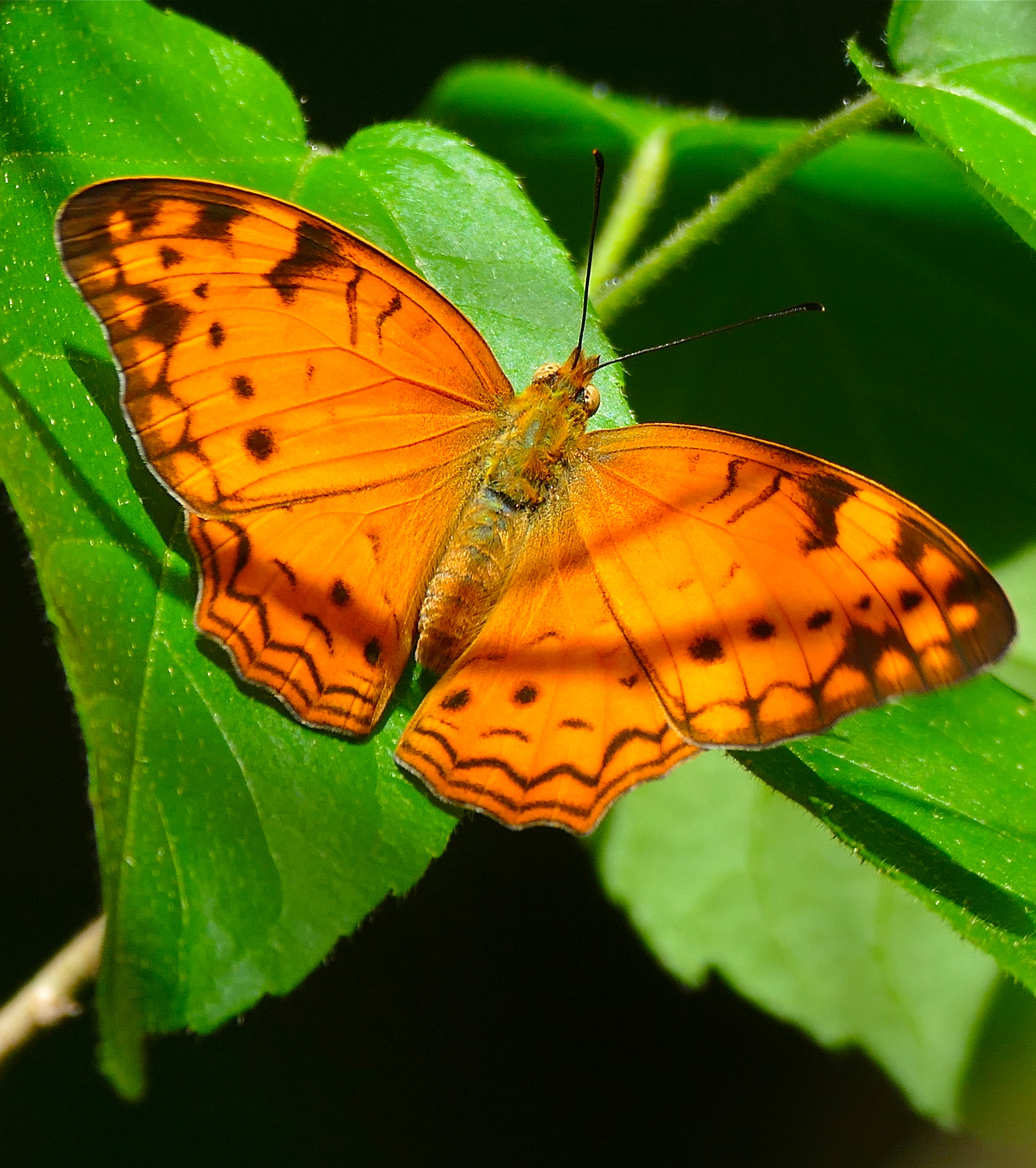
Lachnoptera ayresii

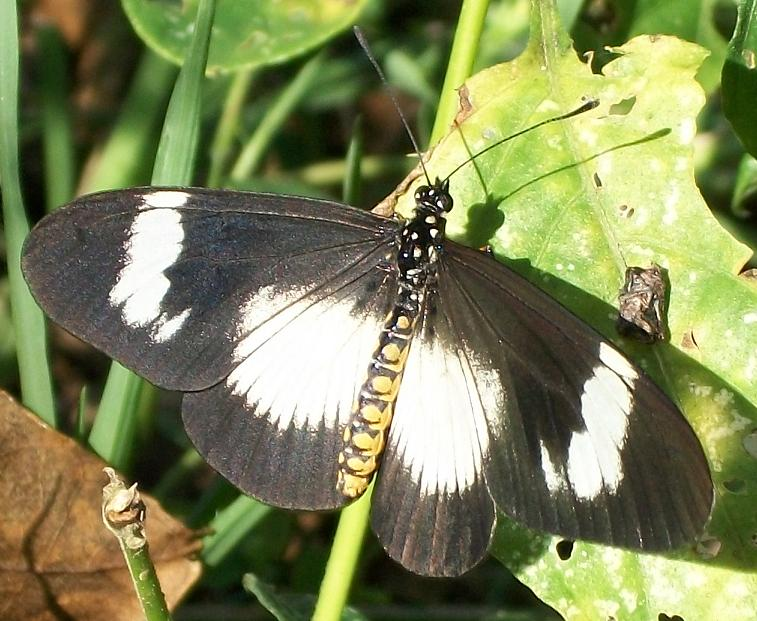
Telchinia esebria

- Acraea acara
- Acraea acrita
- Acraea aglaonice
- Acraea anemosa
- Acraea axina
- Acraea barberi
- Acraea boopis
- Acraea caldarena
- Acraea horta
- Acraea lygus
- Acraea machequena
- Acraea natalica
- Acraea neobule
- Acraea nohara
- Acraea oncaea
- Acraea petraea
- Acraea rabbaiae
- Acraea satis
- Acraea stenobea
- Acraea trimeni
- Acraea violarum
- Bematistes aganice
- Hyalites cerasa
- Hyalites eponina
- Hyalites obeira
- Lachnoptera ayresii
- Pardopsis punctatissima
- Phalanta eurytis
- Phalanta phalantha
- Telchinia alalonga
- Telchinia anacreon
- Telchinia cabira
- Telchinia encedon
- Telchinia esebria
- Telchinia igola
- Telchinia induna
- Telchinia rahira
- Telchinia serena

=== Subfamily Charaxinae ===
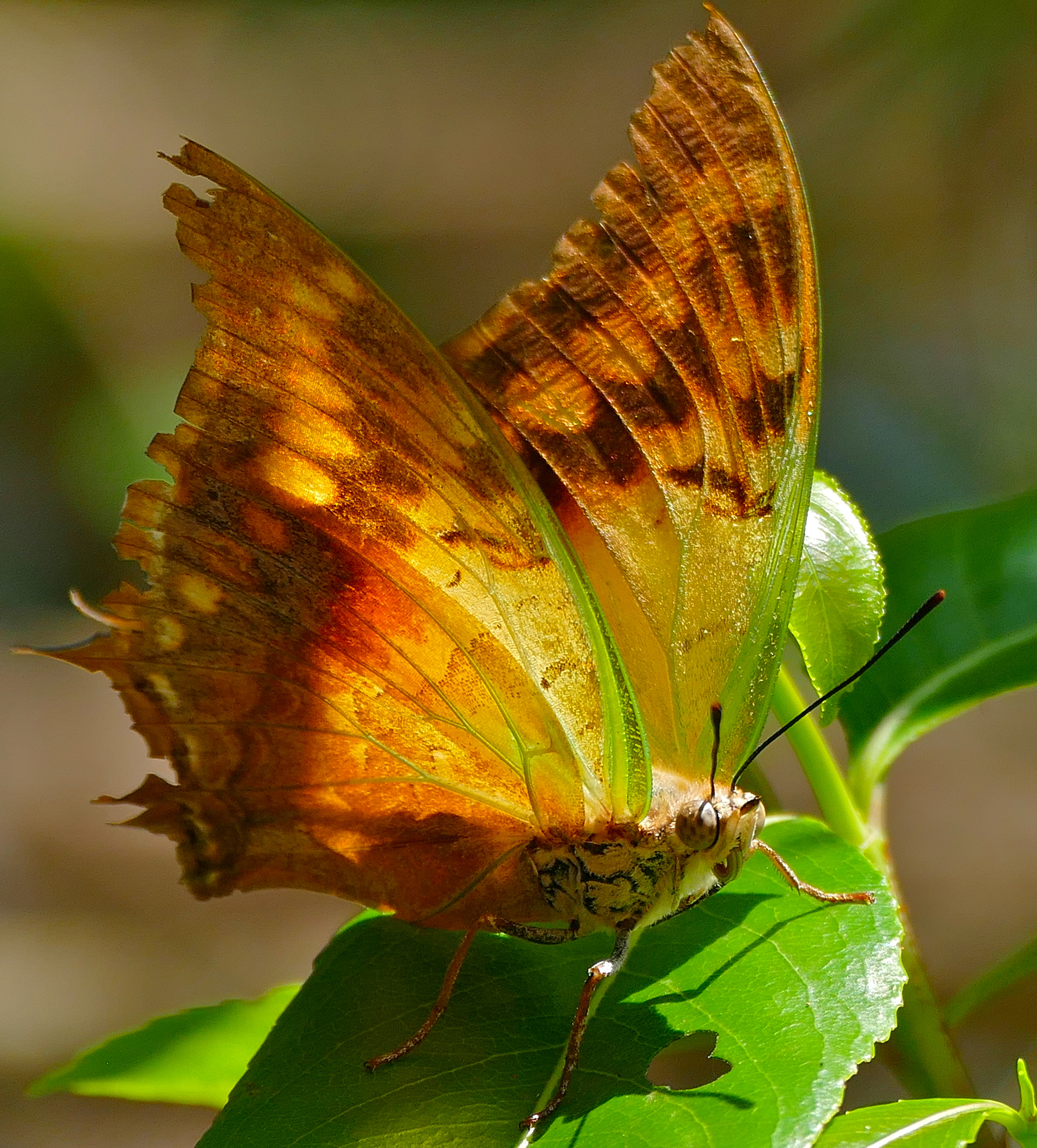
Charaxes candiope

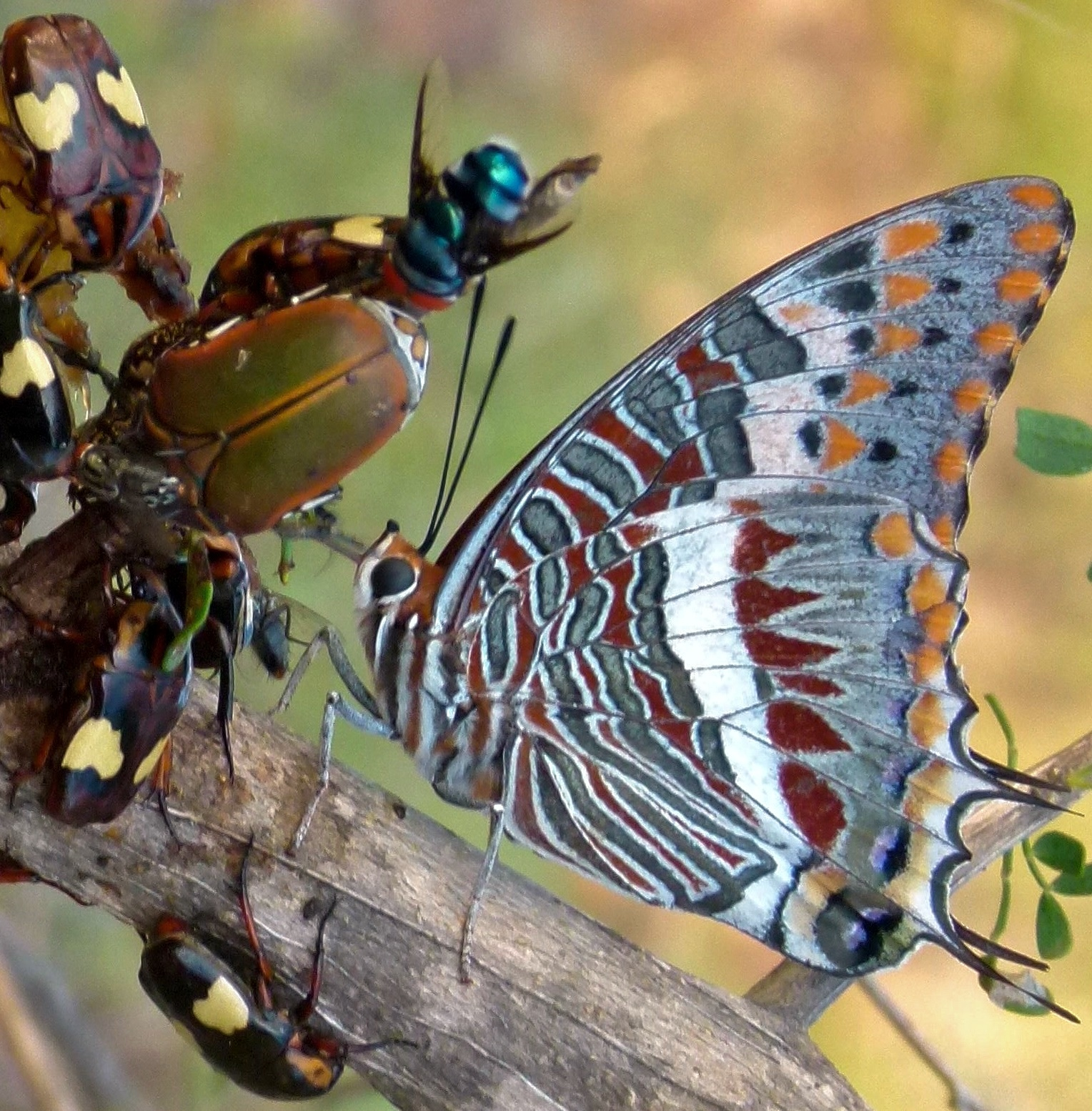
Charaxes jasius

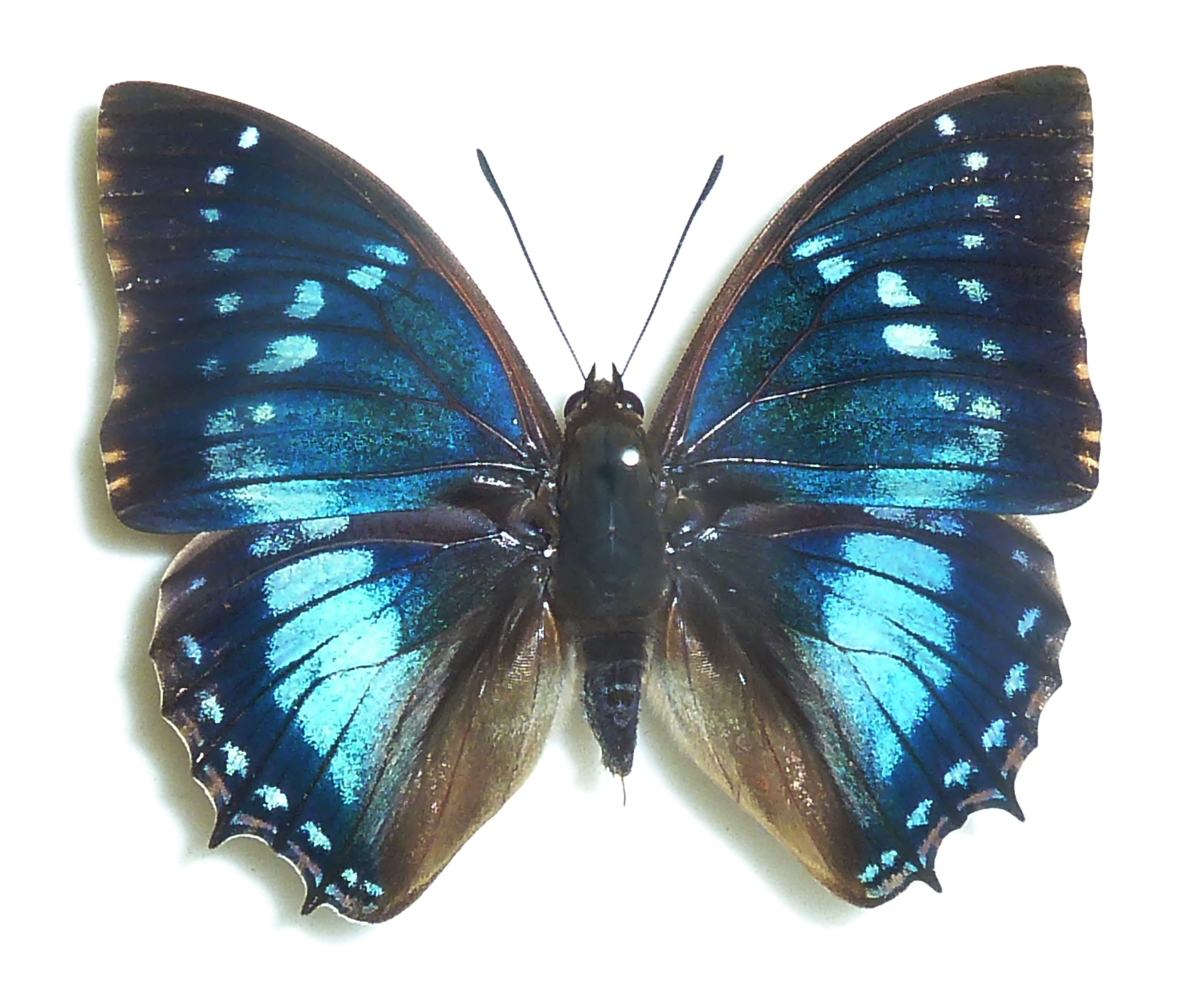
Charaxes xiphares

- Charaxes achaemenes
- Charaxes bohemani
- Charaxes brutus
- Charaxes candiope
- Charaxes castor
- Charaxes cithaeron
- Charaxes druceanus
- Charaxes etesipe
- Charaxes ethalion
- Charaxes guderiana
- Charaxes jahlusa
- Charaxes jasius
- Charaxes karkloof
- Charaxes marieps
- Charaxes pelias
- Charaxes phaeus
- Charaxes pondoensis
- Charaxes protoclea
- Charaxes vansoni
- Charaxes varanes
- Charaxes violetta
- Charaxes xiphares
- Charaxes zoolina
- Euxanthe wakefieldi

=== Subfamily Limenitidinae ===
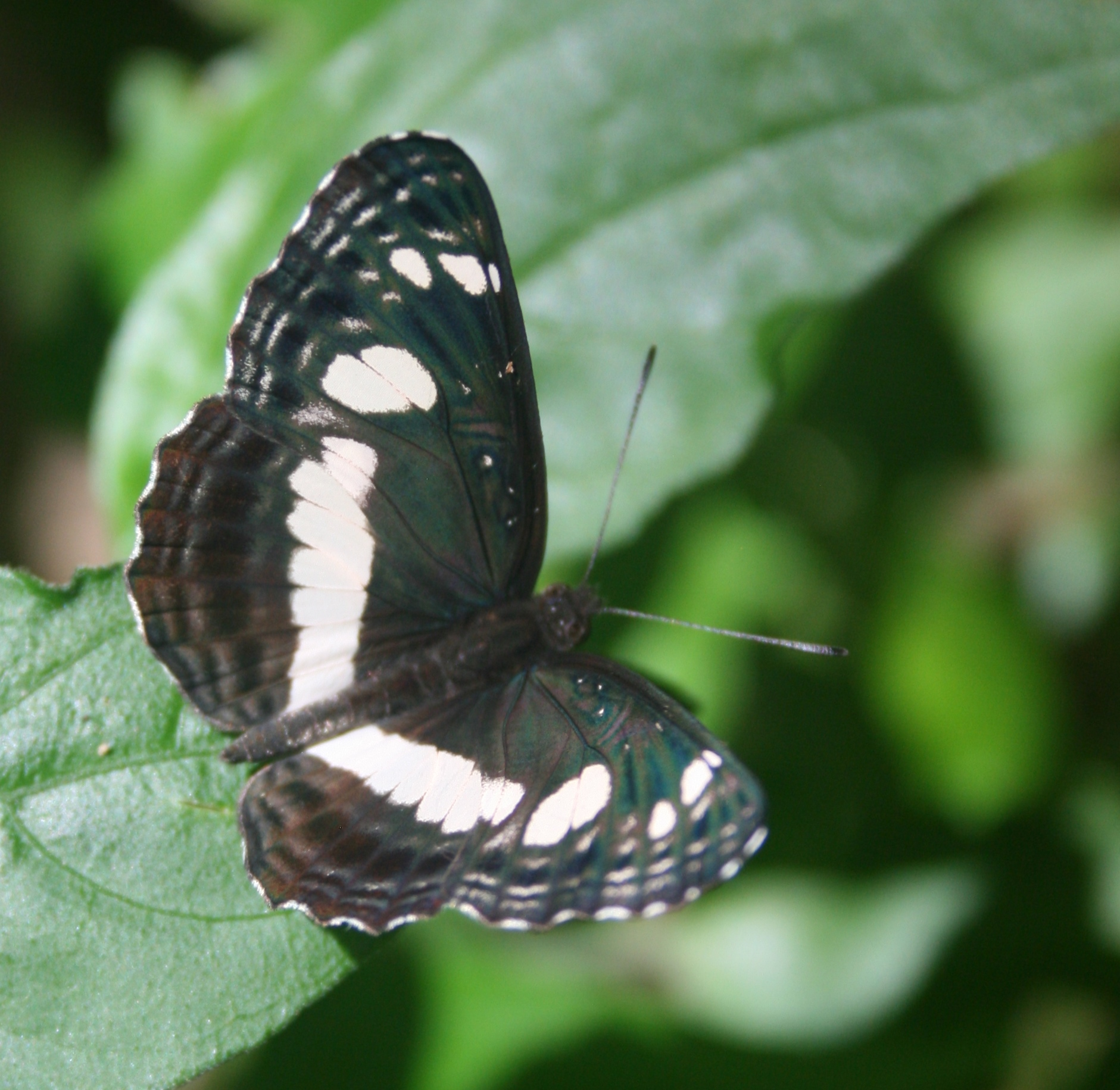
Neptis saclava

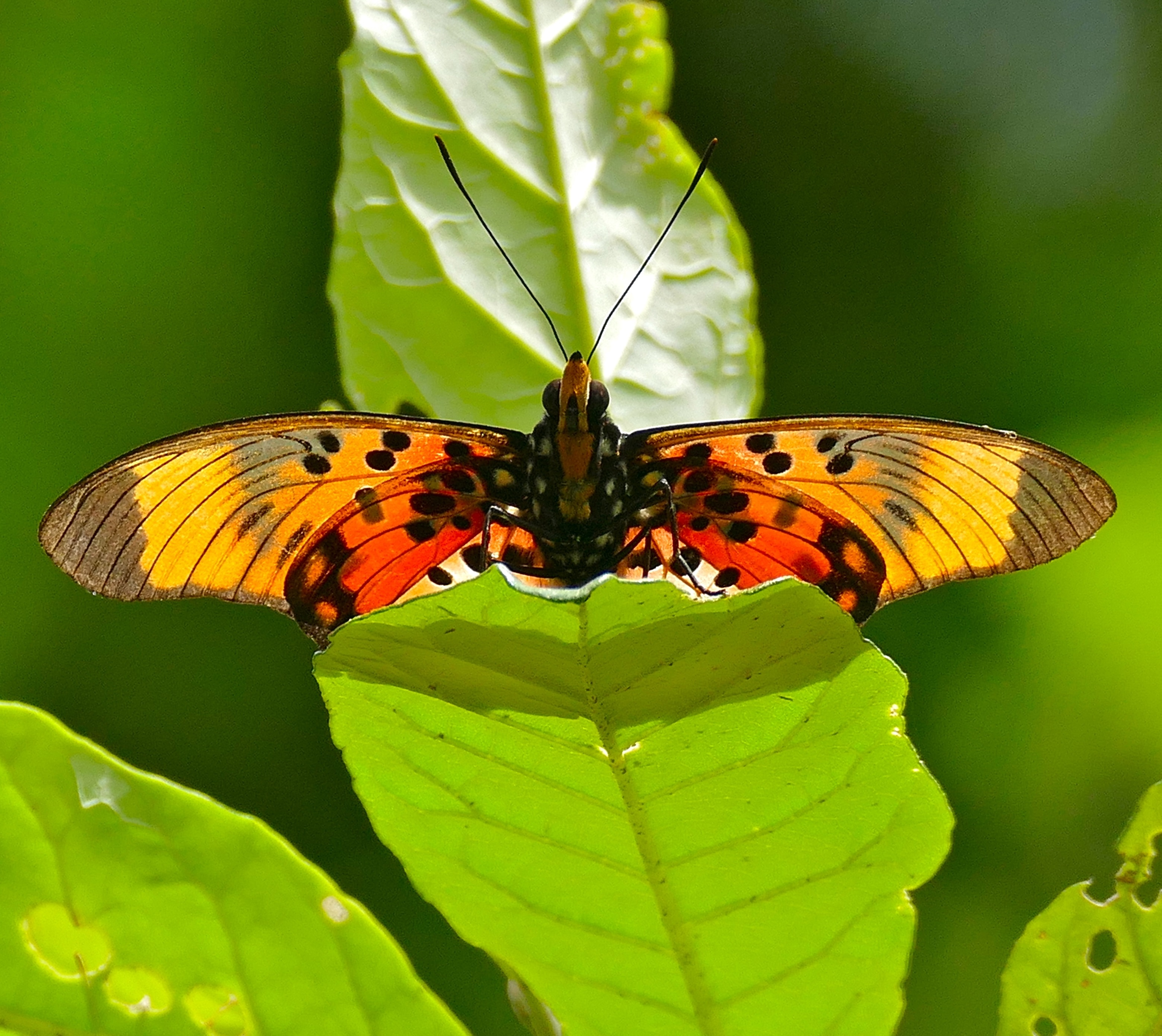
Pseudacraea boisduvalii

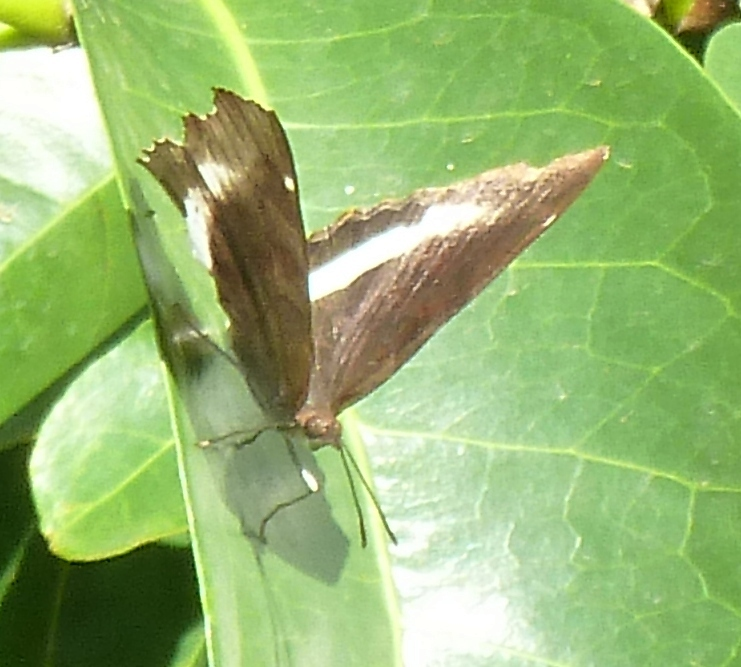
Eurytela hiarbas

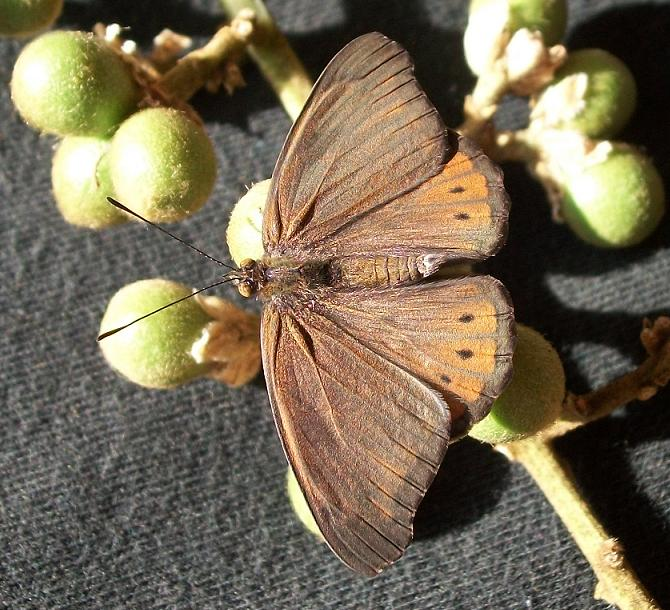
Sevenia boisduvali form monteironis

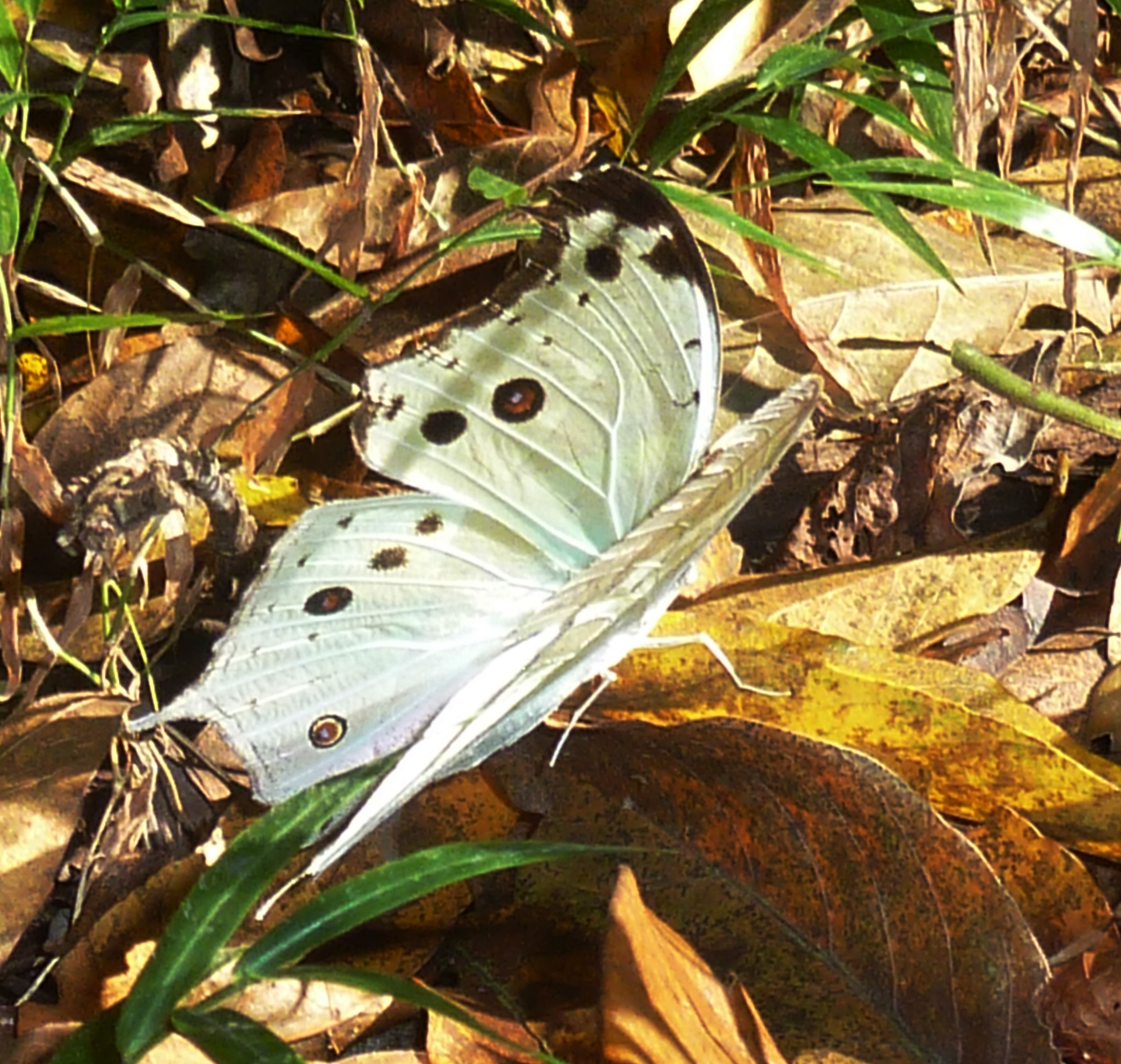
Protogoniomorpha parhassus

- Cymothoe alcimeda
- Cymothoe coranus
- Euphaedra neophron
- Euryphura achlys
- Hamanumida daedalus
- Neptis goochi
- Neptis jordani
- Neptis kiriakoffi
- Neptis laeta
- Neptis saclava
- Neptis trigonophora
- Pseudacraea boisduvali
- Pseudacraea eurytus
- Pseudacraea lucretia

=== Subfamily Cyrestinae ===
- Cyrestis camillus

=== Subfamily Biblidinae ===
- Byblia anvatara
- Byblia ilithyia
- Eurytela dryope
- Eurytela hiarbas
- Sevenia boisduvali
- Sevenia morantii
- Sevenia natalensis
- Sevenia rosa

=== Subfamily Nymphalinae ===
- Antanartia schaeneia
- Catacroptera cloanthe
- Hypolimnas anthedon
- Hypolimnas deceptor
- Hypolimnas misippus
- Junonia hierta
- Junonia natalica
- Junonia oenone
- Junonia orithya
- Junonia terea
- Junonia tugela
- Precis antilope
- Precis archesia
- Precis ceryne
- Precis octavia
- Protogoniomorpha parhassus
- Salamis anacardii
- Vanessa cardui
- Vanessa dimorphica
- Vanessa hippomene
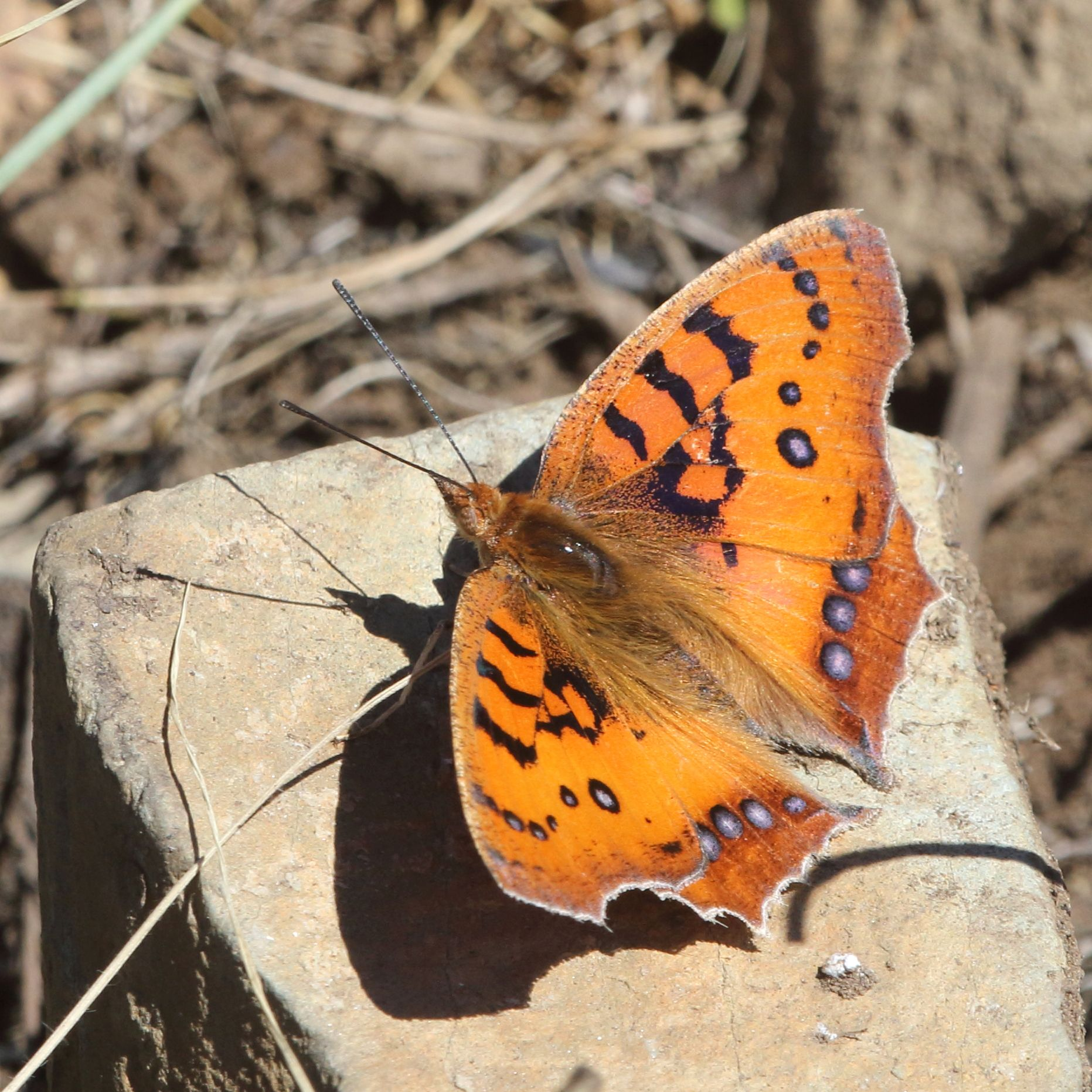
Catacroptera cloanthe

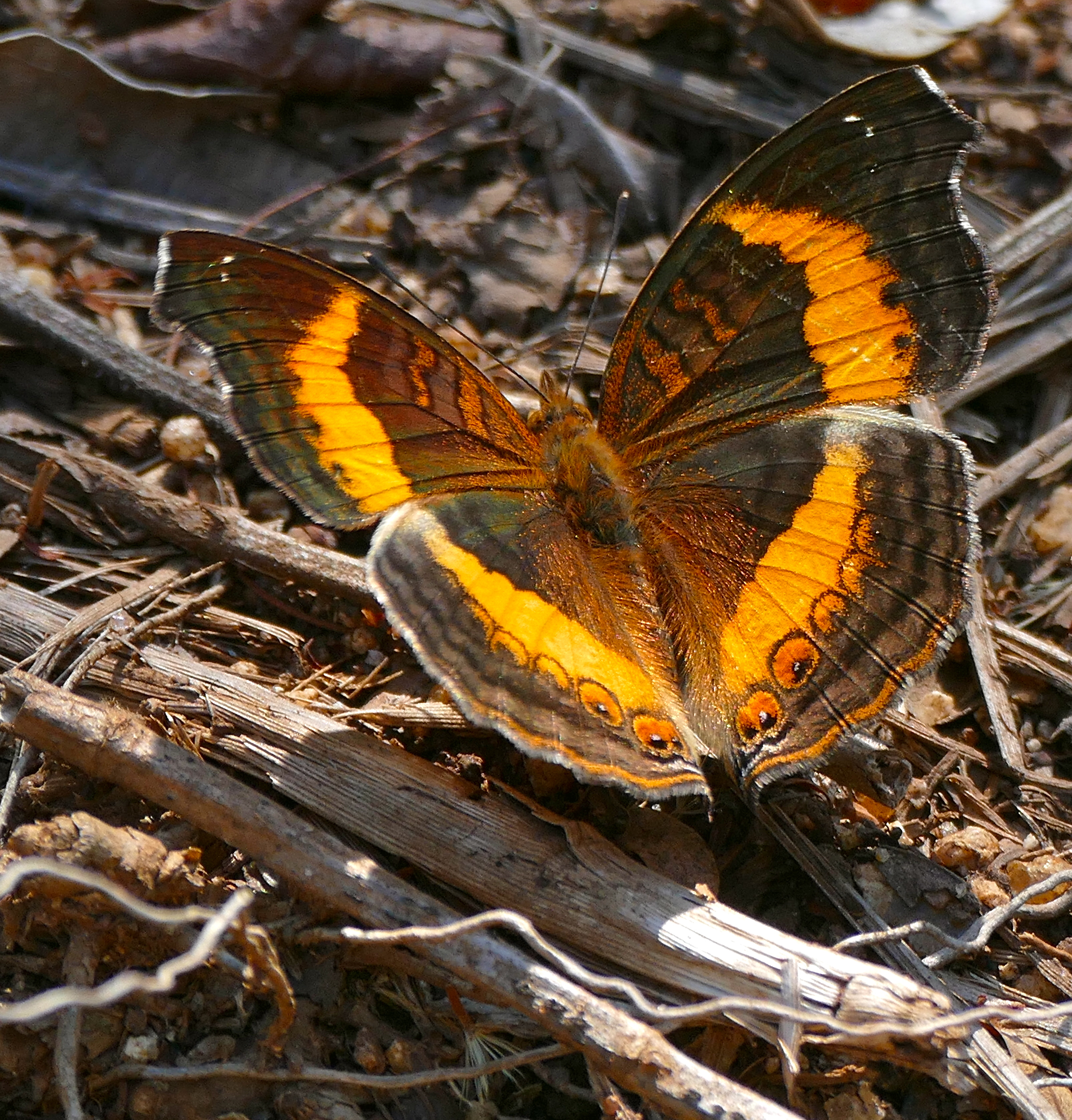
Junonia terea

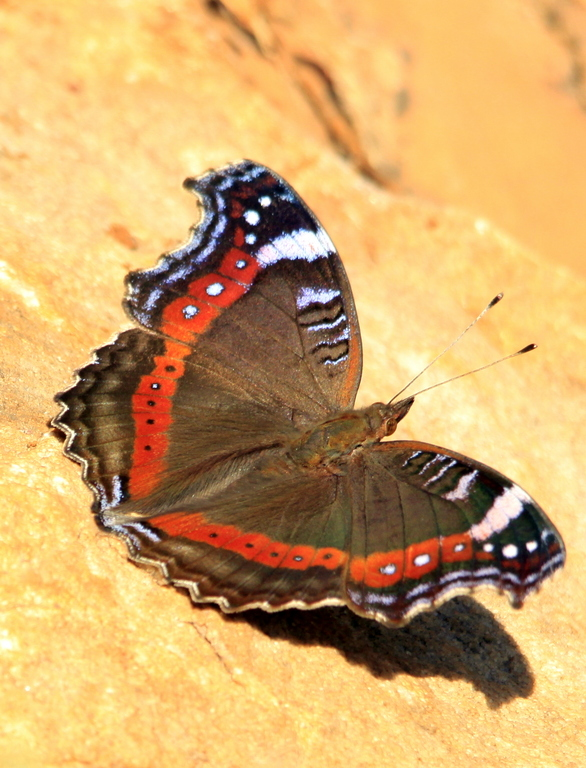
Precis archesia

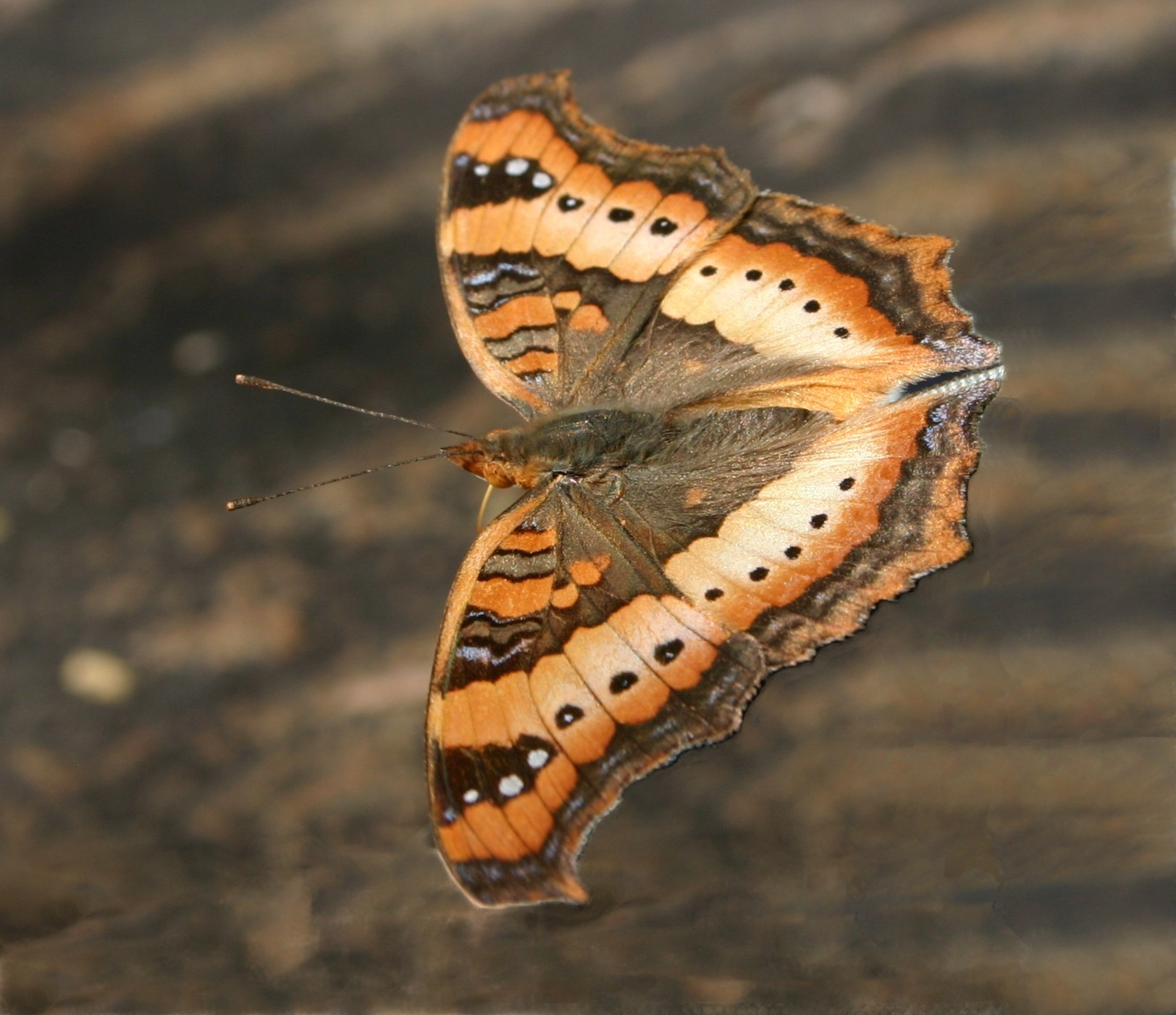
Precis ceryne, winter form

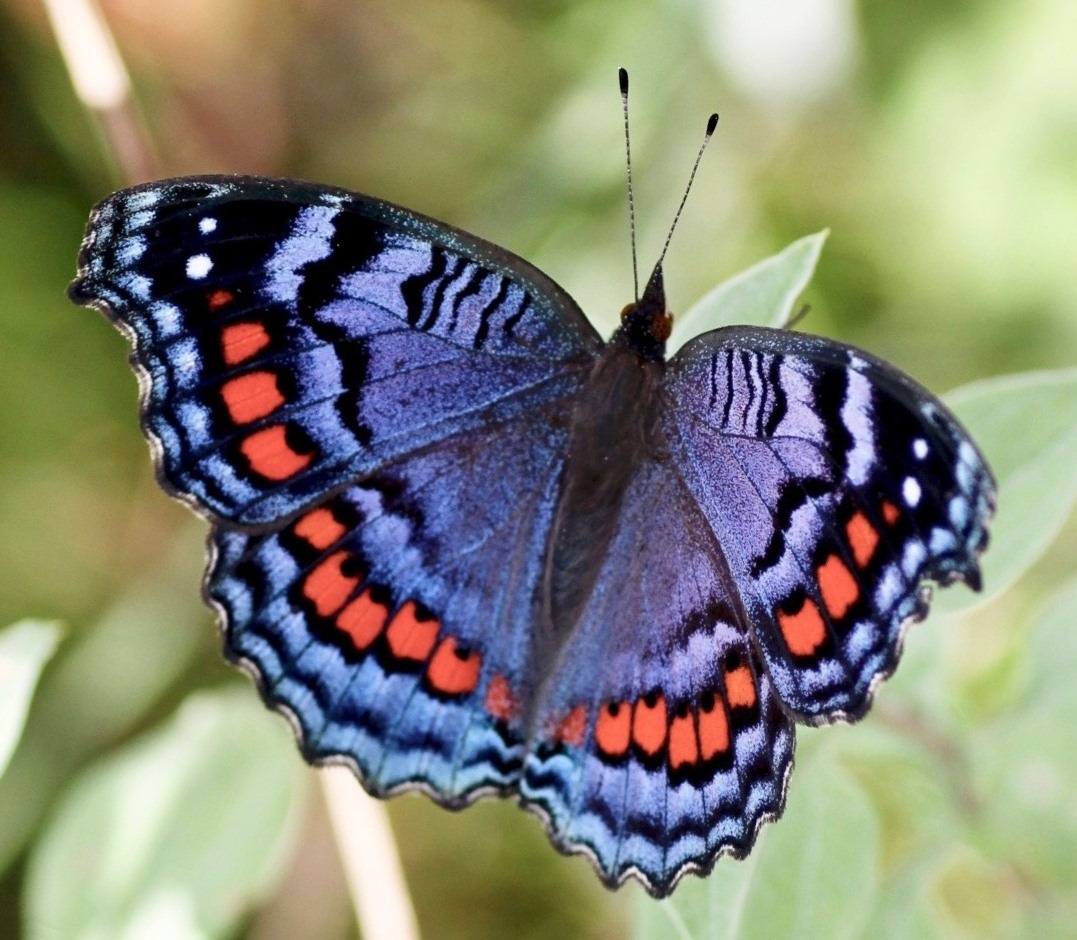
Precis octavia, winter form

=== Subfamily Libytheinae ===
- Libythea labdaca

== Family Hesperiidae ==
=== Subfamily Coeliadinae ===
- Coeliades anchises
- Coeliades forestan
- Coeliades keithloa
- Coeliades libeon
- Coeliades lorenzo
- Coeliades pisistratus

=== Subfamily Pyrginae ===
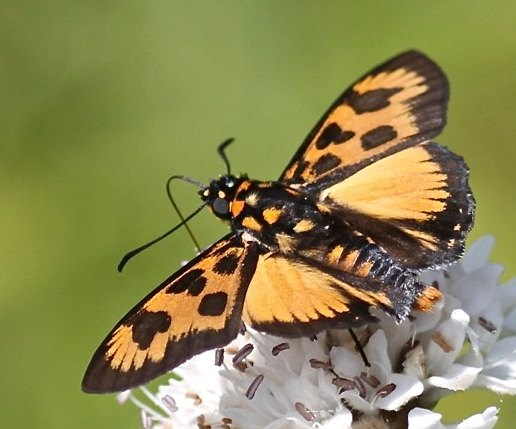
Abantis bicolor

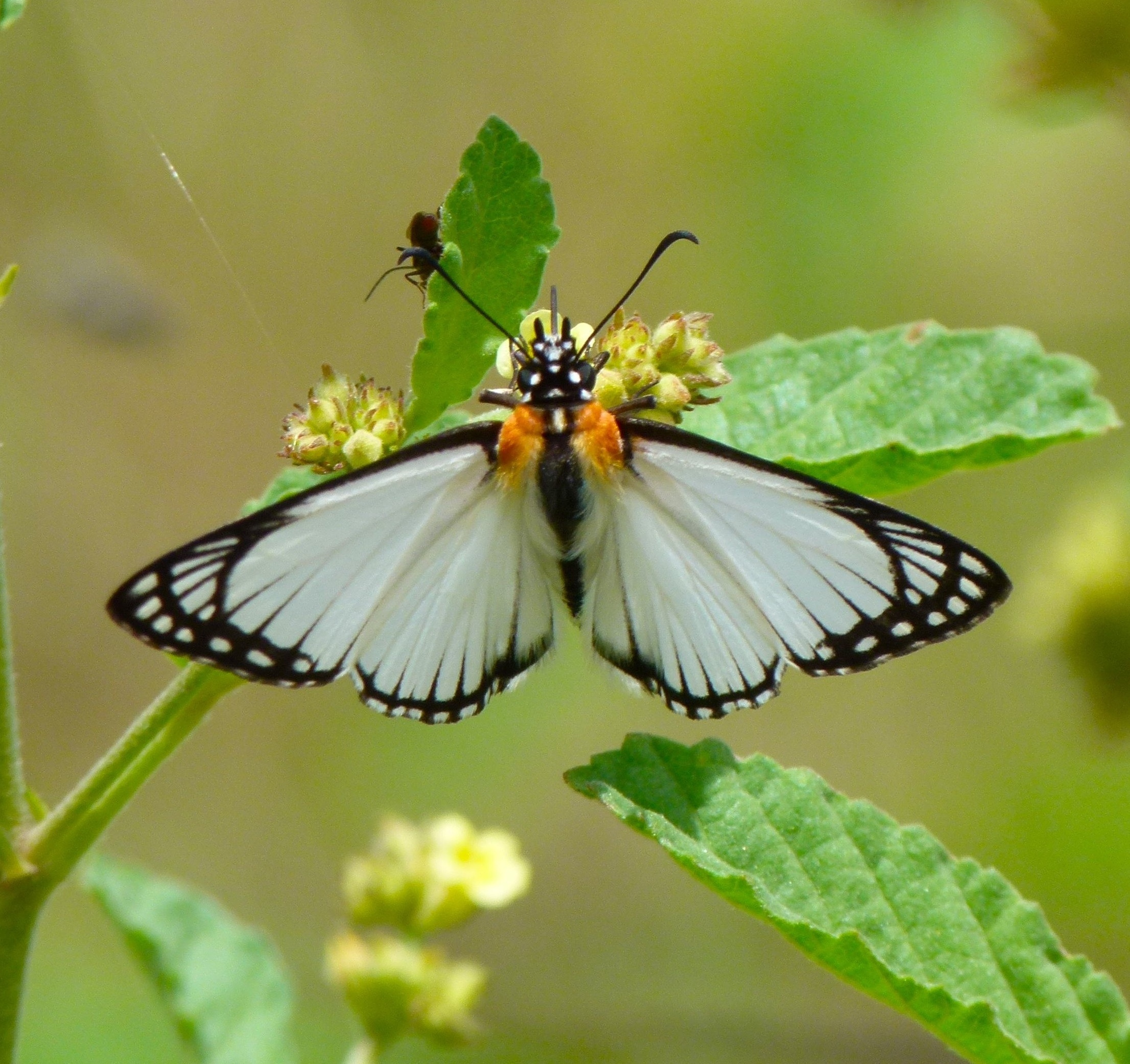
Leucochitonea levubu

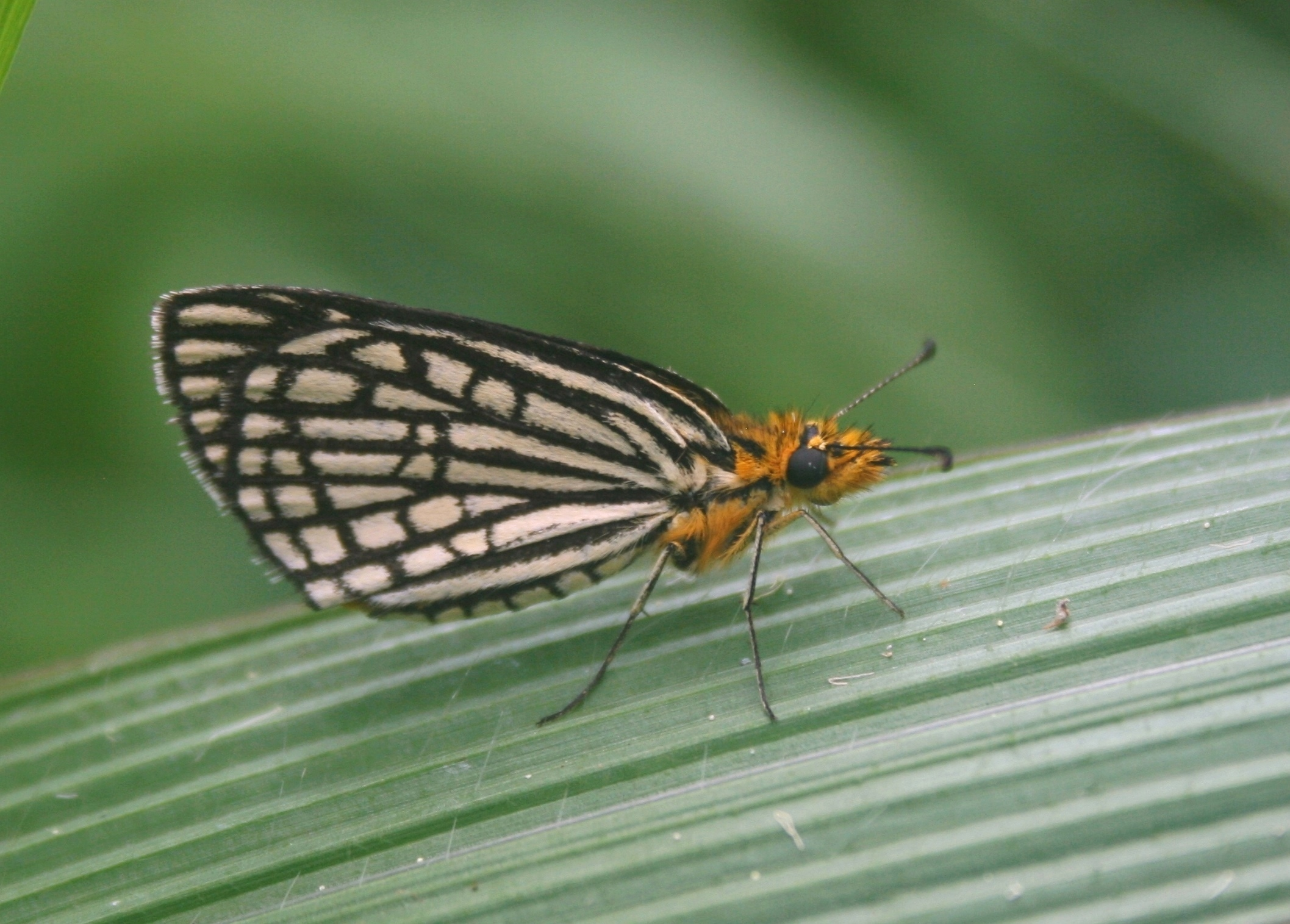
Metisella willemi

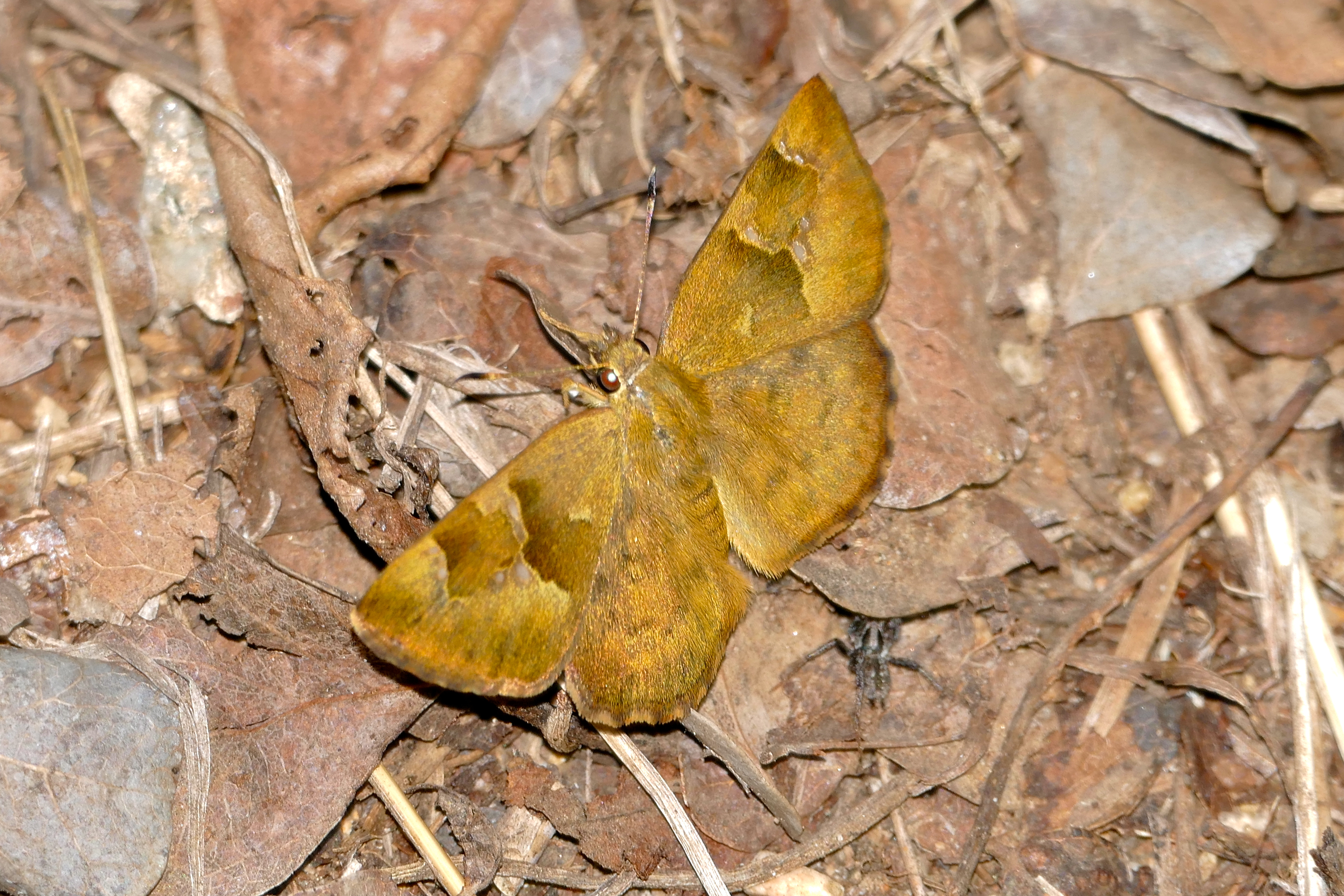
Sarangesa phidyle

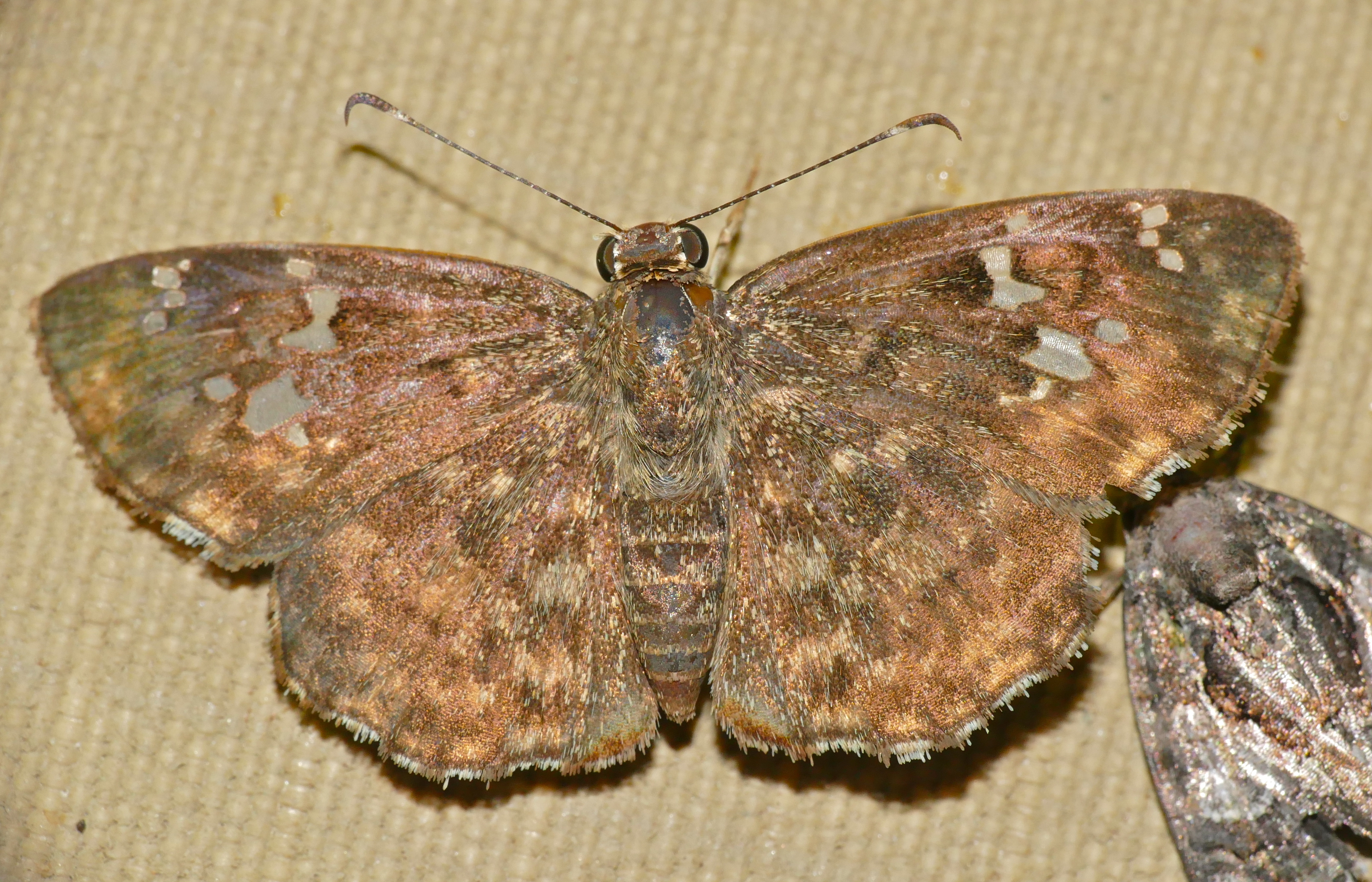
Sarangesa seineri

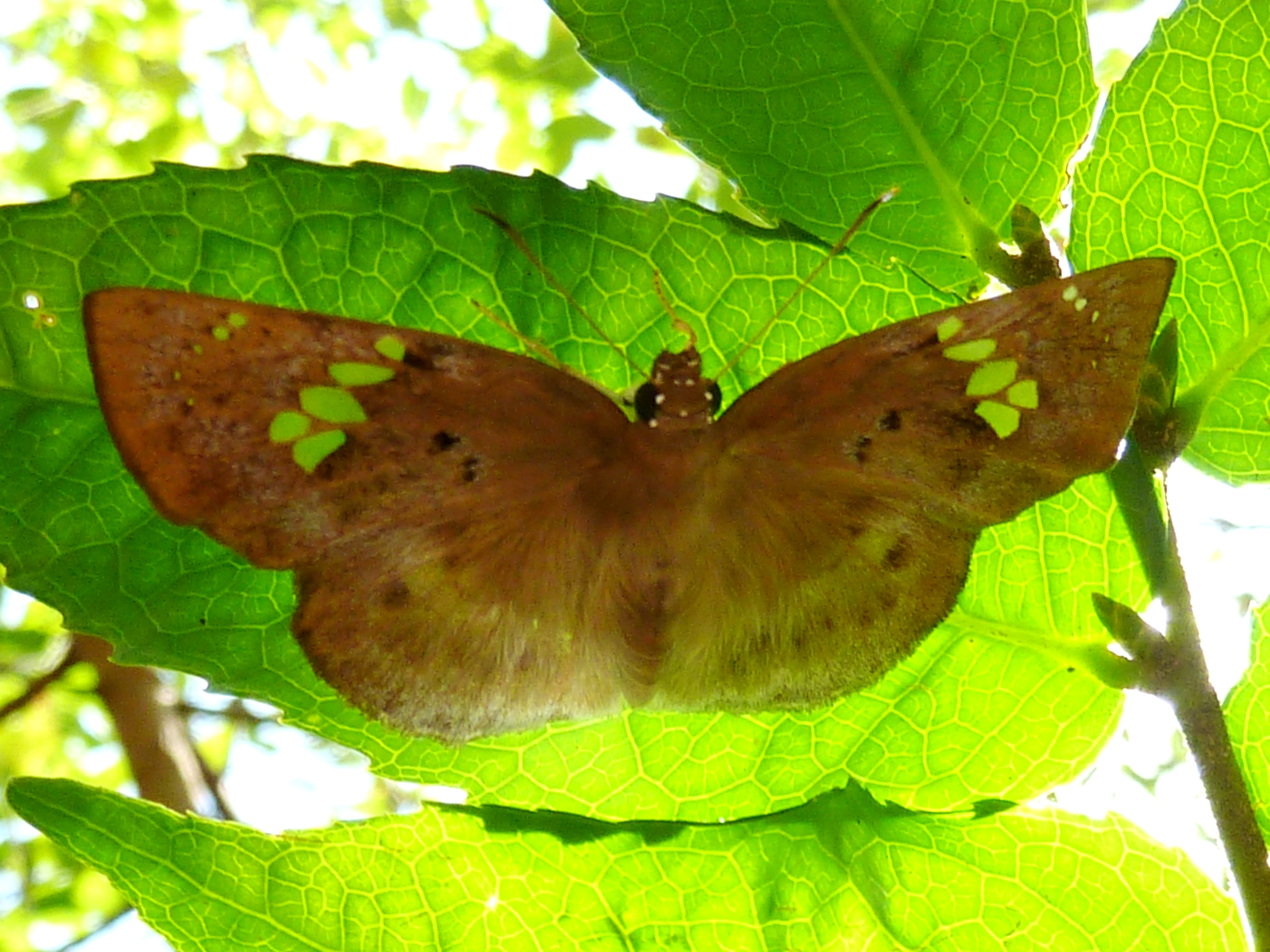
Tagiades flesus

- Abantis bicolor
- Abantis paradisea
- Abantis tettensis
- Abantis venosa
- Alenia namaqua
- Alenia sandaster
- Astictopterus inornatus
- Calleagris kobela
- Calleagris krooni
- Caprona pillaana
- Celaenorrhinus mokeezi
- Eagris nottoana
- Eretis djaelaelae
- Eretis umbra
- Gomalia elma
- Leucochitonea levubu
- Metisella aegipan
- Metisella malgacha
- Metisella meninx
- Metisella metis
- Metisella syrinx
- Metisella willemi
- Netrobalane canopus
- Sarangesa motozi
- Sarangesa phidyle
- Sarangesa ruona
- Sarangesa seineri
- Spialia agylla
- Spialia asterodia
- Spialia colotes
- Spialia confusa
- Spialia delagoae
- Spialia depauperata
- Spialia diomus
- Spialia dromus
- Spialia mafa
- Spialia nanus
- Spialia paula
- Spialia sataspes
- Spialia secessus
- Spialia spio
- Tagiades flesus
- Tsitana dicksoni
- Tsitana tsita
- Tsitana tulbagha
- Tsitana uitenhaga

=== Subfamily Hesperiinae ===
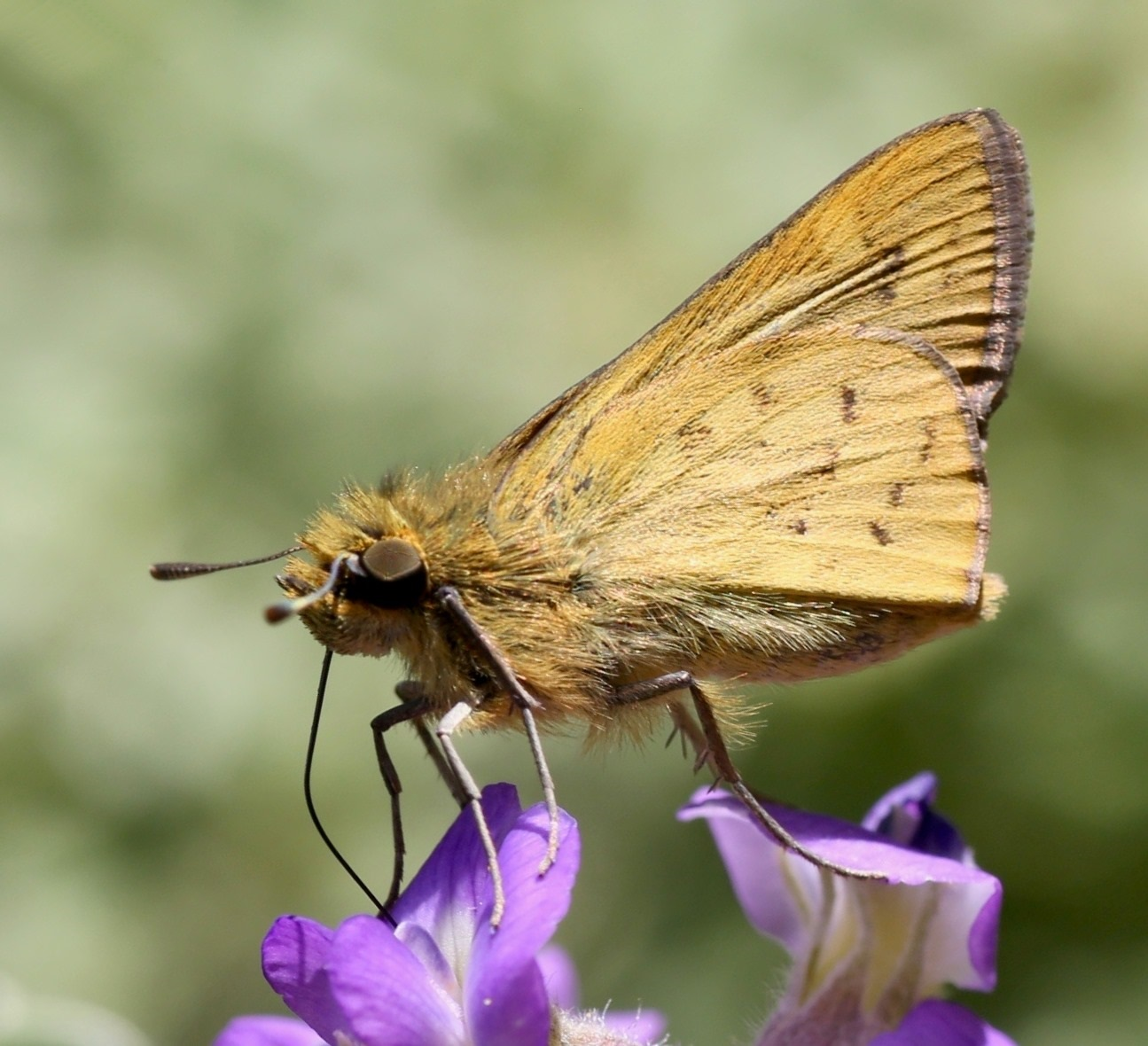
Afrogegenes letterstedti

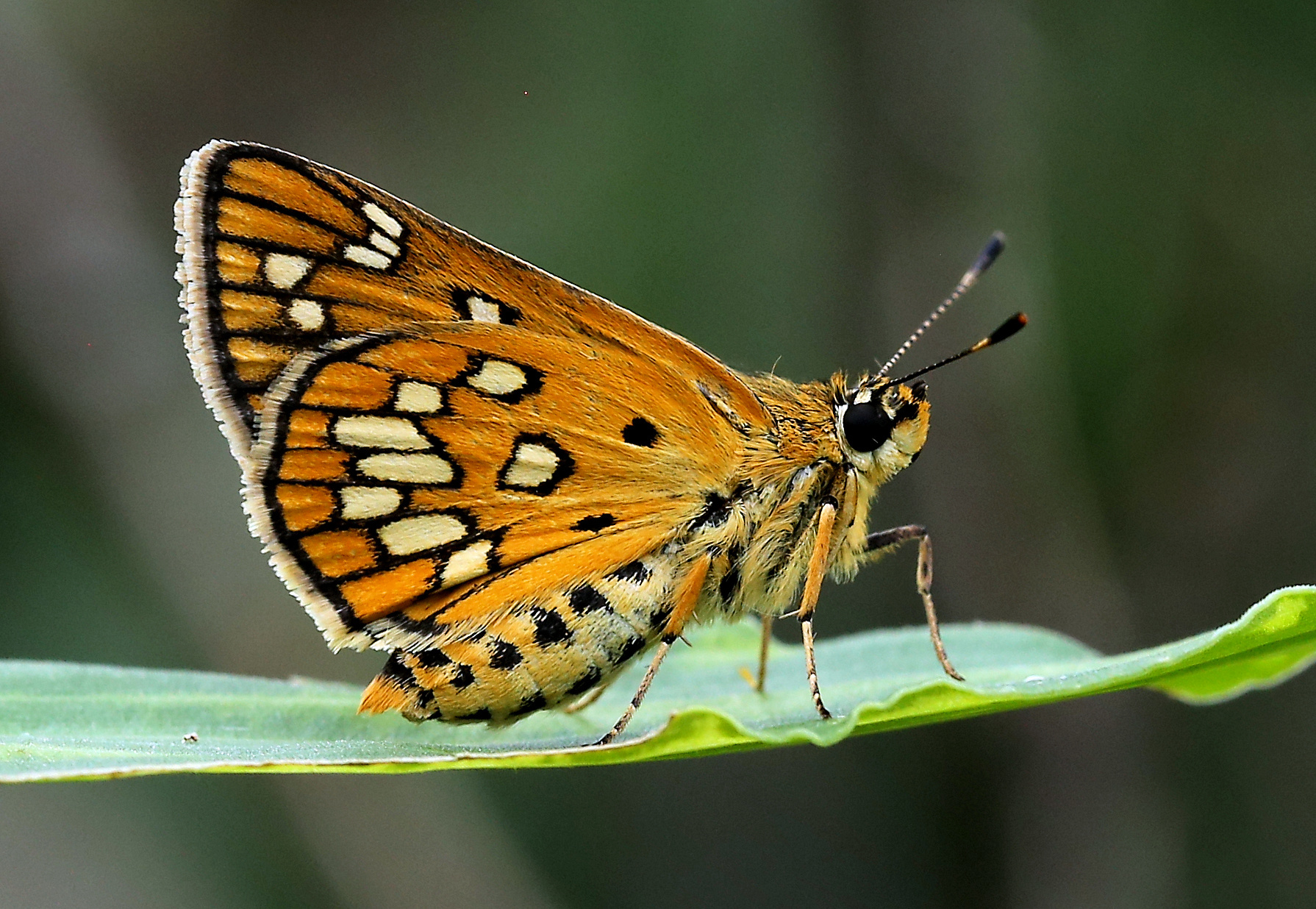
Kedestes callicles

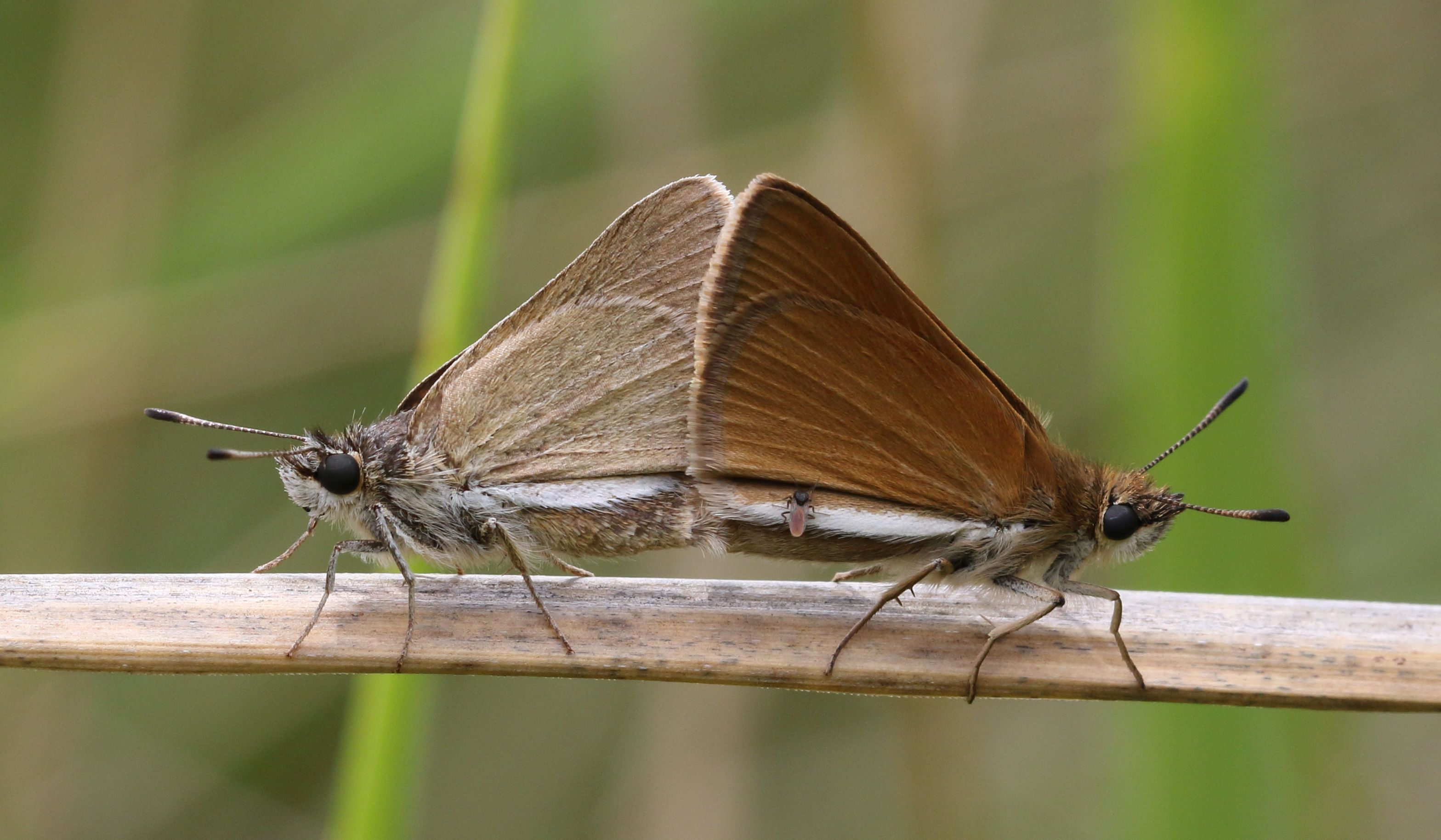
Kedestes lenis

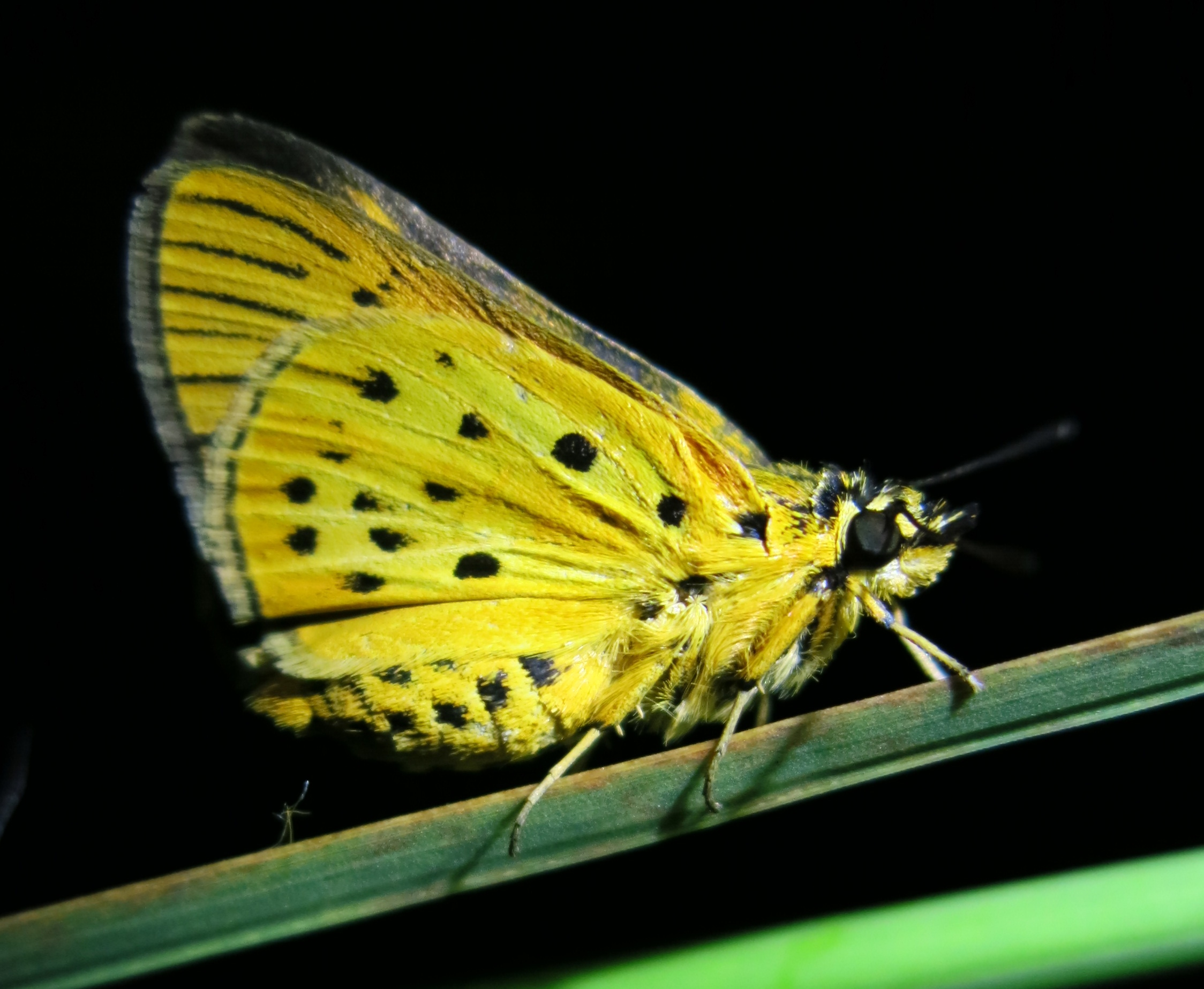
Kedestes macomo

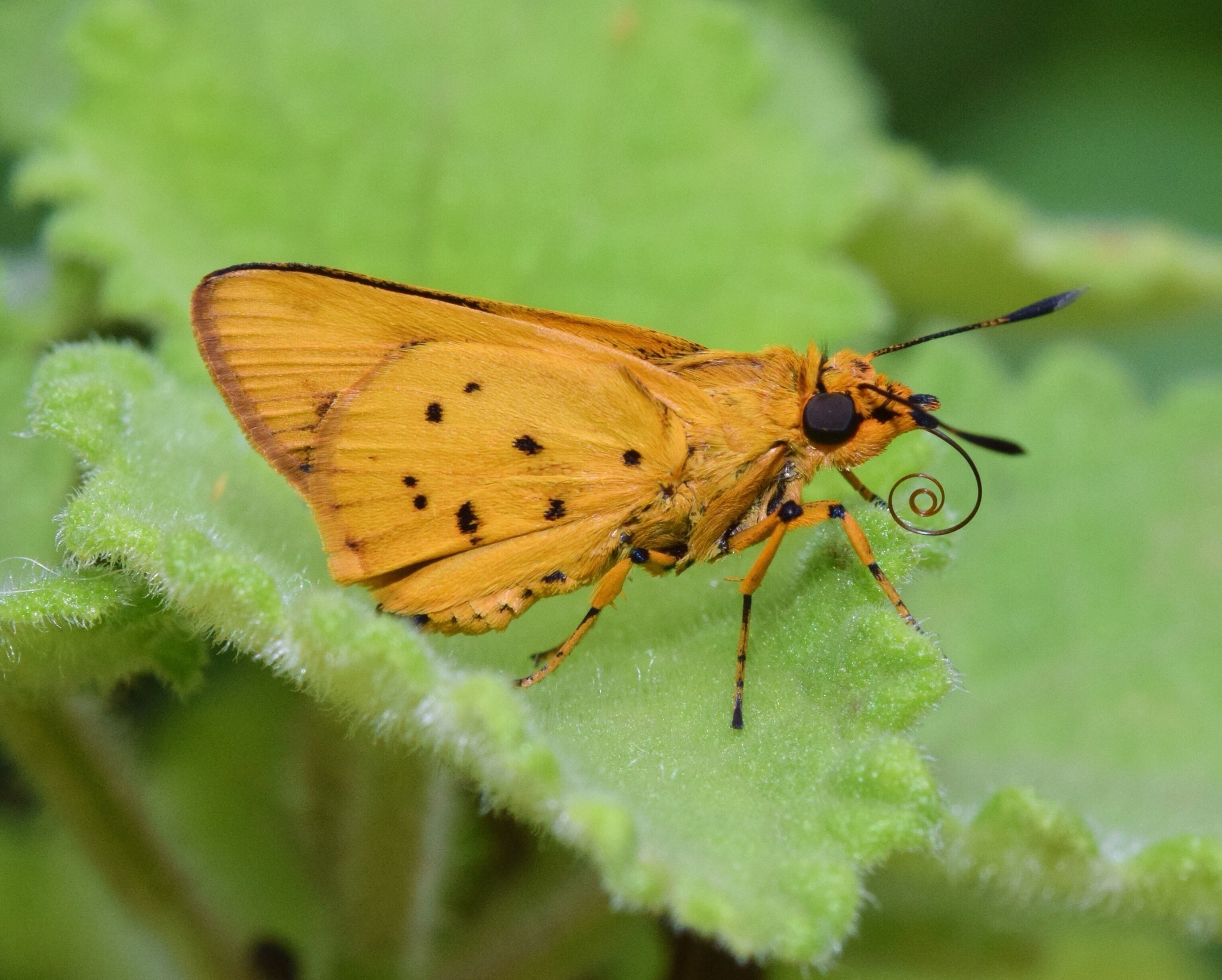
Parosmodes morantii

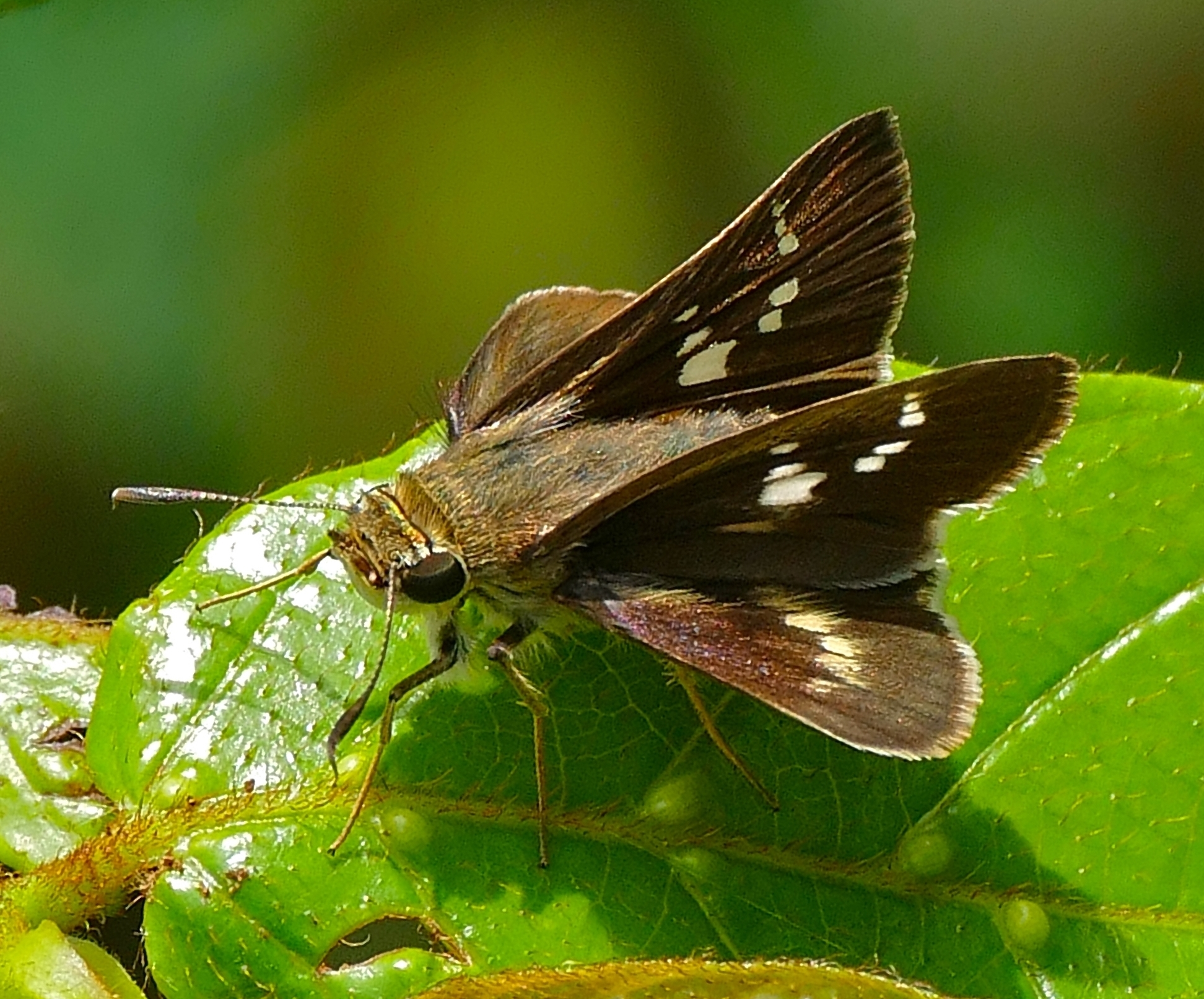
Platylesches neba

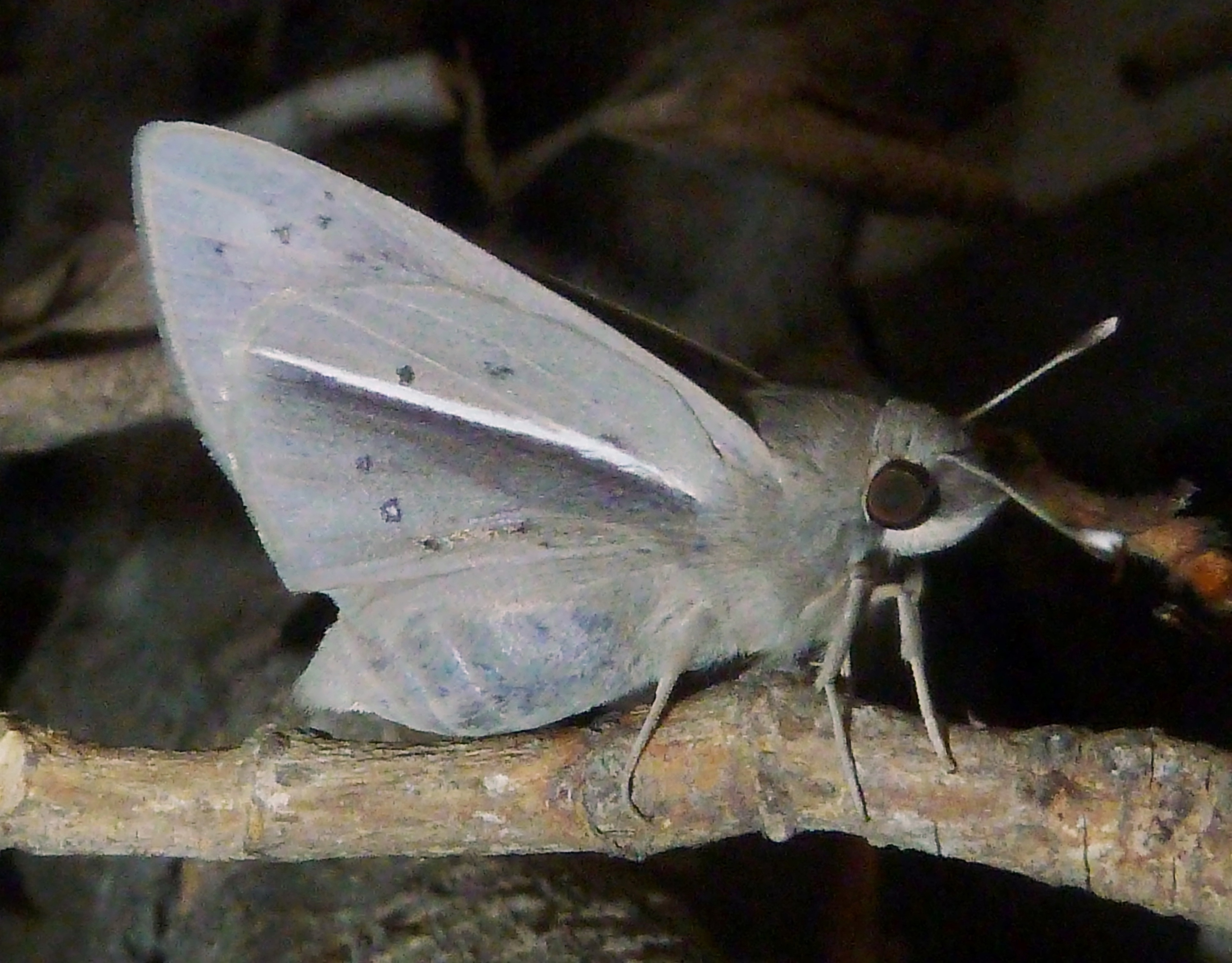
Zophopetes dysmephila

- Acada biseriata
- Acleros mackenii
- Andronymus caesar
- Andronymus neander
- Artitropa erinnys
- Borbo borbonica
- Borbo detecta
- Borbo fallax
- Borbo fatuellus
- Borbo ferruginea
- Borbo gemella
- Borbo holtzii
- Borbo lugens
- Borbo micans
- Fresna nyassae
- Gegenes hottentota
- Gegenes niso
- Gegenes pumilio
- Kedestes barberae
- Kedestes callicles
- Kedestes chaca
- Kedestes lenis
- Kedestes lepenula
- Kedestes macomo
- Kedestes mohozutza
- Kedestes nerva
- Kedestes niveostriga
- Kedestes sarahae
- Kedestes wallengrenii
- Moltena fiara
- Parnara monasi
- Parosmodes morantii
- Pelopidas mathias
- Pelopidas thrax
- Platylesches ayresii
- Platylesches dolomitica
- Platylesches galesa
- Platylesches moritili
- Platylesches neba
- Platylesches picanini
- Platylesches robustus
- Platylesches tina
- Zenonia zeno
- Zophopetes dysmephila

== Family Lycaenidae ==
=== Subfamily Poritiinae ===
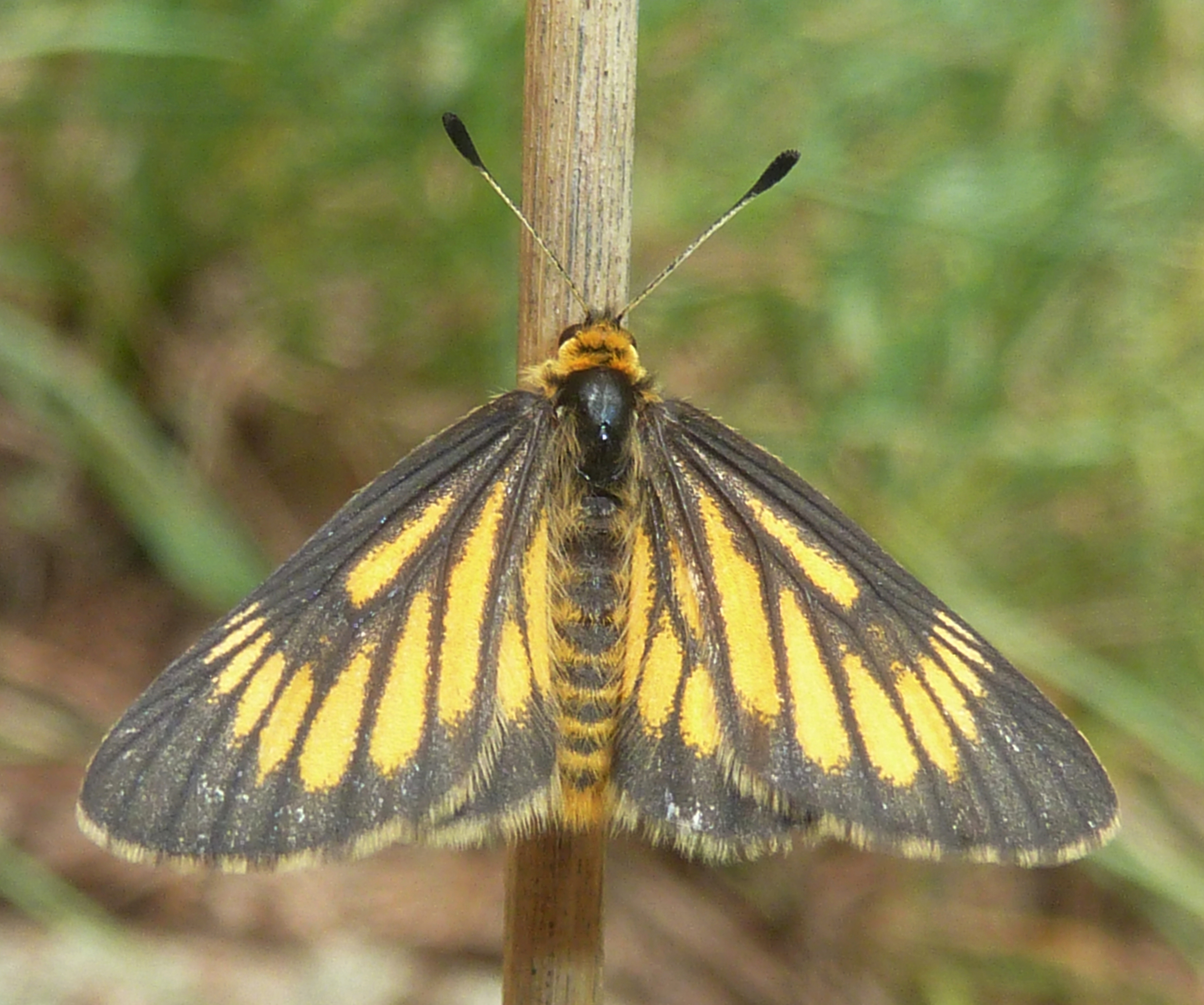
Alaena amazoula

- Alaena amazoula
- Alaena margaritacea
- Baliochila aslanga
- Baliochila lipara
- Cnodontes penningtoni
- Deloneura immaculata
- Deloneura millari
- Durbania amakosa
- Durbania limbata
- Durbaniella clarki
- Durbaniopsis saga
- Ornipholidotos peucetia
- Pentila tropicalis
- Teriomima zuluana

=== Subfamily Miletinae ===
- Aslauga australis
- Lachnocnema bibulus
- Lachnocnema durbani
- Lachnocnema laches
- Lachnocnema regularis

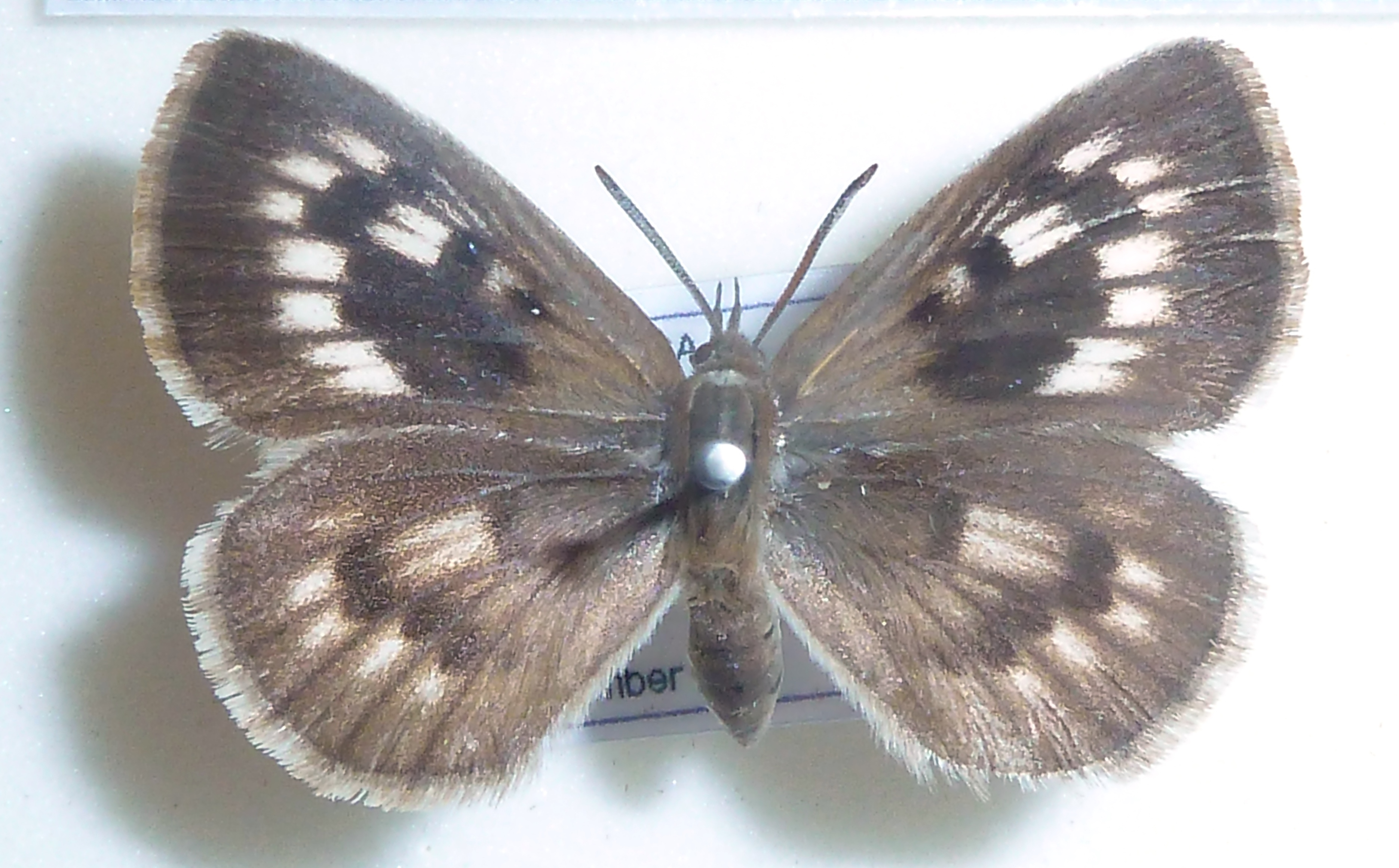
Thestor basutus basutus

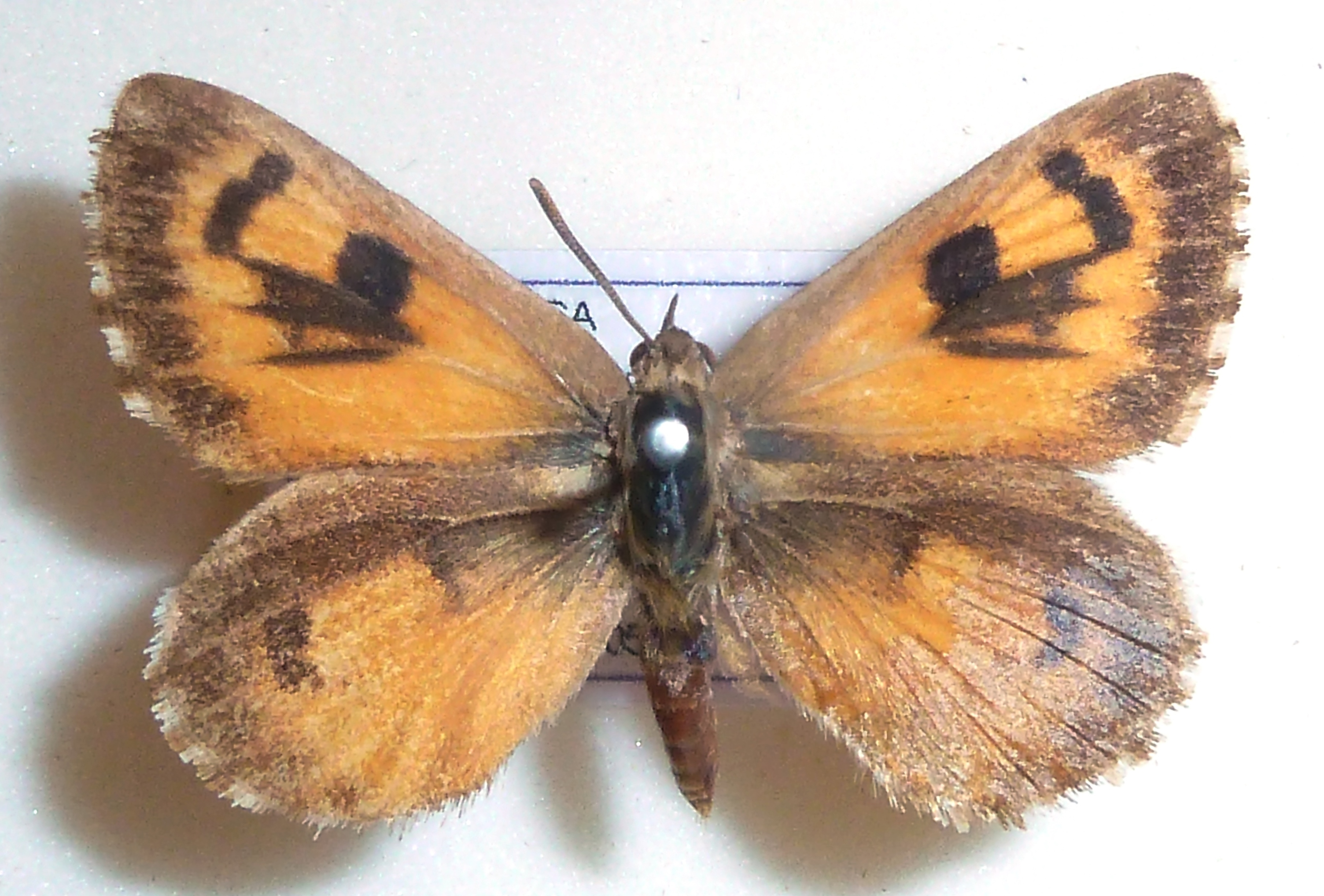
Thestor protumnus aridus

- Thestor barbatus
- Thestor basutus
- Thestor brachycerus
- Thestor braunsi
- Thestor calviniae
- Thestor camdeboo
- Thestor claassensi
- Thestor compassbergae
- Thestor dicksoni
- Thestor dryburghi
- Thestor holmesi
- Thestor kaplani
- Thestor montanus
- Thestor murrayi
- Thestor overbergensis
- Thestor penningtoni
- Thestor petra
- Thestor pictus
- Thestor pringlei
- Thestor protumnus
- Thestor rileyi
- Thestor rooibergensis
- Thestor rossouwi
- Thestor stepheni
- Thestor strutti
- Thestor vansoni
- Thestor yildizae

=== Subfamily Aphnaeinae ===
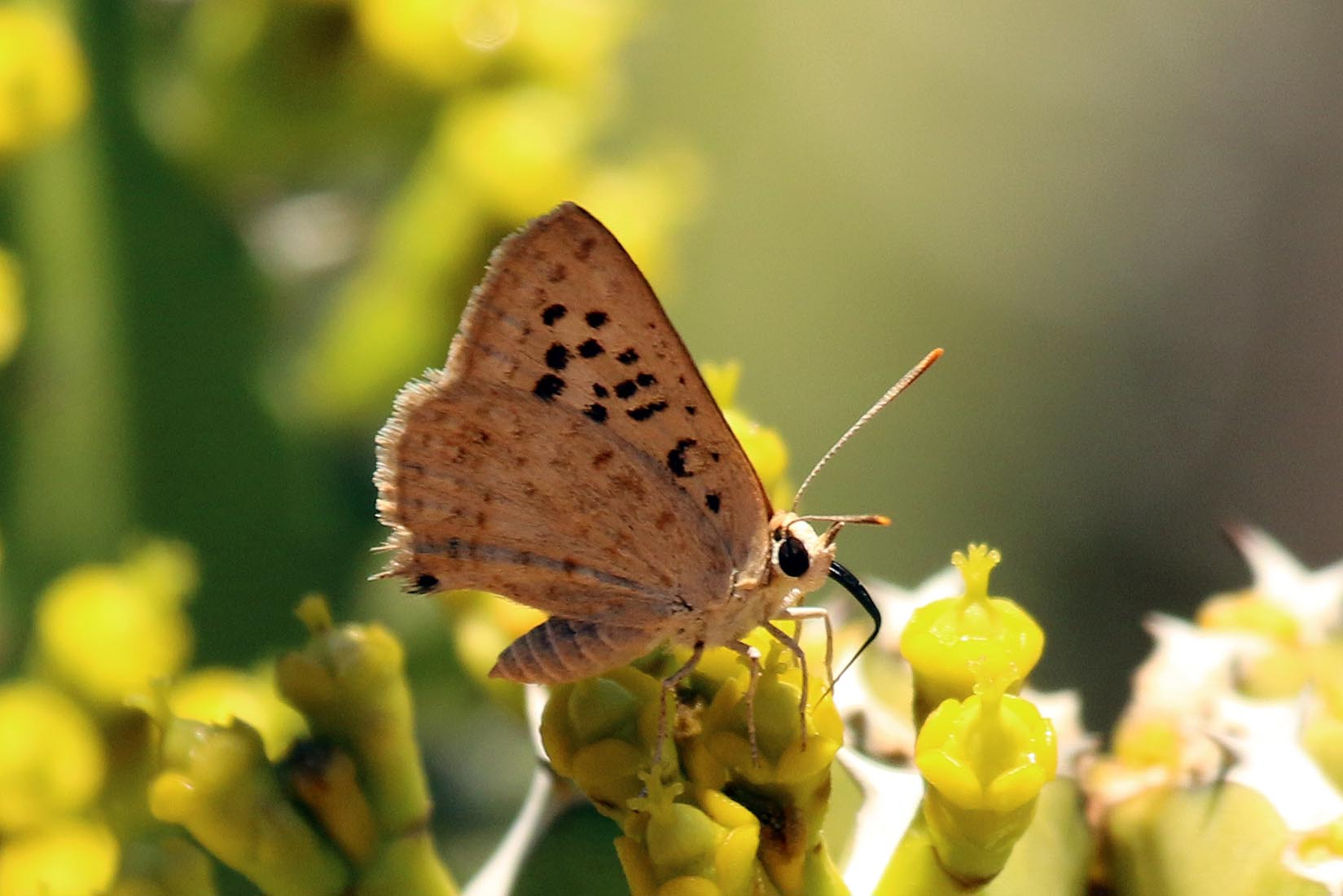
Male Crudaria leroma

- Aloeides almeida
- Aloeides apicalis
- Aloeides aranda
- Aloeides arida
- Aloeides bamptoni
- Aloeides barbarae
- Aloeides barklyi
- Aloeides braueri
- Aloeides caffrariae
- Aloeides caledoni
- Aloeides carolynnae
- Aloeides clarki
- Aloeides damarensis
- Aloeides dentatis
- Aloeides depicta
- Aloeides dicksoni
- Aloeides dryas
- Aloeides egerides
- Aloeides gowani
- Aloeides henningi
- Aloeides juana
- Aloeides kaplani
- Aloeides lutescens
- Aloeides macmasteri
- Aloeides maluti
- Aloeides margaretae
- Aloeides mbuluensis
- Aloeides merces
- Aloeides molomo
- Aloeides monticola
- Aloeides nollothi
- Aloeides nubilus
- Aloeides oreas
- Aloeides pallida
- Aloeides penningtoni
- Aloeides pierus
- Aloeides pringlei
- Aloeides quickelbergei
- Aloeides rileyi
- Aloeides rossouwi
- Aloeides simplex
- Aloeides stevensoni
- Aloeides susanae
- Aloeides swanepoeli
- Aloeides taikosama
- Aloeides thyra
- Aloeides titei
- Aloeides trimeni
- Aloeides vansoni
- Aphnaeus hutchinsonii
- Argyraspodes argyraspis
- Axiocerses amanga
- Axiocerses coalescens
- Axiocerses croesus

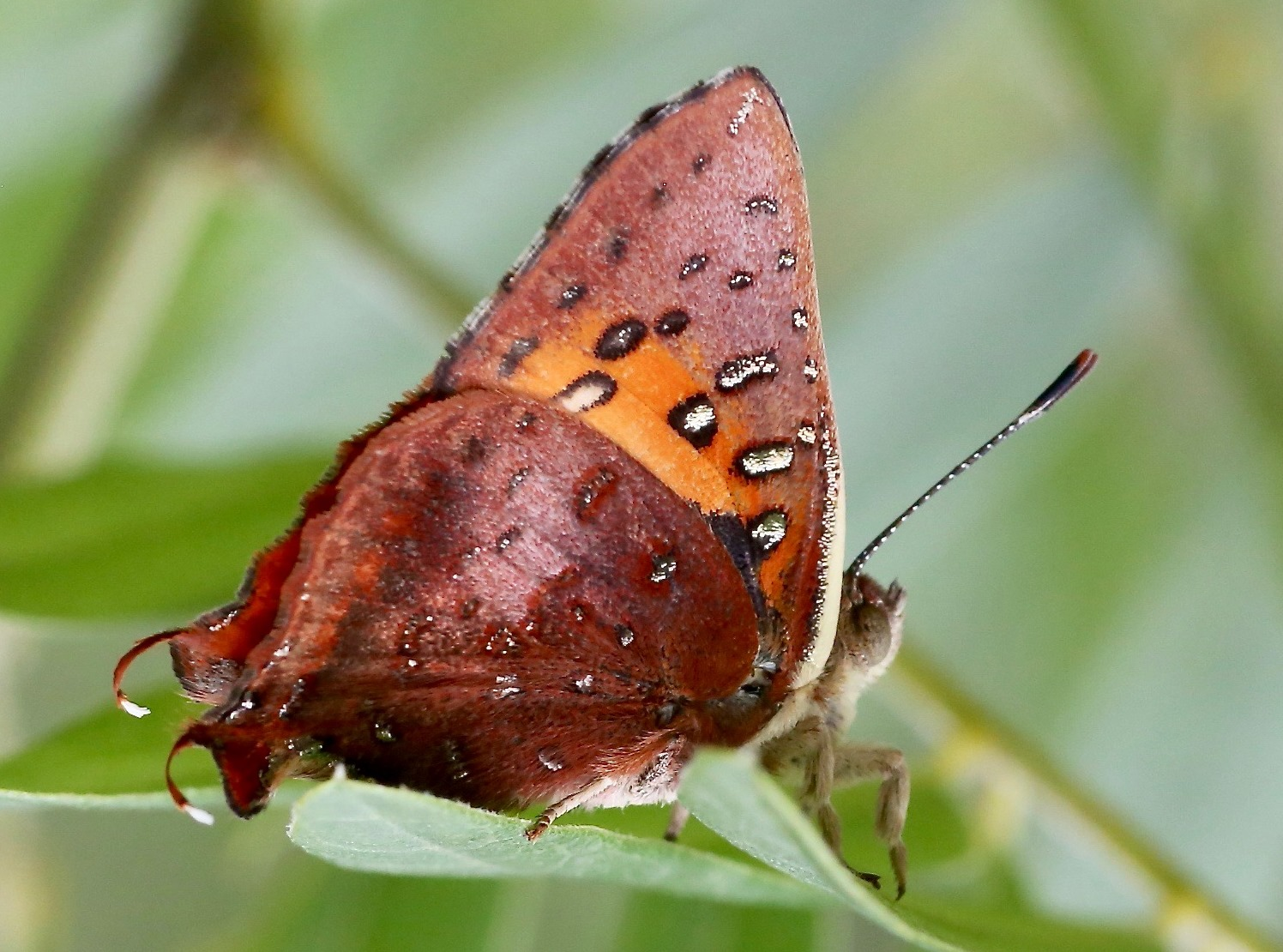
Male Axiocerses tjoane

- Axiocerses tjoane
- Chloroselas mazoensis
- Chloroselas pseudozeritis
- Chrysoritis adonis
- Chrysoritis aethon
- Chrysoritis aridus
- Chrysoritis aureus
- Chrysoritis azurius
- Chrysoritis beaufortius
- Chrysoritis beulah
- Chrysoritis blencathrae
- Chrysoritis braueri
- Chrysoritis brooksi
- Chrysoritis chrysantas
- Chrysoritis chrysaor
- Chrysoritis daphne
- Chrysoritis dicksoni
- Chrysoritis endymion
- Chrysoritis felthami
- Chrysoritis irene
- Chrysoritis lycegenes
- Chrysoritis lyncurium
- Chrysoritis midas
- Chrysoritis natalensis
- Chrysoritis nigricans
- Chrysoritis oreas
- Chrysoritis orientalis
- Chrysoritis palmus
- Chrysoritis pan
- Chrysoritis pelion
- Chrysoritis penningtoni
- Chrysoritis perseus
- Chrysoritis phosphor
- Chrysoritis plutus
- Chrysoritis pyramus
- Chrysoritis pyroeis
- Chrysoritis rileyi
- Chrysoritis swanepoeli
- Chrysoritis thysbe
- Chrysoritis trimeni
- Chrysoritis turneri
- Chrysoritis uranus
- Chrysoritis violescens
- Chrysoritis zeuxo
- Chrysoritis zonarius
- Cigaritis ella
- Cigaritis mozambica
- Cigaritis namaquus
- Cigaritis natalensis
- Cigaritis phanes
- Crudaria capensis
- Crudaria leroma
- Crudaria wykehami
- (Erikssonia acraeina)
- Erikssonia edgei

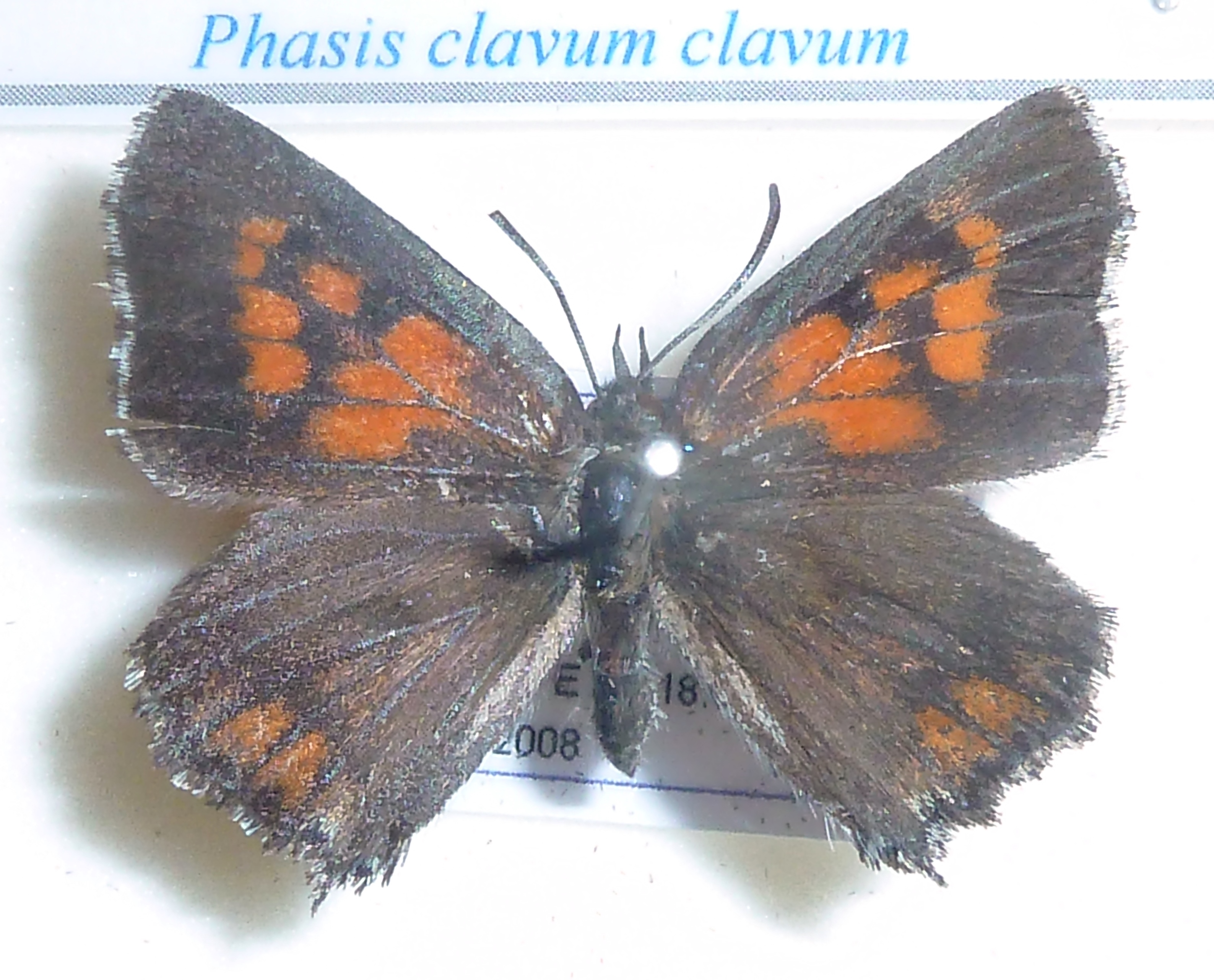
Phasis clavum clavum

- Phasis braueri
- Phasis clavum
- Phasis pringlei
- Phasis thero
- Trimenia argyroplaga
- Trimenia macmasteri
- Trimenia malagrida
- Trimenia wallengrenii
- Trimenia wykehami
- Tylopaedia sardonyx

=== Subfamily Theclinae ===
- Capys alphaeus
- Capys disjunctus
- Capys penningtoni
- Deudorix antalus
- Deudorix dariaves
- Deudorix dinochares
- Deudorix dinomenes
- Deudorix diocles
- Deudorix penningtoni
- Deudorix vansoni
- Hypolycaena buxtoni

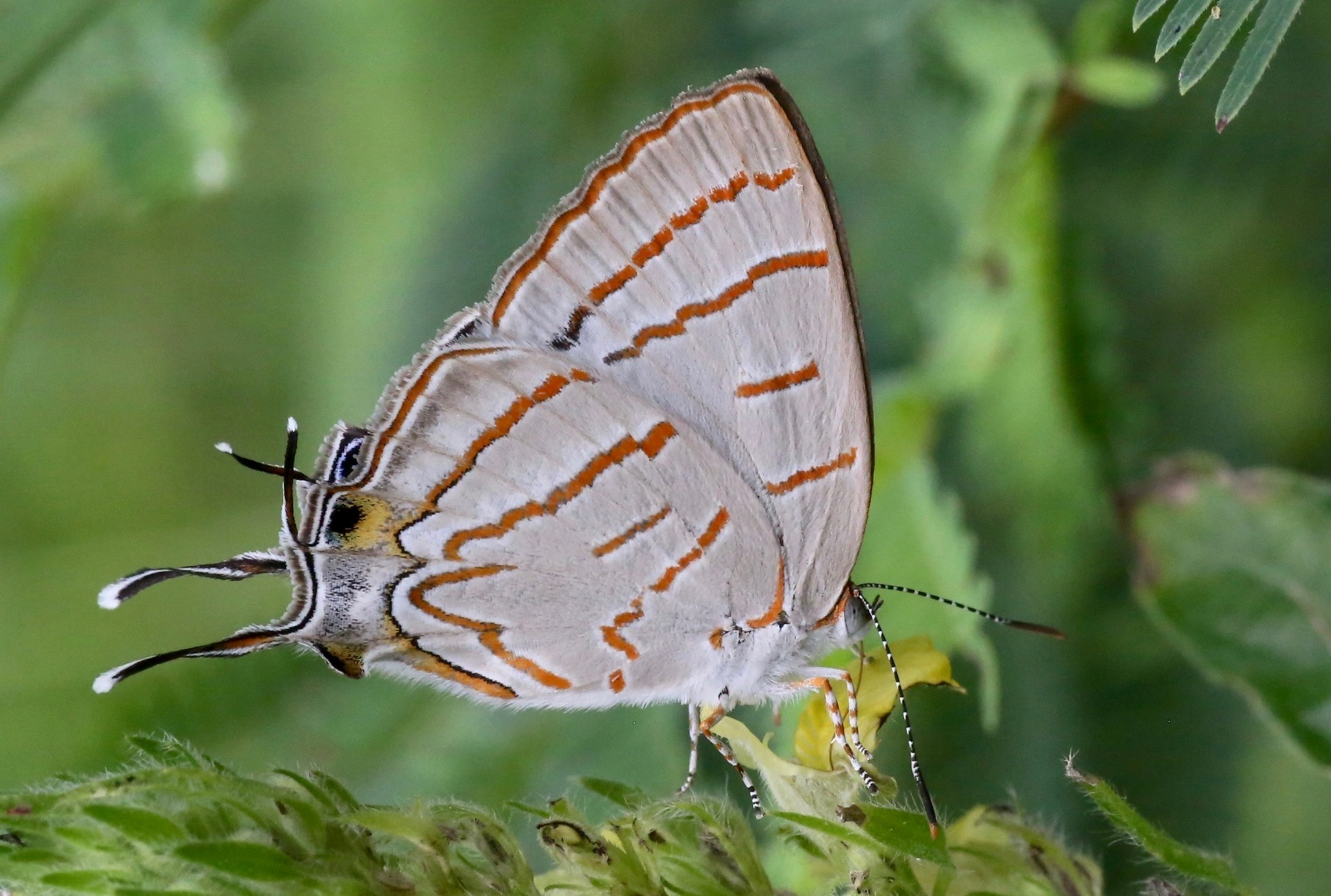
Hypolycaena caeculus

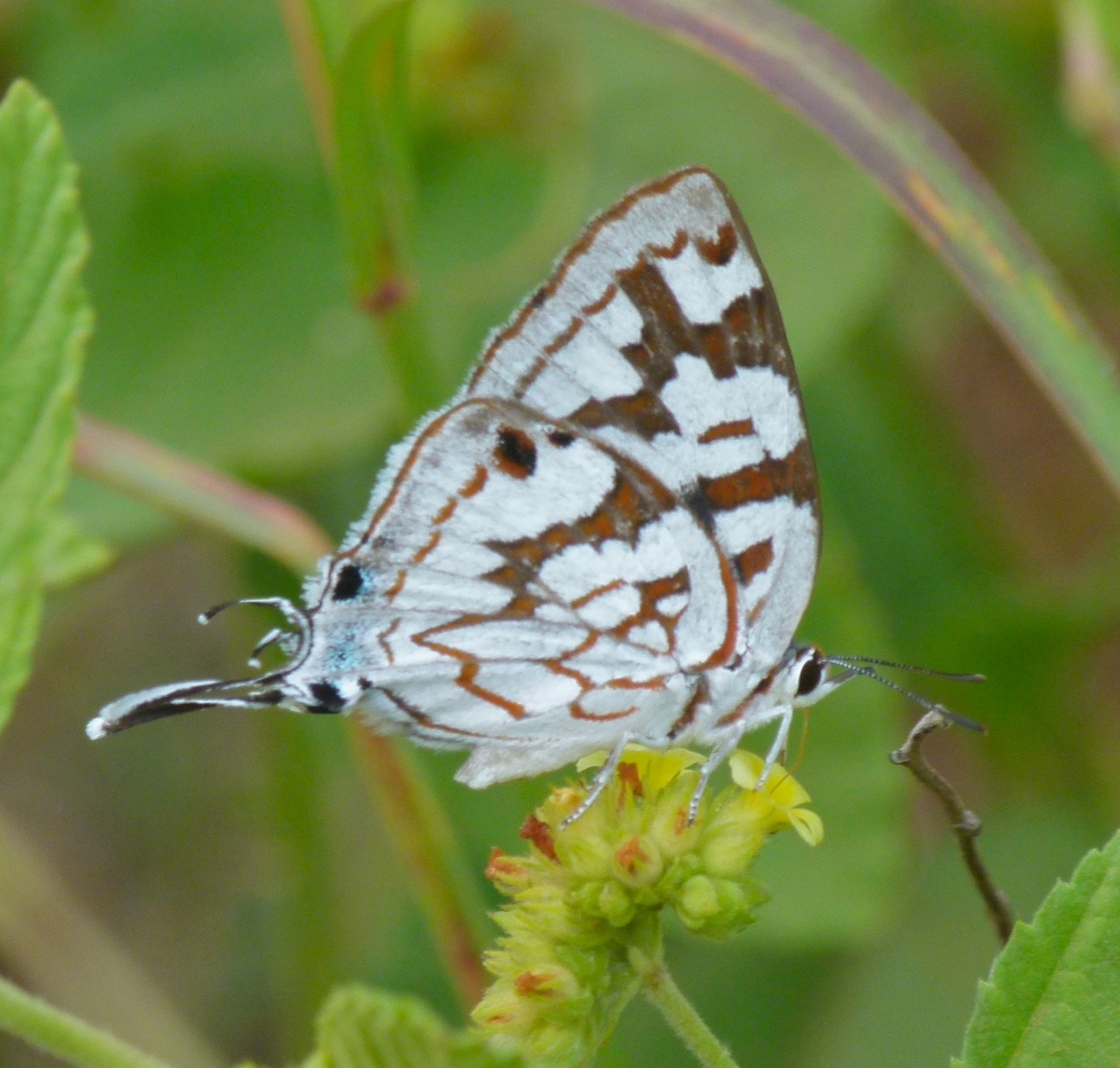
Iolaus bowkeri

- Hypolycaena caeculus
- Hypolycaena lochmophila
- Hypolycaena philippus
- Iolaus aemulus
- Iolaus alienus
- Iolaus aphnaeoides
- Iolaus bowkeri
- Iolaus diametra
- Iolaus lulua
- Iolaus mimosae
- Iolaus nasisii
- Iolaus pallene
- Iolaus sidus
- Iolaus silarus
- Iolaus silas
- Iolaus subinfuscata
- Iolaus trimeni
- Leptomyrina gorgias
- Leptomyrina henningi
- Leptomyrina hirundo
- Leptomyrina lara
- Myrina dermaptera
- Myrina silenus

=== Subfamily Lycaeninae ===
- Lycaena clarki
- Lycaena orus

=== Subfamily Polyommatinae ===
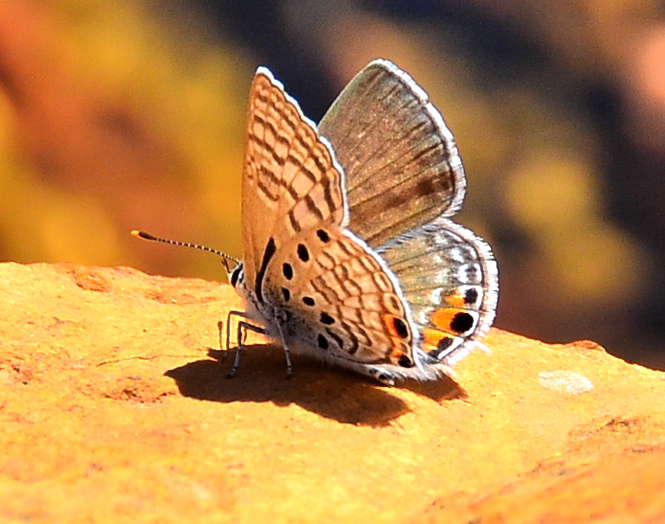
Anthene amarah

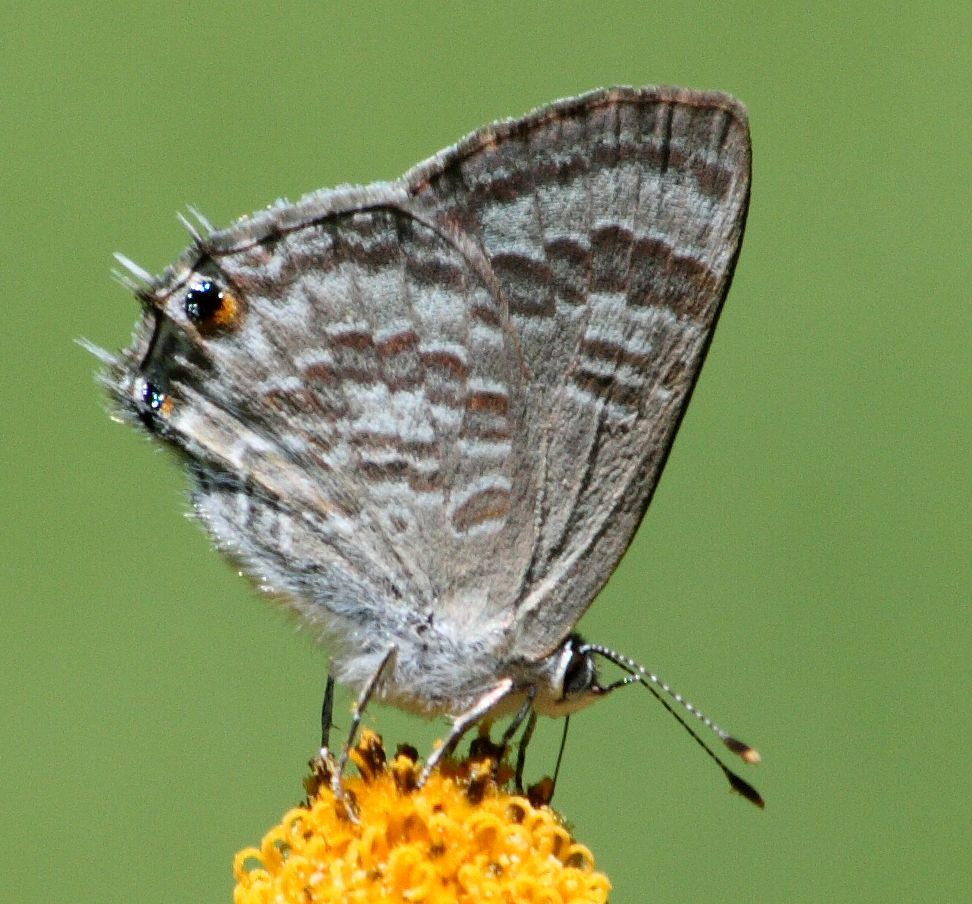
Anthene definita

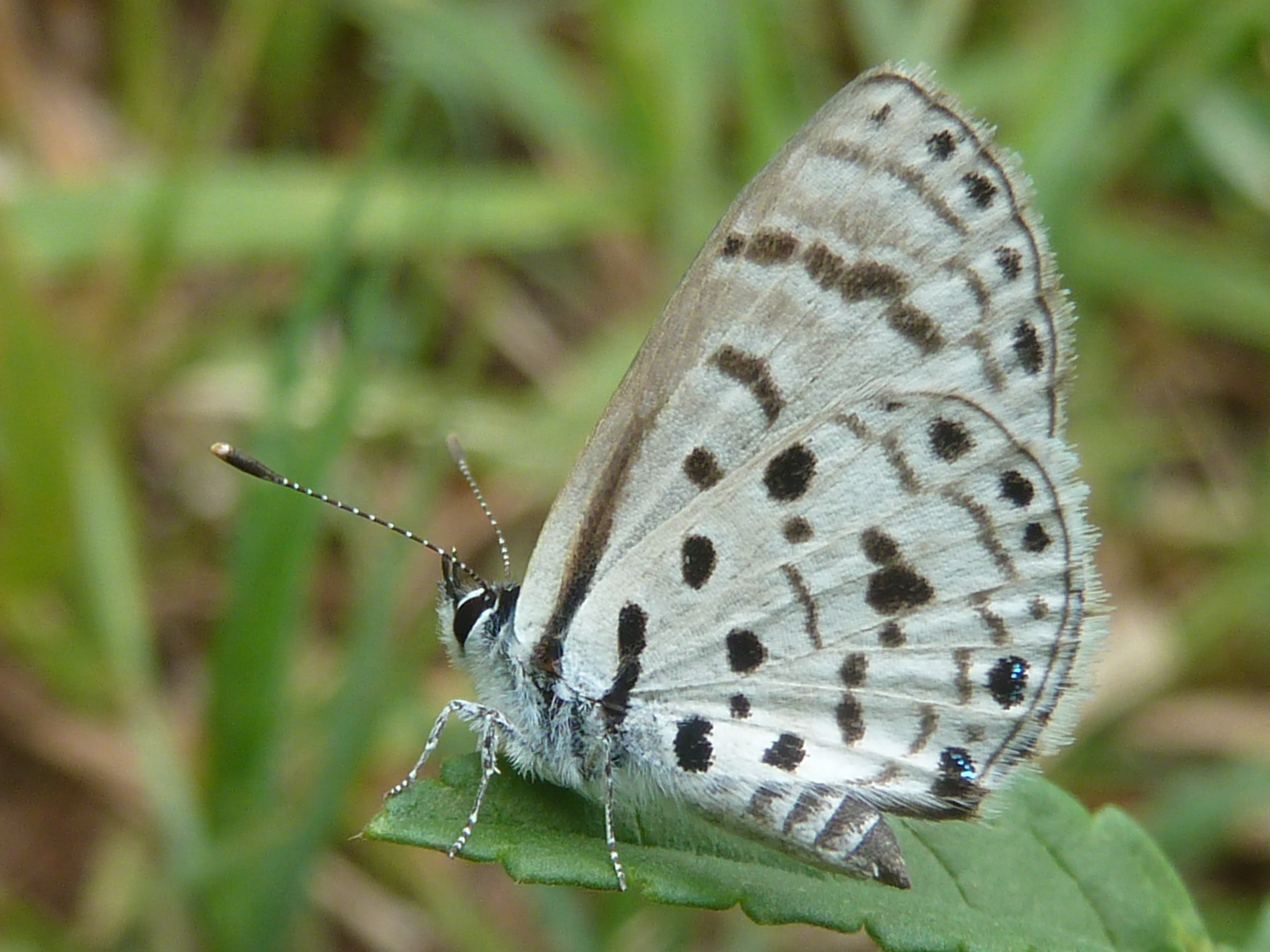
Azanus moriqua

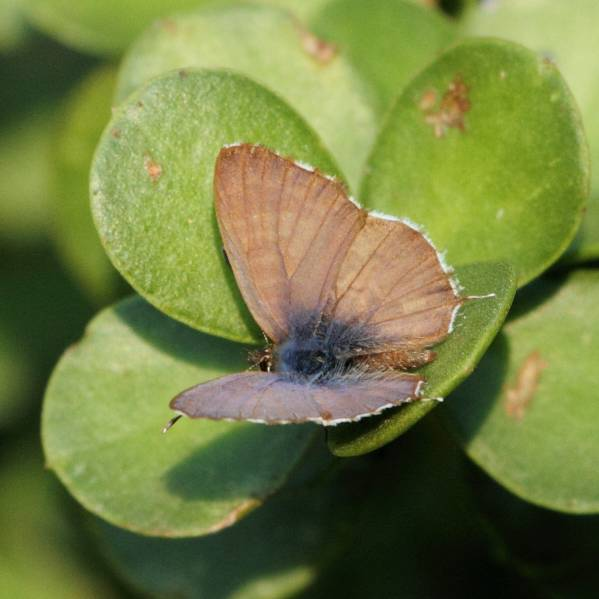
Cacyreus lingeus

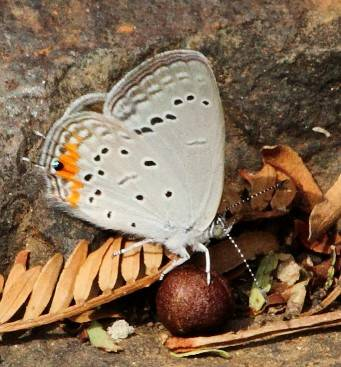
Cupidopsis jobates

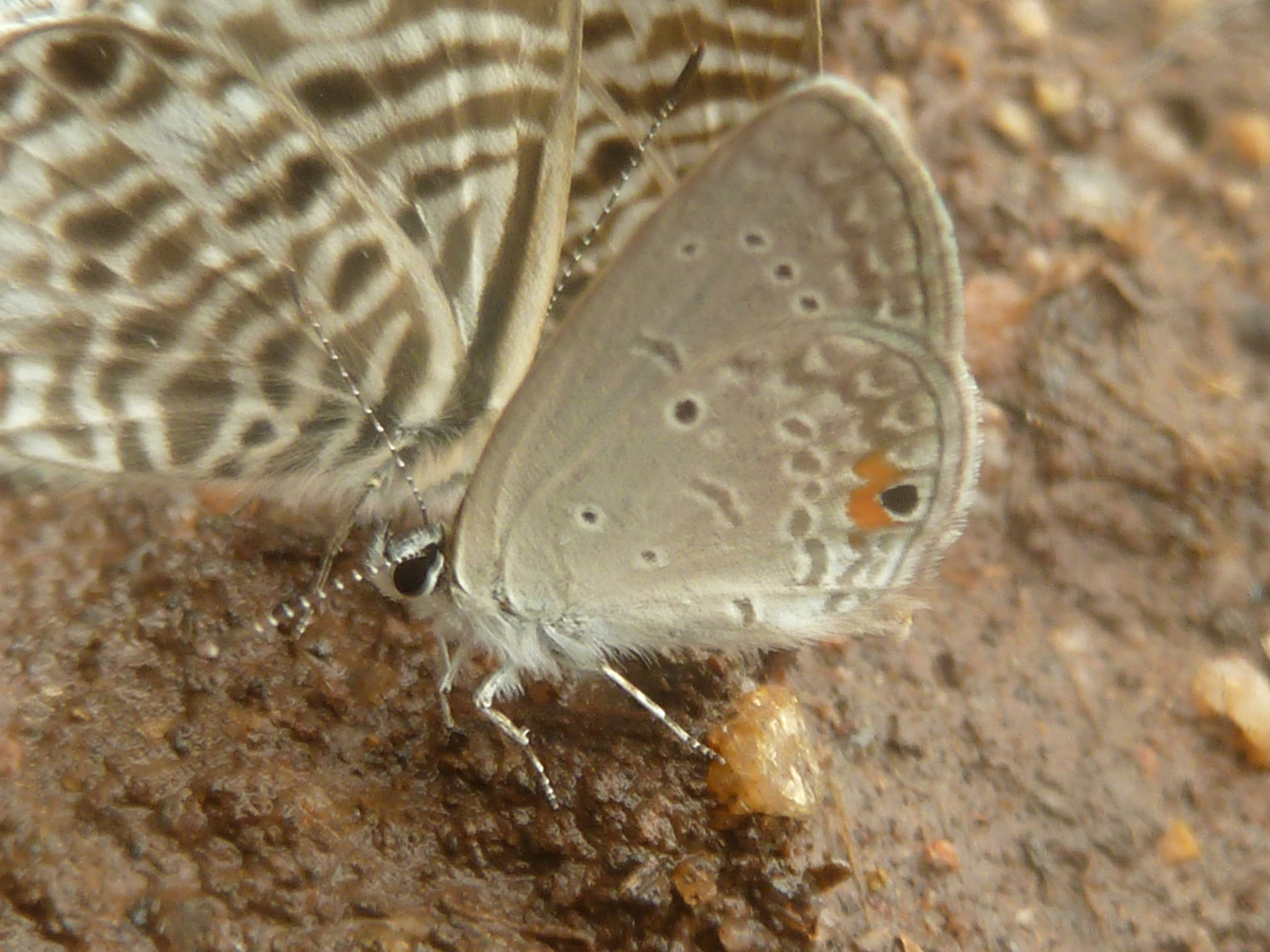
Eicochrysops messapus

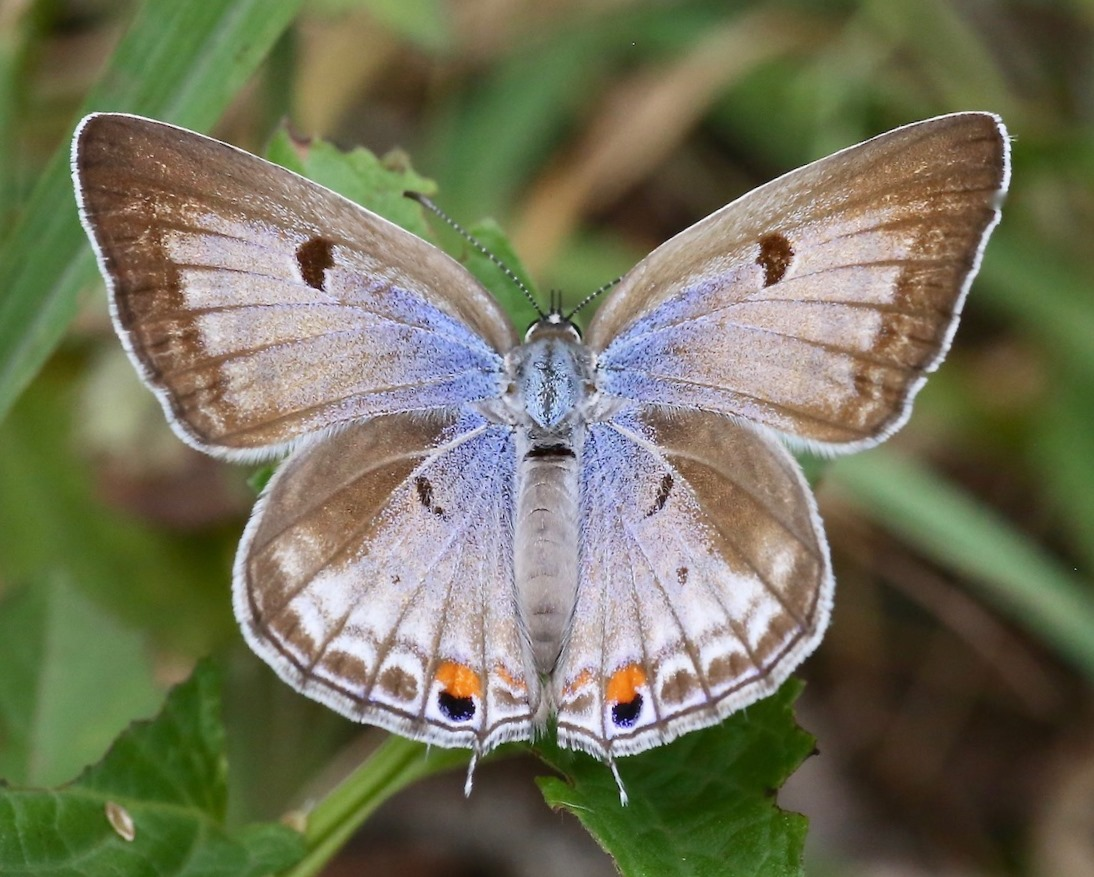
Lepidochrysops glauca

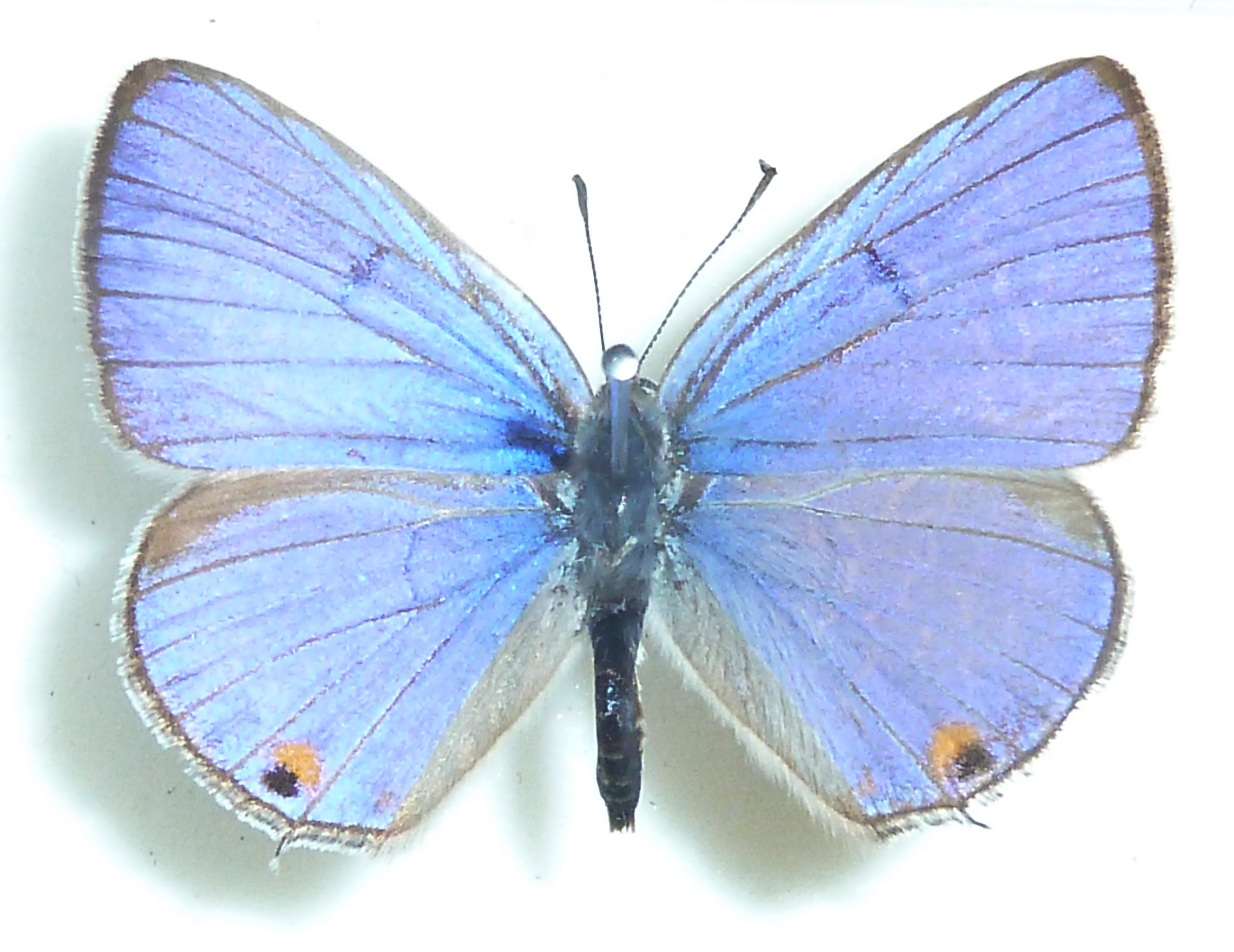
Lepidochrysops patricia

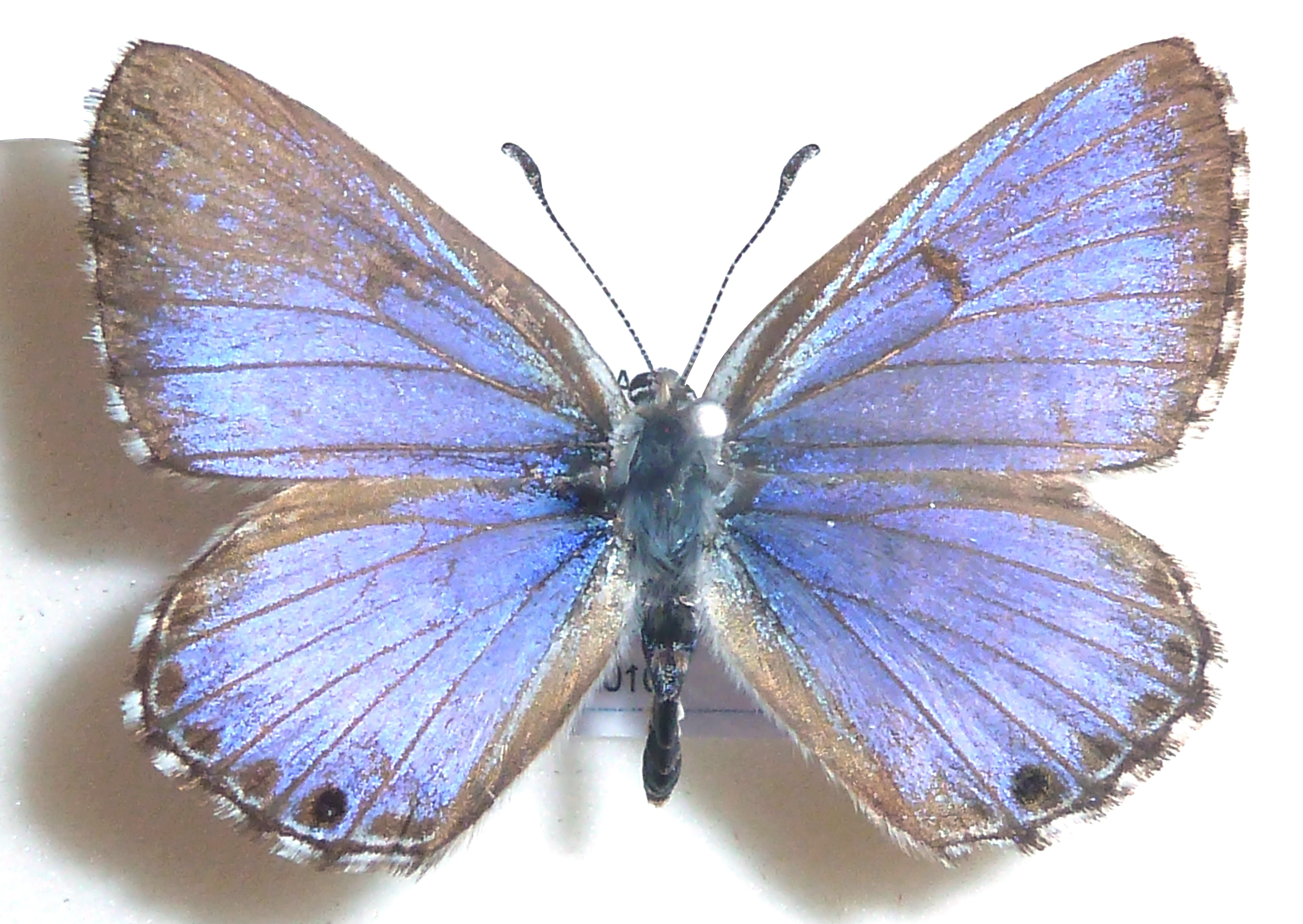
Lepidochrysops ortygia

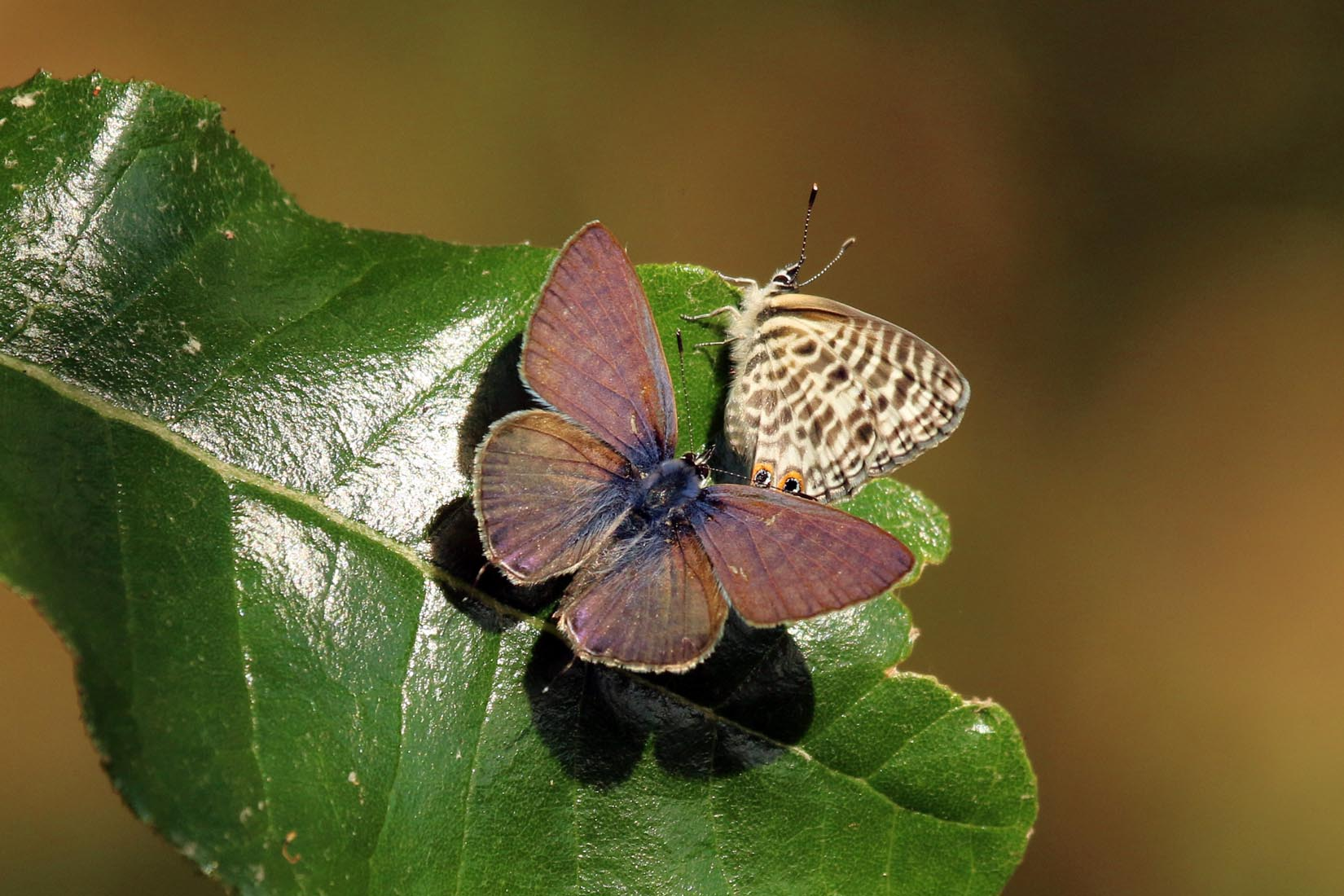
Leptotes pirithous, male and female

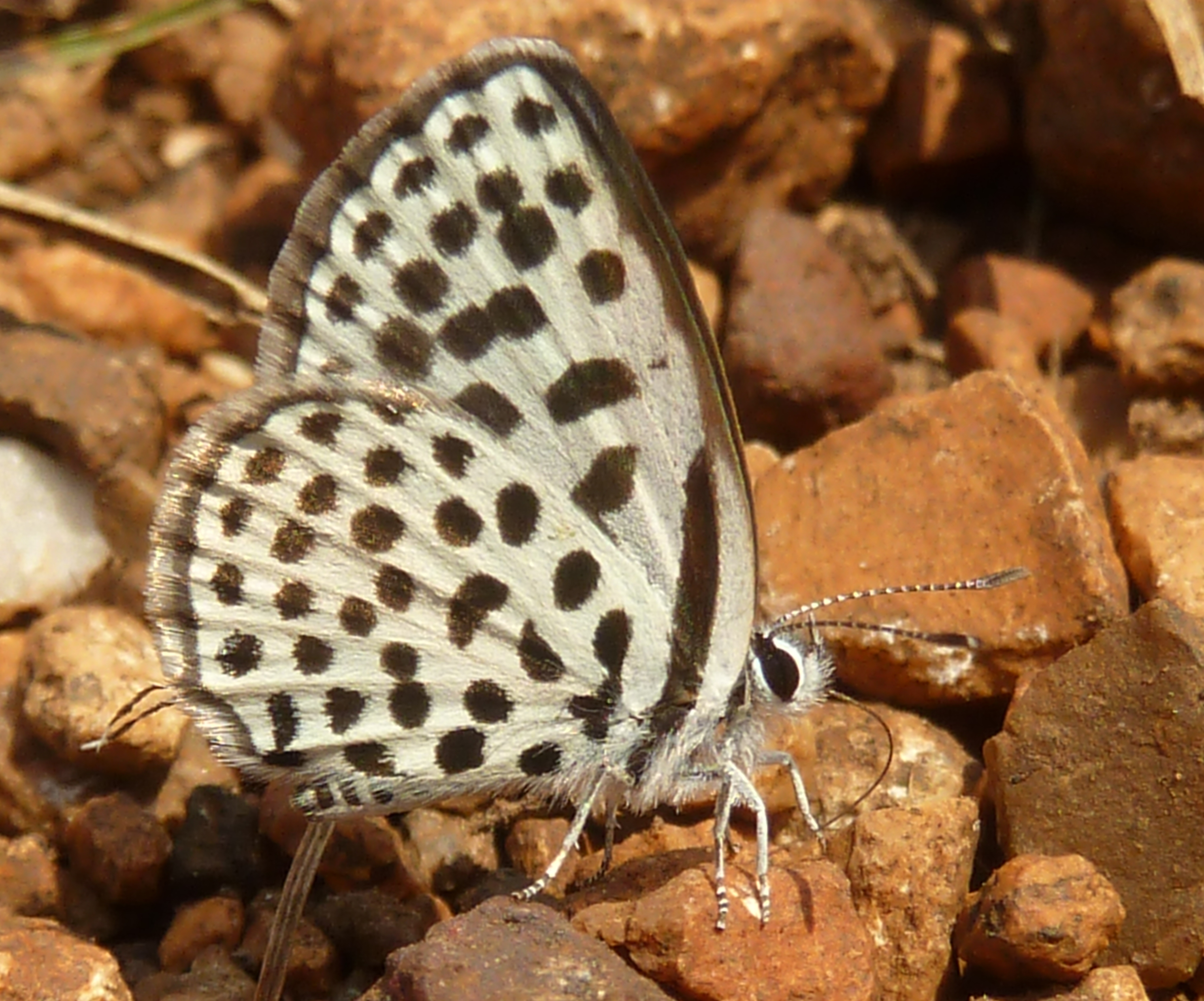
Tarucus sybaris

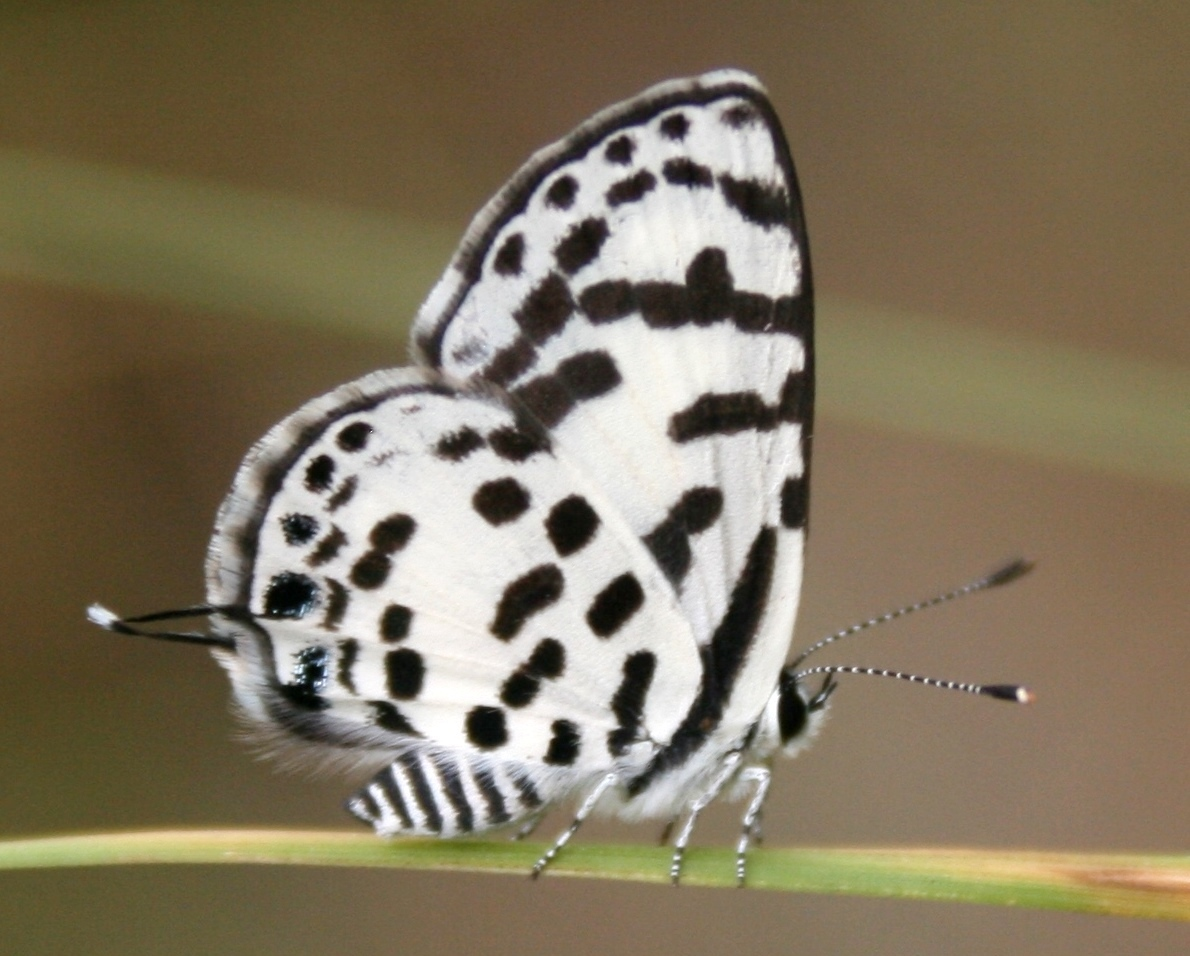
Tuxentius calice

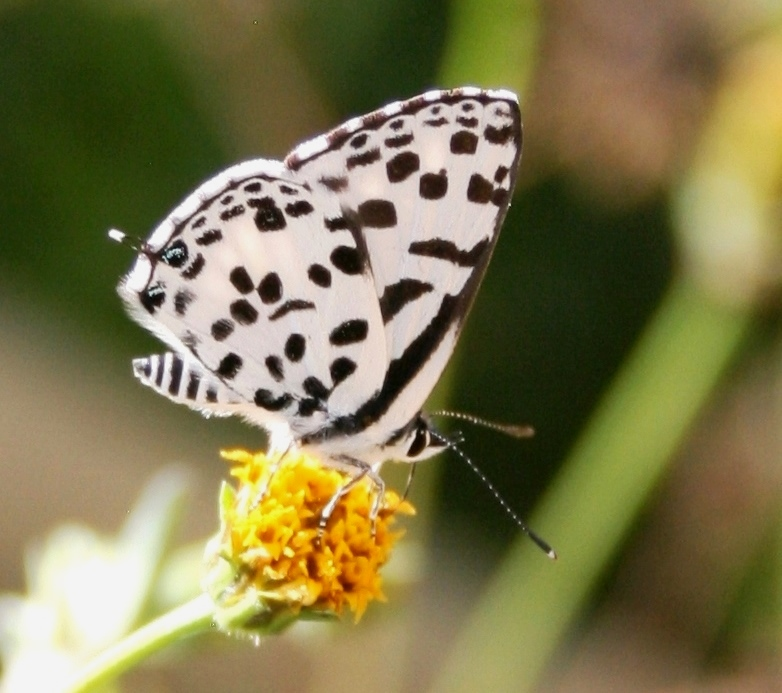
Zintha hintza

- Actizera lucida
- Actizera stellata
- Anthene amarah
- Anthene butleri
- Anthene contrastata
- Anthene crawshayi
- Anthene definita
- Anthene juanitae
- Anthene kersteni
- Anthene lemnos
- Anthene lindae
- Anthene liodes
- Anthene millari
- Anthene minima
- Anthene otacilia
- Anthene princeps
- Anthene talboti
- Azanus jesous
- Azanus mirza
- Azanus moriqua
- Azanus natalensis
- Azanus ubaldus
- Brephidium metophis
- Cacyreus dicksoni
- Cacyreus lingeus
- Cacyreus marshalli
- Cacyreus tespis
- Cacyreus virilis
- Cupidopsis cissus
- Cupidopsis jobates
- Eicochrysops hippocrates
- Eicochrysops messapus
- Euchrysops barkeri
- Euchrysops dolorosa
- Euchrysops malathana
- Euchrysops osiris
- Euchrysops subpallida
- Freyeria trochylus
- Harpendyreus noquasa
- Harpendyreus notoba
- Harpendyreus tsomo
- Lampides boeticus
- Lepidochrysops asteris
- Lepidochrysops australis
- Lepidochrysops bacchus
- Lepidochrysops badhami
- Lepidochrysops balli
- Lepidochrysops braueri
- Lepidochrysops dukei
- Lepidochrysops glauca
- Lepidochrysops grahami
- Lepidochrysops gydoae
- Lepidochrysops ignota
- Lepidochrysops irvingi
- Lepidochrysops jamesi
- Lepidochrysops jefferyi
- Lepidochrysops ketsi
- Lepidochrysops lerothodi
- Lepidochrysops letsea
- Lepidochrysops littoralis
- Lepidochrysops loewensteini
- Lepidochrysops lotana
- Lepidochrysops macgregori
- Lepidochrysops methymna
- Lepidochrysops oosthuizeni
- Lepidochrysops oreas
- Lepidochrysops ortygia
- Lepidochrysops outeniqua
- Lepidochrysops patricia
- Lepidochrysops penningtoni
- Lepidochrysops pephredo
- Lepidochrysops plebeia
- Lepidochrysops poseidon
- Lepidochrysops praeterita
- Lepidochrysops pringlei
- Lepidochrysops procera
- Lepidochrysops puncticilia
- Lepidochrysops quickelbergei
- Lepidochrysops robertsoni
- Lepidochrysops rossouwi
- Lepidochrysops southeyae
- Lepidochrysops swanepoeli
- Lepidochrysops swartbergensis
- Lepidochrysops tantalus
- Lepidochrysops titei
- Lepidochrysops trimeni
- Lepidochrysops vansoni
- Lepidochrysops variabilis
- Lepidochrysops victori
- Lepidochrysops wykehami
- Leptotes babaulti
- Leptotes brevidentatus
- Leptotes jeanneli
- Leptotes pirithous
- Leptotes pulchra
- Orachrysops ariadne
- Orachrysops brinkmani
- Orachrysops lacrimosa
- Orachrysops mijburghi
- Orachrysops montanus
- Orachrysops nasutus
- Orachrysops niobe
- Orachrysops regalis
- Orachrysops subravus
- Orachrysops violescens
- Orachrysops warreni
- Oraidium barberae
- Pseudonacaduba sichela
- Tarucus bowkeri
- Tarucus sybaris
- Tarucus thespis
- Tuxentius calice
- Tuxentius hesperis
- Tuxentius melaena
- Uranothauma nubifer
- Zintha hintza
- Zizeeria knysna
- Zizina antanossa
- Zizula hylax

== Family Pieridae ==
=== Subfamily Pierinae ===
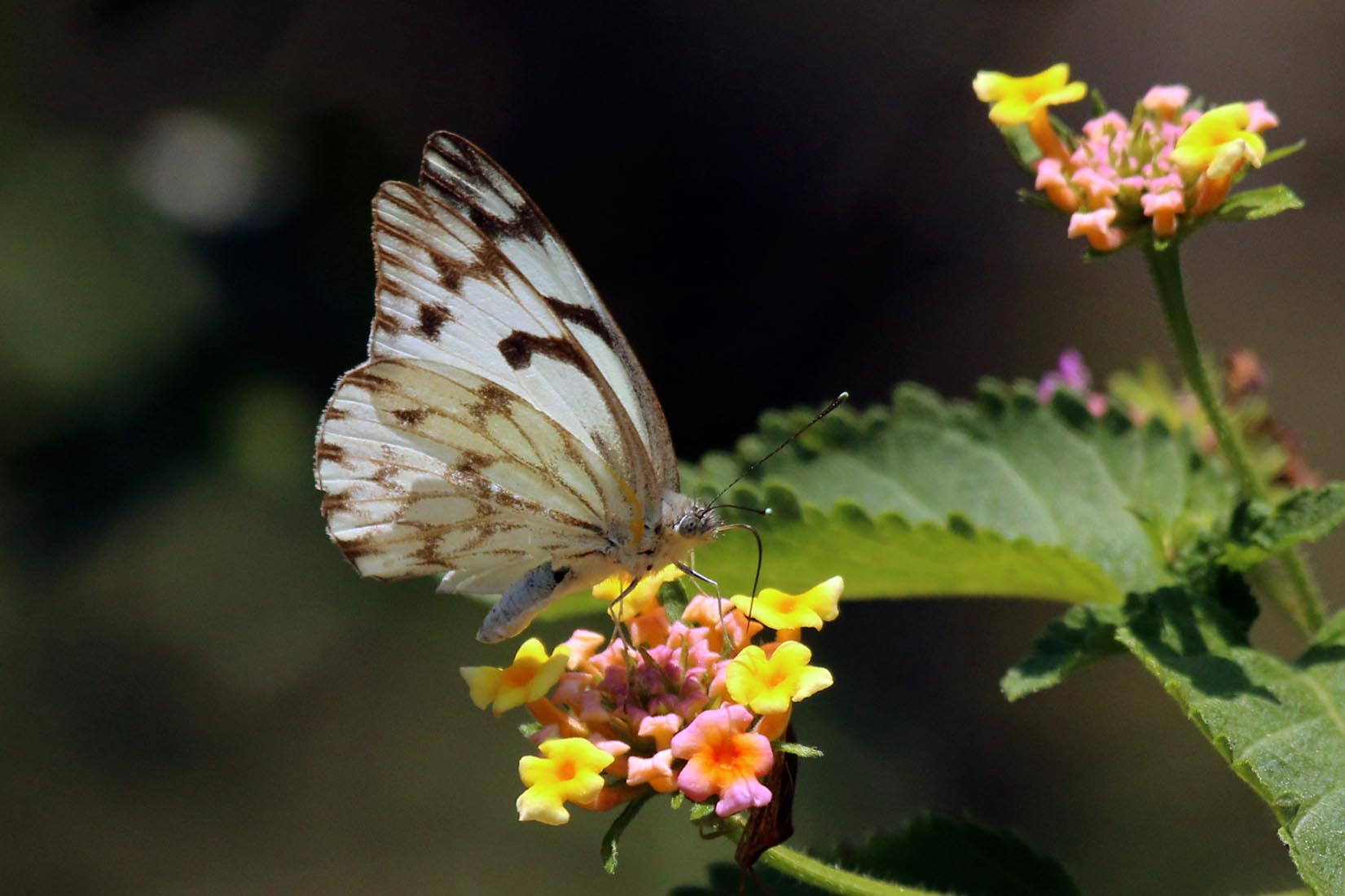
Male Belenois aurota

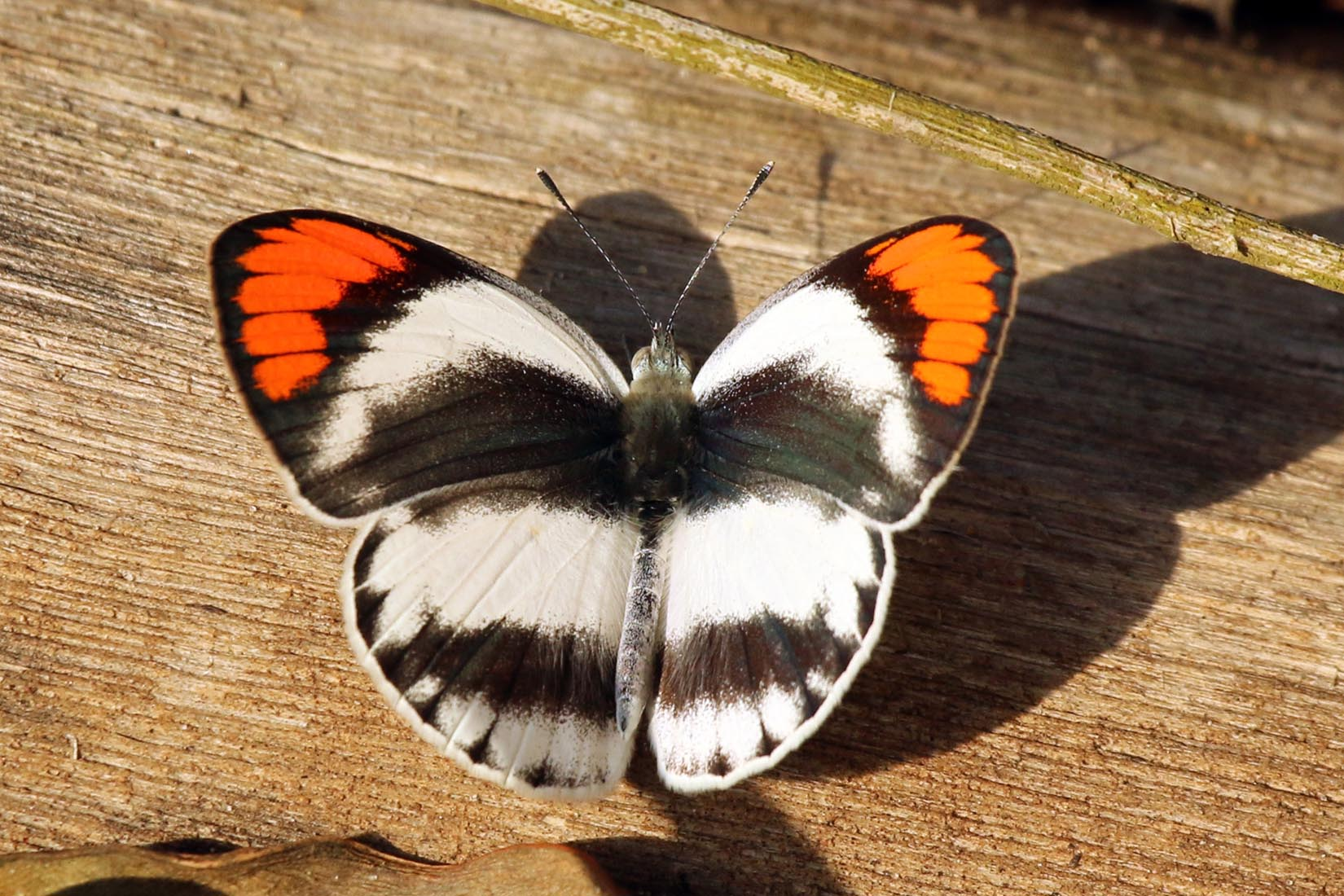
Male Colotis euippe

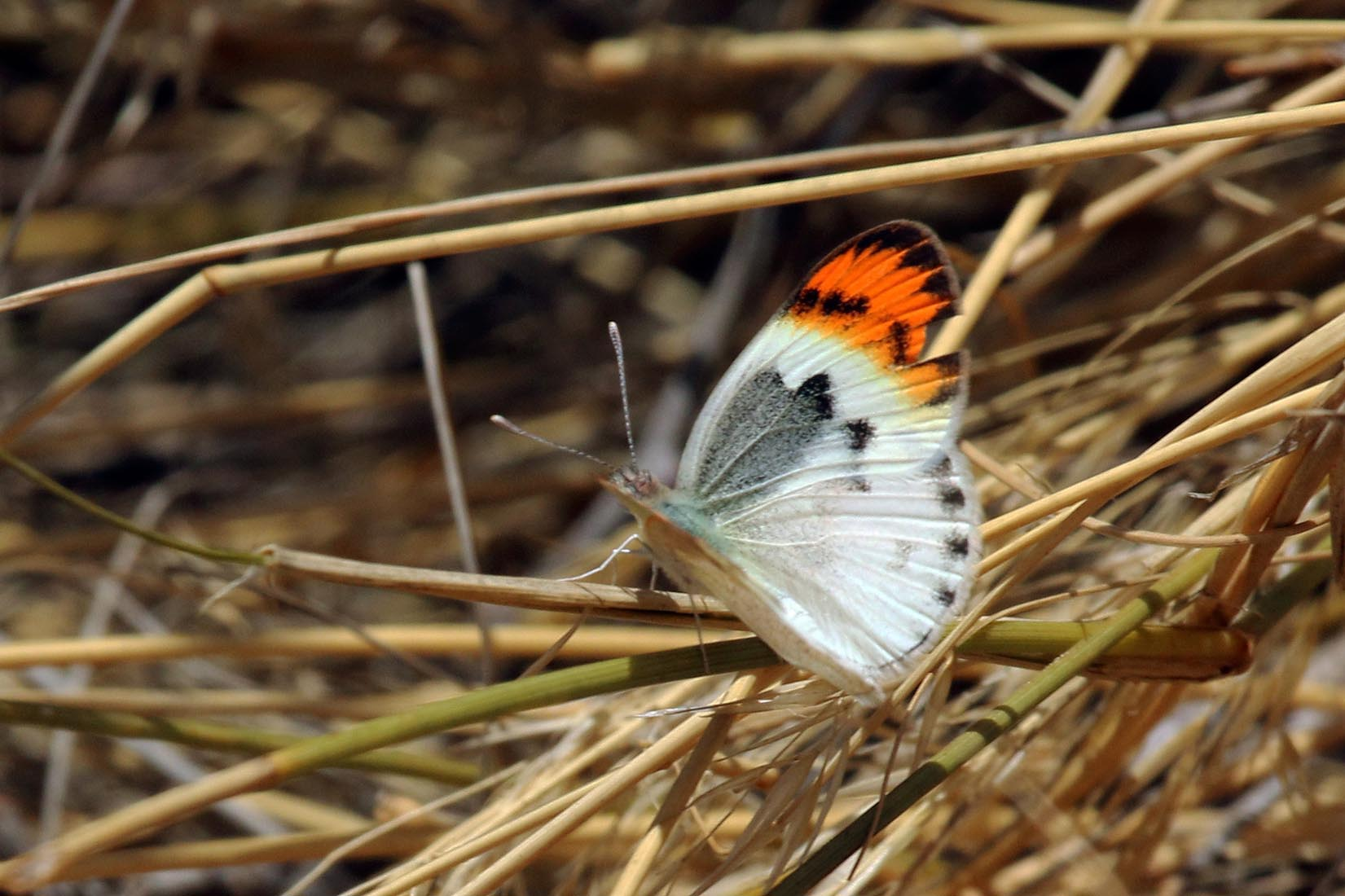
Female Colotis evenina

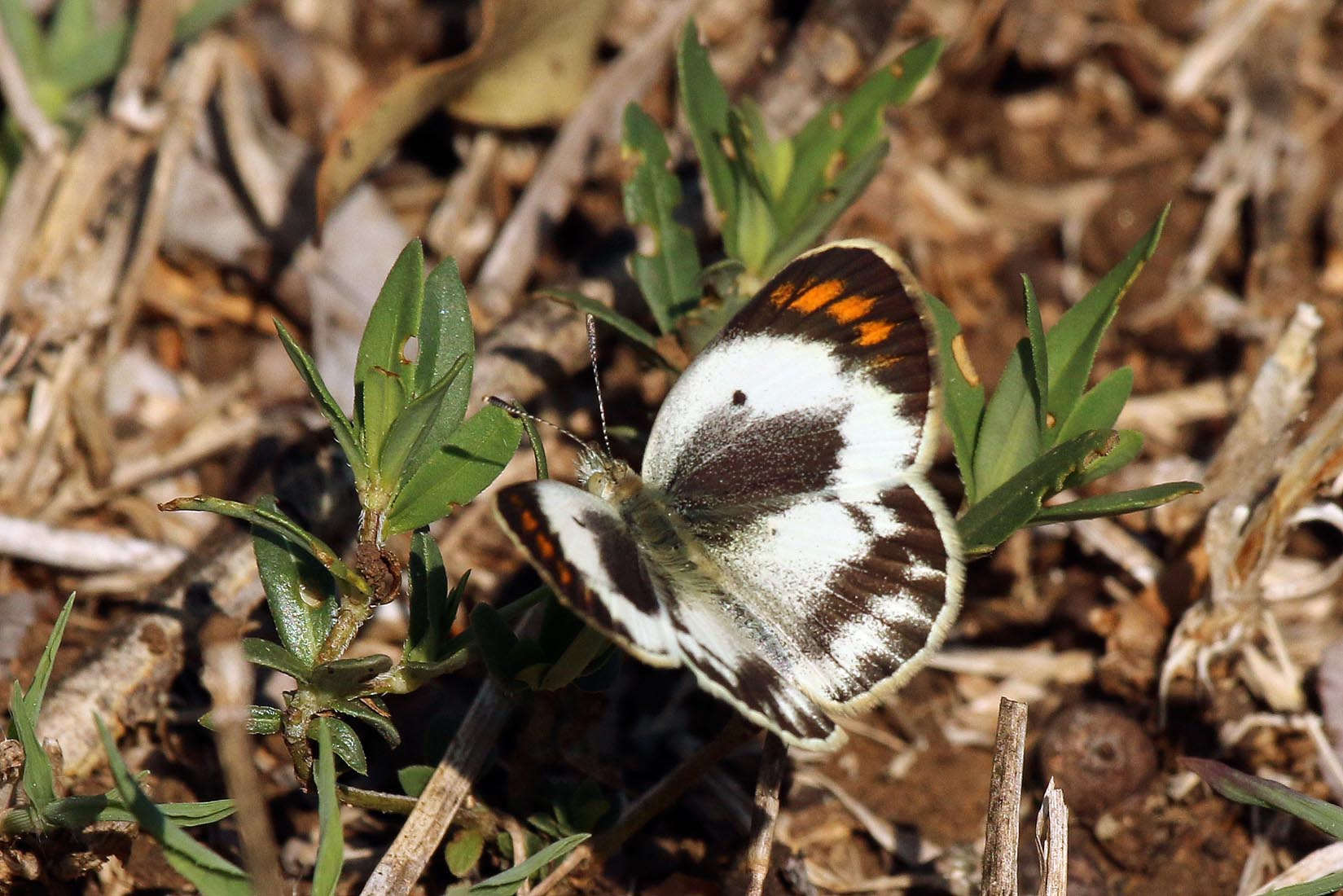
Colotis pallene

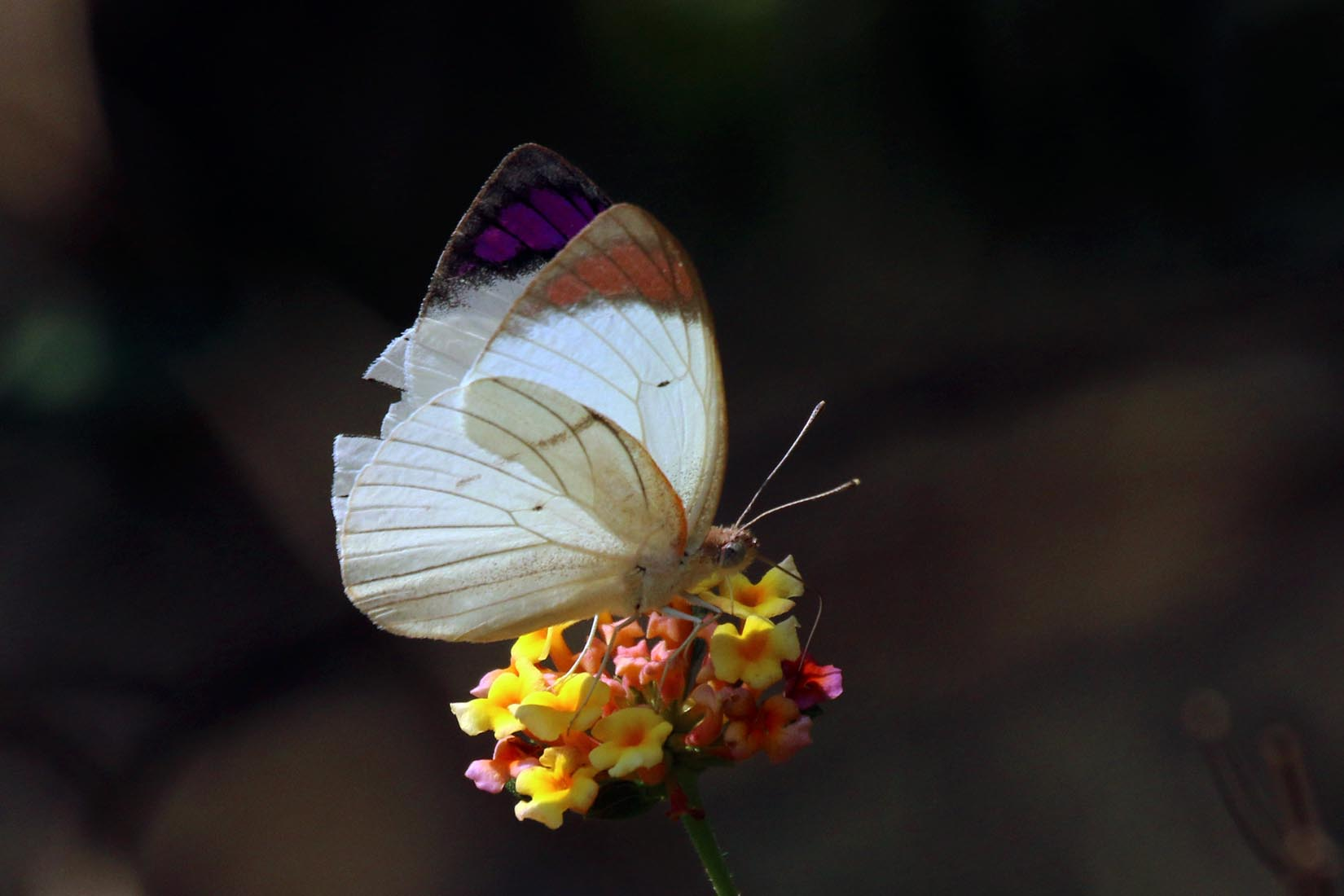
Colotis regina

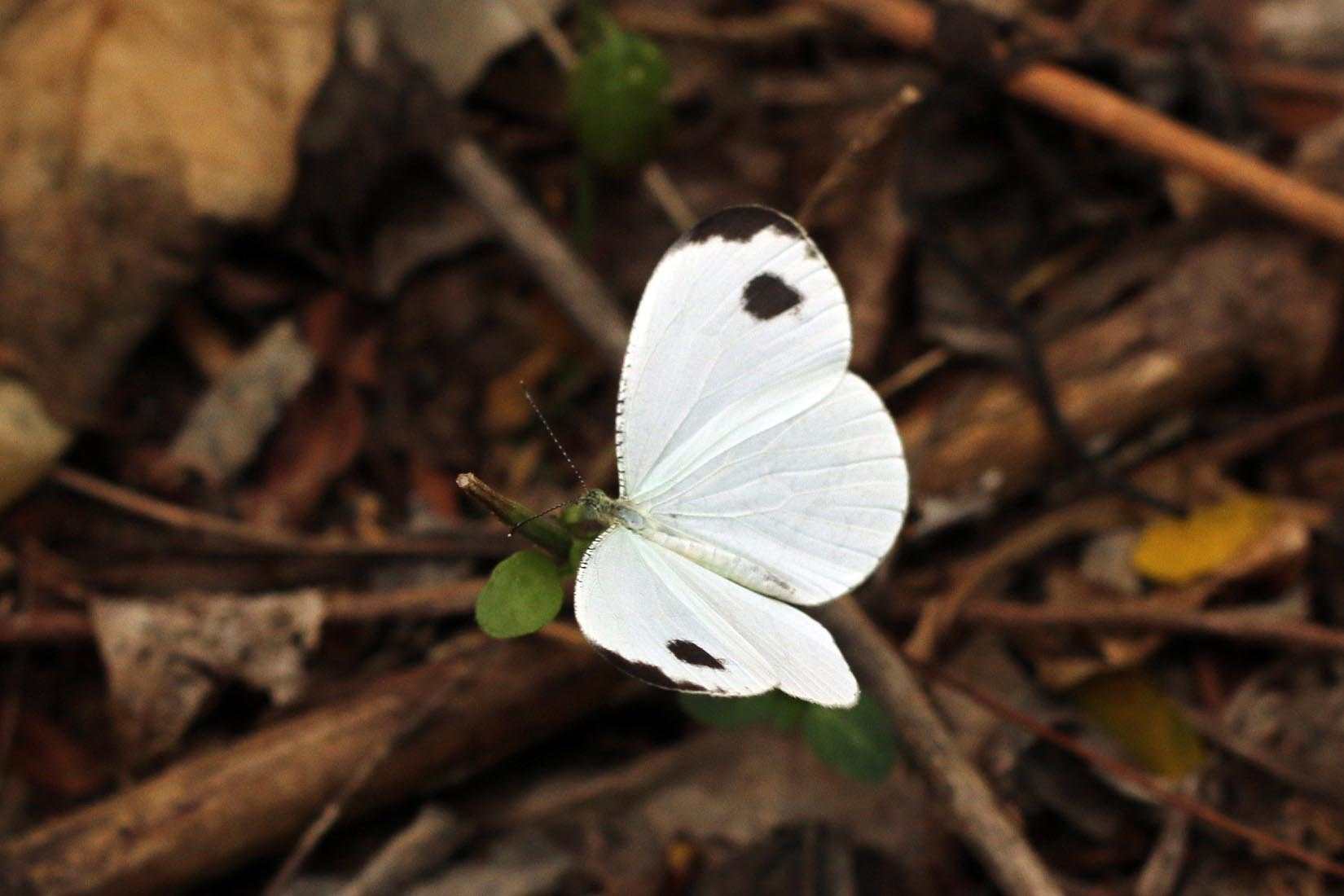
Leptosia alcesta
- Appias epaphia
- Appias sabina
- Belenois aurota
- Belenois creona
- Belenois gidica
- Belenois thysa
- Belenois zochalia
- Colotis agoye
- Colotis amata
- Colotis antevippe
- Colotis auxo
- Colotis celimene
- Colotis danae
- Colotis doubledayi
- Colotis eris
- Colotis erone
- Colotis euippe
- Colotis evagore
- Colotis evenina
- Colotis ione
- Colotis lais
- Colotis pallene
- Colotis regina
- Colotis subfasciatus
- Colotis vesta
- Dixeia charina
- Dixeia doxo
- Dixeia pigea
- Dixeia spilleri
- Eronia cleodora
- Eronia leda
- Leptosia alcesta
- Mylothris agathina
- Mylothris rueppellii
- Mylothris trimenia
- Nepheronia argia
- Nepheronia buquetii
- Nepheronia thalassina
- Pieris brassicae
- Pinacopteryx eriphia
- Pontia helice
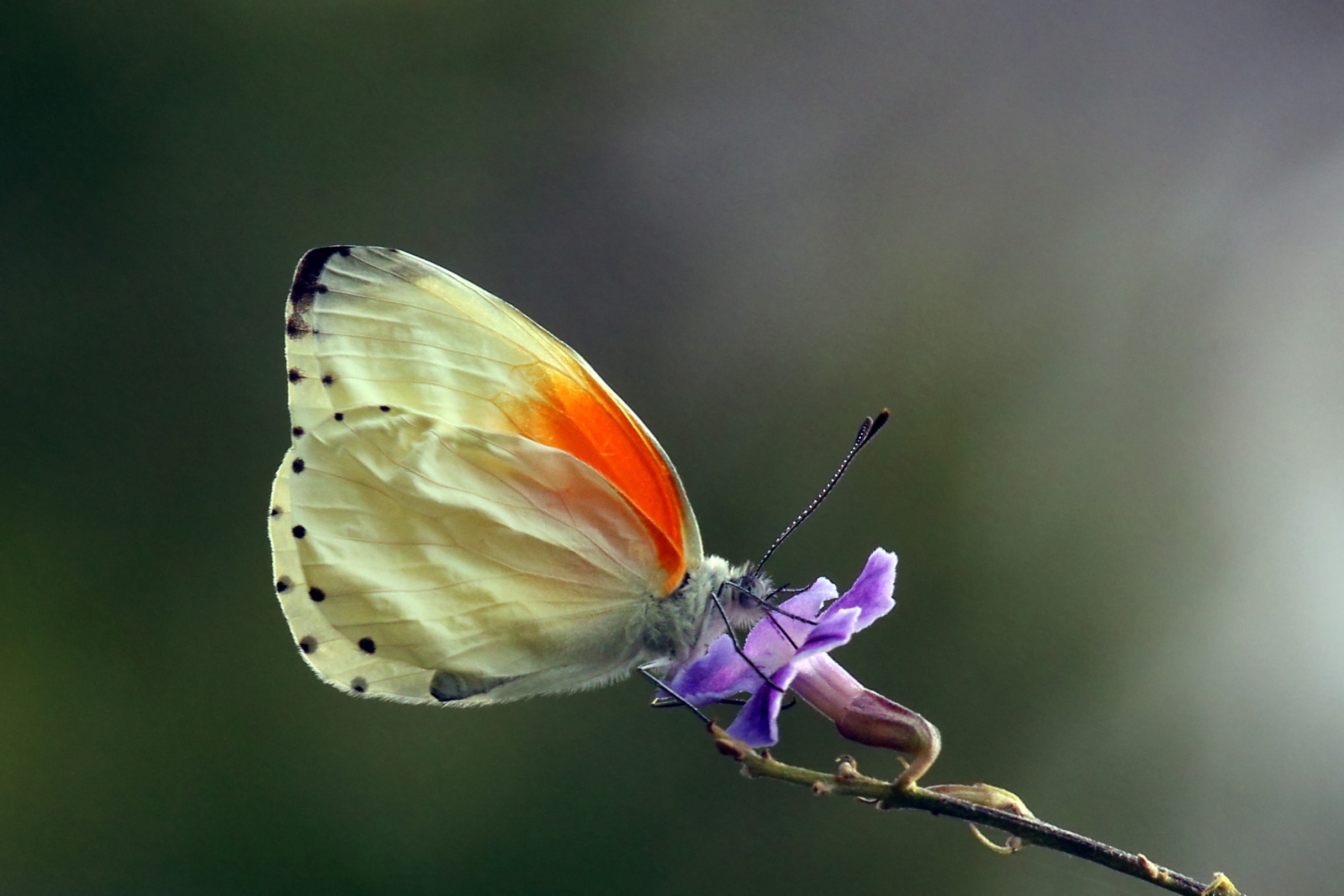
Mylothris rueppellii haemus

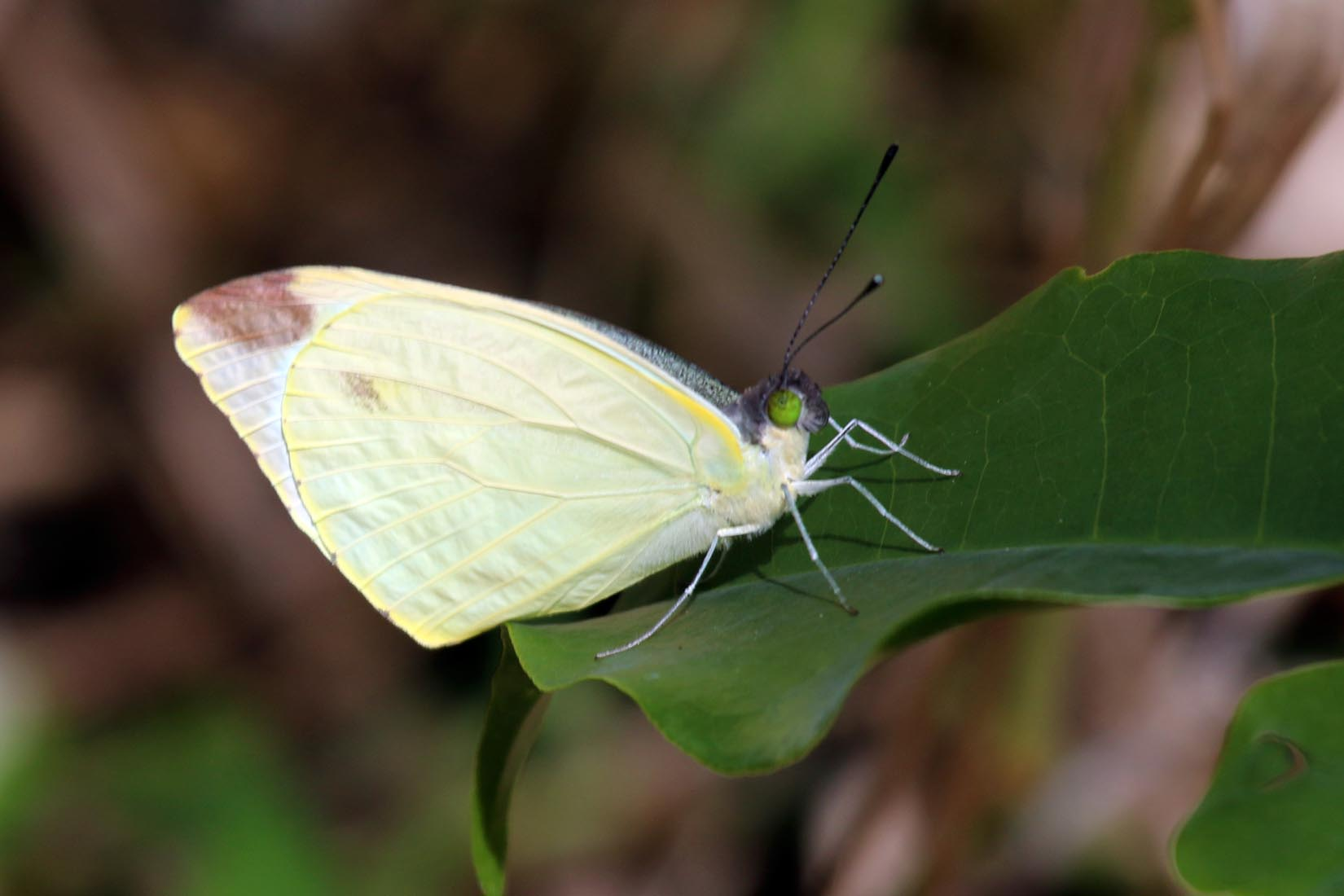
Male Nepheronia argia varia

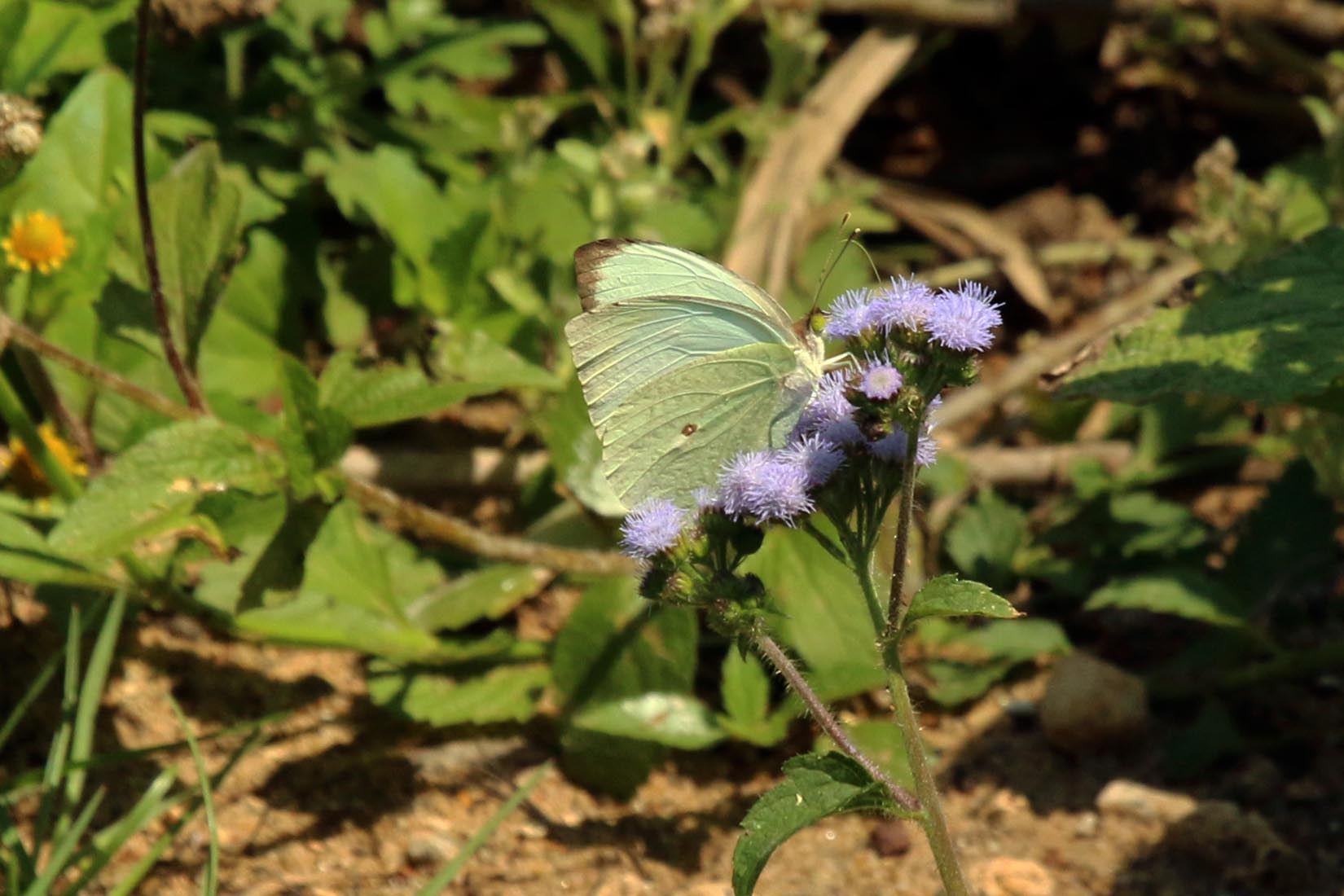
Male Nepheronia buquetii

=== Subfamily Coliadinae ===
- Catopsilia florella
- Colias electo
- Eurema brigitta
- Eurema desjardinsii
- Eurema hecabe

== Family Papilionidae ==
=== Subfamily Papilioninae ===
- Graphium angolanus
- Graphium antheus
- Graphium colonna
- Graphium leonidas
- Graphium morania
- Graphium policenes
- Graphium porthaon
- Papilio constantinus
- Papilio dardanus
- Papilio demodocus
- Papilio echerioides
- Papilio euphranor
- Papilio nireus
- Papilio ophidicephalus
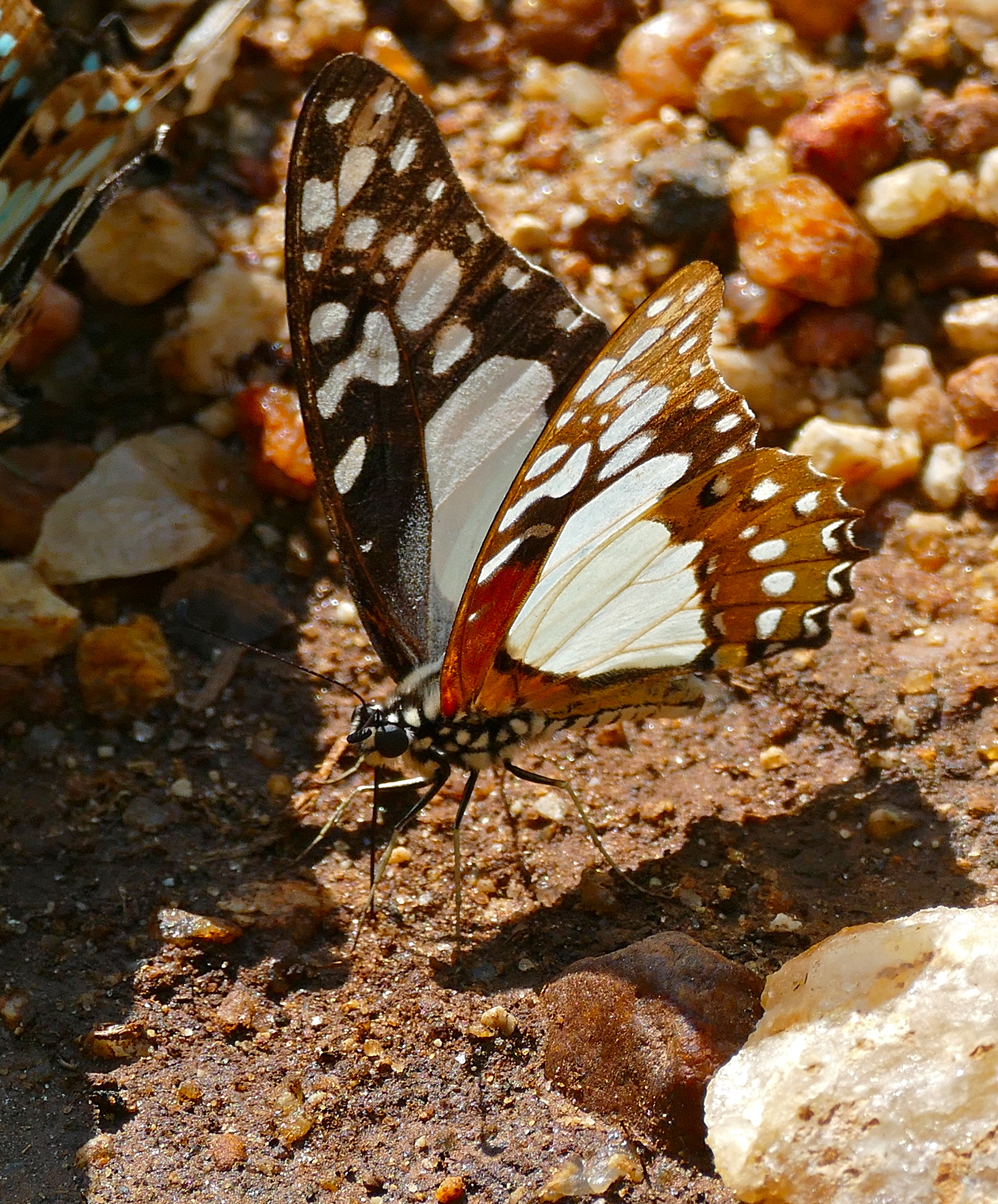
Graphium angolanus

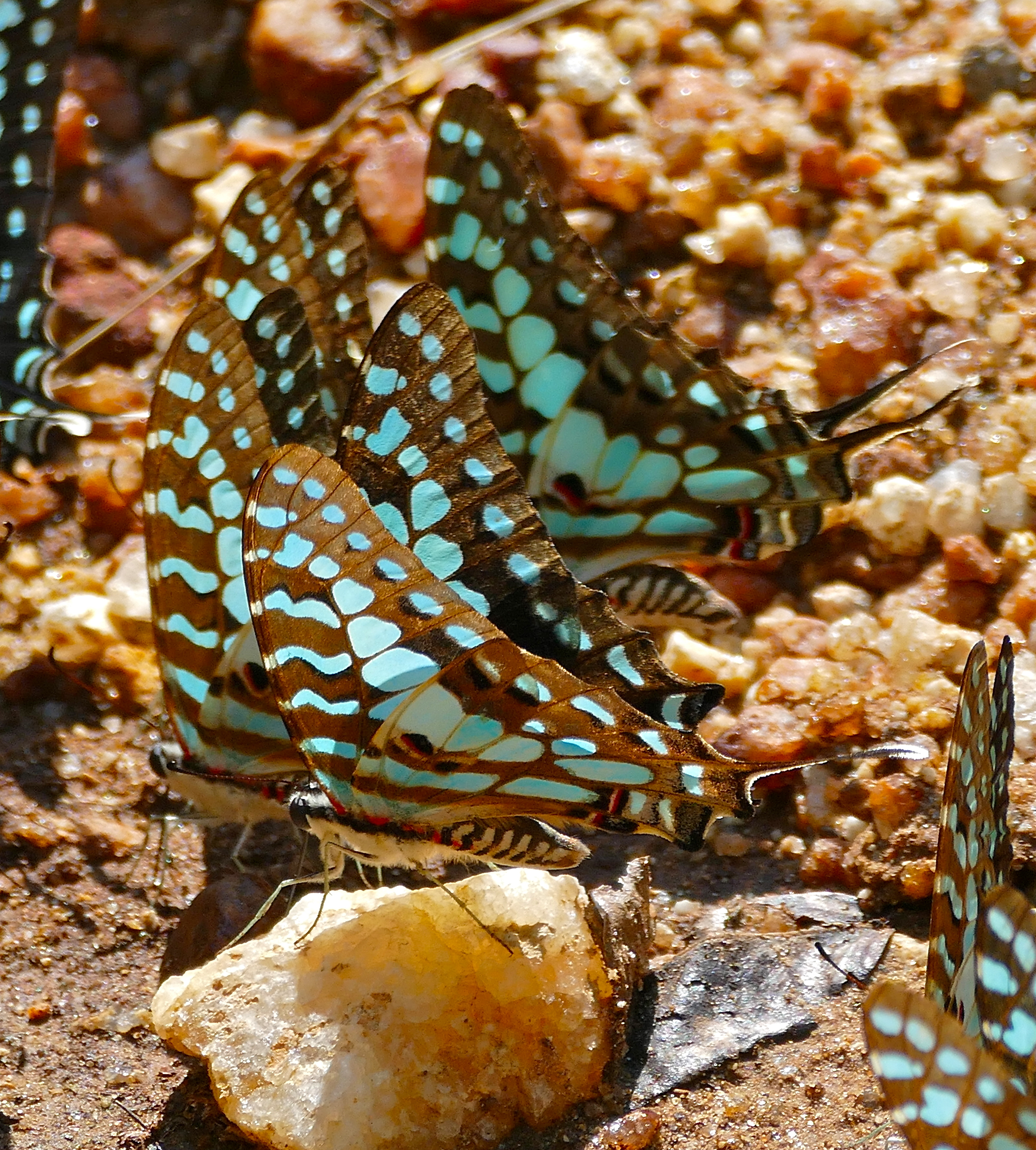
Graphium antheus

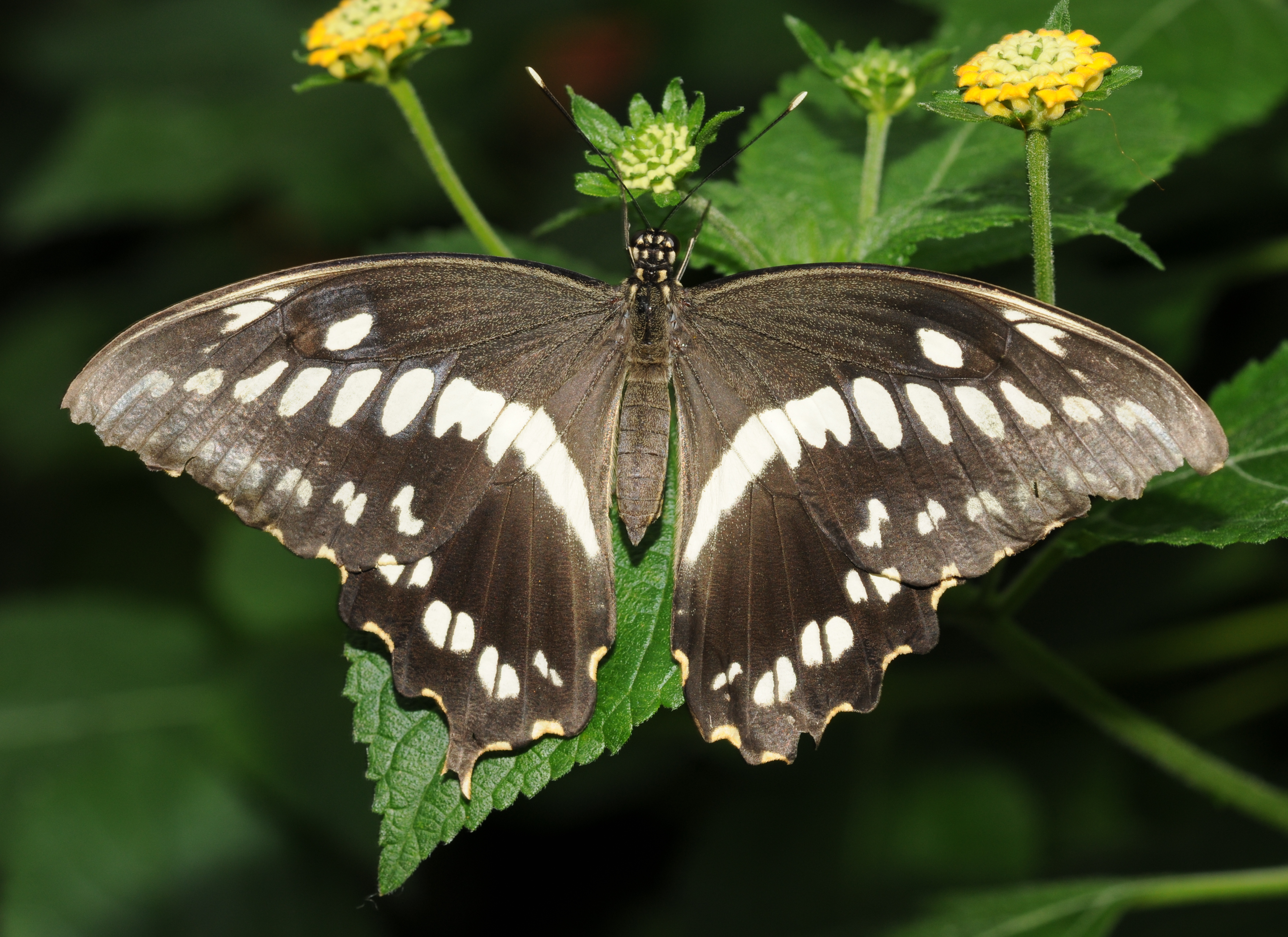
Papilio constantinus

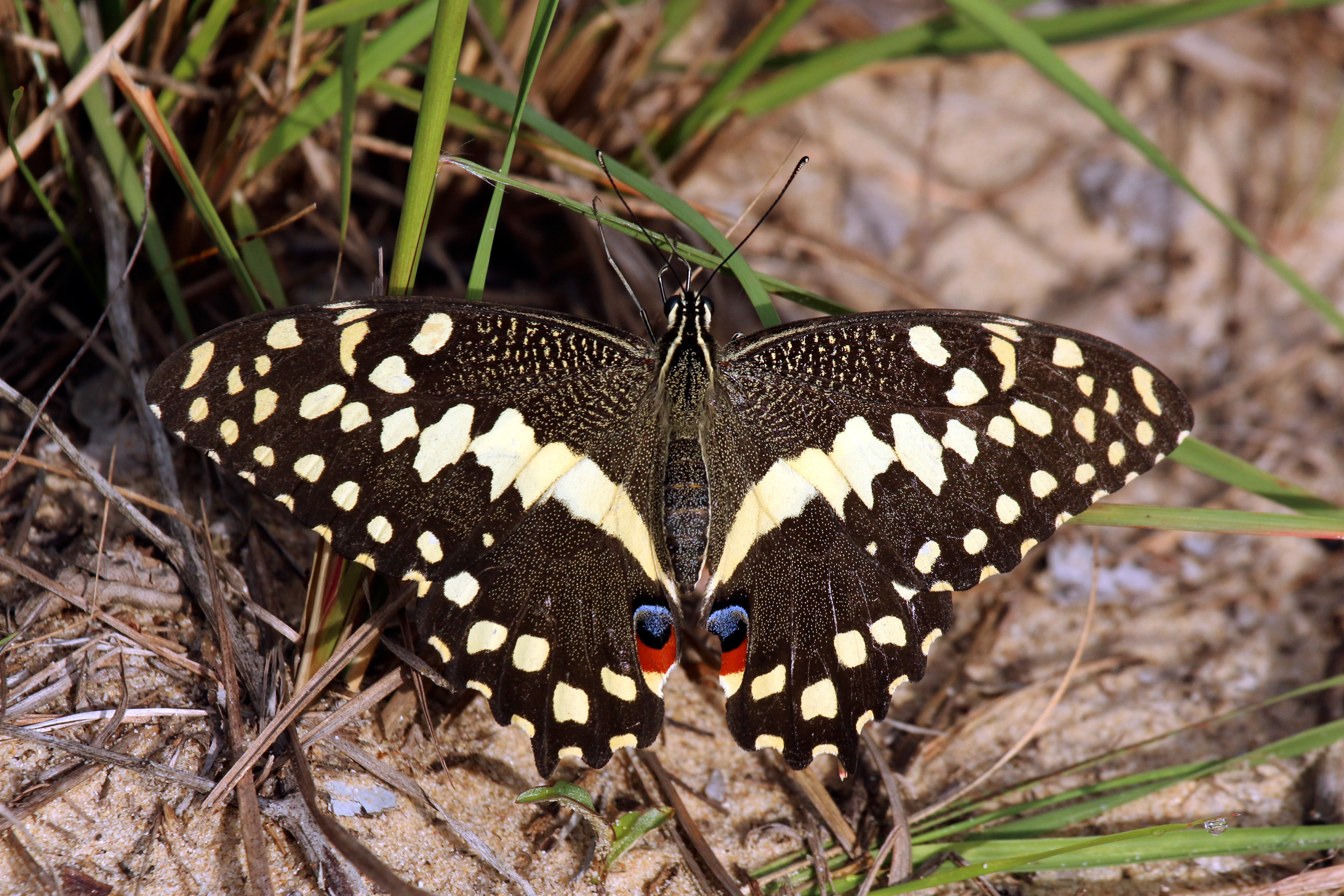
Papilio demodocus

== See also ==
- List of moths of South Africa
