= Lepidochrysops jefferyi =

Conservation status
- Critically Endangered (IUCN 3.1)

Scientific classification
- Kingdom: Animalia
- Phylum: Arthropoda
- Class: Insecta
- Order: Lepidoptera
- Family: Lycaenidae
- Genus: Lepidochrysops
- Species: L. jefferyi

Binomial name
- Lepidochrysops jefferyi (Swierstra, 1909)

Synonyms
- Lycaena jefferyi Swierstra, 1909; Neochrysops jefferyi

Species of butterfly

Lepidochrysops jefferyi, the Jeffery's blue, is a species of butterfly in the family Lycaenidae. It is endemic to South Africa, where it known from grassland on the hills above Ulundi, Fairview and the Sheba Mines in Mpumalanga.

The wingspan is 38–44 mm for males and 42–46 mm for females. Adults are on wing from October to November. There is one generation per year.

The larvae feed on Becium grandiflorum.
