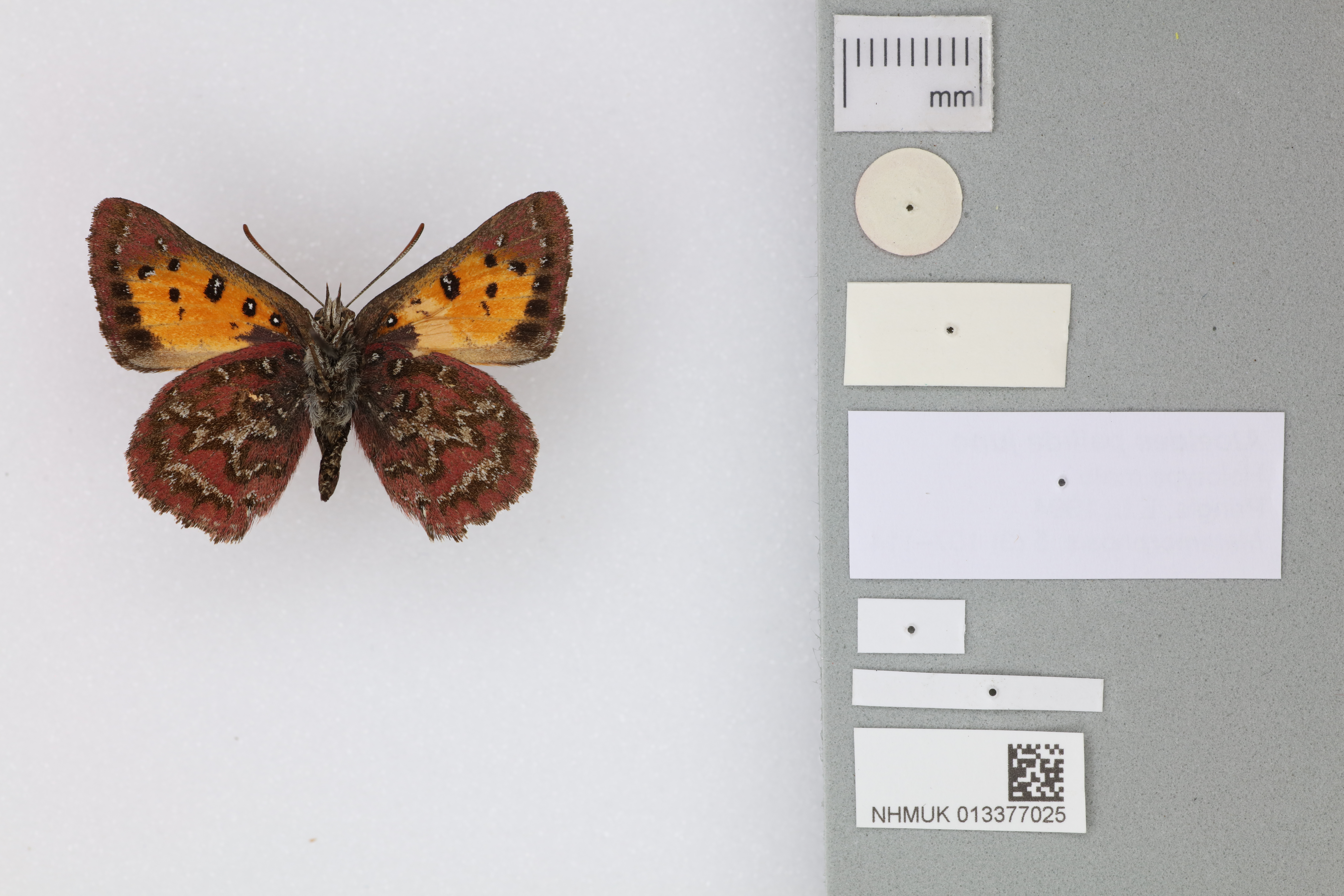

Conservation status
- Least Concern (IUCN 3.1)

Scientific classification
- Kingdom: Animalia
- Phylum: Arthropoda
- Class: Insecta
- Order: Lepidoptera
- Family: Lycaenidae
- Genus: Aloeides
- Species: A. pallida

Binomial name
- Aloeides pallida Tite & Dickson, 1968

Synonyms
- Phasis thyra f. pallida Riley, 1938

= Aloeides pallida =

Giant copper

Species of butterfly

Aloeides pallida, the giant copper, is a butterfly of the family Lycaenidae. It is found in South Africa

== Description ==
The wingspan is 30–39 mm for males and 34–45 mm females. Adults are on wing from October to early January or as early as August for the nominate subspecies. There is one generation per year.

== Habitat and behavior ==
The butterflies of this group inhabit grassy areas with bare patches, such as grassy fynbos in the western and eastern cape, or highvield grasslands in other provinces.

Aloeidis males exhibit territorial behavior, claiming specific areas on road verges and unsurfaced roads where they can counter females and mate.

== Life cycle ==
The species is holometabolous. Oviposition takes place in favorable weather conditions around mid December. The eggs are relatively large for a lycaenid butterfly, and are spherical in shape and pale in color.

The species follows a mutualistic relationship with the ant species Lepisiota capensis, as the female only oviposits its eggs at the entrance of the nest of its colony. These ants are found nesting in the soil at the base of grass Eragrostis curvula.

After a duration of 15 days, the eggs hatch and newly emerged larvae are highly active, which enables them to crawl inside the ants' nest. They are nearly 2mm long and are colored to camouflage them on the soil featuring epidermal setae in the first instar. The myrmecophily among ants and larvae allows further developmental progress, as they fail to survive beyond the first or second instar without the presence of ants. Until pupal stage, the larve are aphytophagous and only consume eggs of the ants. This association is obligate dependence.

Unlike other species of Aloeides genus, these butterflies do not have a preference for host Aspalathus plants.

== Subspecies ==
- A. p. pallida (Western Cape to Eastern Cape and north to the Free State)
- A. p. grandis Tite & Dickson, 1968 (mountains above Paarl and Franschhoek north to Gydo Mountain and east to Garcia's Pass)
- A. p. littoralis Tite & Dickson, 1968 (coastal fynbos from Hermanus to Knysna in the Western Cape)
- A. p. jonathani Pringle, 1987 (montane fynbos in the Kammanassie Mountains in the Western Cape)
- A. p. juno Pringle, 1994 (fynbos in the Eastern Cape)
- A. p. liversidgei Pringle, 1994 (Baviaanskloof Mountains in the Eastern Cape)
