= Aloeides barbarae =

Conservation status
- Endangered (IUCN 3.1)

Scientific classification
- Kingdom: Animalia
- Phylum: Arthropoda
- Class: Insecta
- Order: Lepidoptera
- Family: Lycaenidae
- Genus: Aloeides
- Species: A. barbarae

Binomial name
- Aloeides barbarae Henning & Henning, 1994

Species of butterfly

Aloeides barbarae, the Barbara's copper, is a butterfly of the family Lycaenidae. It is found in South Africa, where it is only known from montane grassland on one hill top between Fairview and the Sheba Mines in Mpumalanga.

The wingspan is 22–24 mm for males and 24–26 mm for females. Adults are on wing from October to November. There is one generation per year.
