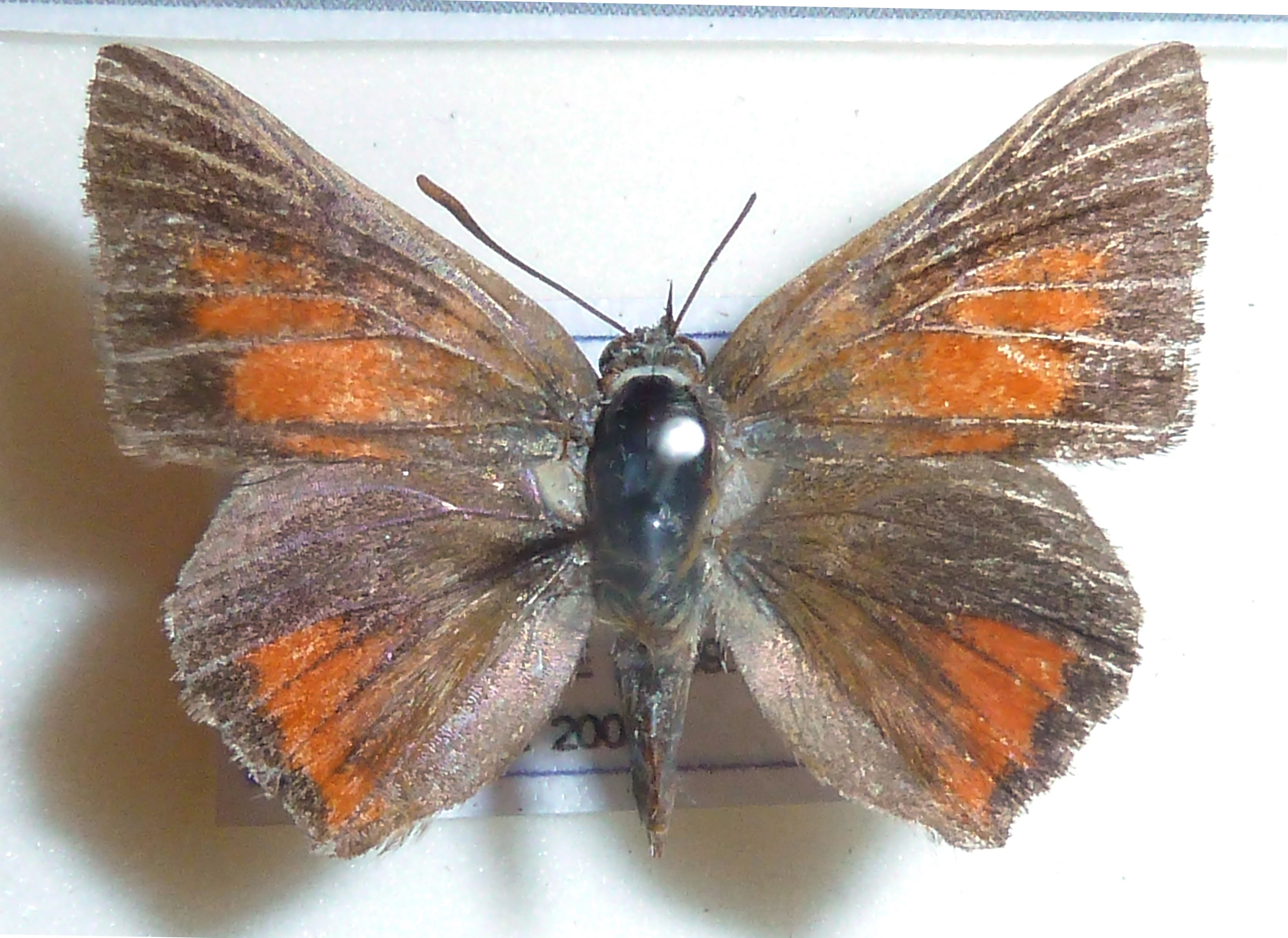

Scientific classification
- Kingdom: Animalia
- Phylum: Arthropoda
- Class: Insecta
- Order: Lepidoptera
- Family: Lycaenidae
- Genus: Aloeides
- Species: A. thyra

Binomial name
- Aloeides thyra (Linnaeus, 1764)

Synonyms
- Papilio thyra Linnaeus, 1764; Papilio nycetus Stoll, 1781; Papilio euadrus Fabricius, 1787

= Aloeides thyra =

Red copper

Species of butterfly

Aloeides thyra, the red copper, is a butterfly of the family Lycaenidae. It is found in the Western Cape, South Africa.

The wingspan is 22–26 mm for males and 24–28 mm females. Adults are on wing from July to April with peaks in October and February. There are several generations per year through the warmer months.

The larvae feed on Aspalathus acuminata, A. laricifolia and A. cymbiformis. The larvae are attended to by Lepisiota capensis ants.

== Subspecies ==
- Aloeides thyra thyra (Cape Peninsula, north-west to Lambert's Bay and east to Matjiesfontein)
- Aloeides thyra orientis Pringle, 1994 (Stilbaai to Knysna in the Western Cape)
