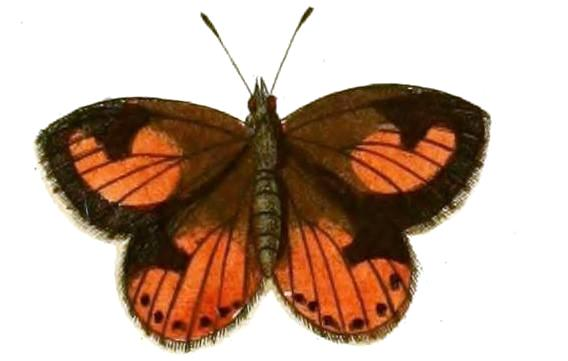

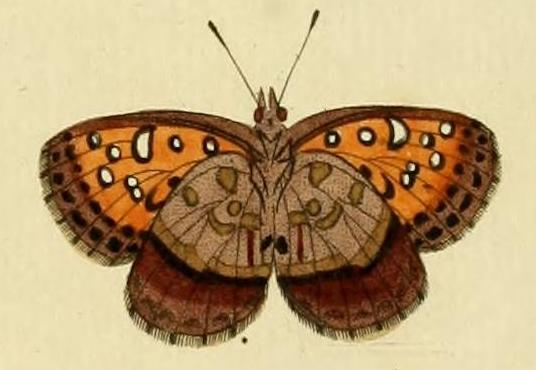

Conservation status
- Least Concern (IUCN 3.1)

Scientific classification
- Kingdom: Animalia
- Phylum: Arthropoda
- Clade: Pancrustacea
- Class: Insecta
- Order: Lepidoptera
- Family: Lycaenidae
- Genus: Aloeides
- Species: A. pierus

Binomial name
- Aloeides pierus (Cramer, [1779])

Synonyms
- Papilio pierus Cramer, [1779]; Papilio euadrus Fabricius, 1787; Papilio suetonius Fabricius, 1793

= Aloeides pierus =

Species of butterfly

Aloeides pierus, the dull copper, is a butterfly of the family Lycaenidae. It is found in South Africa, where it is found in the Western, Northern and Eastern Cape, as well as the Free State.

== Description ==
This butterfly species inhabits grassy areas with bare patches, such as grassy fynbos in the western and eastern cape, or highvield grasslands in other provinces.

The wingspan is 25–30 mm (0.98–1.18 in). Adults are on wing from September to April, with peaks in October and February. There are multiple generations per year. There are 12 veins on forewing, while hindwing lacks tail.

The males of Aloeidis exhibit territorial behavior, claiming specific areas on road verges and unsurfaced roads where they can counter females and mate.

Chinitinous spicules are present at the distal end of tibia in a f-f-a configuration, with a well-developed spur at the lower extremities. Males have a sharp foretarsal claw. A. pierus feature long palpi, a robust thorax, and a mesofur almost twice the length of tibia. Females lack dense tuft of specialized scales on their abdomen.

The genitalia are very similar among species of this genus, and not very useful when distinguishing. The uncus is in the form of a narrow strip, overlaying the large tegumen, with its distal edge slightly convex when flattened, while the subunci are short and exhibit bulging at their bases. The tegumen extends proximally to the eighth abdominal segment. There adeagus is short with slight dorsal swelling, curving slightly downwards. It features some lateral fine spines on its external region. There are oblong valves containing broad, rounded finger-like apices. The juxta is triangular, notched medially and the saccus is small and rounded.

== Habitat and behavior ==
The Dorsal Nectary Organ (DNO) develops in larvae later stages, mostly the third and subsequent instars.

The larvae feed on Aspalathus species. They shelter in the nests of Lepisiota capensis ants during the day.
