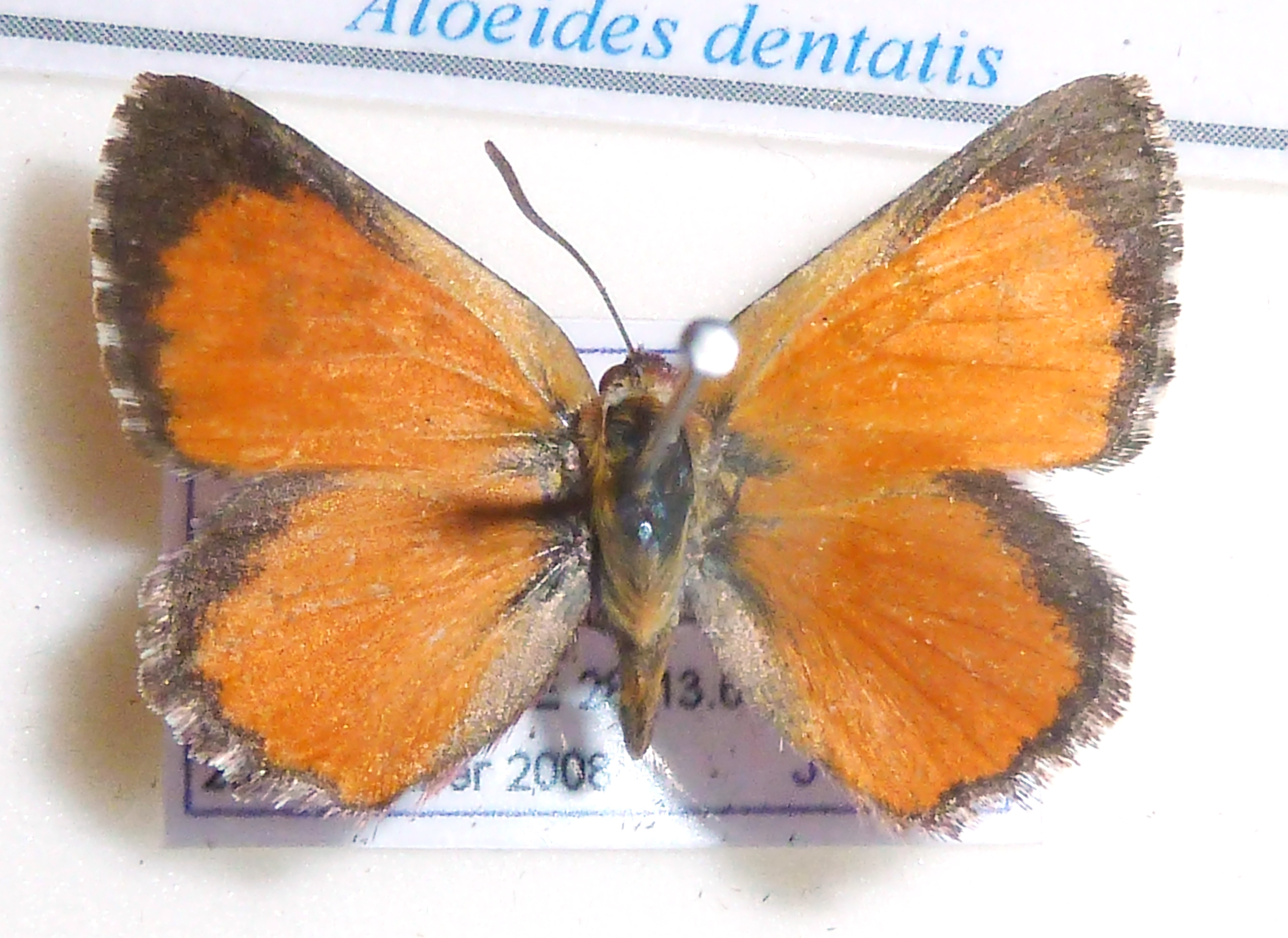

Conservation status
- Least Concern (IUCN 3.1)

Scientific classification
- Kingdom: Animalia
- Phylum: Arthropoda
- Class: Insecta
- Order: Lepidoptera
- Family: Lycaenidae
- Genus: Aloeides
- Species: A. dentatis

Binomial name
- Aloeides dentatis (Swierstra, 1909)

Synonyms
- Phasis dentatis Swierstra, 1909; Phasis thyra maseruna Riley, 1938

= Aloeides dentatis =

Roodepoort copper

Species of butterfly

Aloeides dentatis, the Roodepoort copper, is a species of butterfly in the family Lycaenidae. It is found in Lesotho and South Africa.

== Description ==
This butterfly inhabits grassy areas with bare patches, such as grassy fynbos in the western and eastern cape, or highvield grasslands in other provinces.

The wingspan is 22–26 mm for males and 24–28 mm females. Adults are on wing from August to November and from February to March. There are two generations per year. There is a submarginal silvery band on the underside of hindwing, extending from costa to the inner margin.

The males of Aloeidis exhibit territorial behavior, claiming specific areas on road verges and unsurfaced roads where they can counter females and mate.

== Habitat and behavior ==
The larvae of the nominate subspecies feed on Hermannia depressa and Lotononis eriantha. Larvae of subspecies A. d. maseruna feed on Hermannia jacobeifolia. The larvae are attended to by Lepisiota capensis ants.

A. dentatis are noted to secrete chemicals from their perforated cupolas, that mimic the brood pheromones of the host ants, allowing them blend in with the colony. To avoid being attacked, the glands near tubercles produce a second secretion that mimics the 'alarm pheromones' of these ants.

- Aloeides dentatis dentatis (South Africa: Mpumalanga, Gauteng, KwaZulu-Natal)
- Aloeides dentatis maseruna (Riley, 1938) (Lesotho, South Africa: North West and Free State)
