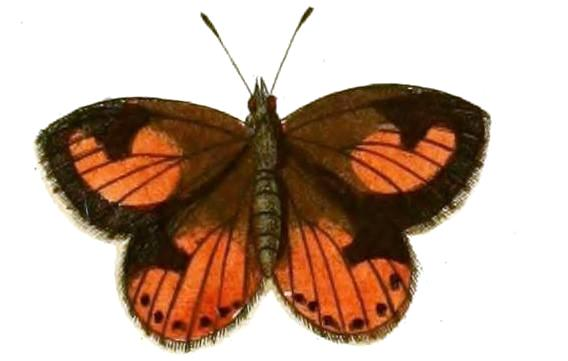
- A. pierus

Scientific classification
- Kingdom: Animalia
- Phylum: Arthropoda
- Class: Insecta
- Order: Lepidoptera
- Family: Lycaenidae
- Subfamily: Aphnaeinae
- Genus: Aloeides; Hübner, [1819]

= Aloeides =

Butterfly genus in family Lycaenidae

Aloeides, commonly called coppers, is a genus of butterflies in the family Lycaenidae. Most can be found in South Africa (49 species), but a few species occur as far north as Kenya (8 species).

== General Description ==
The butterflies of this genus inhabit grassy areas with bare patches, such as grassy fynbos in the western and eastern cape, or highvield grasslands in other provinces.

Aloeidis males exhibit territorial behavior, claiming specific areas on road verges and unsurfaced roads where they can counter females and mate.

These butterflies of this genus are observed to have a preference for host Apalathus plants, except Aloeides pallida.

Aloeides butterflies are polyphagous, recorded to have been feeding on six plant species from four families. Ant species Monomorium fridae and Lepisiota capensis act as larval hosts, in an obligate dependence association.

== Species ==
Listed alphabetically within groups.

- The "thyra" species group:
  - Aloeides apicalis Tite & Dickson, 1968 – pointed copper
  - Aloeides arida Tite & Dickson, 1968 – arid copper
  - Aloeides bamptoni Tite & Dickson, 1977 – Brampton's copper
  - Aloeides braueri Tite & Dickson, 1968 – Brauer's copper
  - Aloeides caledoni Tite & Dickson, 1973 – Caledon copper
  - Aloeides clarki Tite & Dickson, 1968 – Coega copper
  - Aloeides dentatis (Swierstra, 1909) – Roodepoort copper
  - Aloeides depicta Tite & Dickson, 1968 – depicta copper
  - Aloeides dryas Tite & Dickson, 1968 – Transvaal copper
  - Aloeides egerides Tite & Dickson, 1968 – Red Hill copper
  - Aloeides gowani Tite & Dickson, 1968 – Gowan's copper
  - Aloeides juana Tite & Dickson, 1968 – Juana copper
  - Aloeides kaplani Tite & Dickson, 1977 – Kaplan's copper
  - Aloeides lutescens Tite & Dickson, 1968 – Worcester copper
  - Aloeides margaretae Tite & Dickson, 1968 – Marguarite's copper
  - Aloeides nollothi Tite & Dickson, 1977 – Nolloth's copper
  - Aloeides oreas Tite & Dickson, 1968 – Oreas copper
  - Aloeides pallida Tite & Dickson, 1968 – giant copper
  - Aloeides penningtoni Tite & Dickson, 1968 – Pennington's copper
  - Aloeides pringlei Tite & Dickson, 1976 – Pringle's copper
  - Aloeides quickelbergei Tite & Dickson, 1968 – Quickelberge's copper
  - Aloeides rileyi Tite & Dickson, 1976 – Riley's copper
  - Aloeides simplex (Trimen, 1893) – dune copper
  - Aloeides thyra (Linnaeus, 1764) – red copper
  - Aloeides vansoni Tite & Dickson, 1968 – Van Son's copper
- unnamed species group A:
  - Aloeides almeida (C. Felder, 1862) – Almeida copper
  - Aloeides aranda (Wallengren, 1857) – Aranda copper
  - Aloeides barklyi (Trimen, 1874) – Barkly's copper
  - Aloeides conradsi (Aurivillius, 1907) – Conrad's copper
  - Aloeides damarensis (Trimen, 1891) – Damara copper
  - Aloeides griseus Riley, 1921
  - Aloeides henningi Tite & Dickson, 1973 – Henning's copper
  - Aloeides macmasteri Tite & Dickson, 1973 – McMaster's copper
  - Aloeides molomo (Trimen, 1870) – molomo copper
  - Aloeides pierus (Cramer, [1779]) – dull copper
  - Aloeides plowesi Tite & Dickson, 1973 – Plowes' copper
  - Aloeides stevensoni Tite & Dickson, 1973 – Stevenson's copper
  - Aloeides susanae Tite & Dickson, 1973 – Susan's copper
  - Aloeides swanepoeli Tite & Dickson, 1973 – Swanepoel's copper
  - Aloeides taikosama (Wallengren, 1857) – dusky copper
  - Aloeides trimeni Tite & Dickson, 1973 – Trimen's copper
- unnamed species group B:
  - Aloeides angolensis Tite & Dickson, 1973
  - Aloeides argenteus Henning & Henning, 1994 – silvery copper
  - Aloeides barbarae Henning & Henning, 1994 – Barbara's copper
  - Aloeides caffrariae Henning, 1987 – border copper
  - Aloeides carolynnae Dickson, 1983 – Carolynn's copper
  - Aloeides dicksoni Henning, 1987 – Dickson's copper
  - Aloeides maluti Pringle, 1983 – Maluti copper
  - Aloeides mbuluensis Pringle, 1994 – Mbulu copper
  - Aloeides merces Henning & Henning, 1986 – Wakkerstroom copper
  - Aloeides monticola Pringle, 1994 – Cederberg copper
  - Aloeides mullini Henning & Henning, 1996 – Mullin's copper
  - Aloeides namibiensis Henning & Henning, 1994 – Namibia copper
  - Aloeides nubilus Henning & Henning, 1982 – cloud copper
  - Aloeides rossouwi Henning & Henning, 1982 – Rossouw's copper
  - Aloeides tearei Henning & Henning, 1982 – Teare's copper
  - Aloeides titei Henning, 1987 – Tite's copper
