= Aloeides juana =

Juana copper

Conservation status
- Least Concern (IUCN 3.1)

Scientific classification
- Kingdom: Animalia
- Phylum: Arthropoda
- Class: Insecta
- Order: Lepidoptera
- Family: Lycaenidae
- Genus: Aloeides
- Species: A. juana

Binomial name
- Aloeides juana Tite & Dickson, 1968

Synonyms
- Aloeides vansoni juana Tite & Dickson, 1968

Species of butterfly

Aloeides juana, the Juana copper, is a butterfly of the family Lycaenidae. It is found in South Africa, where it is known from the Western Cape to Namaqualand and the Steinkopf area in the Northern Cape.

The wingspan is 29–34 mm for males and 30–38 mm females. Adults are on wing from September to December and from February to April. There are two generations per year.
