= Aloeides griseus =

Scientific classification
- Domain: Eukaryota
- Kingdom: Animalia
- Phylum: Arthropoda
- Class: Insecta
- Order: Lepidoptera
- Family: Lycaenidae
- Genus: Aloeides
- Species: A. griseus

Binomial name
- Aloeides griseus Riley, 1921

Species of butterfly

Aloeides griseus is a butterfly in the family Lycaenidae. It is found in Zambia.
