= Aloeides pringlei =

Pringle's copper

Conservation status
- Least Concern (IUCN 3.1)

Scientific classification
- Kingdom: Animalia
- Phylum: Arthropoda
- Class: Insecta
- Order: Lepidoptera
- Family: Lycaenidae
- Genus: Aloeides
- Species: A. pringlei

Binomial name
- Aloeides pringlei Tite & Dickson, 1976

Species of butterfly

Aloeides pringlei, the Pringle's copper, is a species of butterfly in the family Lycaenidae. It is endemic to South Africa, where it is only found in a few localities in grassland of the Eastern Cape near the Great Winterberg.

The wingspan is 30–34 mm (1.2–1.3 in) for males and 32–36 mm (1.3–1.4 in) females. Adults are on wing from November to December. There is one generation per year.
