= Aloeides susanae =

Conservation status
- Least Concern (IUCN 3.1)

Scientific classification
- Kingdom: Animalia
- Phylum: Arthropoda
- Class: Insecta
- Order: Lepidoptera
- Family: Lycaenidae
- Genus: Aloeides
- Species: A. susanae

Binomial name
- Aloeides susanae Tite & Dickson, 1973

Species of butterfly

Aloeides susanae, commonly known as the Susan's copper, is a species of butterfly in the family Lycaenidae. It is found in South Africa, where it is found from the KwaZulu-Natal midlands to the Free State and the Eastern Cape.

The wingspan is 21–24 mm for males and 22–26 mm females. Adults are on wing from September to January. There is one, or possibly two, generations per year.
