= Aloeides rileyi =

Riley's copper

Conservation status
- Least Concern (IUCN 3.1)

Scientific classification
- Kingdom: Animalia
- Phylum: Arthropoda
- Class: Insecta
- Order: Lepidoptera
- Family: Lycaenidae
- Genus: Aloeides
- Species: A. rileyi

Binomial name
- Aloeides rileyi Tite & Dickson, 1976

Synonyms
- Aloeides taylori Tite and Dickson, 1976; Aloeides rileyi f. pallida Woodhall, 2000

Species of butterfly

Aloeides rileyi, commonly known as Riley's copper, is a butterfly of the family Lycaenidae. It is found in South Africa, where it is known from Lesotho and the eastern part of the Free State.

The wingspan is 24–28 mm (0.94–1.10 in) for males and 26–30 mm (1.0–1.2 in) females. Adults are on wing from November to February. There is one generation per year.
