= Aloeides nubilus =

Cloud copper

Conservation status
- Endangered (IUCN 3.1)

Scientific classification
- Kingdom: Animalia
- Phylum: Arthropoda
- Class: Insecta
- Order: Lepidoptera
- Family: Lycaenidae
- Genus: Aloeides
- Species: A. nubilus

Binomial name
- Aloeides nubilus Henning & Henning, 1982

Species of butterfly

Aloeides nubilus, the cloud copper, is a species of butterfly in the family Lycaenidae. It is endemic to South Africa, where it is found on low rocky ridges in the Mpumalanga Drakensberg.

The wingspan is 21–24 mm for males and 22–26 mm females. Adults are on wing from September to November. There is one generation per year.
