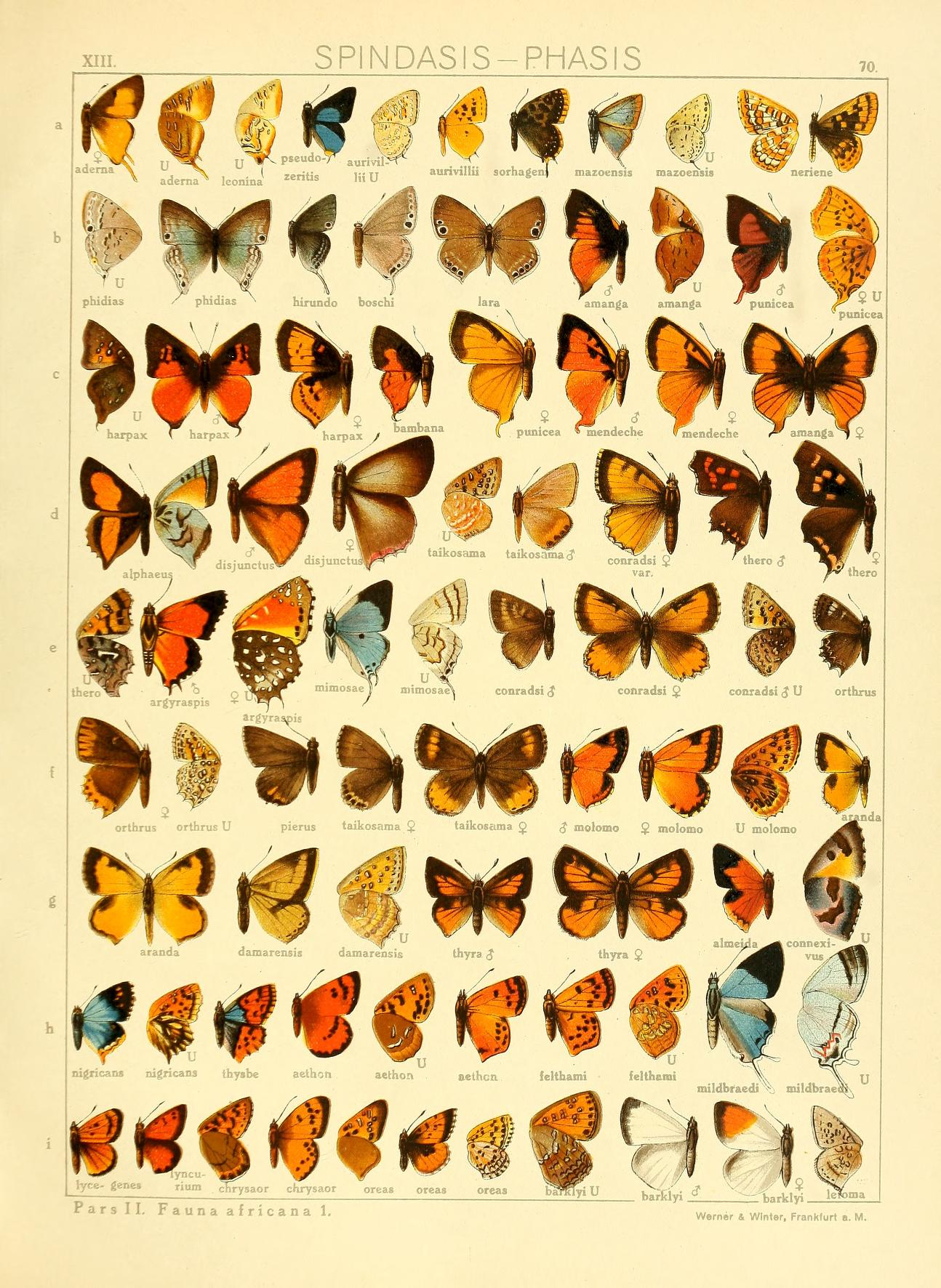

Conservation status
- Least Concern (IUCN 3.1)

Scientific classification
- Kingdom: Animalia
- Phylum: Arthropoda
- Class: Insecta
- Order: Lepidoptera
- Family: Lycaenidae
- Genus: Aloeides
- Species: A. molomo

Binomial name
- Aloeides molomo (Trimen, 1870)

Synonyms
- Zeritis molomo Trimen, 1870

= Aloeides molomo =

Molomo copper

Species of butterfly

Aloeides molomo, the molomo copper, is a butterfly of the family Lycaenidae. It is found in southern Africa.

== Description ==
This species inhabits grassy areas with bare patches, such as grassy fynbos in the western and eastern cape, or highvield grasslands in other provinces.

The wingspan is 22–33 mm (0.87–1.30 in) for males and 24–35 mm (0.94–1.38 in) for females. Adults are on wing from August to December and from March to April. There are two generations per year. A. m. krooni specimens feature silver spots on the underside of its hindwing.

== Habitat and behavior ==
The males of Aloeidis exhibit territorial behavior, claiming specific areas on road verges and unsurfaced roads where they can counter females and mate. Females have a slower flight than males.

== Life cycle ==
The female oviposits its eggs at the base of Gnidia plants.

The larvae of A. m. krooni feed on Sida ovata.

== Subspecies ==
- A. m. molomo (Eastern Cape, Free State, eastern Northern Cape, Gauteng, Mpumalanga, Limpopo, North West)
- A. m. mumbuensis Riley, 1921 (Botswana, Zambia)
- A. m. kiellandi Carcasson, 1961 (south-western Tanzania: Mpanda)
- A. m. krooni Tite & Dickson, 1973 (northern Northern Cape to Namibia and Botswana)
- A. m. coalescens Tite & Dickson, 1973 (Zimbabwe)
- A. m. handmani Tite & Dickson, 1973 (Malawi)
