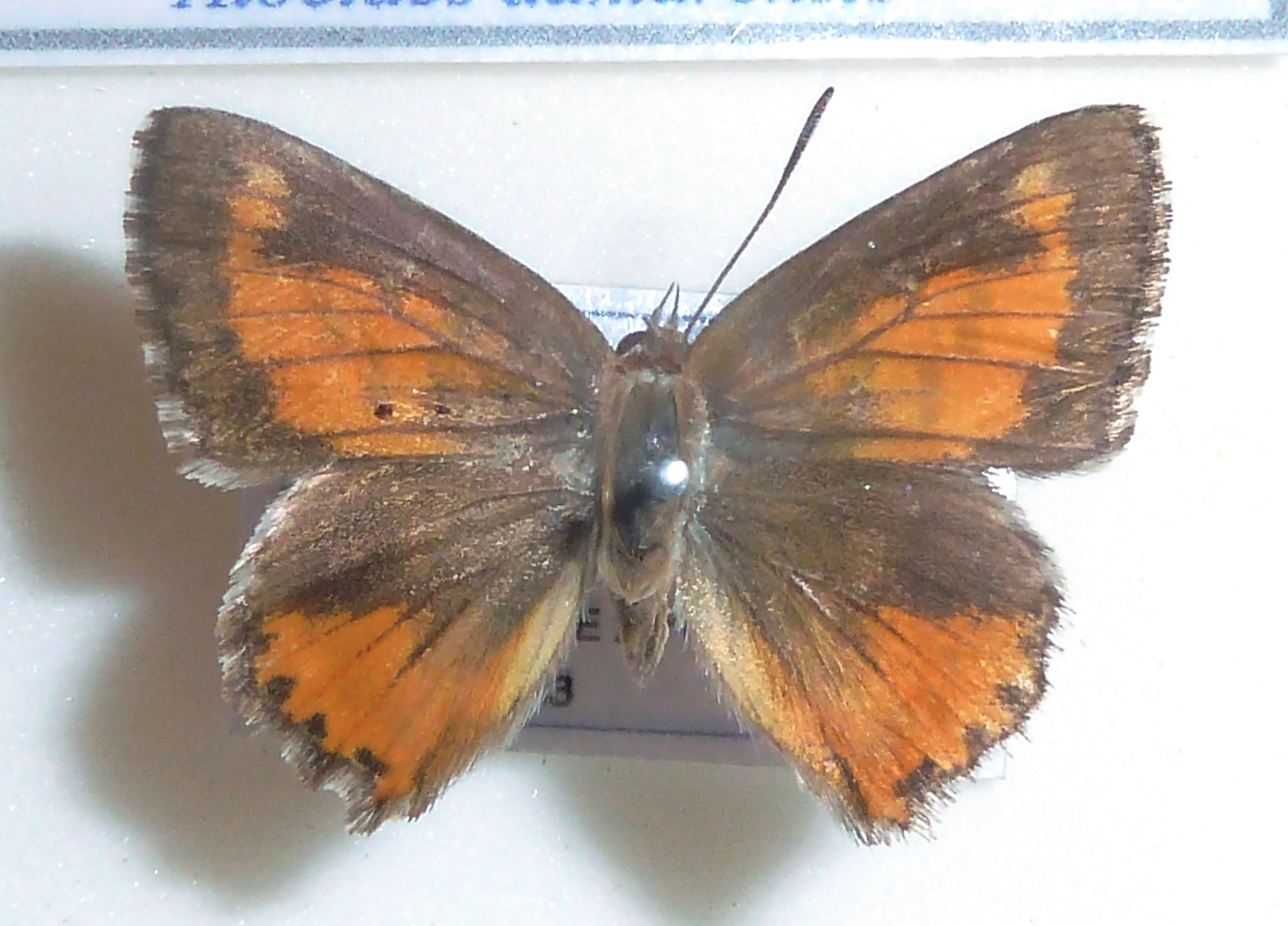

Conservation status
- Least Concern (IUCN 3.1)

Scientific classification
- Kingdom: Animalia
- Phylum: Arthropoda
- Class: Insecta
- Order: Lepidoptera
- Family: Lycaenidae
- Genus: Aloeides
- Species: A. damarensis

Binomial name
- Aloeides damarensis (Trimen, 1891)

Synonyms
- Zeritis damarensis Trimen, 1891

= Aloeides damarensis =

Damara copper

Species of butterfly

Aloeides damarensis, the Damara copper, is a butterfly of the family Lycaenidae from Southern Africa.

== Description ==
This butterfly populates grassy areas with bare patches, such as grassy fynbos in coastal KwaZulu-Natal to the Drakensberg, north into Mpumalanga and Limpopo provinces.

The wingspan is 25–32 mm for males and 28–36 mm for females. Adults are on wing from September to April in the southern part of the range and year-round in the north.

The males of Aloeidis exhibit territorial behavior, claiming specific areas on road verges and unsurfaced roads where they can counter females and mate.

A. damarensis show variable coloration and pattern, ranging from medium to light orange specimens with reduced upperside black markings.

== Habitat and Behavior ==
The female lays eggs at the base of Waltheria indica. Along with being a host plant, it also serves as a nectar source for adults. Eggs are blue in color.

The larvae feed on Aspalathus species, and are tended by Pheidole ants, that build colonies at the base of host plant.

== Subspecies ==
Dorsal and ventral side of wings

- Aloeides damarensis damarensis South Africa (Western, Northern and Eastern Cape and south-western Free State), Namibia.
- Aloeides damarensis mashona Tite & Dickson, 1973 — South Africa (northern KwaZulu-Natal to Mpumalanga, Gauteng, Limpopo and North West provinces), Zimbabwe, Botswana, Mozambique.
