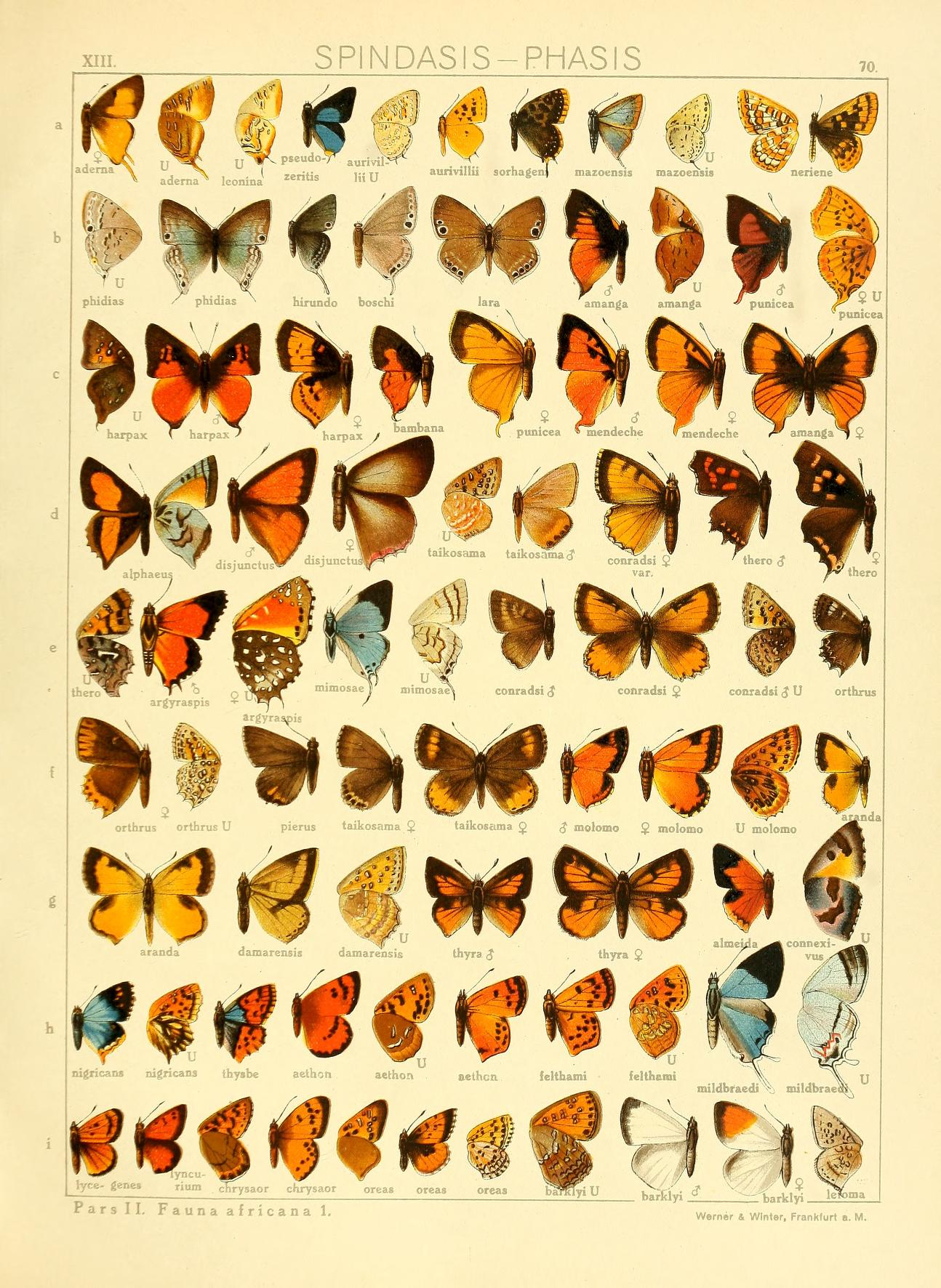

Conservation status
- Least Concern (IUCN 3.1)

Scientific classification
- Kingdom: Animalia
- Phylum: Arthropoda
- Class: Insecta
- Order: Lepidoptera
- Family: Lycaenidae
- Genus: Aloeides
- Species: A. almeida

Binomial name
- Aloeides almeida (C. Felder, 1862)

Synonyms
- Nais almeida C. Felder, 1862

= Aloeides almeida =

Species of butterfly

Aloeides almeida, the Almeida copper, is a butterfly of the family Lycaenidae. It is found in South Africa, where it is known from the Western Cape and the Cape Peninsula and the main Cape Fold Mountains, north to Ceres and east along the mountain ranges to the Eastern Cape.

The wingspan is 25–29 mm for males and 28–30 mm females. Adults are on wing from September to November and from February to April. There are two generations per year.
