= Aloeides mbuluensis =

Conservation status
- Least Concern (IUCN 3.1)

Scientific classification
- Kingdom: Animalia
- Phylum: Arthropoda
- Class: Insecta
- Order: Lepidoptera
- Family: Lycaenidae
- Genus: Aloeides
- Species: A. mbuluensis

Binomial name
- Aloeides mbuluensis Pringle, 1994

Species of butterfly

Aloeides mbuluensis, the Mbulu copper, is a butterfly of the family Lycaenidae. It is found in South Africa, where it is known from bare patches of ground in highland grassveld in the Mbulu area of the Eastern Cape and the area near Loteni in KwaZulu-Natal.

The wingspan is 26–32 mm for males and 29–37 mm females. Adults are on wing from November to January. There is one generation per year.
