= Aloeides oreas =

Conservation status
- Least Concern (IUCN 3.1)

Scientific classification
- Kingdom: Animalia
- Phylum: Arthropoda
- Class: Insecta
- Order: Lepidoptera
- Family: Lycaenidae
- Genus: Aloeides
- Species: A. oreas

Binomial name
- Aloeides oreas Tite & Dickson, 1968

Species of butterfly

Aloeides oreas, the oreas copper, is a butterfly of the family Lycaenidae. It is found in South Africa, where it is known from the Eastern Cape to the KwaZulu-Natal Drakensberg, the Free State and mountain peaks in Mpumalanga near Wakkerstroom.

The wingspan is 21–24 mm for males and 22–26 mm females. Adults are on wing from September to December, with a peak in October and from January to April, with a peak in January. There are two generations per year.
