= Aloeides stevensoni =

Conservation status
- Critically Endangered (IUCN 3.1)

Scientific classification
- Kingdom: Animalia
- Phylum: Arthropoda
- Class: Insecta
- Order: Lepidoptera
- Family: Lycaenidae
- Genus: Aloeides
- Species: A. stevensoni

Binomial name
- Aloeides stevensoni Tite & Dickson, 1973

Species of butterfly

Aloeides stevensoni, the Stevenson's copper, is a butterfly of the family Lycaenidae. It is found in South Africa, where it is restricted to montane sourveld grassland on the Wolkberg near Haenertsburg.

The wingspan is 23–26 mm for males and 24–26 mm females. Adults are on wing from November to December in one generation.
