= Aloeides namibiensis =

Scientific classification
- Domain: Eukaryota
- Kingdom: Animalia
- Phylum: Arthropoda
- Class: Insecta
- Order: Lepidoptera
- Family: Lycaenidae
- Genus: Aloeides
- Species: A. namibiensis

Binomial name
- Aloeides namibiensis Henning & Henning, 1994

Species of butterfly

Aloeides namibiensis, the Namibia copper, is a butterfly in the family Lycaenidae. It is found in Namibia. The habitat consists of arid savanna.

Adults have been recorded in December.
