= Aloeides argenteus =

Scientific classification
- Domain: Eukaryota
- Kingdom: Animalia
- Phylum: Arthropoda
- Class: Insecta
- Order: Lepidoptera
- Family: Lycaenidae
- Genus: Aloeides
- Species: A. argenteus

Binomial name
- Aloeides argenteus Henning & Henning, 1994

Species of butterfly

Aloeides argenteus, the silvery copper, is a butterfly in the family Lycaenidae. It is found in Namibia. It is only known from an arid area just inland of the coastal dunes.
