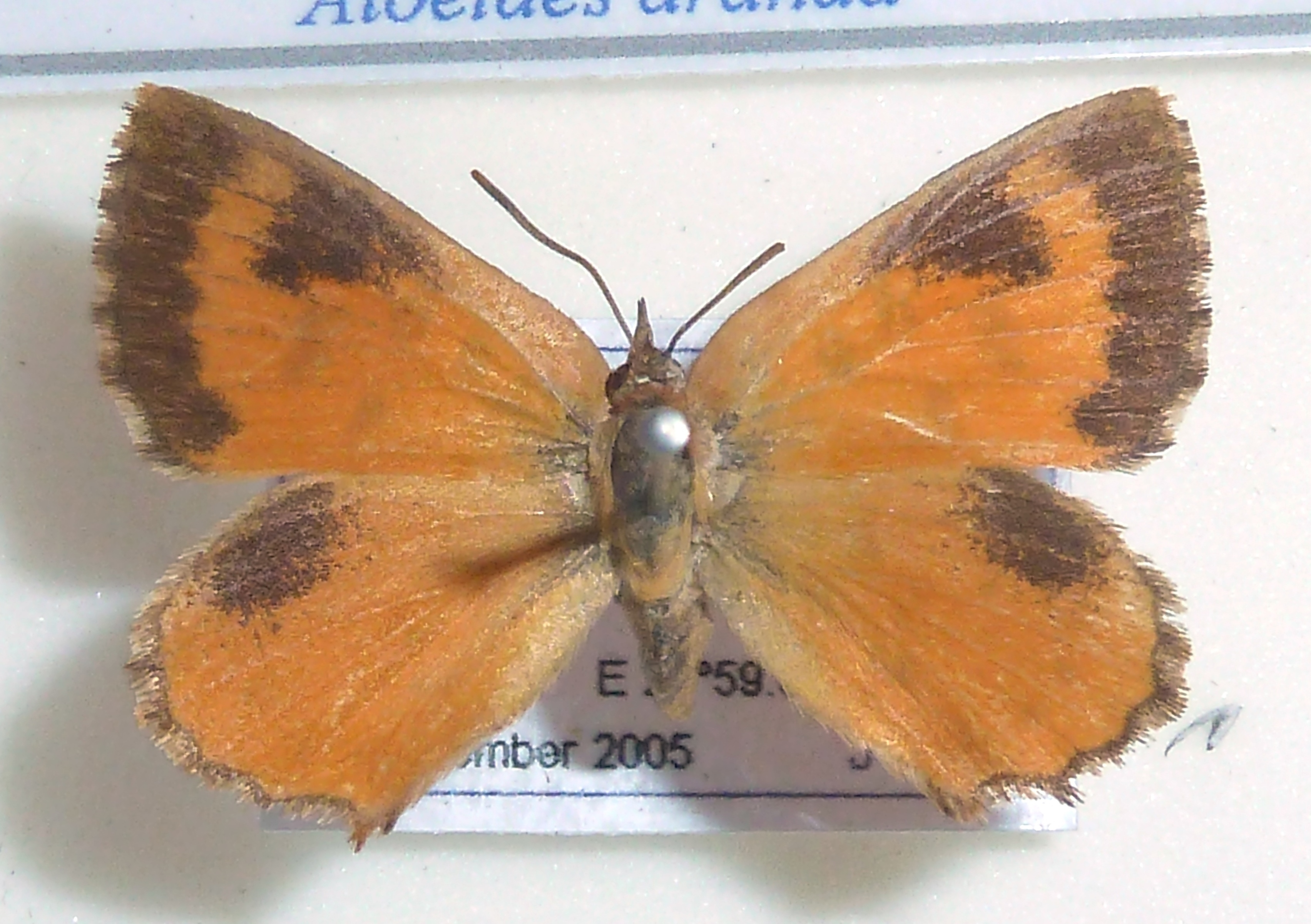

Conservation status
- Least Concern (IUCN 3.1)

Scientific classification
- Kingdom: Animalia
- Phylum: Arthropoda
- Class: Insecta
- Order: Lepidoptera
- Family: Lycaenidae
- Genus: Aloeides
- Species: A. aranda

Binomial name
- Aloeides aranda (Wallengren, 1857)

Synonyms
- Cygaritis aranda Wallengren, 1857; Zeritis mars Trimen, 1862; Aloeides zilka Grose-Smith, 1900; Zeritis rougemonti Oberthür, 1909; Phasis marshalli Aurivillius, 1923; Aloeides aranda marshalli

= Aloeides aranda =

Aranda copper

Species of butterfly

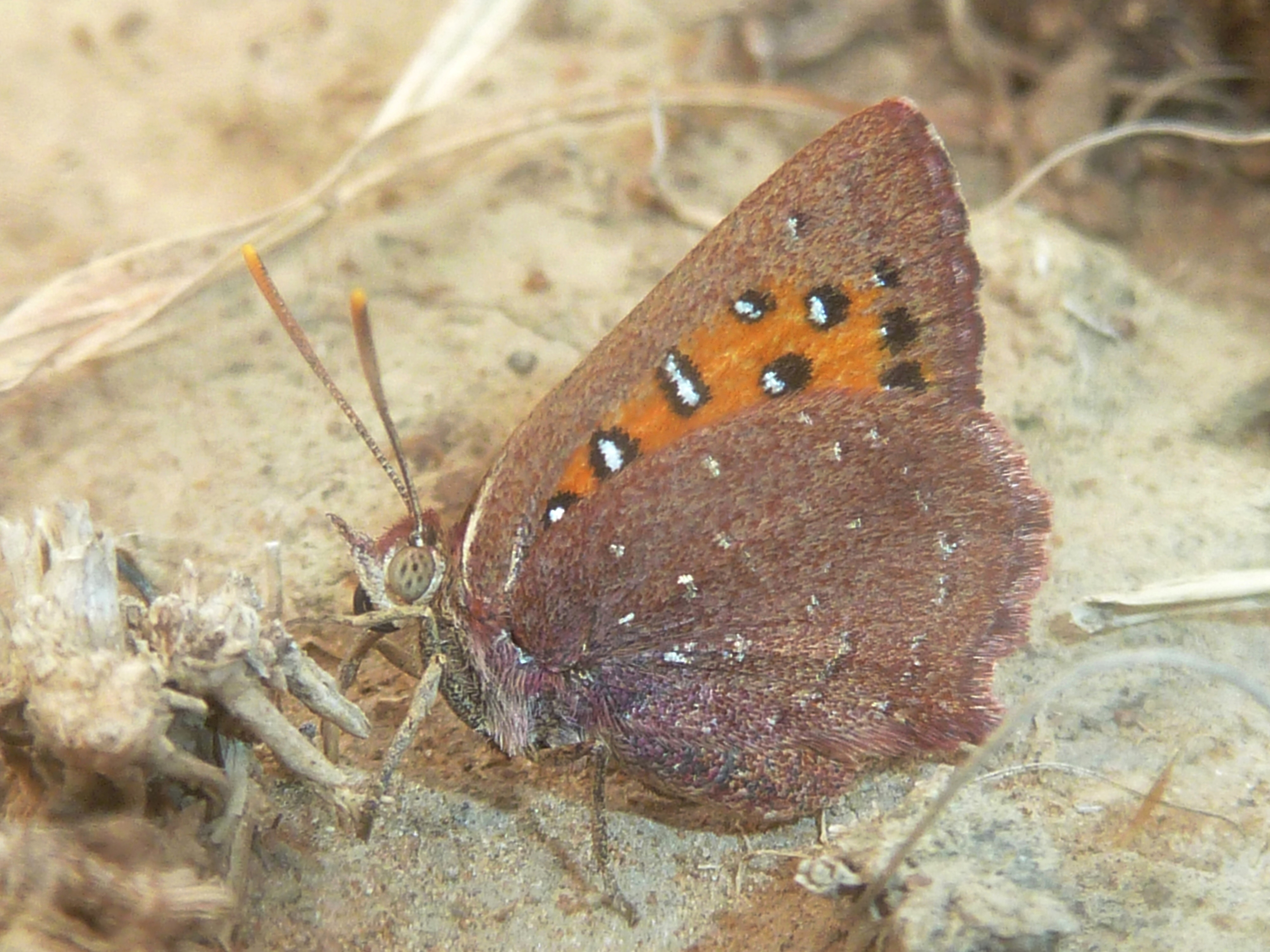
A male in highveld grassland, Free State, South Africa

Aloeides aranda, the Aranda copper, is a butterfly of the family Lycaenidae. It is found in the whole of South Africa, except in high montane forests and arid western areas. It is also found in Zimbabwe.

The wingspan is 20–29 mm (0.79–1.14 in) for males and 27–31 mm (1.1–1.2 in) females. Adults are on wing from September to April in warm areas (with peaks in October and February) and in October and February in two generations in cooler areas.

The larvae feed on Aspalathus species, a genus of legumes. They are attended to by Pheidole capensis ants.
