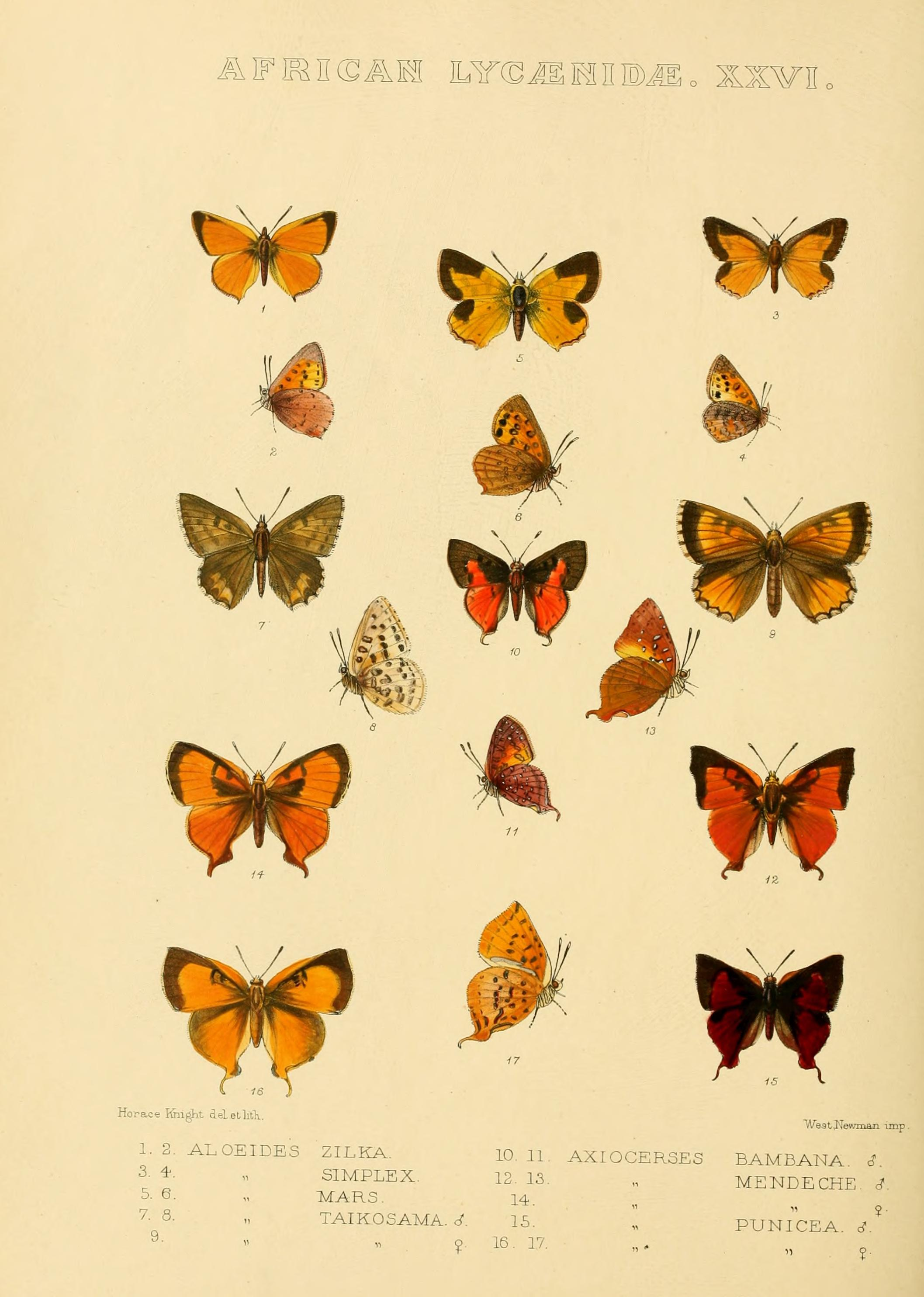
- Figures 3 and 4

Conservation status
- Least Concern (IUCN 3.1)

Scientific classification
- Kingdom: Animalia
- Phylum: Arthropoda
- Class: Insecta
- Order: Lepidoptera
- Family: Lycaenidae
- Genus: Aloeides
- Species: A. simplex

Binomial name
- Aloeides simplex (Trimen, 1893)

Synonyms
- Zeritis simplex Trimen, 1893

= Aloeides simplex =

Dune copper

Species of butterfly

Aloeides simplex, the dune copper, is a butterfly of the family Lycaenidae. It is found in South Africa, where it is known from sandy areas in the Kalahari and arid savannah, the red dunes from Kuruman, Hotazel and further west in the Northern Cape.

== Description ==
These butterflies populate flat, sandy areas near dunes, unlike other species of the genus that prefer grassy fynbos or highvield grasslands.

The wingspan is 26–32 mm for males and 29–34 mm females. Adults are on wing from August to November and from January to March. There are two generations per year.

The males of Aloeidis exhibit territorial behavior, claiming specific areas on road verges and unsurfaced roads where they can counter females and mate.

== Habitat and behavior ==
Oviposition is done at the base of host plant Melolobium microphyllum. Upon contact with ants, the female digs and covers the eggs in soil, which are noted to camouflage in, due to their resemblance with it.
