= Aloeides nollothi =

Nolloth's copper

Conservation status
- Least Concern (IUCN 3.1)

Scientific classification
- Kingdom: Animalia
- Phylum: Arthropoda
- Class: Insecta
- Order: Lepidoptera
- Family: Lycaenidae
- Genus: Aloeides
- Species: A. nollothi

Binomial name
- Aloeides nollothi Tite & Dickson, 1977

Species of butterfly

Aloeides nollothi, the Nolloth's copper, is a species of butterfly in the family Lycaenidae. It is found in Namibia and the Northern Cape province of South Africa.

== Description ==
This butterfly species inhabits grassy areas with bare patches, such as grassy fynbos in the Northern cape, or highvield grasslands in other provinces.

The wingspan is 19–22 mm for males and 20–24 mm females. Adults are on wing from August to December and in late summer (from March to April) in a possible second generation. There is usually one generation per year. The body contains a black fringe on the top of upperside.

The males of Aloeidis exhibit territorial behavior, claiming specific areas on road verges and unsurfaced roads where they can counter females and mate.
