= Aloeides tearei =

Scientific classification
- Domain: Eukaryota
- Kingdom: Animalia
- Phylum: Arthropoda
- Class: Insecta
- Order: Lepidoptera
- Family: Lycaenidae
- Genus: Aloeides
- Species: A. tearei

Binomial name
- Aloeides tearei Henning & Henning, 1982

Species of butterfly

Aloeides tearei, the Teare's copper, is a butterfly in the family Lycaenidae. It is found in southern Namibia. The habitat consists of semi desert.

Adults are on wing from August to October and in February and May.
