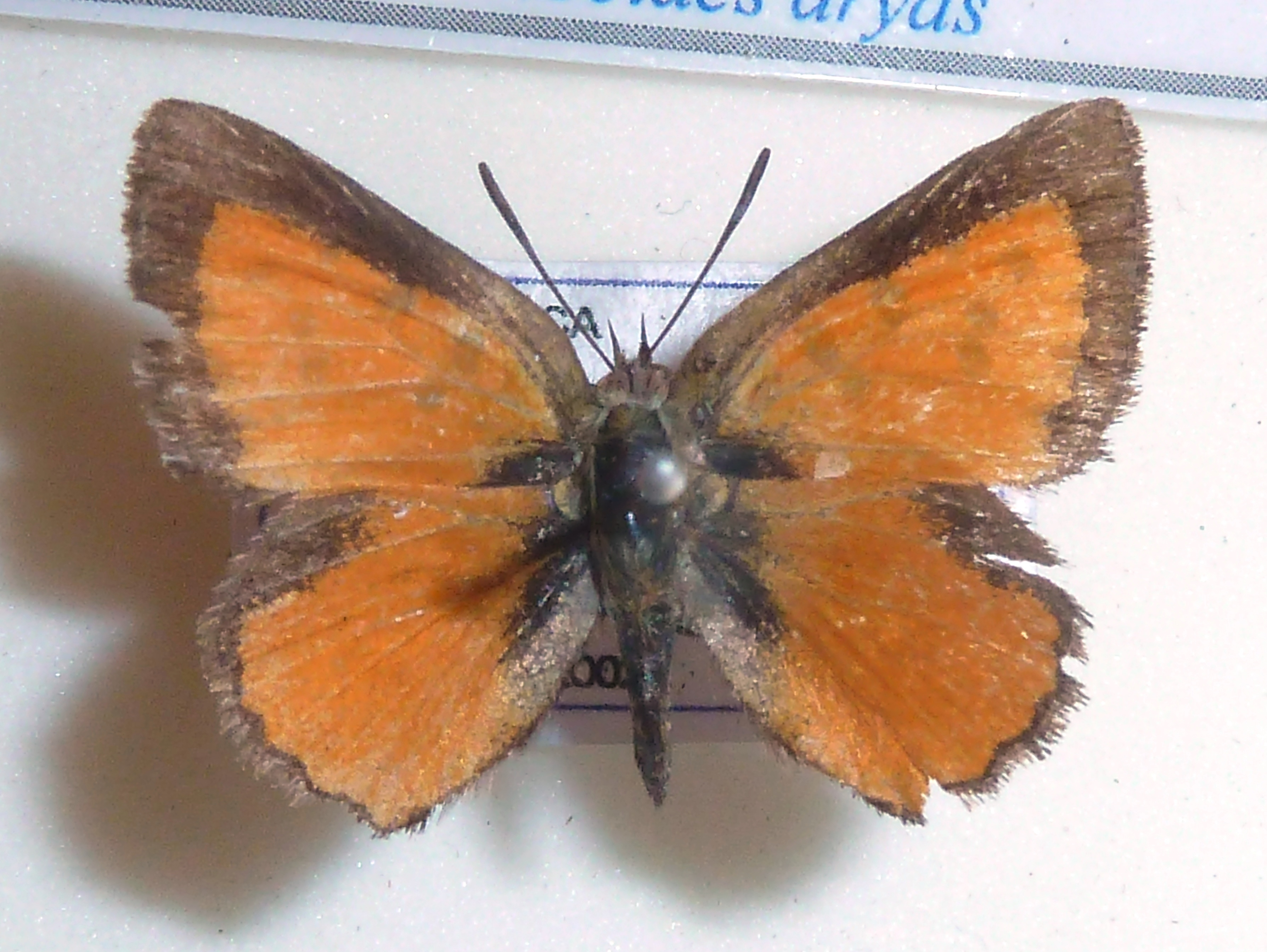

Conservation status
- Least Concern (IUCN 3.1)

Scientific classification
- Kingdom: Animalia
- Phylum: Arthropoda
- Class: Insecta
- Order: Lepidoptera
- Family: Lycaenidae
- Genus: Aloeides
- Species: A. dryas

Binomial name
- Aloeides dryas Tite & Dickson, 1968

= Aloeides dryas =

Transvaal copper

Species of butterfly

Aloeides dryas, the Transvaal copper, is a butterfly of the family Lycaenidae. It is found in southern Africa, where it is known from northern KwaZulu-Natal, Eswatini and Mpumalanga, and along the Drakensberg to the Wolkberg range in Limpopo province.

The wingspan is 26–31 mm for males and 28–34 mm females. There are several generations in the warmer months, with adults on wing from September to as late as June with peaks in November and February.

The larvae feed on Lotononis species, a genus of legumes. They are associated with ants of the genus Lepisiota.
