= Aloeides gowani =

Conservation status
- Least Concern (IUCN 3.1)

Scientific classification
- Kingdom: Animalia
- Phylum: Arthropoda
- Clade: Pancrustacea
- Class: Insecta
- Order: Lepidoptera
- Family: Lycaenidae
- Genus: Aloeides
- Species: A. gowani

Binomial name
- Aloeides gowani Tite & Dickson, 1968

Species of butterfly

Aloeides gowani, the Gowan's copper, is a butterfly of the family Lycaenidae. It is found in South Africa, where it is known from the Western, Eastern and the Northern Cape.

The wingspan is 25–29 mm for males and 28–30 mm females. Adults are on wing from October to April, with a peak from December to February There are multiple generations during midsummer.

The larvae feed on Aspalathus species.
