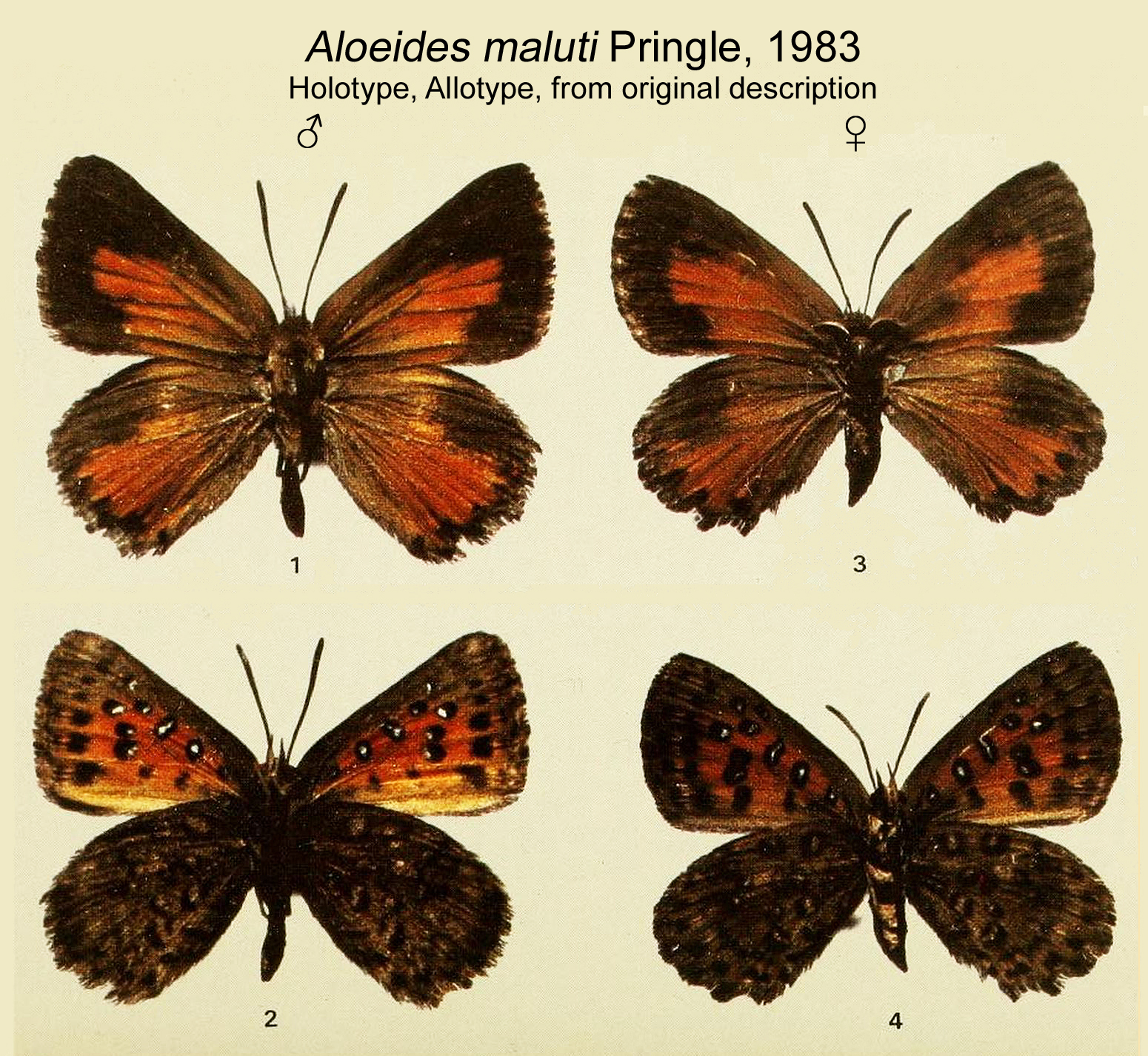

Conservation status
- Least Concern (IUCN 3.1)

Scientific classification
- Kingdom: Animalia
- Phylum: Arthropoda
- Class: Insecta
- Order: Lepidoptera
- Family: Lycaenidae
- Genus: Aloeides
- Species: A. maluti

Binomial name
- Aloeides maluti Pringle, 1983

= Aloeides maluti =

Maluti copper

Species of butterfly

Aloeides maluti, the Maluti copper, is a butterfly of the family Lycaenidae. It is mainly found in the high altitude alpine grassland of Lesotho, but also in neighbouring hills of the Free State and Eastern Cape provinces, South Africa.

The wingspan is 21–26 mm for males and 23–27 mm for females. Adults are on the wing from December to February. There is one generation per year.
