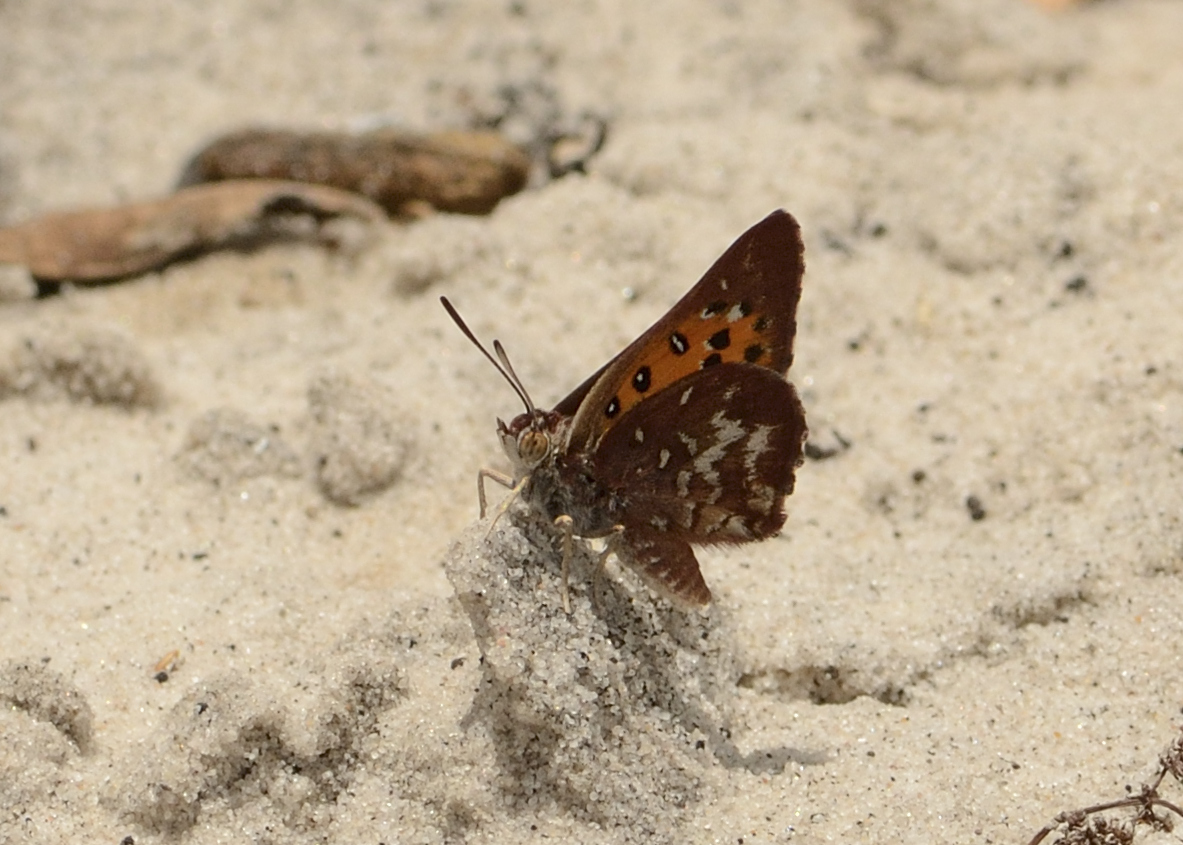

Conservation status
- Vulnerable (IUCN 3.1)

Scientific classification
- Kingdom: Animalia
- Phylum: Arthropoda
- Class: Insecta
- Order: Lepidoptera
- Family: Lycaenidae
- Genus: Aloeides
- Species: A. egerides

Binomial name
- Aloeides egerides Tite & Dickson, 1968

Synonyms
- Phasis thyra f. egrerides Riley, 1938

= Aloeides egerides =

Red Hill copper

Species of butterfly

Aloeides egerides, the Red Hill copper, is a species of butterfly in the family Lycaenidae. It is endemic to South Africa, where it is known from coastal fynbos in the Western Cape and Karwyderskraal near Hermanus on the southern coast.

The wingspan is 21–24 mm for males and 22–26 mm females. Adults are on wing from October to December, with a peak in November and from January to April, with a peak in March. There are two generations per year.
