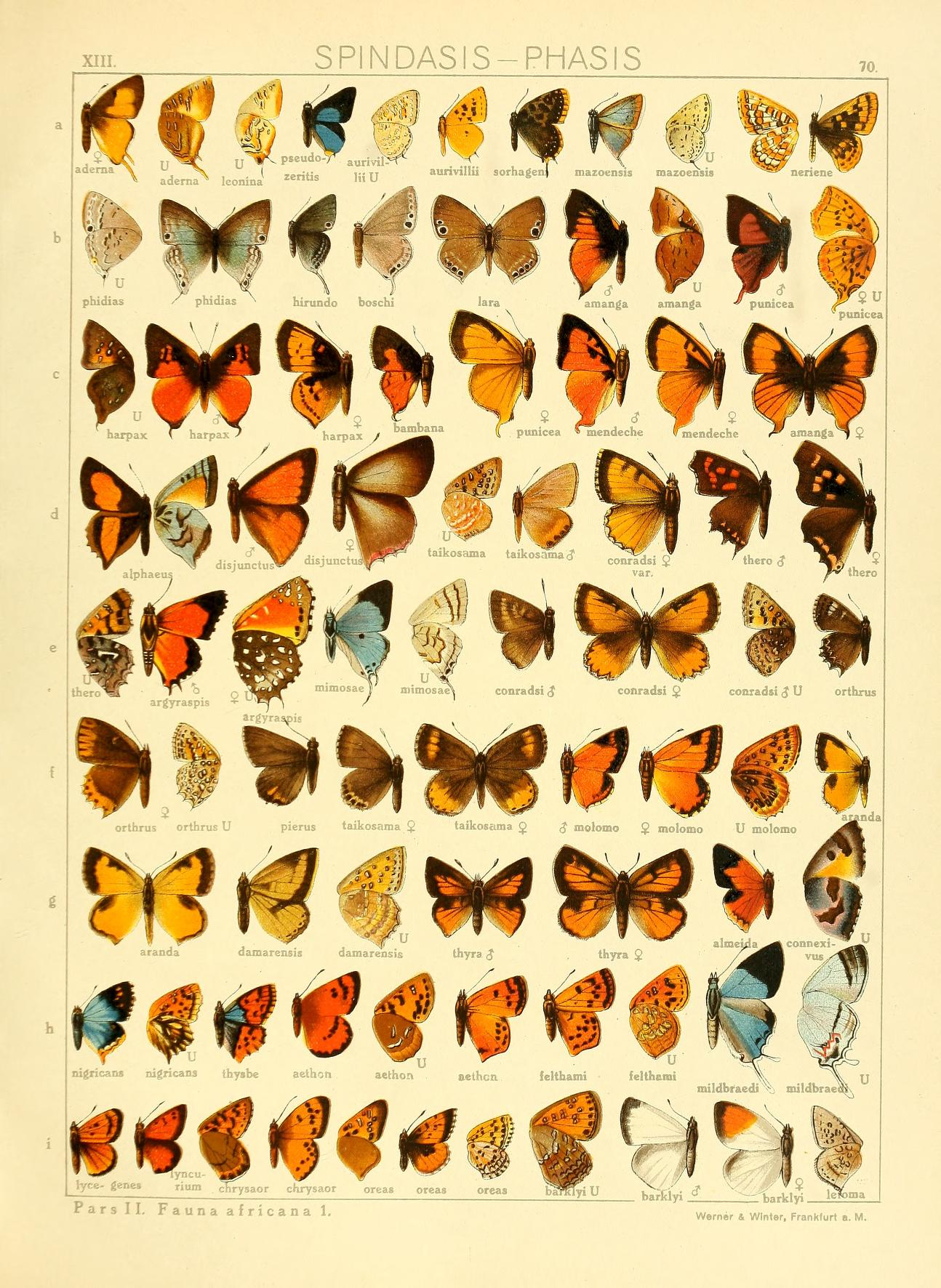

Conservation status
- Least Concern (IUCN 3.1)

Scientific classification
- Kingdom: Animalia
- Phylum: Arthropoda
- Class: Insecta
- Order: Lepidoptera
- Family: Lycaenidae
- Genus: Aloeides
- Species: A. barklyi

Binomial name
- Aloeides barklyi (Trimen, 1874)

Synonyms
- Zeritis barklyi Trimen, 1874

= Aloeides barklyi =

Barkly's copper

Species of butterfly

Aloeides barklyi, the Barkly's copper, is a butterfly of the family Lycaenidae. It is found in South Africa, where it is found in the Northern Cape, south to the Western Cape, the Cederberg and the Name Karoo at Matjiesfontein.

The wingspan is 30–34 mm for males and 32–36 mm for females. Adults are on wing from August to October and from March to May. There are two generations per year.
