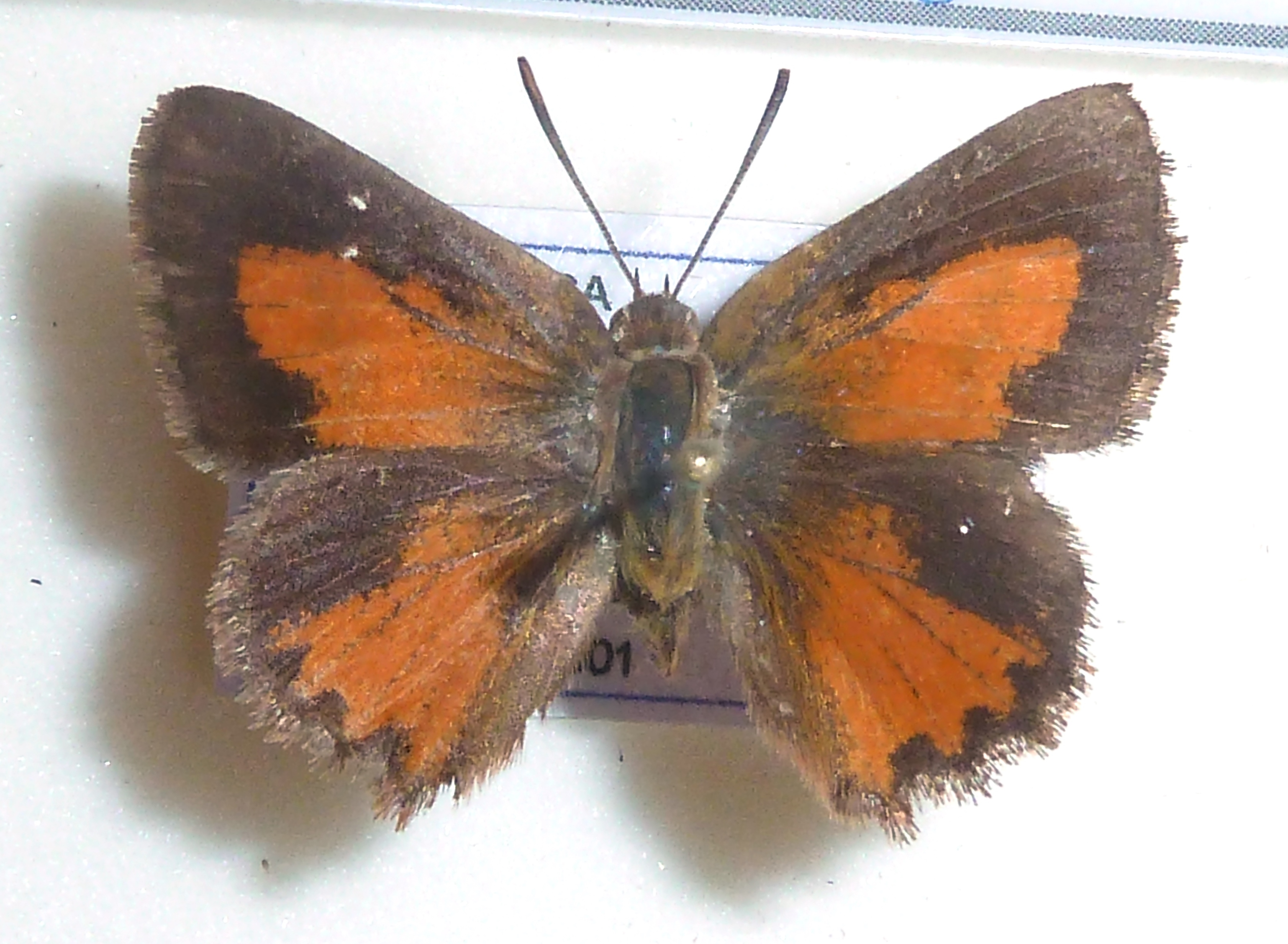

Conservation status
- Least Concern (IUCN 3.1)

Scientific classification
- Kingdom: Animalia
- Phylum: Arthropoda
- Class: Insecta
- Order: Lepidoptera
- Family: Lycaenidae
- Genus: Aloeides
- Species: A. henningi

Binomial name
- Aloeides henningi Tite & Dickson, 1973

= Aloeides henningi =

Henning's copper

Species of butterfly

Aloeides henningi, the Henning's copper, is a butterfly of the family Lycaenidae. It is found in South Africa, where it is found from the northern Eastern Cape to Lesotho, western KwaZulu-Natal, the eastern Free State, Mpumalanga, Limpopo and Gauteng.

The wingspan is 23–26 mm for males and 24–26 mm females. Adults are on the wing from September to November in one generation in cooler areas. In warm areas there is a second generation with adults on wing from January to February.
