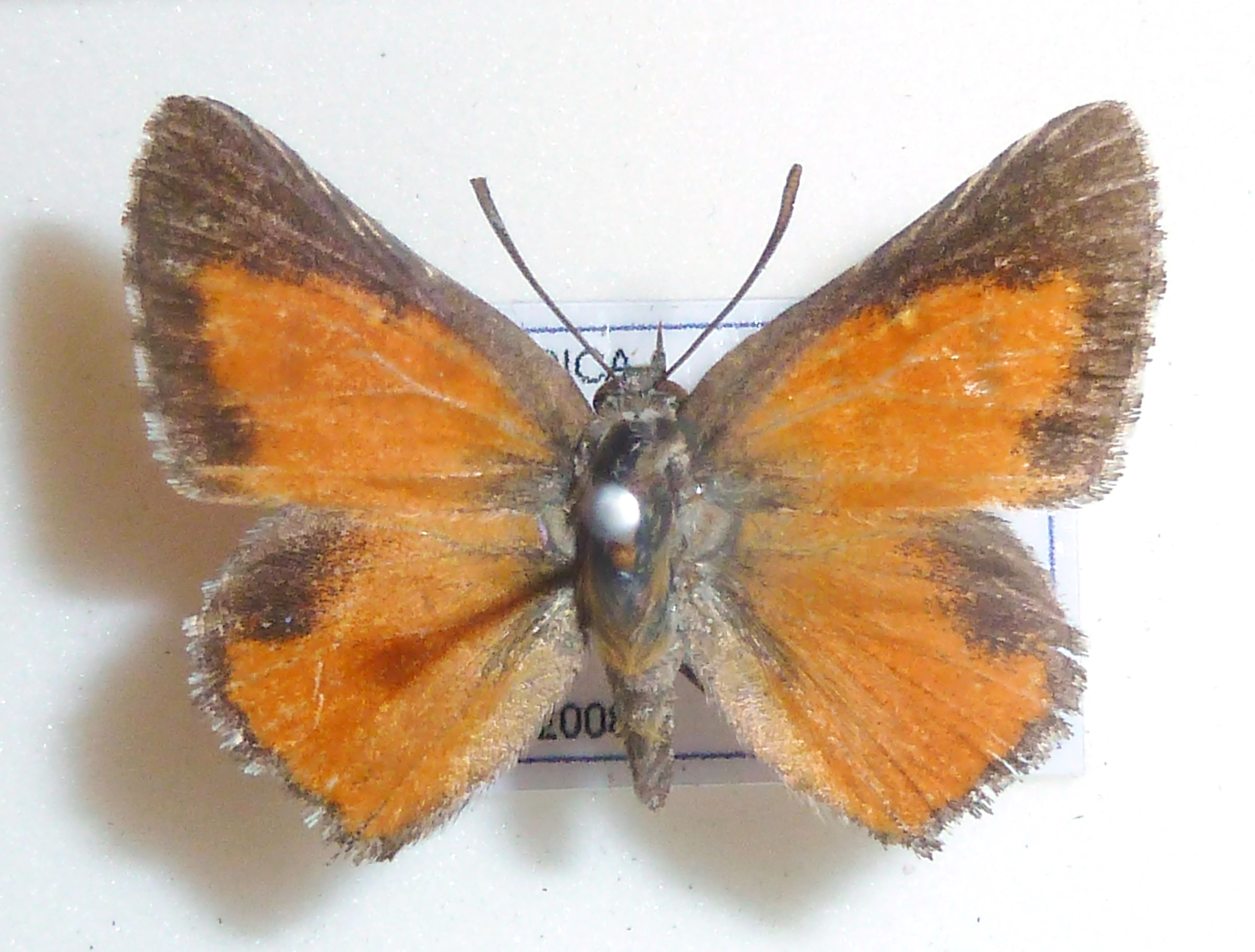
- Male

Conservation status
- Least Concern (IUCN 3.1)

Scientific classification
- Kingdom: Animalia
- Phylum: Arthropoda
- Class: Insecta
- Order: Lepidoptera
- Family: Lycaenidae
- Genus: Aloeides
- Species: A. arida

Binomial name
- Aloeides arida Tite & Dickson, 1968

= Aloeides arida =

Arid copper

Species of butterfly

Aloeides arida, the arid copper, is a butterfly of the family Lycaenidae. It is found in South Africa, where it is known from the northern Western Cape to Springbok and Steinkopf in the Northern Cape.

The wingspan is 26–32 mm for males and 29–35 mm females. Adults are on wing from September to April, with a peak from December to February. There are multiple generations during midsummer.
