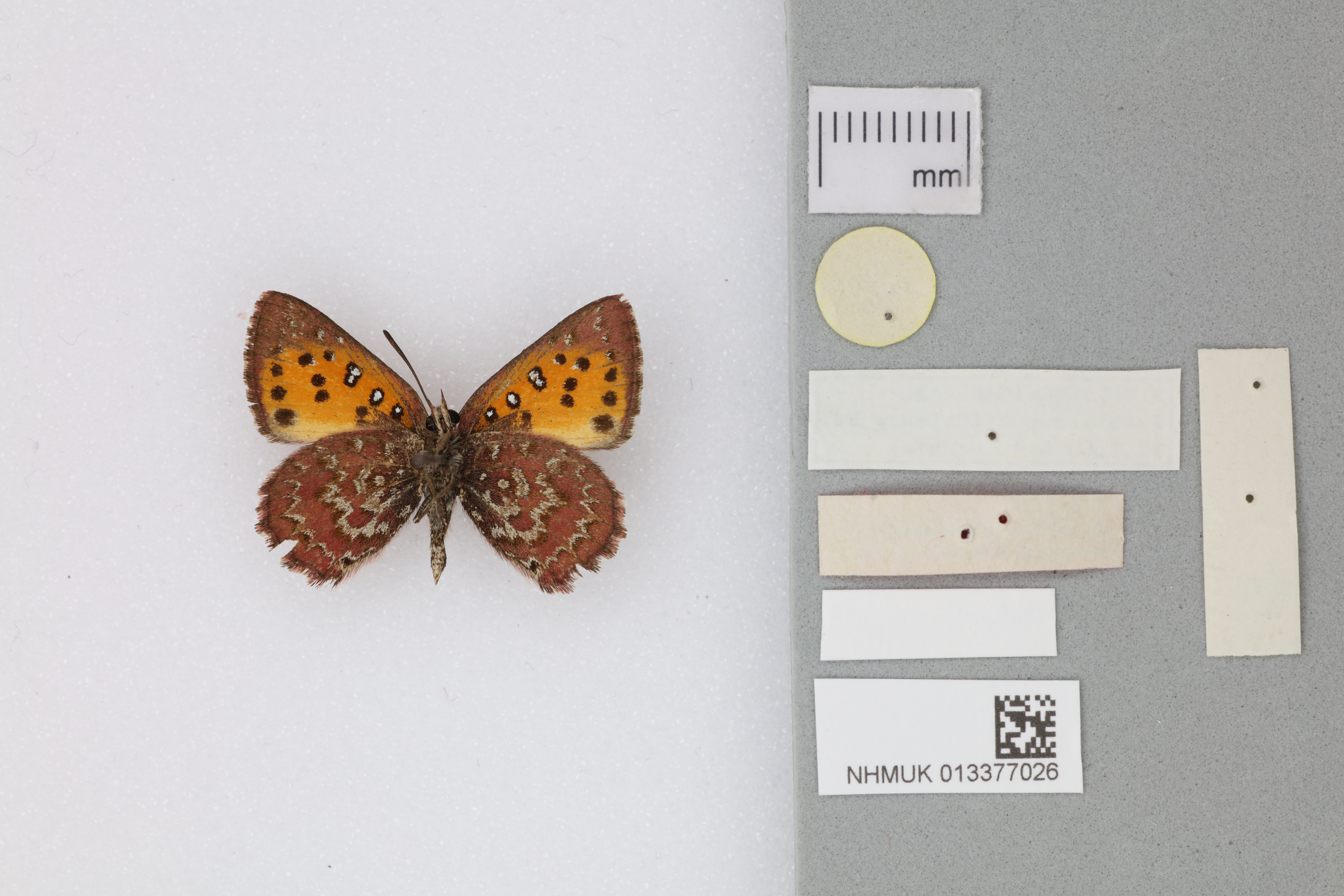

Conservation status
- Critically Endangered (IUCN 3.1)

Scientific classification
- Kingdom: Animalia
- Phylum: Arthropoda
- Class: Insecta
- Order: Lepidoptera
- Family: Lycaenidae
- Genus: Aloeides
- Species: A. rossouwi

Binomial name
- Aloeides rossouwi Henning & Henning, 1982

= Aloeides rossouwi =

Species of butterfly

Aloeides rossouwi, the Rossouw's copper, is a species of butterfly in the family Lycaenidae. It is endemic to South Africa, where it is found in Mpumalanga south of the Stoffberg.

The wingspan is 22–26 mm for males and 24–28 mm females. Adults are on wing from September to November and from February to March. There are two generations per year.

The larvae are associated with ants of the genus Lepisiota.
