= Aloeides mullini =

Mullin's copper

Conservation status
- Data Deficient (IUCN 3.1)

Scientific classification
- Kingdom: Animalia
- Phylum: Arthropoda
- Class: Insecta
- Order: Lepidoptera
- Family: Lycaenidae
- Genus: Aloeides
- Species: A. mullini

Binomial name
- Aloeides mullini Henning & Henning, 1996

Species of butterfly

Aloeides mullini, the Mullin's copper, is a butterfly in the family Lycaenidae. It is found in eastern Zimbabwe. The habitat consists of montane grassland.

Both sexes feed from flowers. They have been recorded from late August to late September.
