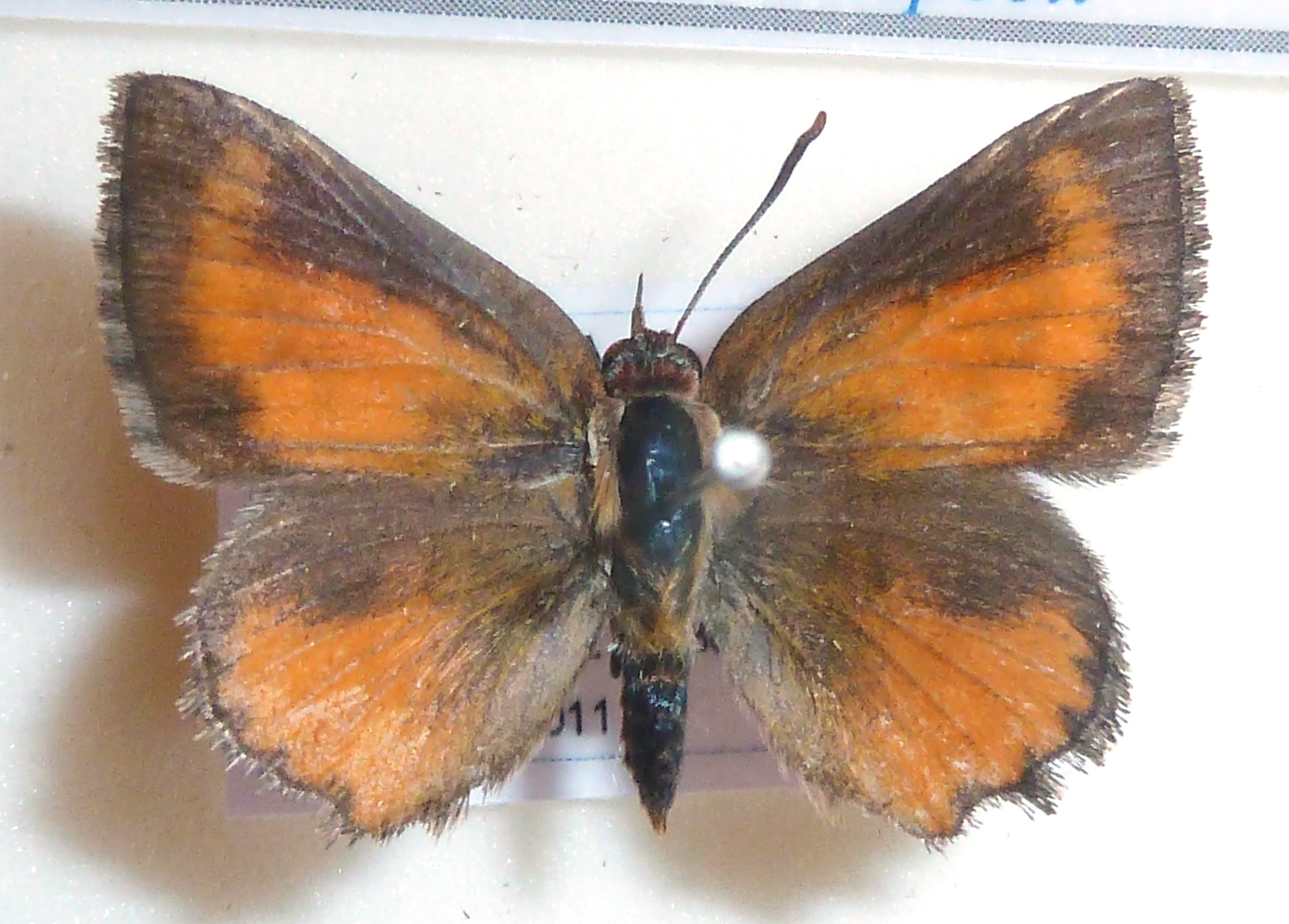

Conservation status
- Least Concern (IUCN 3.1)

Scientific classification
- Kingdom: Animalia
- Phylum: Arthropoda
- Class: Insecta
- Order: Lepidoptera
- Family: Lycaenidae
- Genus: Aloeides
- Species: A. swanepoeli

Binomial name
- Aloeides swanepoeli Tite & Dickson, 1973

= Aloeides swanepoeli =

Swanepoel's copper

Species of butterfly

Aloeides swanepoeli, the Swanepoel's copper, is a butterfly of the family Lycaenidae. It is found in South Africa, where it is found from coastal KwaZulu-Natal to the Drakensberg, north into Mpumalanga and Limpopo.

The wingspan is 25–29 mm for males and 28–30 mm for females. Adults are on wing from September to November and from January to February. There are two generations per year.
