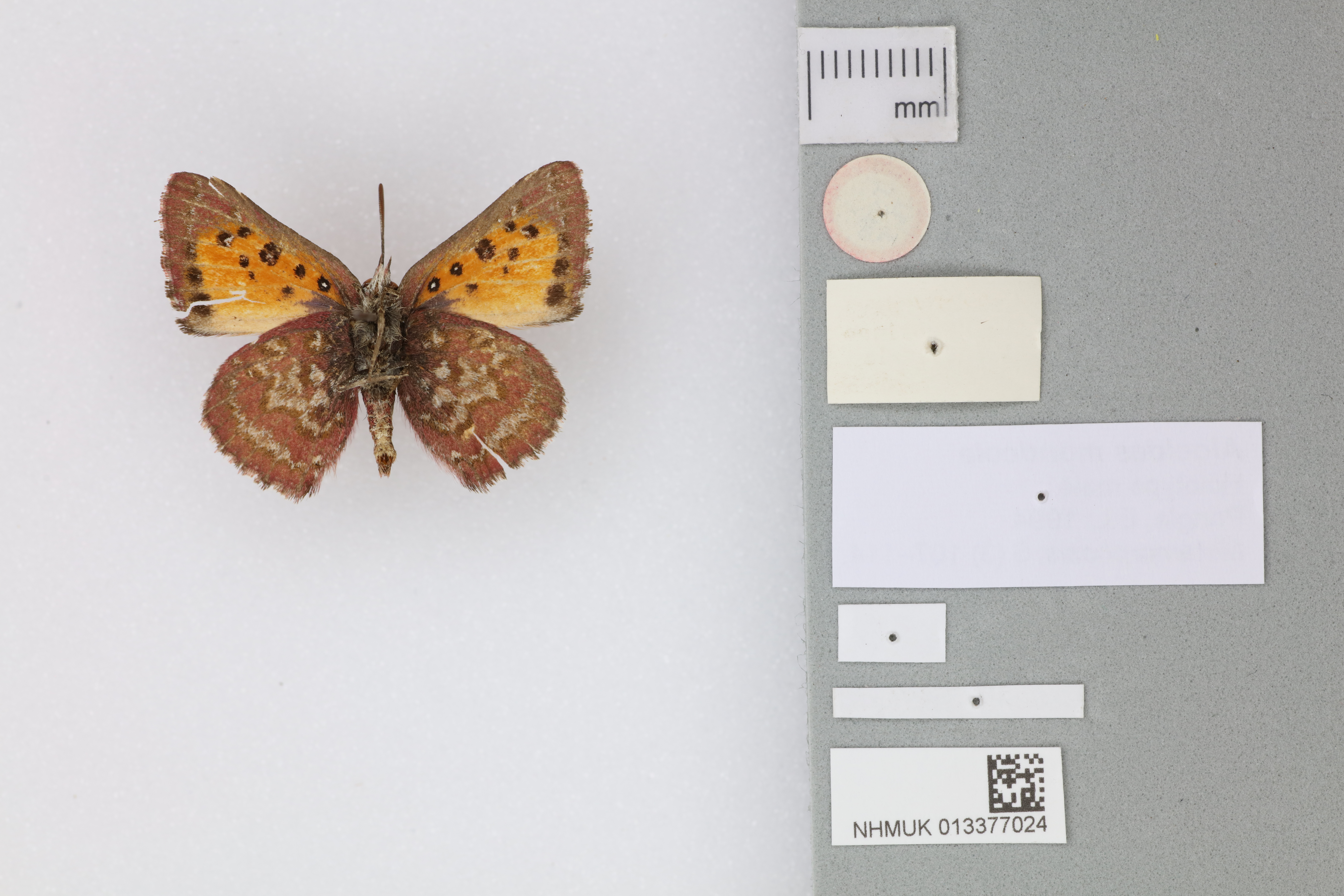

Conservation status
- Least Concern (IUCN 3.1)

Scientific classification
- Kingdom: Animalia
- Phylum: Arthropoda
- Class: Insecta
- Order: Lepidoptera
- Family: Lycaenidae
- Genus: Aloeides
- Species: A. monticola

Binomial name
- Aloeides monticola Pringle, 1994

= Aloeides monticola =

Species of butterfly

Aloeides monticola, the Cederberg copper, is a butterfly of the family Lycaenidae. It is found in South Africa, where it is known from the high slopes of the Cederberg in the Western Cape.

The wingspan is 35–39 mm for males and 38–45 mm females. Adults are on wing from August to November. There is one generation per year.
