= Aloeides caffrariae =

Conservation status
- Least Concern (IUCN 3.1)

Scientific classification
- Kingdom: Animalia
- Phylum: Arthropoda
- Class: Insecta
- Order: Lepidoptera
- Family: Lycaenidae
- Genus: Aloeides
- Species: A. caffrariae

Binomial name
- Aloeides caffrariae Henning, 1987

Species of butterfly

Aloeides caffrariae, the border copper, is a butterfly of the family Lycaenidae. It is found in South Africa, where it is known from coastal grassland in the Eastern Cape.

The wingspan is 25–30 mm for males and 26–33 mm females. Adults are on wing from October to March. There are two or more generations per year.

The larvae feed on Aspalathus species.
