= Aloeides caledoni =

Caledon copper

Conservation status
- Least Concern (IUCN 3.1)

Scientific classification
- Kingdom: Animalia
- Phylum: Arthropoda
- Class: Insecta
- Order: Lepidoptera
- Family: Lycaenidae
- Genus: Aloeides
- Species: A. caledoni

Binomial name
- Aloeides caledoni Tite & Dickson, 1973

Species of butterfly

Aloeides caledoni, the Caledon copper, is a species of butterfly in the family Lycaenidae. It is endemic to South Africa, where it has a wide range but is very rare and localised in the Western Cape.

The wingspan is 35–39 millimetres (1.4–1.5 in) for males and 38–45 mm (1.5–1.8 in) females. Adults are on wing from August to November. There is one generation per year.
