= Aloeides titei =

Conservation status
- Least Concern (IUCN 3.1)

Scientific classification
- Kingdom: Animalia
- Phylum: Arthropoda
- Clade: Pancrustacea
- Class: Insecta
- Order: Lepidoptera
- Family: Lycaenidae
- Genus: Aloeides
- Species: A. titei

Binomial name
- Aloeides titei Henning, 1987

Species of butterfly

Aloeides titei, the Tite's copper, is a butterfly of the family Lycaenidae. It is found in South Africa, where it is known from the northern KwaZulu-Natal Drakensberg foothills to the hills of southern Mpumalanga.

The wingspan is 25–30 millimetres (0.98–1.18 in) for males and 26–33 millimetres (1.0–1.3 in) for females. Adults are on wing from November to February. There is one generation per year.
