= Aloeides carolynnae =

Carolynn's copper

Conservation status
- Vulnerable (IUCN 2.3)

Scientific classification
- Kingdom: Animalia
- Phylum: Arthropoda
- Class: Insecta
- Order: Lepidoptera
- Family: Lycaenidae
- Genus: Aloeides
- Species: A. carolynnae

Binomial name
- Aloeides carolynnae Dickson, 1983

Species of butterfly

Aloeides carolynnae, Carolynn's copper, is a species of butterfly in the family Lycaenidae. It is endemic to South Africa.

The wingspan is 23–28 mm for males and 25–33 mm females. Adults are on wing from September to November and again from January to March in two generations per year.

The larvae probably feed on Aspalathus species.

== Subspecies ==
- Aloeides carolynnae carolynnae (fynbos in the West Cape, the Slanghoek Valley)
- Aloeides carolynnae aurata Pringle, 1994 (fynbos or limestone ridges near De Hoop and sandy ground near Witsand)
