= Aloeides merces =

Wakkerstroom copper

Conservation status
- Least Concern (IUCN 3.1)

Scientific classification
- Kingdom: Animalia
- Phylum: Arthropoda
- Class: Insecta
- Order: Lepidoptera
- Family: Lycaenidae
- Genus: Aloeides
- Species: A. merces

Binomial name
- Aloeides merces Henning & Henning, 1986

Species of butterfly

Aloeides merces, the Wakkerstroom copper, is a species of butterfly in the family Lycaenidae. It is endemic to South Africa, where it is known from sour montane grassveld in KwaZulu-Natal and Mpumalanga.

The wingspan is 24–28 mm for males and 26–30 mm females. Adults are on wing from October to November. There is one generation per year.
