= Aloeides bamptoni =

Bampton's copper

Conservation status
- Least Concern (IUCN 3.1)

Scientific classification
- Kingdom: Animalia
- Phylum: Arthropoda
- Class: Insecta
- Order: Lepidoptera
- Family: Lycaenidae
- Genus: Aloeides
- Species: A. bamptoni

Binomial name
- Aloeides bamptoni Tite & Dickson, 1977

Species of butterfly

Aloeides bamptoni, the Bampton's copper, is a butterfly of the family Lycaenidae. It is found in South Africa, where it is known from the Northern Cape.

The wingspan is 20–24 mm for males and 22–26 mm females. Adults are on wing from August to December and in late summer (from March to April) in a possible second generation. There is usually one generation per year.
