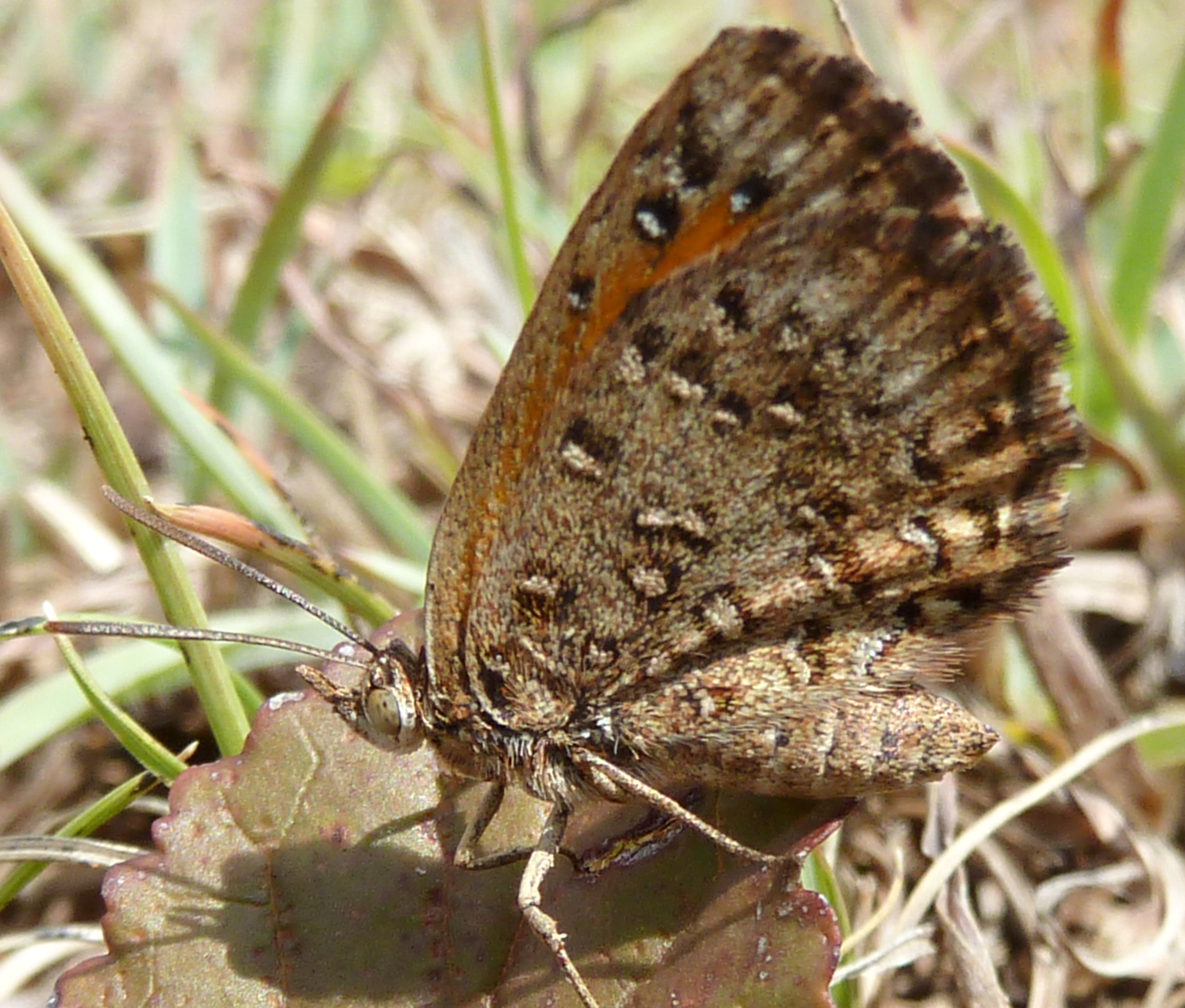
- In the Free State, South Africa

Conservation status
- Least Concern (IUCN 3.1)

Scientific classification
- Kingdom: Animalia
- Phylum: Arthropoda
- Class: Insecta
- Order: Lepidoptera
- Family: Lycaenidae
- Genus: Aloeides
- Species: A. taikosama

Binomial name
- Aloeides taikosama (Wallengren, 1857)

Synonyms
- Cygaritis taikosama Wallengren, 1857; Zeritis orthrus Trimen, 1874

= Aloeides taikosama =

Dusky copper

Species of butterfly

Aloeides taikosama, the dusky copper, is a butterfly of the family Lycaenidae. It is found in South Africa, Botswana, Lesotho, Mozambique and Zimbabwe. In South Africa it is found from the eastern Western Cape to the Eastern Cape, the Free State, northern KwaZulu-Natal, Gauteng, Mpumalanga, Limpopo, North West and the eastern Northern Cape.

== Description ==
The wingspan is 22–27 mm (0.87–1.06 in) for males and 27–33 mm (1.1–1.3 in) for females. Adults are on wing from August to April, with peaks in November and March. There are multiple generations per year.

== Habitat and behavior ==
The butterflies of this group inhabit grassy areas with bare patches, such as grassy fynbos in the western and eastern cape, or highvield grasslands in other provinces.

== Life cycle ==
The species is holometabolous. Oviposotion takes place in favorable weather conditions around mid December. The eggs are relatively large for a lycaenid butterfly, and are spherical in shape and pale in color.

The males of Aloeidis exhibit territorial behavior, claiming specific areas on road verges and unsurfaced roads where they can counter females and mate.

The species of Aloeides genus have a preference for host Aspalathus plants.
