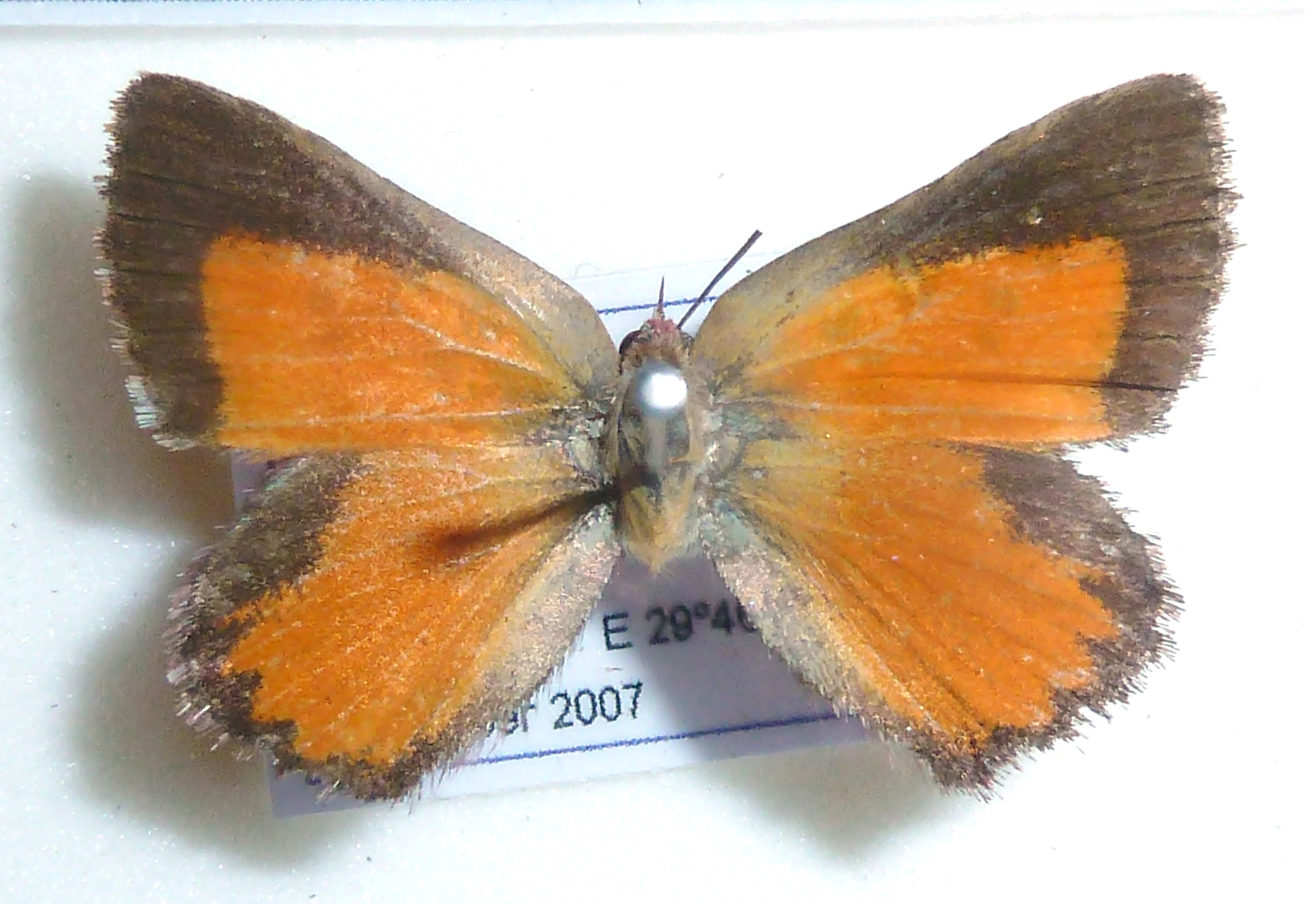
- Male

Conservation status
- Least Concern (IUCN 3.1)

Scientific classification
- Kingdom: Animalia
- Phylum: Arthropoda
- Class: Insecta
- Order: Lepidoptera
- Family: Lycaenidae
- Genus: Aloeides
- Species: A. penningtoni

Binomial name
- Aloeides penningtoni Tite & Dickson, 1968

Synonyms
- Aloeides natalensis Tite and Dickson, 1968

= Aloeides penningtoni =

Pennington's copper

Species of butterfly

Aloeides penningtoni, the Pennington's copper, is a butterfly of the family Lycaenidae. It is found in South Africa, where it is known from the northern Eastern Cape and the Drakensberg foothills to the KwaZulu-Natal midlands and the Ngoye and Enseleni forests.

The wingspan is 26–31 mm for males and 28–34 mm females. There are several generations in the warmer months, with adults on wing from August to June with peaks in November and February.
