= Aloeides dicksoni =

Conservation status
- Least Concern (IUCN 3.1)

Scientific classification
- Kingdom: Animalia
- Phylum: Arthropoda
- Class: Insecta
- Order: Lepidoptera
- Family: Lycaenidae
- Genus: Aloeides
- Species: A. dicksoni

Binomial name
- Aloeides dicksoni Henning, 1987

Species of butterfly

Aloeides dicksoni, the Dickson's copper, is a butterfly of the family Lycaenidae. It is found in South Africa, where it is known from the Eastern Cape Drakensberg.

The wingspan is 25–30 mm for males and 26–33 mm females. Adults are on wing from October to December. There is one generation per year.
