= Aloeides kaplani =

Kaplan's copper

Conservation status
- Least Concern (IUCN 3.1)

Scientific classification
- Kingdom: Animalia
- Phylum: Arthropoda
- Class: Insecta
- Order: Lepidoptera
- Family: Lycaenidae
- Genus: Aloeides
- Species: A. kaplani

Binomial name
- Aloeides kaplani Tite & Dickson, 1977

Species of butterfly

Aloeides kaplani, the Kaplan's copper, is a species of butterfly in the family Lycaenidae. It is endemic to South Africa, where it is known from the Western Cape. It was discovered and described in 1977.

The wingspan is 28–32 mm for males and 30–40 mm for females. Adults are on wing from September to December, with a peak in October. There is one generation per year.
