= Aloeides clarki =

Conservation status
- Endangered (IUCN 3.1)

Scientific classification
- Kingdom: Animalia
- Phylum: Arthropoda
- Class: Insecta
- Order: Lepidoptera
- Family: Lycaenidae
- Genus: Aloeides
- Species: A. clarki

Binomial name
- Aloeides clarki Tite & Dickson, 1968

Species of butterfly

Aloeides clarki, the Coega copper, is a butterfly of the family Lycaenidae. It is found in South Africa, where it is known from low slopes and ridges in coastal Karoo flats in the Eastern Cape and flat rocky land further inland.

The wingspan is 25–28 mm for males and 25–29 mm females. Adults are on wing from October to April. There are multiple generations per year.

The larvae feed on Aspalathus species.
