= Aloeides quickelbergei =

Conservation status
- Least Concern (IUCN 3.1)

Scientific classification
- Kingdom: Animalia
- Phylum: Arthropoda
- Class: Insecta
- Order: Lepidoptera
- Family: Lycaenidae
- Genus: Aloeides
- Species: A. quickelbergei

Binomial name
- Aloeides quickelbergei Tite & Dickson, 1968

Species of butterfly

Aloeides quickelbergei, the Quickelberge's copper, is a butterfly of the family Lycaenidae. It is found in South Africa, where it is known from mountain slopes in the southern Western Cape.

The wingspan is 24–26 mm for males and 25–28 mm females. Adults are on wing from November to January. There is one generation per year.
