= Aloeides macmasteri =

McMaster's copper

Conservation status
- Least Concern (IUCN 3.1)

Scientific classification
- Kingdom: Animalia
- Phylum: Arthropoda
- Class: Insecta
- Order: Lepidoptera
- Family: Lycaenidae
- Genus: Aloeides
- Species: A. macmasteri

Binomial name
- Aloeides macmasteri Tite & Dickson, 1973

Species of butterfly

Aloeides macmasteri, the McMaster's copper, is a butterfly of the family Lycaenidae. It is found in South Africa, where it is widespread but localised and known from the Western Cape, then across the Great Karoo to Namaqualand. It is also found from Coega to Grassland in the Eastern Cape.

The wingspan is 28–32 mm for males and 30–35 mm females. Adults are on wing from September to November and from February to April. There are two generations per year.
