= Aloeides lutescens =

Worcester copper

Conservation status
- Endangered (IUCN 3.1)

Scientific classification
- Kingdom: Animalia
- Phylum: Arthropoda
- Class: Insecta
- Order: Lepidoptera
- Family: Lycaenidae
- Genus: Aloeides
- Species: A. lutescens

Binomial name
- Aloeides lutescens Tite & Dickson, 1968

Species of butterfly

Aloeides lutescens, the Worcester copper, is a species of butterfly in the family Lycaenidae. It is endemic to South Africa, where it is known from sandy flats along the Breede River in the Worcester area and the Robertson Karoo in the West Cape.

The wingspan is 25–28 mm for males and 27–33 mm females. Adults are on wing from September to December and again from January to March in two generations per year.

The larvae probably feed on Aspalathus species.
