= Aloeides braueri =

Brauer's copper

Conservation status
- Least Concern (IUCN 3.1)

Scientific classification
- Kingdom: Animalia
- Phylum: Arthropoda
- Class: Insecta
- Order: Lepidoptera
- Family: Lycaenidae
- Genus: Aloeides
- Species: A. braueri

Binomial name
- Aloeides braueri Tite & Dickson, 1968

Species of butterfly

Aloeides braueri, the Brauer's copper, is a butterfly of the family Lycaenidae. It is found in South Africa, where it is known from highland hillsides covered in sour grassveld in the Eastern Cape.

The wingspan is 26–28 mm for males and 28–32 mm females. Adults are on wing from October to November and from January to February. There are two generations per year.
