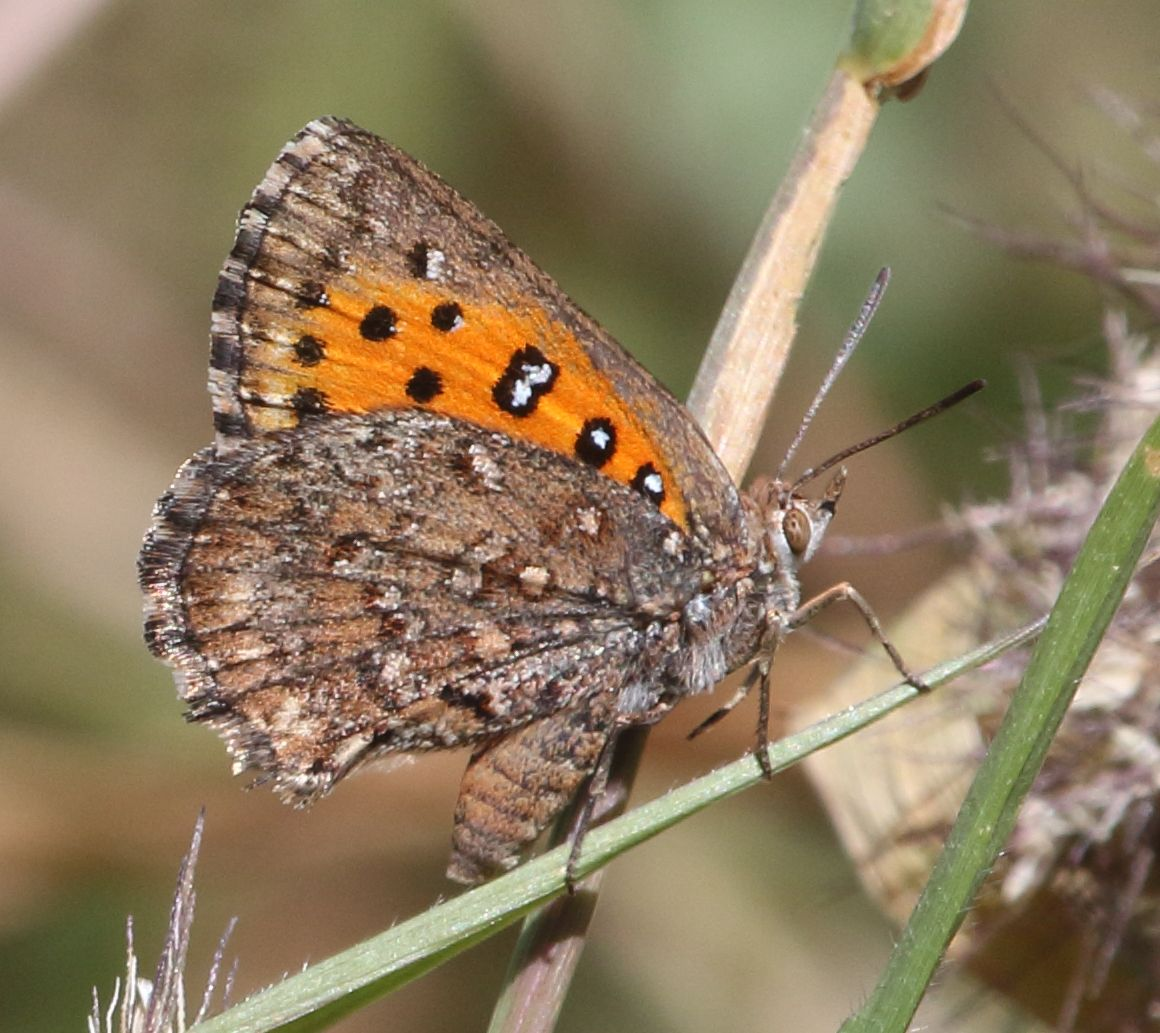

Conservation status
- Least Concern (IUCN 3.1)

Scientific classification
- Kingdom: Animalia
- Phylum: Arthropoda
- Class: Insecta
- Order: Lepidoptera
- Family: Lycaenidae
- Genus: Aloeides
- Species: A. vansoni

Binomial name
- Aloeides vansoni Tite & Dickson, 1968

= Aloeides vansoni =

Species of butterfly

Aloeides vansoni, the Van Son's copper, is a butterfly of the family Lycaenidae. It is found in South Africa, where it is known from the Western Cape, then across the Great Karoo and Roggeveld escarpment, south along the north side of the Swartberg and nearby mountains to the Eastern Cape.

The wingspan is 27–32 mm for males and 29–35 mm females. Adults are on wing from September to January with a peak in December. There is one generation per year.
