= Aloeides plowesi =

Scientific classification
- Domain: Eukaryota
- Kingdom: Animalia
- Phylum: Arthropoda
- Class: Insecta
- Order: Lepidoptera
- Family: Lycaenidae
- Genus: Aloeides
- Species: A. plowesi

Binomial name
- Aloeides plowesi Tite & Dickson, 1973

Species of butterfly

Aloeides plowesi, the Plowes' copper, is a butterfly in the family Lycaenidae. It is found in Zimbabwe.

Adults are on wing from August to November and in May and June.
