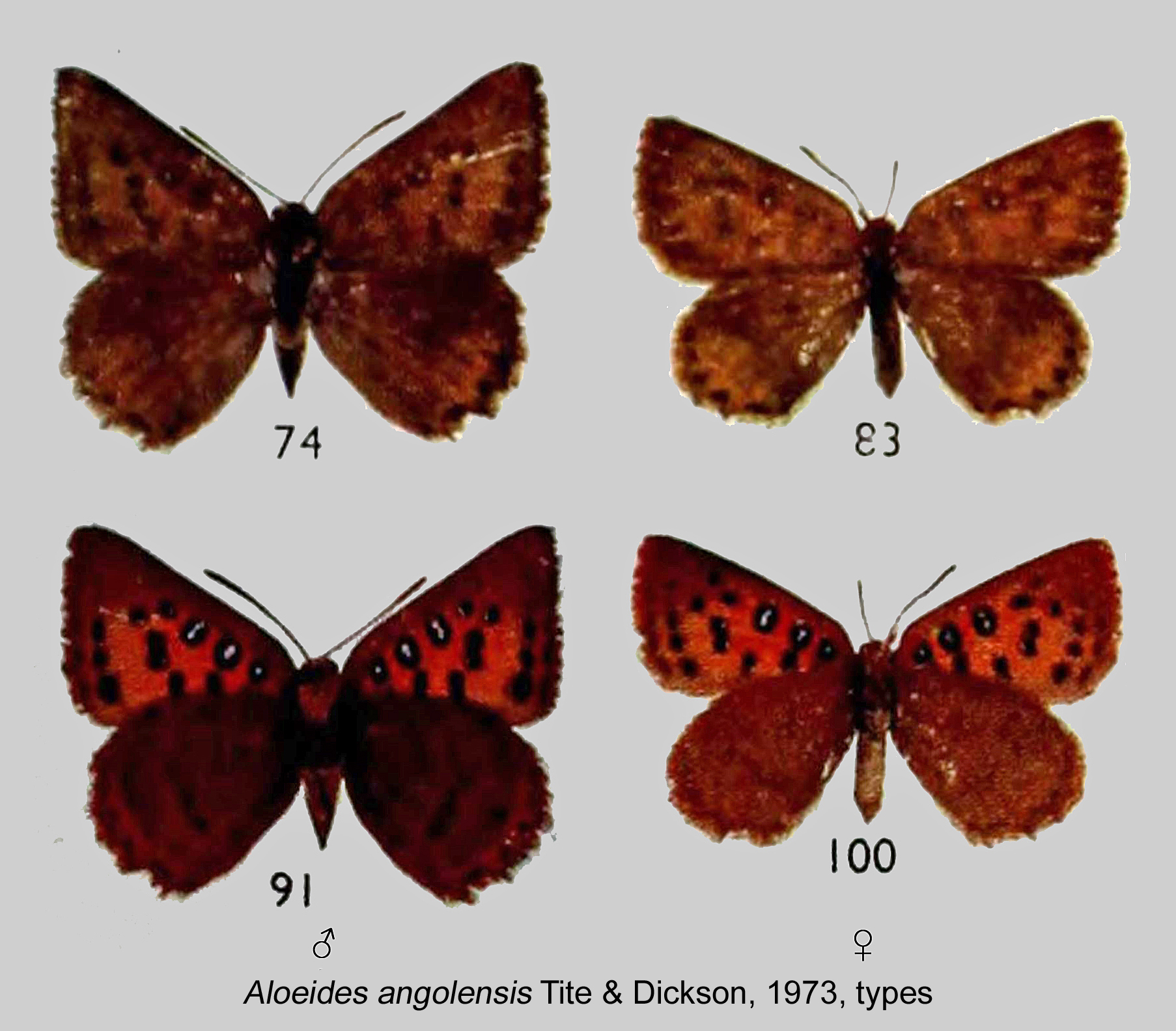

Scientific classification
- Domain: Eukaryota
- Kingdom: Animalia
- Phylum: Arthropoda
- Class: Insecta
- Order: Lepidoptera
- Family: Lycaenidae
- Genus: Aloeides
- Species: A. angolensis

Binomial name
- Aloeides angolensis Tite & Dickson, 1973

= Aloeides angolensis =

Species of butterfly

Aloeides angolensis is a butterfly in the family Lycaenidae. It is found in Angola.
