= Sheba, Mpumalanga =

Sheba
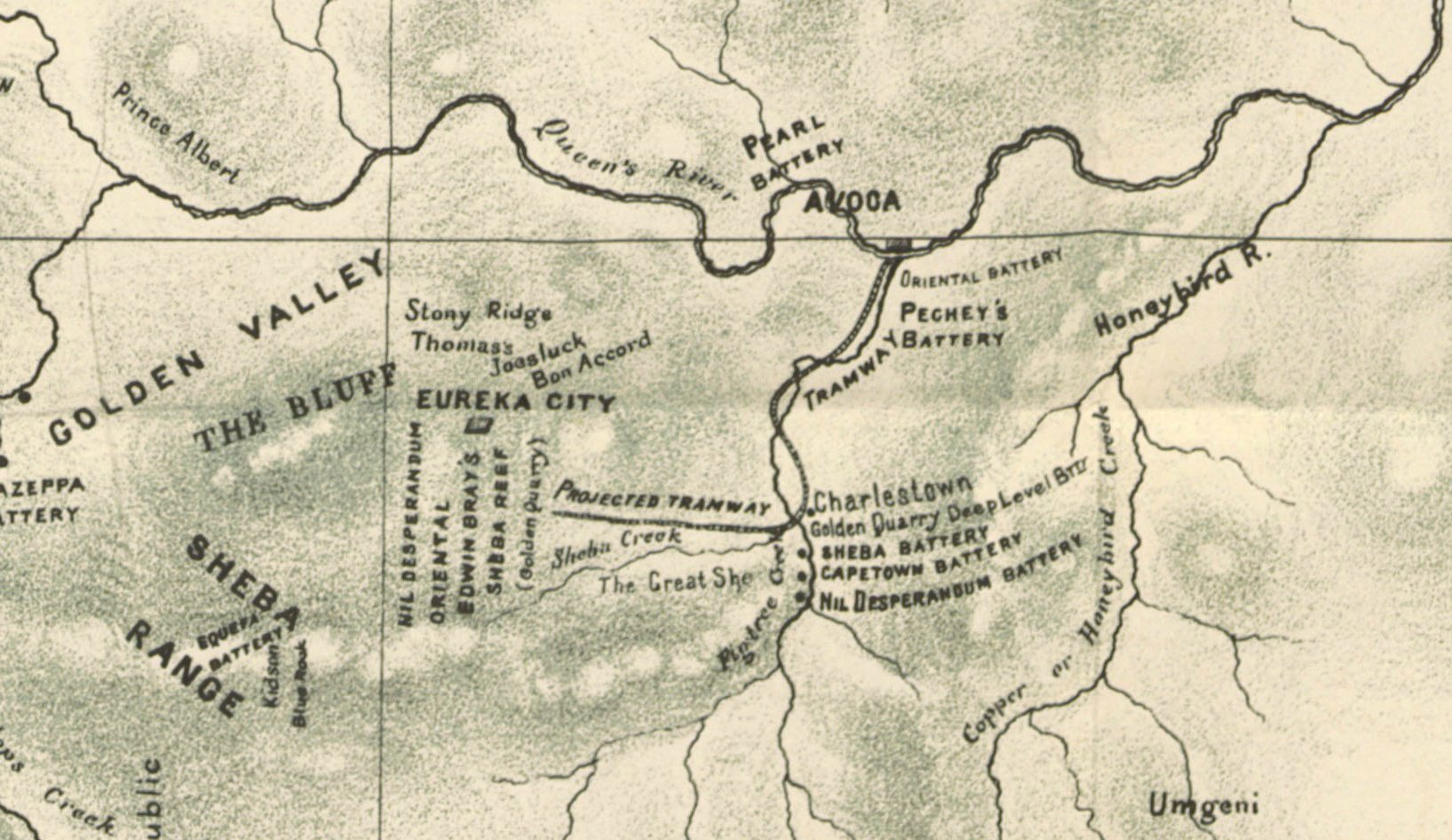
- A map produced during the gold rush

- Location within Mpumalanga Location within South Africa
- Coordinates: 25°43′0″S 31°9′58″E
- Country: South Africa
- Province: Mpumalanga
- District: Ehlanzeni
- Municipality: Mbombela

Area
  - Total: 2.18 km^{2} (0.84 sq mi)

Population (2011)
  - Total: 1,608
  - Density: 738/km^{2} (1,910/sq mi)

Racial makeup (2011)
  - Black African: 99.6%
  - Coloured: 0.4%

First languages (2011)
  - Swazi: 90.6%
  - Tsonga: 3.8%
  - English: 2.5%
  - Other: 3.0%
- Time zone: UTC+2 (SAST)
- Area code: 013

Sheba is a rural settlement northeast of Barberton in the Mpumalanga province of South Africa. It is situated in the De Kaap Valley and is fringed by the Makhonjwa Mountains. It is 35 kilometres (22 mi) south of Nelspruit and 360 kilometres (220 mi) to the east of Johannesburg. On Census 2011 maps it is marked as Bonanza Gold Mine, the name of an old worked-out mine.

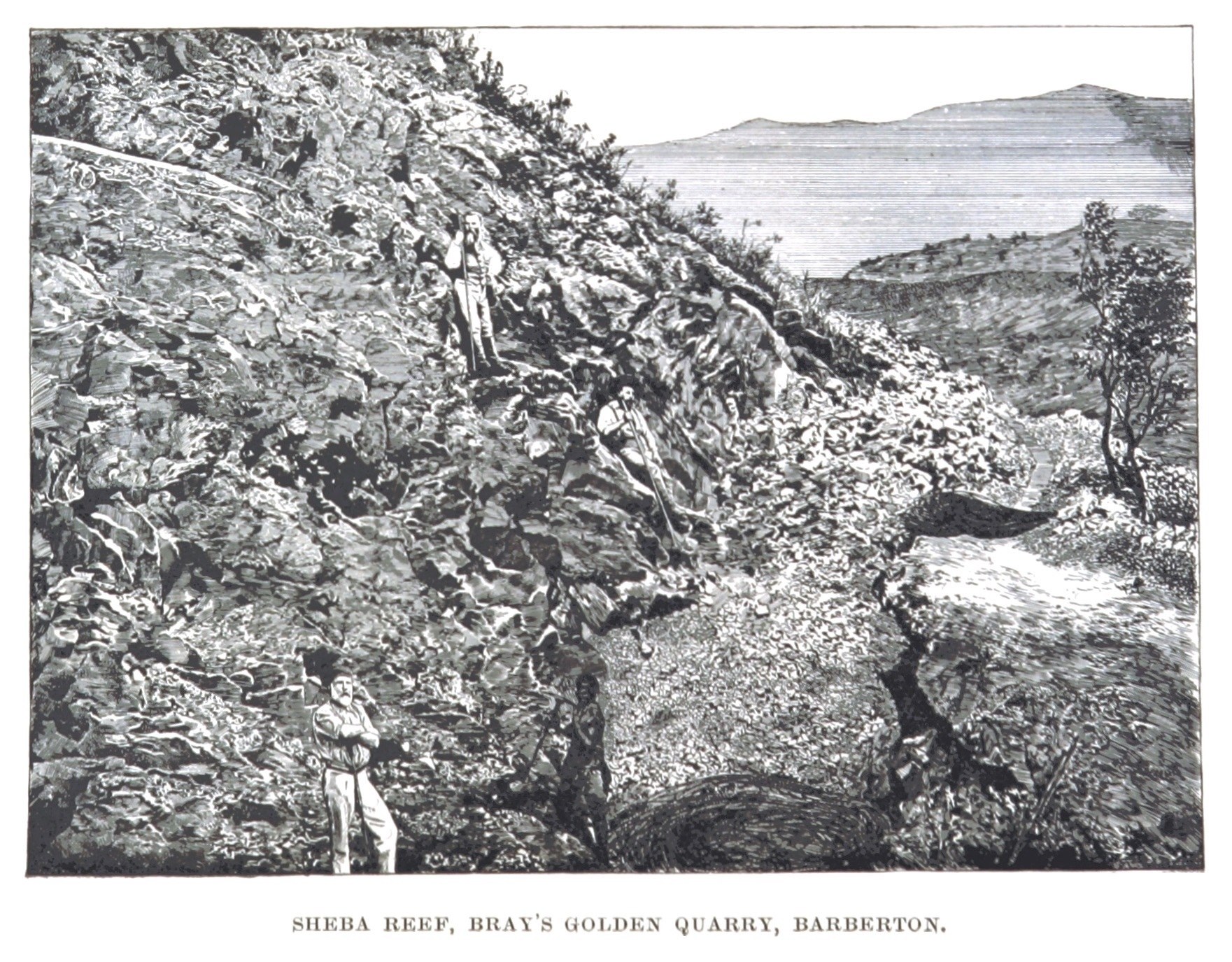
Activities at Bray's Golden Quarry on the Sheba gold reef in 1887
