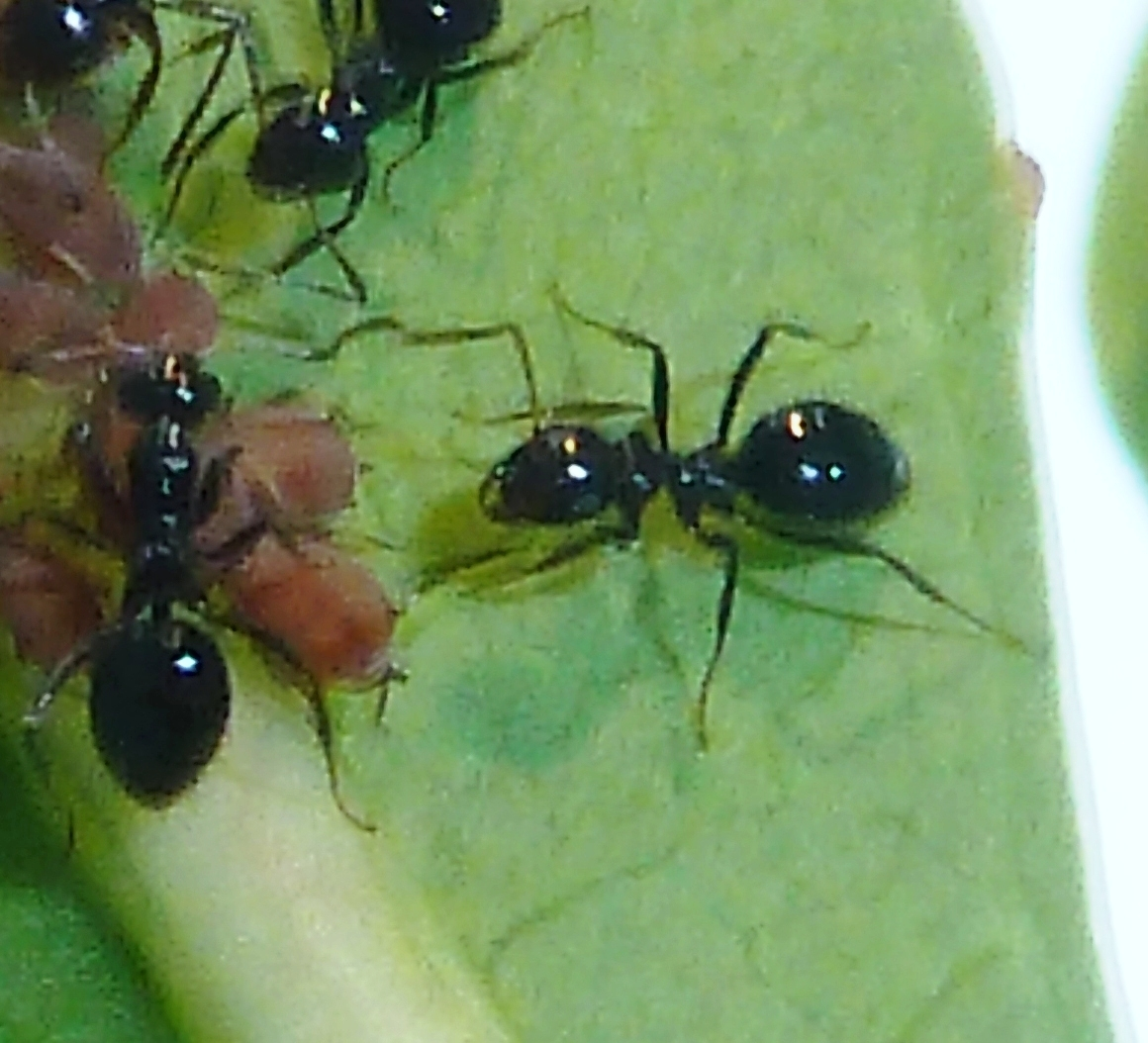

Scientific classification
- Kingdom: Animalia
- Phylum: Arthropoda
- Clade: Pancrustacea
- Class: Insecta
- Order: Hymenoptera
- Family: Formicidae
- Subfamily: Formicinae
- Genus: Lepisiota
- Species: L. capensis

Binomial name
- Lepisiota capensis (Mayr, 1862)

Subspecies
- 13. See text

= Lepisiota capensis =

Species of ant

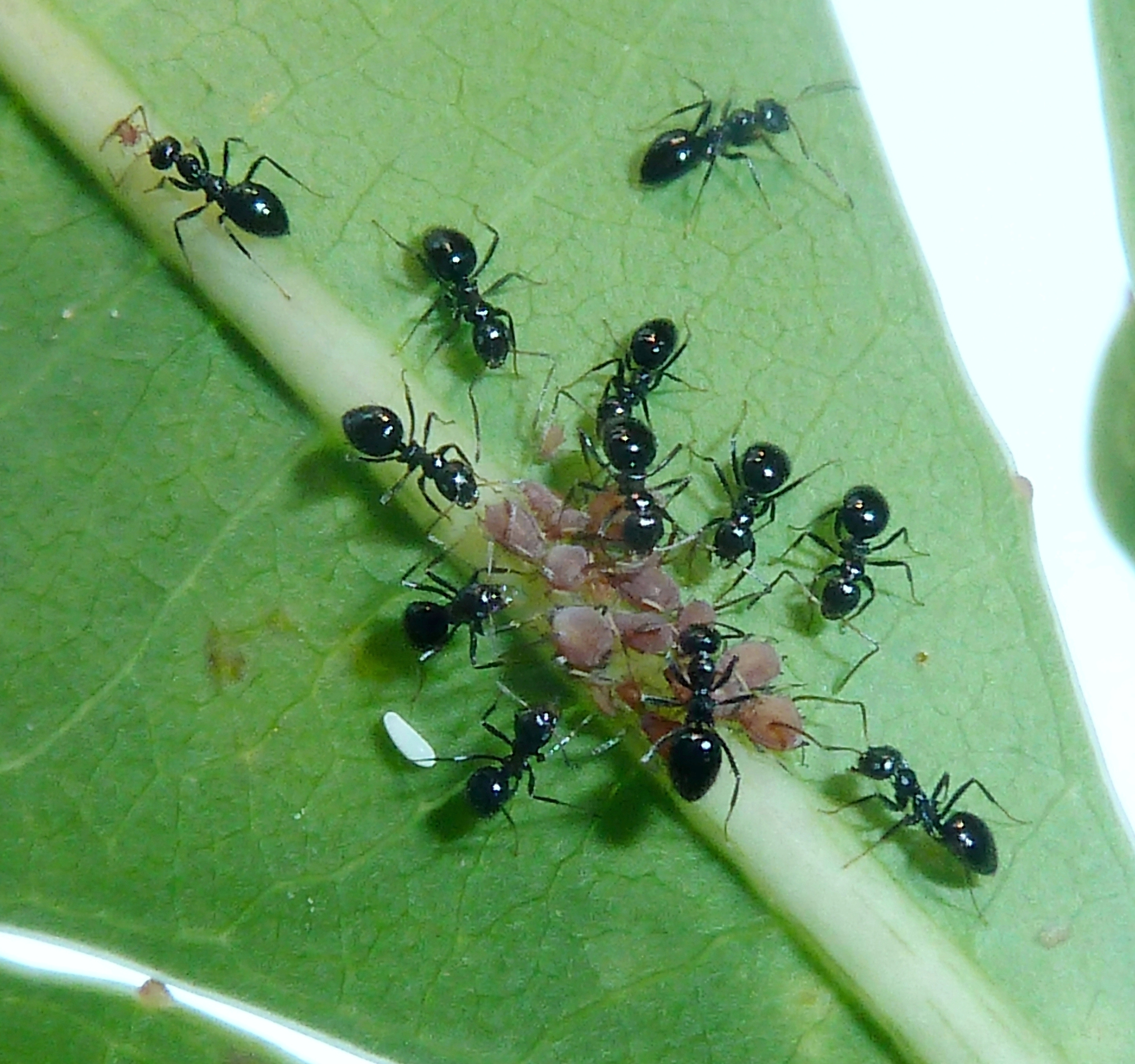
Milking plant lice on a Cussonia leaf

Lepisiota capensis, commonly known as the small black sugar ant, is an Old World ant in the subfamily Formicinae. It is found in countries of the Afrotropical, Malagasy, Oriental, and Palaearctic regions.

== Subspecies ==
- Lepisiota capensis acholli Weber, 1943 – Sudan
- Lepisiota capensis anceps Forel, 1916 – DRC, Kenya
- Lepisiota capensis guineensis Mayr, 1902 – Ghana, Ivory Coast, Kenya
- Lepisiota capensis issore Weber, 1943 – Sudan
- Lepisiota capensis junodi Forel, 1916 – South Africa
- Lepisiota capensis laevis Santschi, 1913 – Senegal
- Lepisiota capensis lunaris Emery, 1893 – Sri Lanka
- Lepisiota capensis minuta Forel, 1916 – South Africa
- Lepisiota capensis simplex Forel, 1892 – Kenya, Lesotho, Saudi Arabia, Somalia, Zimbabwe, Bangladesh, India
- Lepisiota capensis simplicoides Forel, 1907 – South Africa
- Lepisiota capensis specularis Santschi, 1935 – DRC
- Lepisiota capensis subopaciceps Santschi, 1937 – Angola
- Lepisiota capensis thoth Weber, 1943 – Sudan
