= Honey flower =

Honey flower is a common name for several plants and may refer to:

- Lambertia formosa, a shrub from Australia
- Melianthus comosus (honey flower), a shrub native to South Africa and Namibia
- Melianthus major (giant honey flower), a shrub, endemic to South Africa and naturalized elsewhere
- Protea mellifera
