= Phasis =

Phasis may refer to:

== Places and jurisdictions ==
- Phasis (river), modern-day Rioni River in western Georgia
- Phasis (mythology), personification of the above river in Greek mythology
- Phasis (town), an ancient town in the Phasis river delta, near modern-day Poti
- Phasis (titular see), a Latin Catholic titular see

== Biology ==
- Phasis (butterfly), a genus of butterfly
