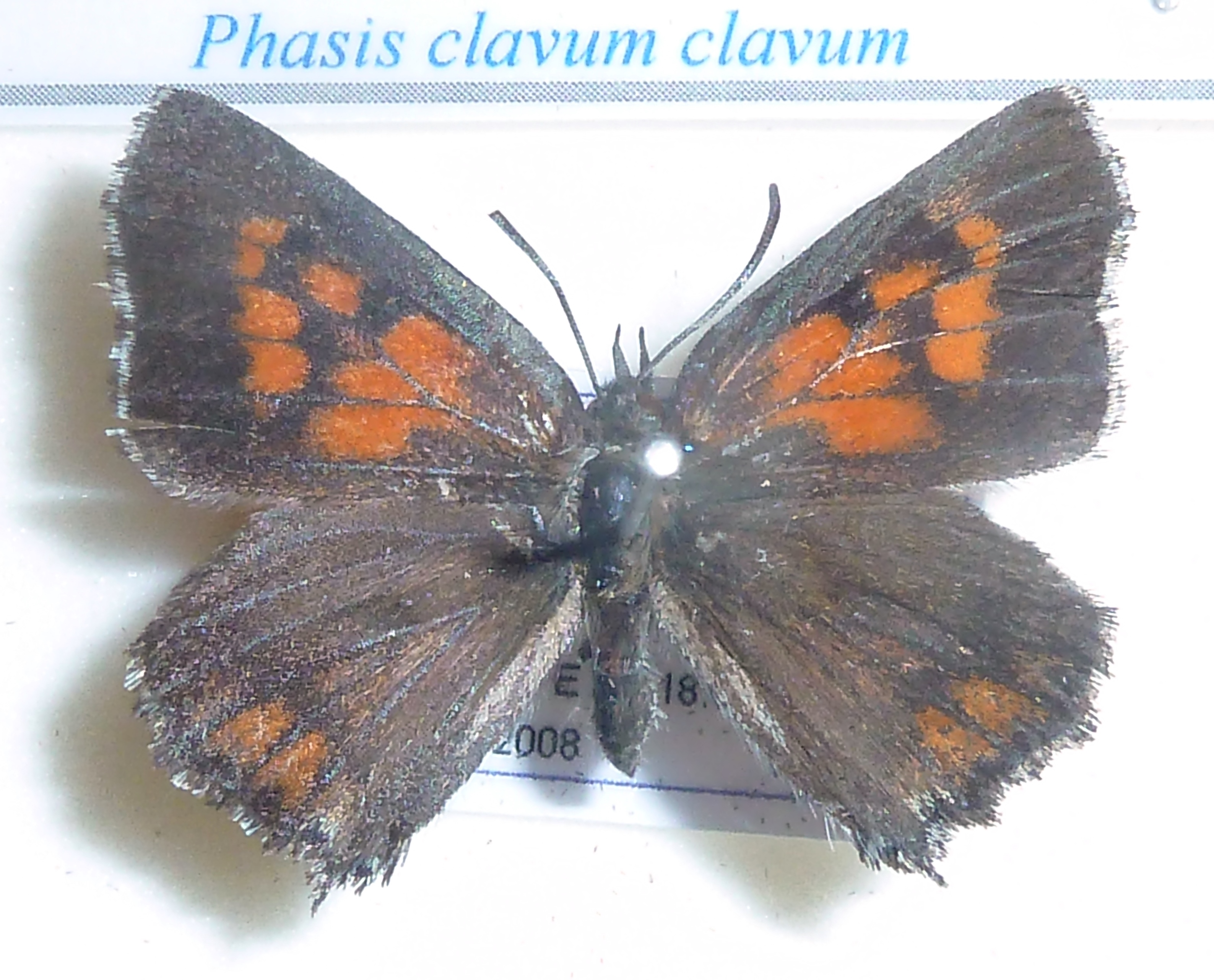

Scientific classification
- Kingdom: Animalia
- Phylum: Arthropoda
- Clade: Pancrustacea
- Class: Insecta
- Order: Lepidoptera
- Family: Lycaenidae
- Genus: Phasis
- Species: P. clavum

Binomial name
- Phasis clavum Murray, 1935

Synonyms
- Phasis thero var. clavum Murray, 1935

= Phasis clavum =

Species of butterfly

Phasis clavum, the Namaqua arrowhead, is a butterfly of the family Lycaenidae. It is found in South Africa and Namibia.

The wingspan is 29-39.5 mm for males and 35–44 mm females. Adults are on wing from September to November and sometimes January.

The larvae feed on Rhus and Melianthus species. They are associated with ants of the genus Crematogaster.

== Subspecies ==
- Phasis clavum clavum (Namibia, South Africa: Western Cape through Namaqualand to the Northern Cape)
- Phasis clavum erythema Quickelberge, 1980 (Roggeveld near Sutherland)
