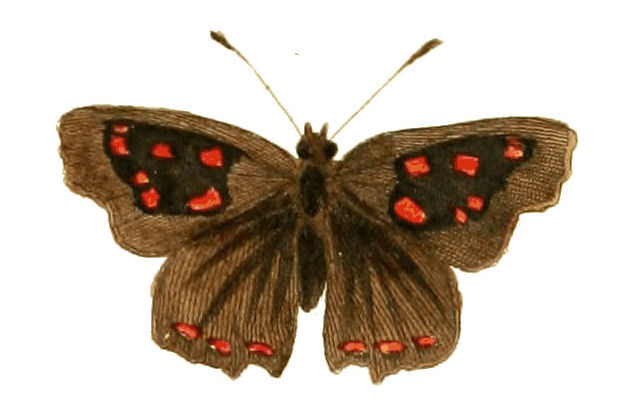

Scientific classification
- Kingdom: Animalia
- Phylum: Arthropoda
- Class: Insecta
- Order: Lepidoptera
- Family: Lycaenidae
- Genus: Phasis
- Species: P. thero

Binomial name
- Phasis thero (Linnaeus, 1764)

Synonyms
- Papilio thero Linnaeus, 1764; Papilio salmoneus Stoll, [1781]; Papilio rumina Drury, 1773; Papilio erosine Fabricius, 1787; Papilio pulsius Herbst, 1793

= Phasis thero =

Species of butterfly

Phasis thero, the silver arrowhead or hooked copper, is a butterfly of the family Lycaenidae. It is found in South Africa.

The wingspan is 31–46 mm for males and 38–47 mm females. Adults of subspecies P. t. thero are on wing from September to November and again from March to May in two generations. Adults of subspecies P. t. cedarbergae are on wing from October to November and probably also in autumn.

The larvae feed on Rhus undulata and Melianthus major. Larvae have been found inside hollow stems of their food plant, but also in nests of Crematogaster peringueyi ants at the base of these stems.

== Subspecies ==
- Phasis thero thero (from the Cape Peninsula, north along coast to Lambert's Bay, east to Knysna)
- Phasis thero cedarbergae Dickson & Wykeham, 1974 (Cederberg and Gifberg)
