= Phasis braueri =

Scientific classification
- Domain: Eukaryota
- Kingdom: Animalia
- Phylum: Arthropoda
- Class: Insecta
- Order: Lepidoptera
- Family: Lycaenidae
- Genus: Phasis
- Species: P. braueri

Binomial name
- Phasis braueri Dickson, 1968

Species of butterfly

Phasis braueri, the Brauer's arrowhead, is a butterfly of the family Lycaenidae. It is found in South Africa, where it is known from the Western Cape to Queenstown in the Eastern Cape.

The wingspan is 32–42 mm for males and 36–45 mm females. Adults are on wing from September to January, with a peak in November.

The larvae feed on Rhus longispina and Melianthus species. They are associated with ants of the genus Crematogaster.
