= List of plants known as honeybush =

Honeybush is a common name for plants in the southern African genus Cyclopia, which are used to make an herbal tea.

Honeybush may also refer to:

- Codon royenii, a plant species from Namibia
- Cuttsia viburnea, a plant species of rainforests in New South Wales and Queensland in Australia
- Hakea lissocarpha, a plant species from Western Australia
- Melianthus major, a plant species from South Africa and naturalised elsewhere
- Richea scoparia, a plant species from Tasmania
