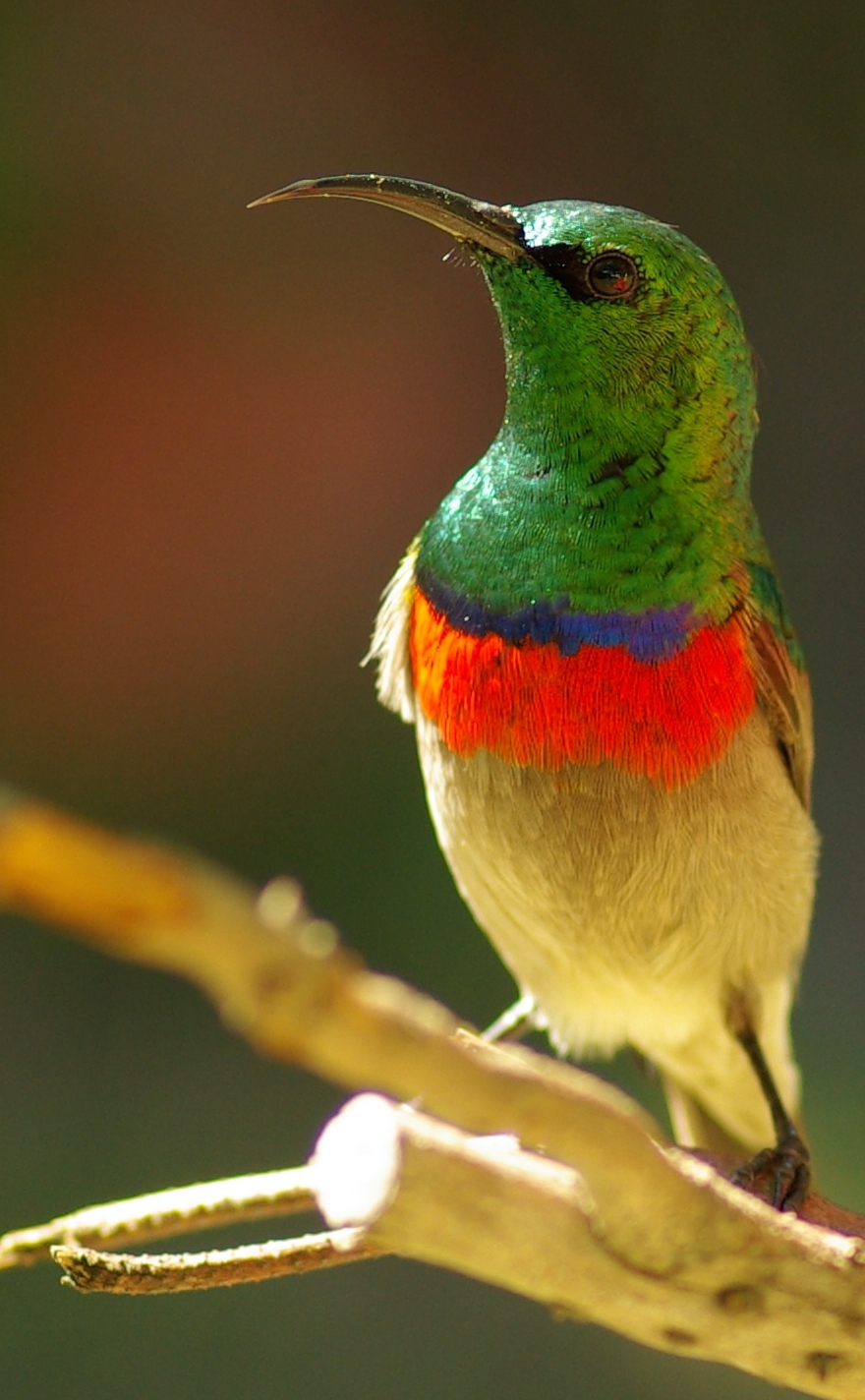
- Male at Greyton, Western Cape, South Africa

Conservation status
- Least Concern (IUCN 3.1)

Scientific classification
- Kingdom: Animalia
- Phylum: Chordata
- Class: Aves
- Order: Passeriformes
- Family: Nectariniidae
- Genus: Cinnyris
- Species: C. chalybeus

Binomial name
- Cinnyris chalybeus (Linnaeus, 1766)
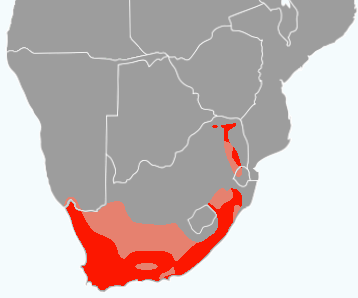
- Range strongholds, occurring year-round lower density, passage or vagrancy

Synonyms
- Certhia chalybea Linnaeus, 1766; Nectarinia chalybea (Linnaeus, 1766)

Audio
- Song and calls recorded in Cape Province, South Africa

= Southern double-collared sunbird =

Species of bird

The southern double-collared sunbird or lesser double-collared sunbird (Cinnyris chalybeus) is a small passerine bird which breeds in southern Africa. It is mainly resident, but partially migratory in the north-east of its range.

== Habitat ==
This sunbird is common in gardens, fynbos, forests and coastal scrub. The southern double-collared sunbird breeds from April to December, depending on region. The closed oval nest is constructed from grass, lichen and other plant material, bound together with spider webs. It has a side entrance which sometimes has a porch, and is lined with wool, plant down and feathers.

== Identification ==
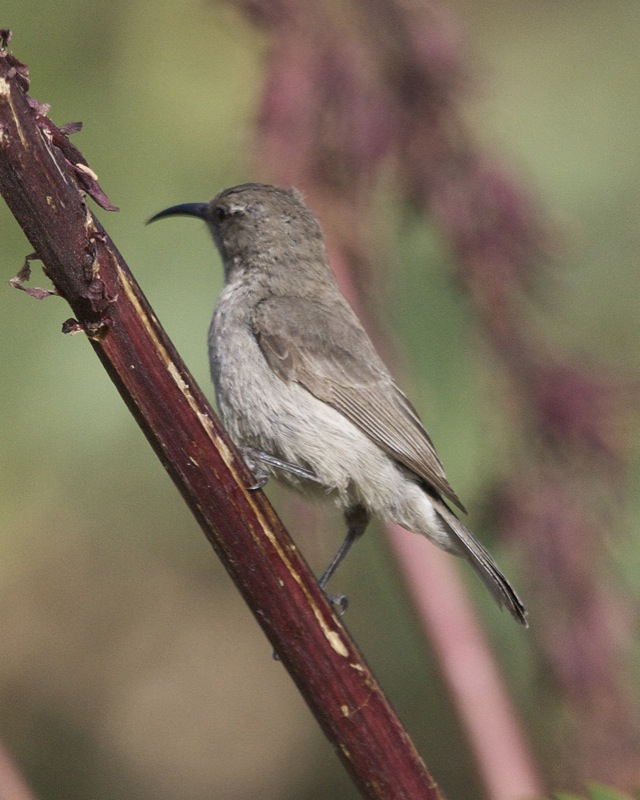
Female at Kirstenbosch, South Africa

The southern double-collared sunbird is 12 cm long. The adult male has a glossy, metallic green head, throat, upper breast and back. It has a brilliant red band across the chest, separated from the green breast by a narrow metallic blue band. The rest of the underparts are whitish. When displaying, yellow feather tufts can be seen on the shoulders. As with other sunbirds the bill is long and decurved. The bill, legs and feet are black. The eye is dark brown. The male can be distinguished from the similar greater double-collared sunbird by its smaller size, narrower red chest band and shorter bill.

The female southern double-collared sunbird has brown upperparts and yellowish-grey underparts. The juvenile resembles the female. The female is greyer below than the female orange-breasted sunbird, and darker below than the female dusky sunbird.

== Behaviour ==
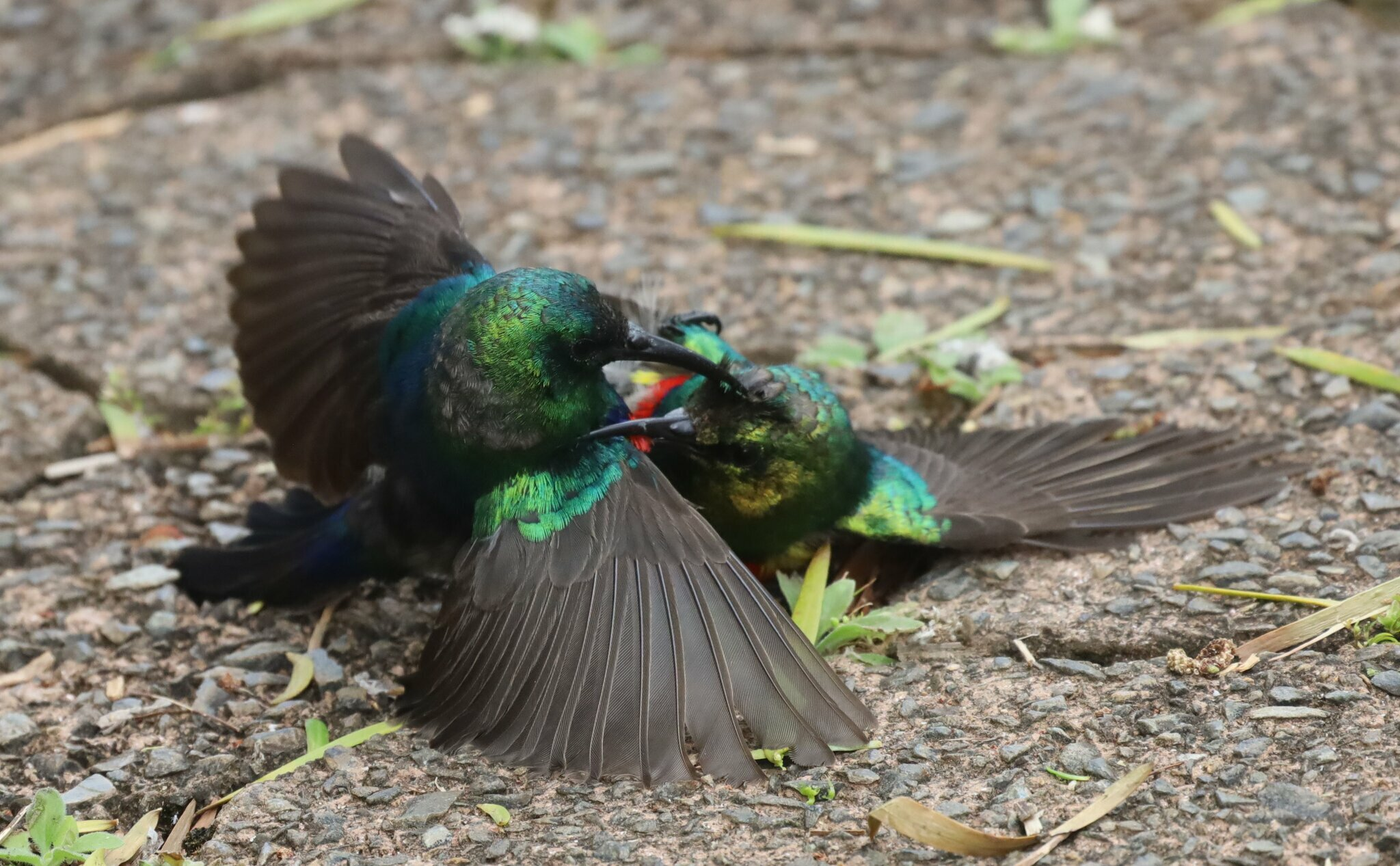
Male C. c. chalybeus fighting

The southern double-collared sunbird is usually seen singly or in small groups. Its flight is fast and direct on short wings. It lives mainly on nectar from flowers, but takes some fruit, and, especially when feeding young, insects and spiders. It can take nectar by hovering like a hummingbird, but usually perches to feed most of the time.

The call is a hard chee-chee, and the song is high pitched jumble of tinkling notes, rising and falling in pitch and tempo for 3–5 seconds or more.

Feeding

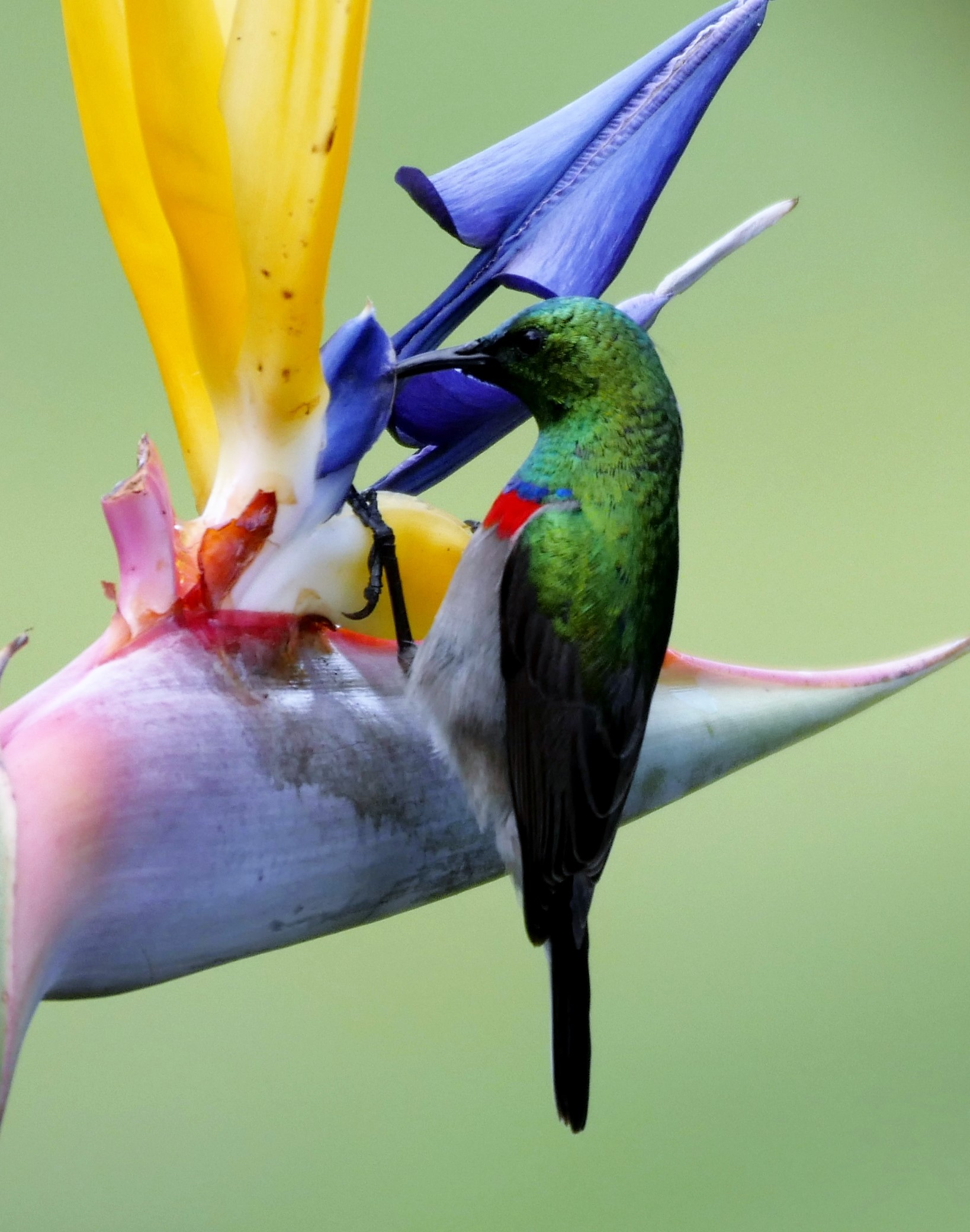
Strelitzia reginae

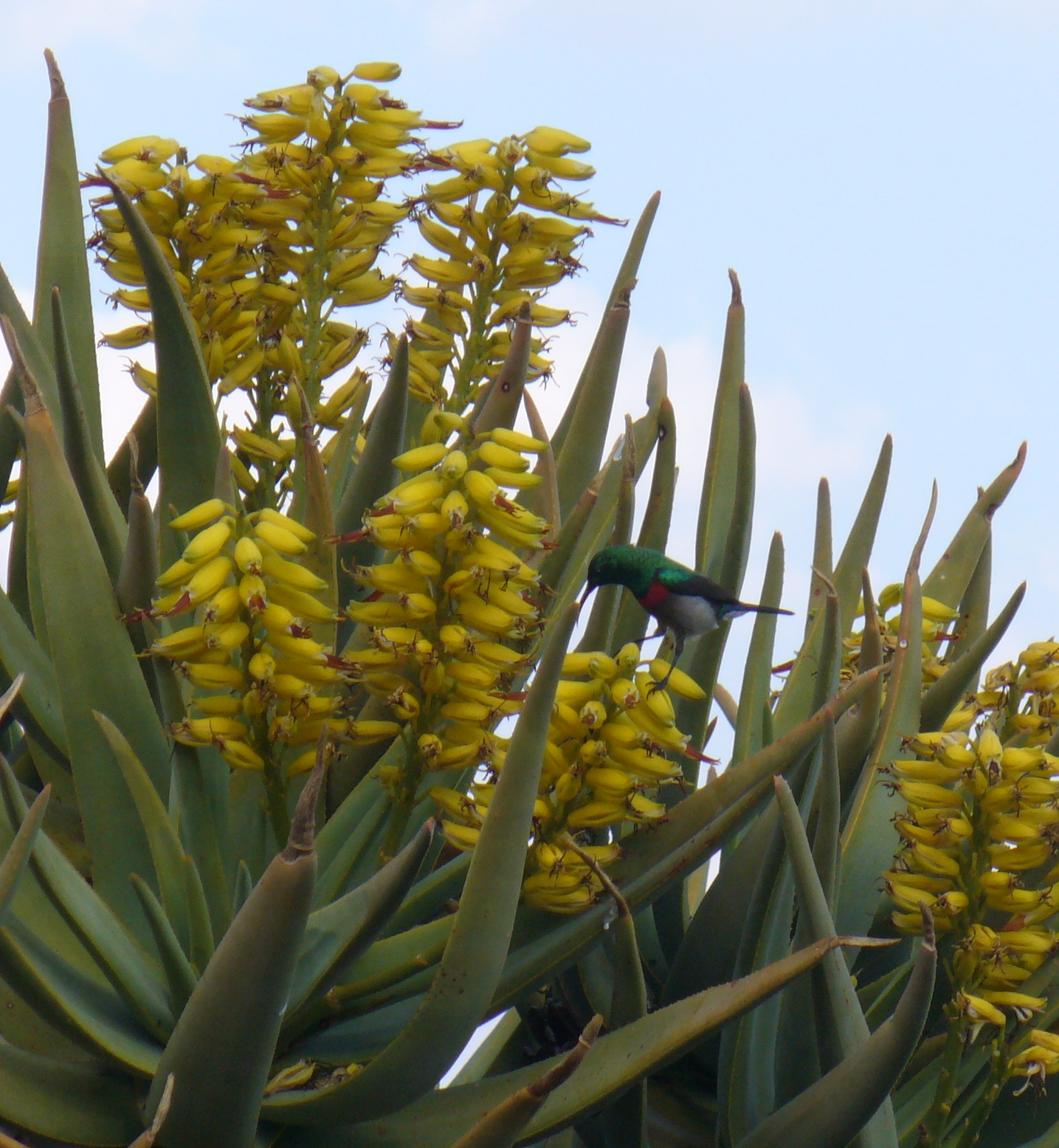
Aloidendron dichotoma

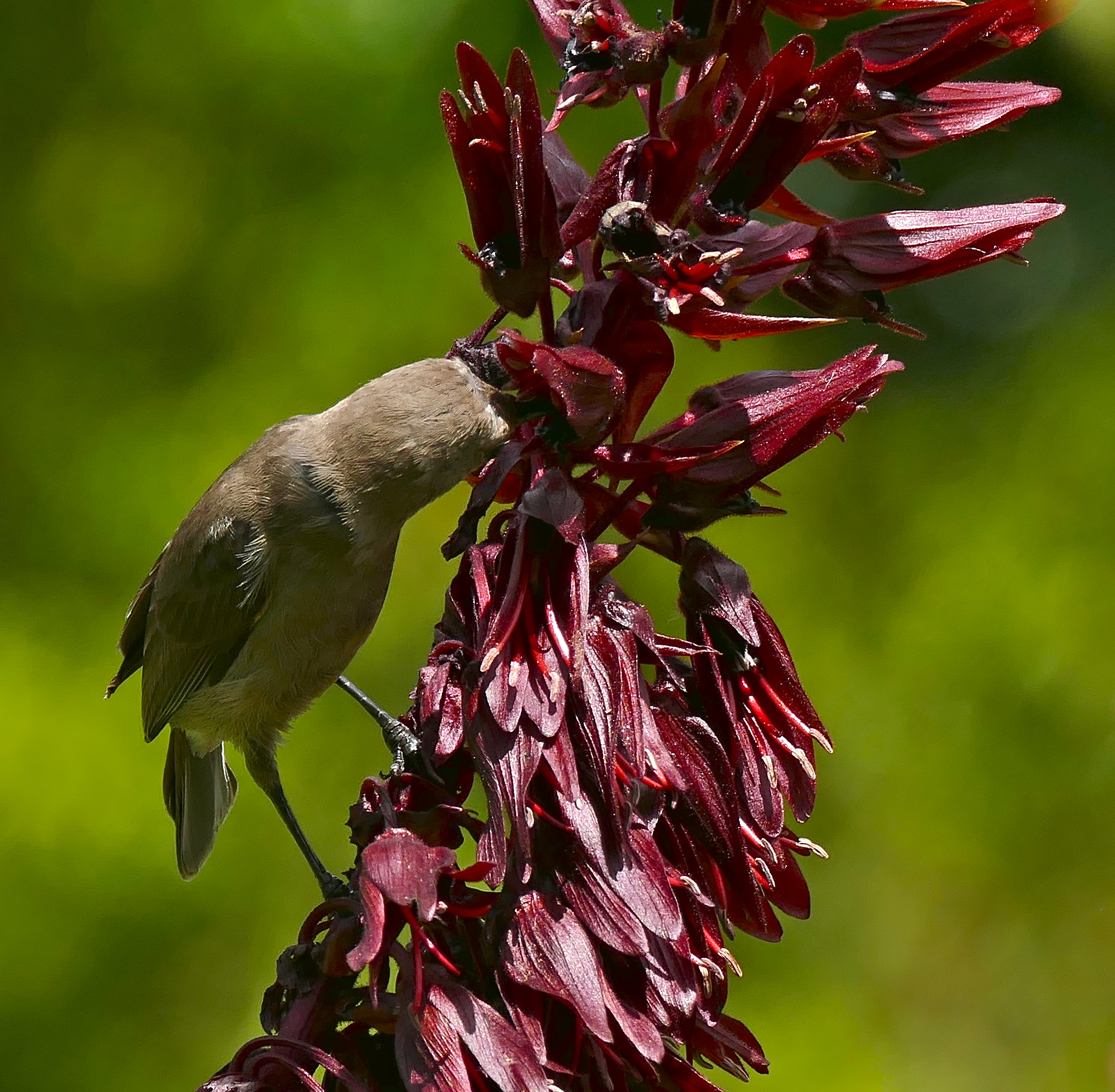
Melianthus major

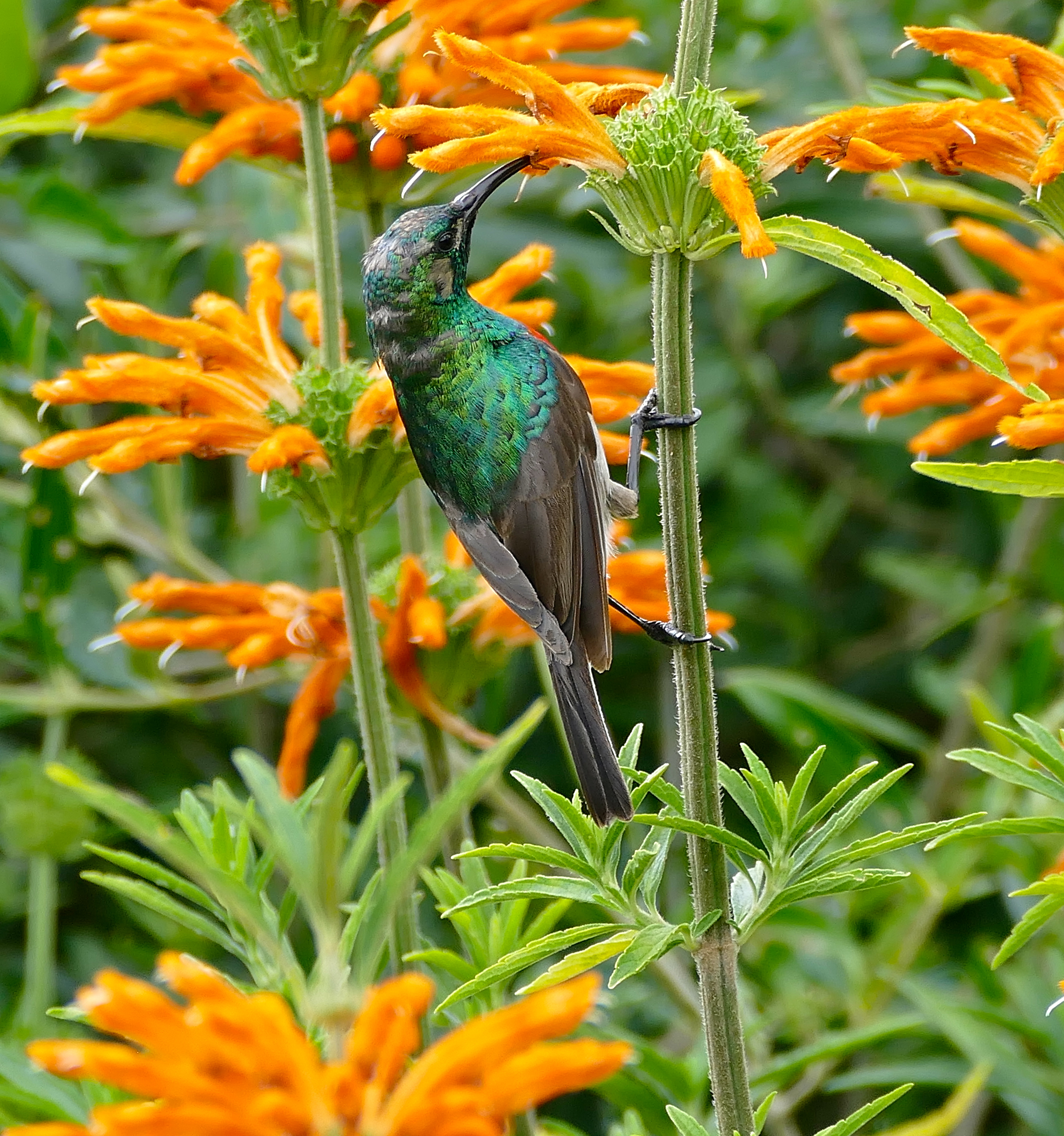
Leonotis leonurus

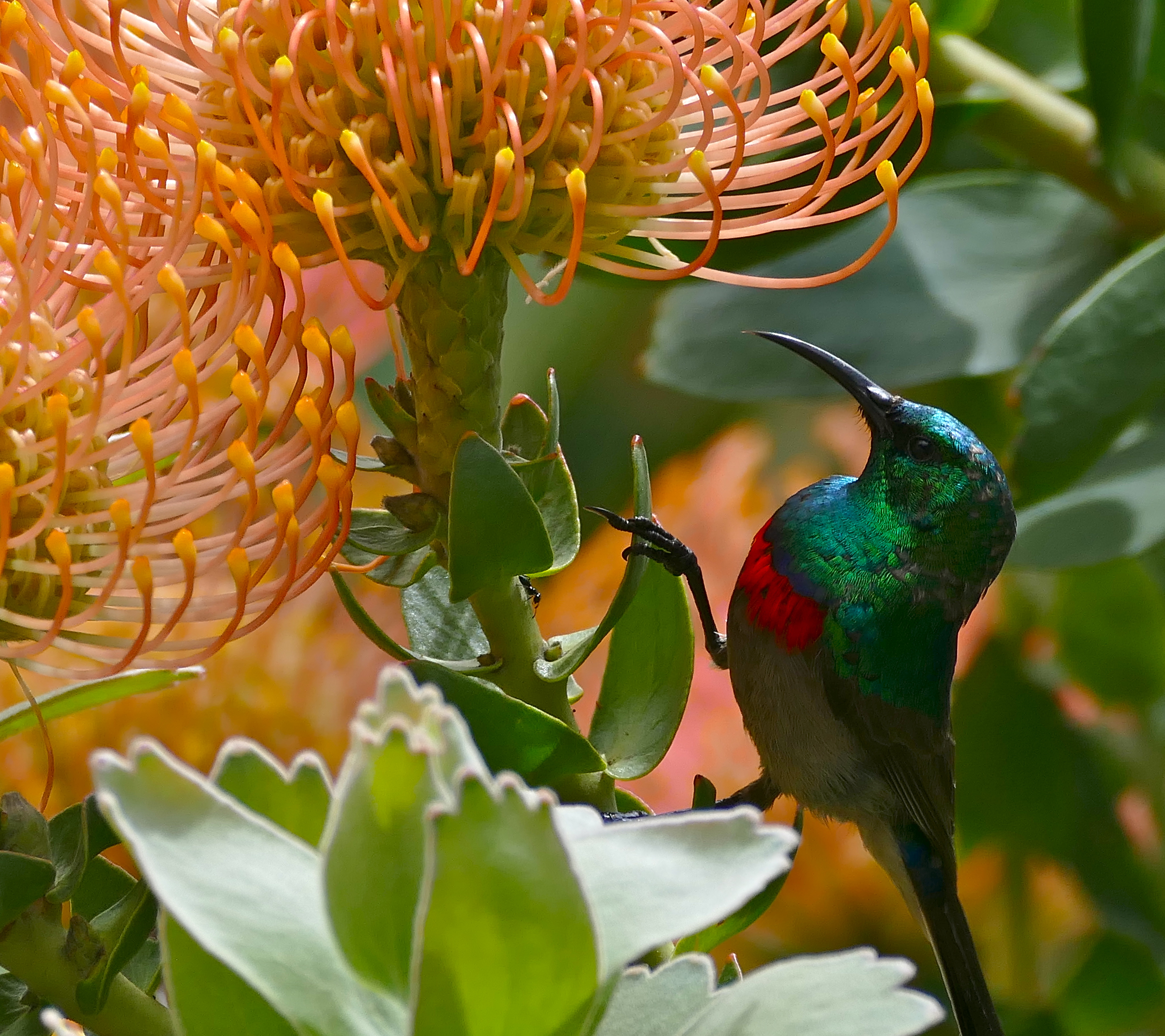
Leucospermum

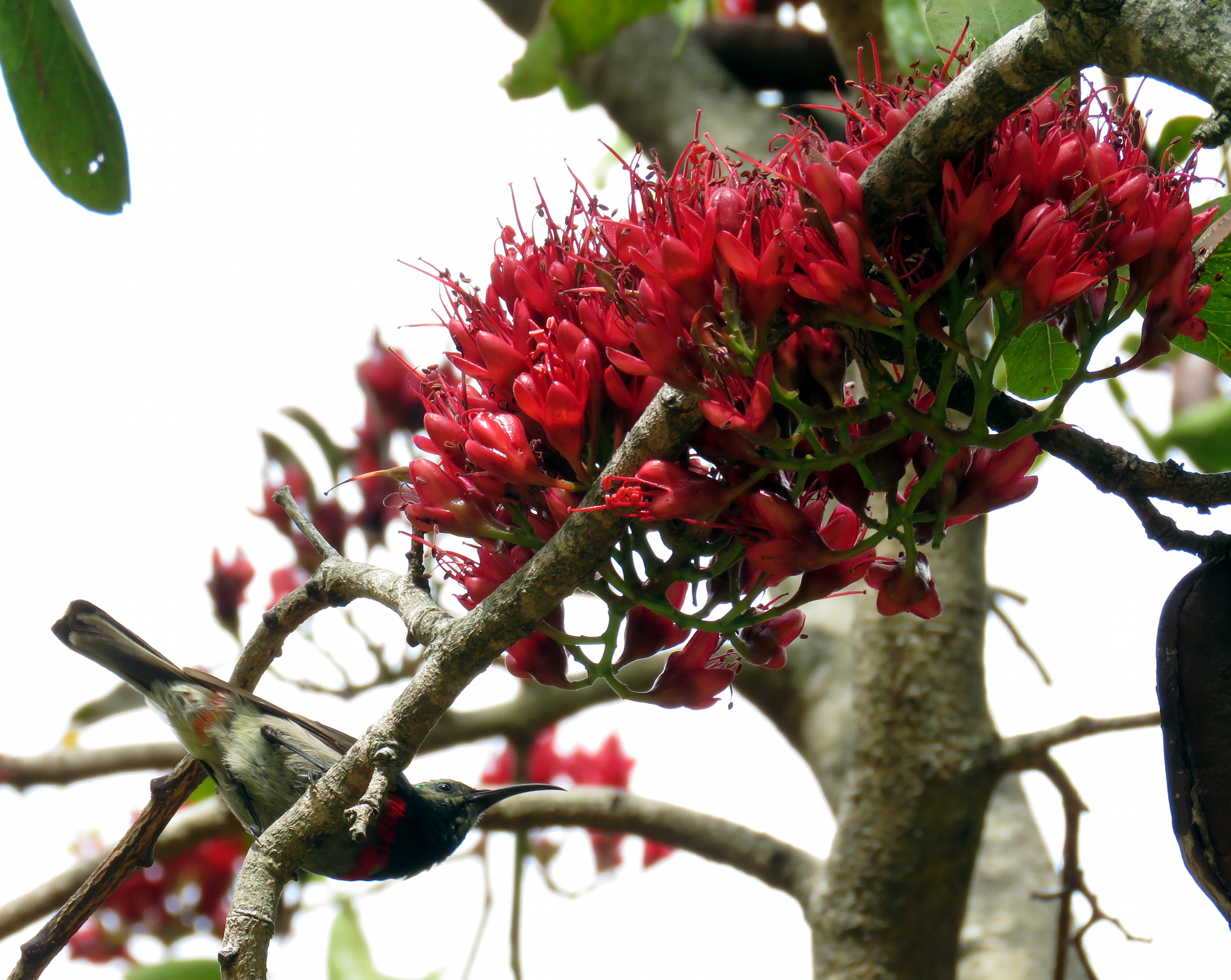
Schotia brachypetala

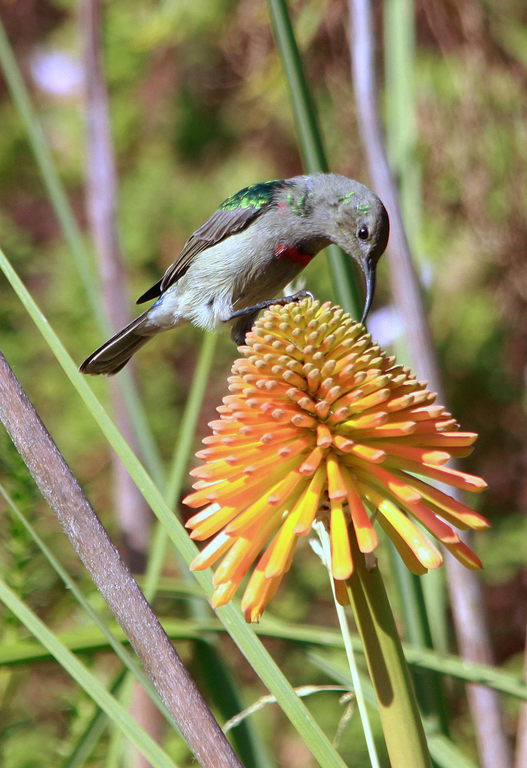
Kniphofia

== Sources ==
Sinclair, Hockey and Tarboton, SASOL Birds of Southern Africa, ISBN 1-86872-721-1
