= Phasis pringlei =

Conservation status
- Least Concern (IUCN 3.1)

Scientific classification
- Kingdom: Animalia
- Phylum: Arthropoda
- Class: Insecta
- Order: Lepidoptera
- Family: Lycaenidae
- Genus: Phasis
- Species: P. pringlei

Binomial name
- Phasis pringlei Dickson, 1977

Species of butterfly

Phasis pringlei, the Pringle's arrowhead, is a species of butterfly in the family Lycaenidae. It is endemic to South Africa, where it is found in the Roggeveld escarpment of Northern Cape.

The wingspan is 32–38 mm for males and 36–43 mm females. Adults are on wing from September to December with a peak in November. There is one generation per year.
