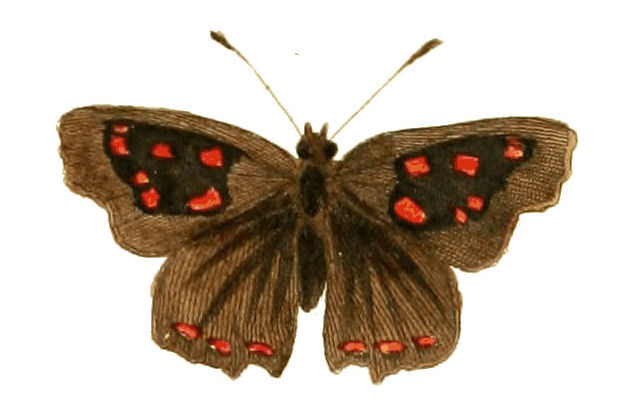
- P. thero

Scientific classification
- Domain: Eukaryota
- Kingdom: Animalia
- Phylum: Arthropoda
- Class: Insecta
- Order: Lepidoptera
- Family: Lycaenidae
- Subfamily: Aphnaeinae
- Genus: Phasis; Hübner, [1819]

Synonyms
- Pseudocapys Murray, 1935

= Phasis (butterfly) =

Butterfly genus in family Lycaenidae

Phasis is an Afrotropical genus of butterflies in the family Lycaenidae.

== Species ==
- Phasis braueri Dickson, 1968
- Phasis clavum Murray, 1935
- Phasis pringlei Dickson, 1977
- Phasis thero (Linnaeus, 1764)
