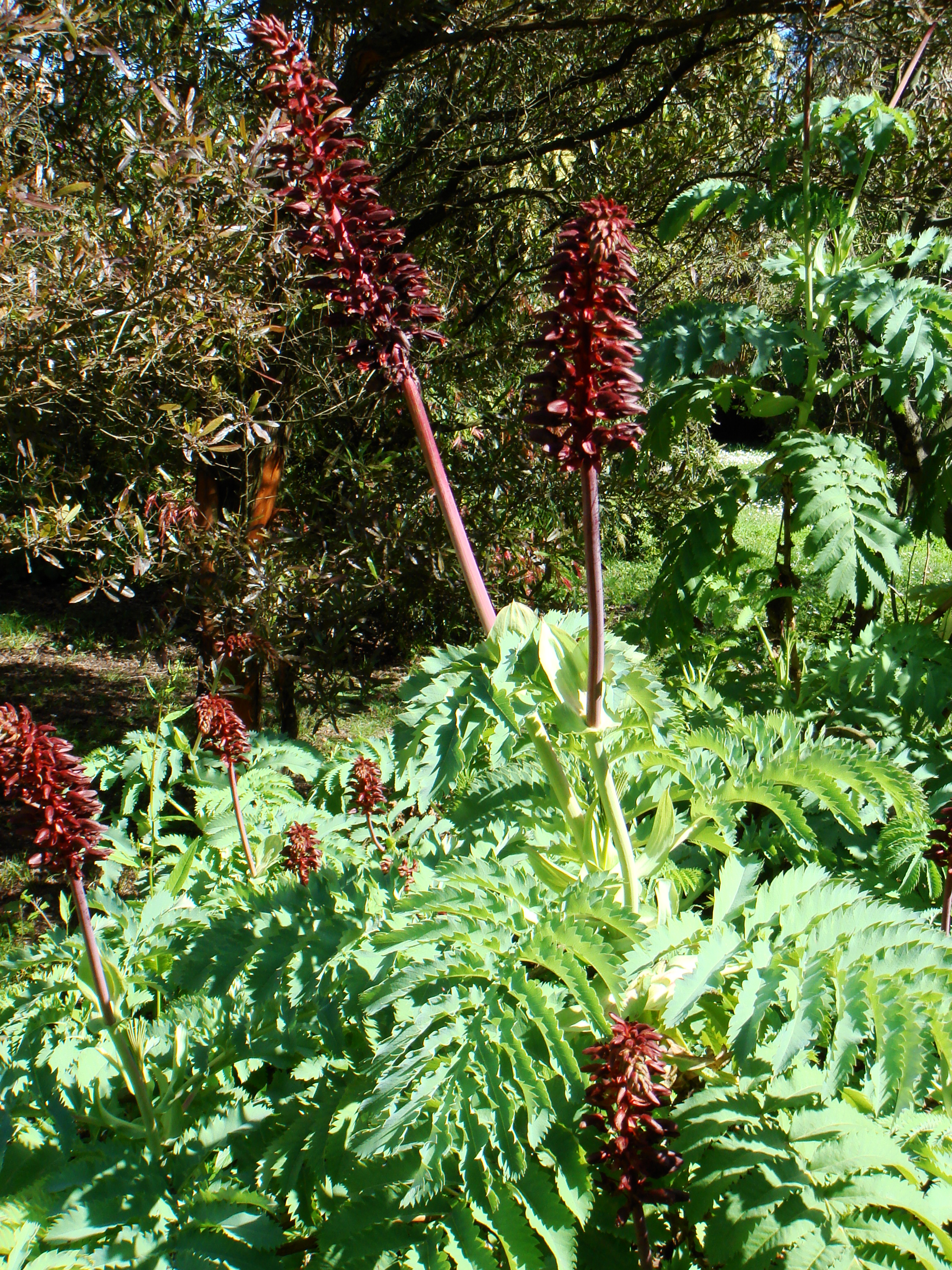

Scientific classification
- Kingdom: Plantae
- Clade: Embryophytes
- Clade: Tracheophytes
- Clade: Angiosperms
- Clade: Eudicots
- Clade: Rosids
- Order: Geraniales
- Family: Francoaceae
- Genus: Melianthus
- Species: M. major

Binomial name
- Melianthus major L.

= Melianthus major =

Species of flowering plant

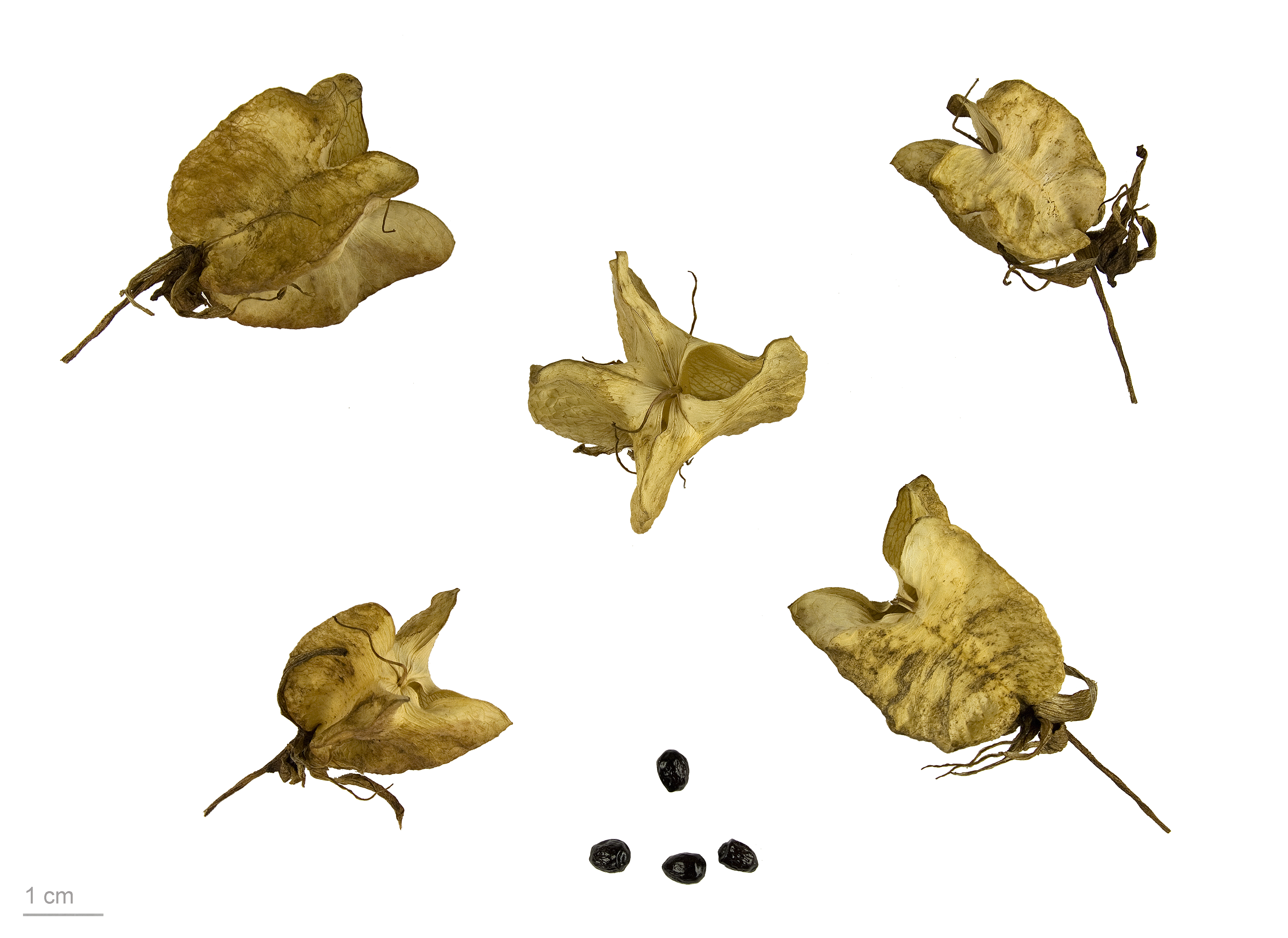
Fruit capsules and seed of M. major

Melianthus major, the giant honey flower or kruidjie-roer-my-nie (Afrikaans for 'herb-touch-me-not'), is a species of flowering plant in the family Francoaceae. It is an evergreen suckering shrub, endemic to South Africa and naturalised in India, Australia and New Zealand. It grows to 2–3 m (7–10 ft) tall by 1–3 m (3–10 ft) wide, with pinnate blue-green leaves 30–50 cm (12–20 in) long, which have a distinctive musky odour. Dark red, nectar-laden flower spikes, 30–80 cm (12–31 in) in length, appear in spring, followed by green pods. All parts of the plants are poisonous.

The Latin binomial Melianthus major literally means "large honey flower". The plant is also sometimes called honeybush (along with many other plants).

In cultivation this plant requires a sheltered location and may also need a protective winter mulch in temperate regions. It has gained the Royal Horticultural Society's Award of Garden Merit.

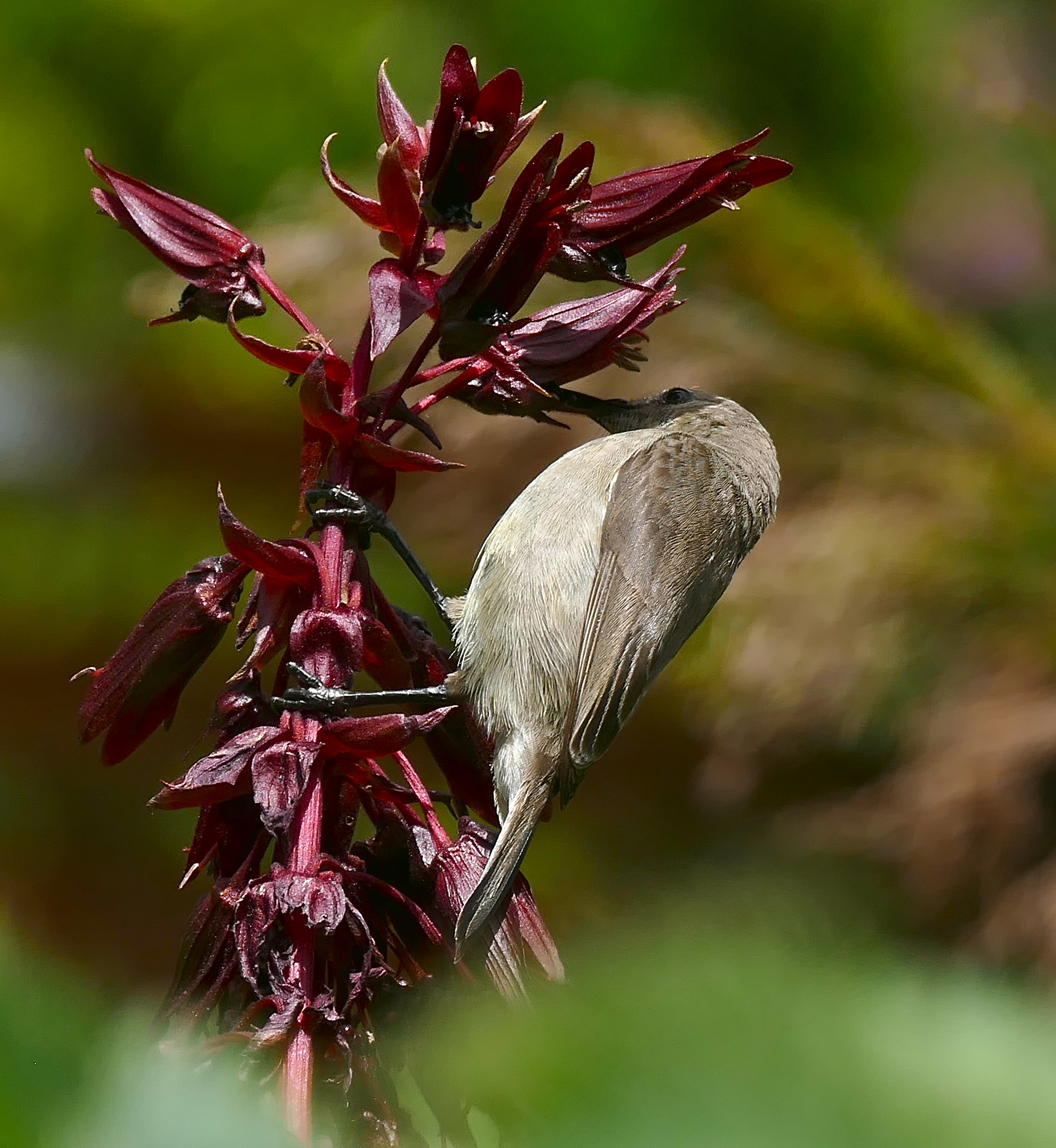
Sunbird (Cinnyris chalybeus) on honey flower

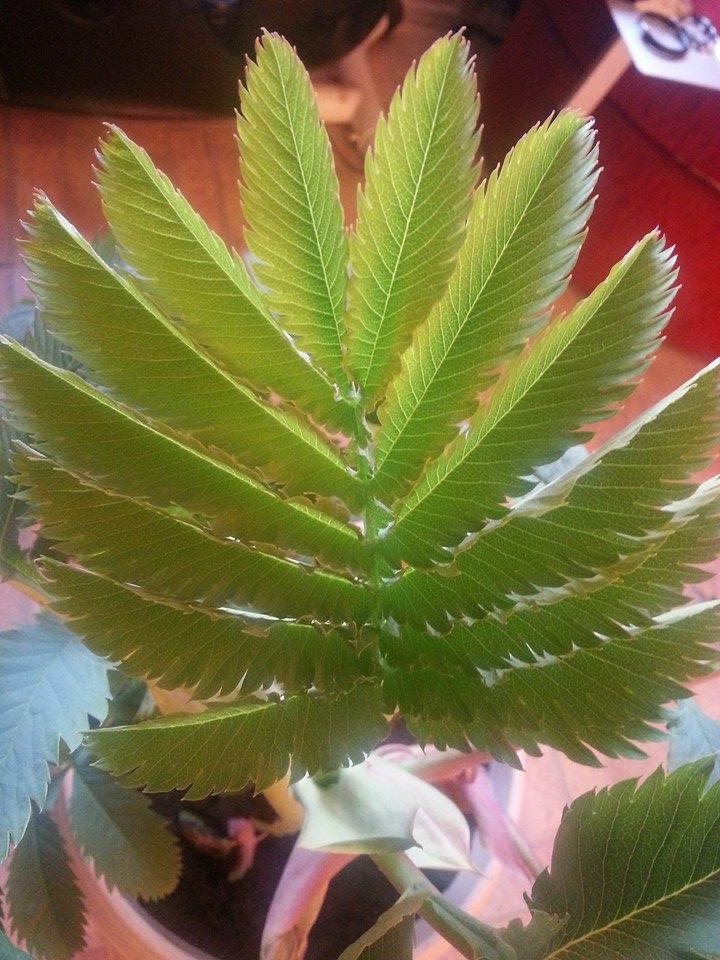
Leaf

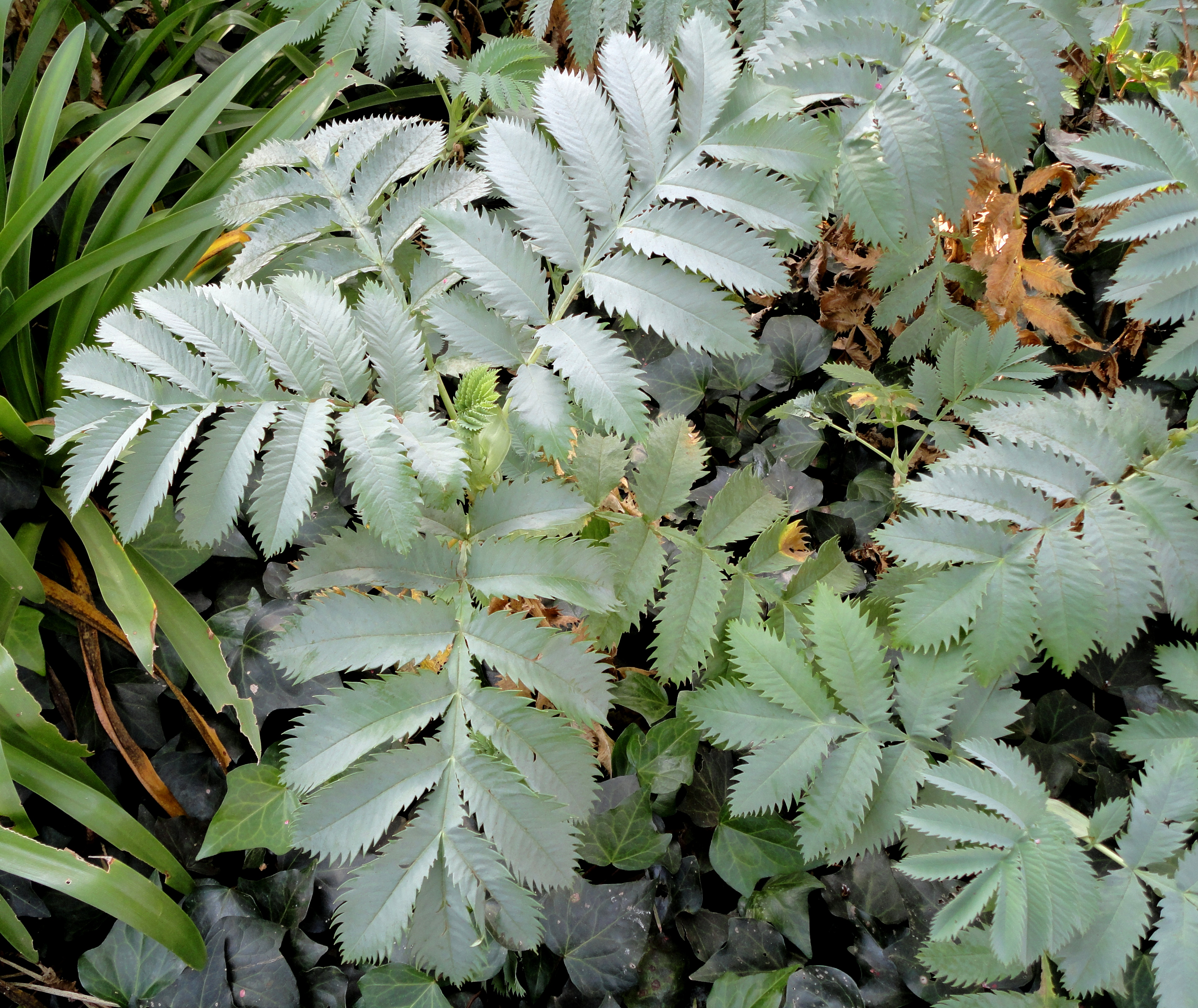
Leaves

== See also ==
- Melianthus comosus, the honey flower
