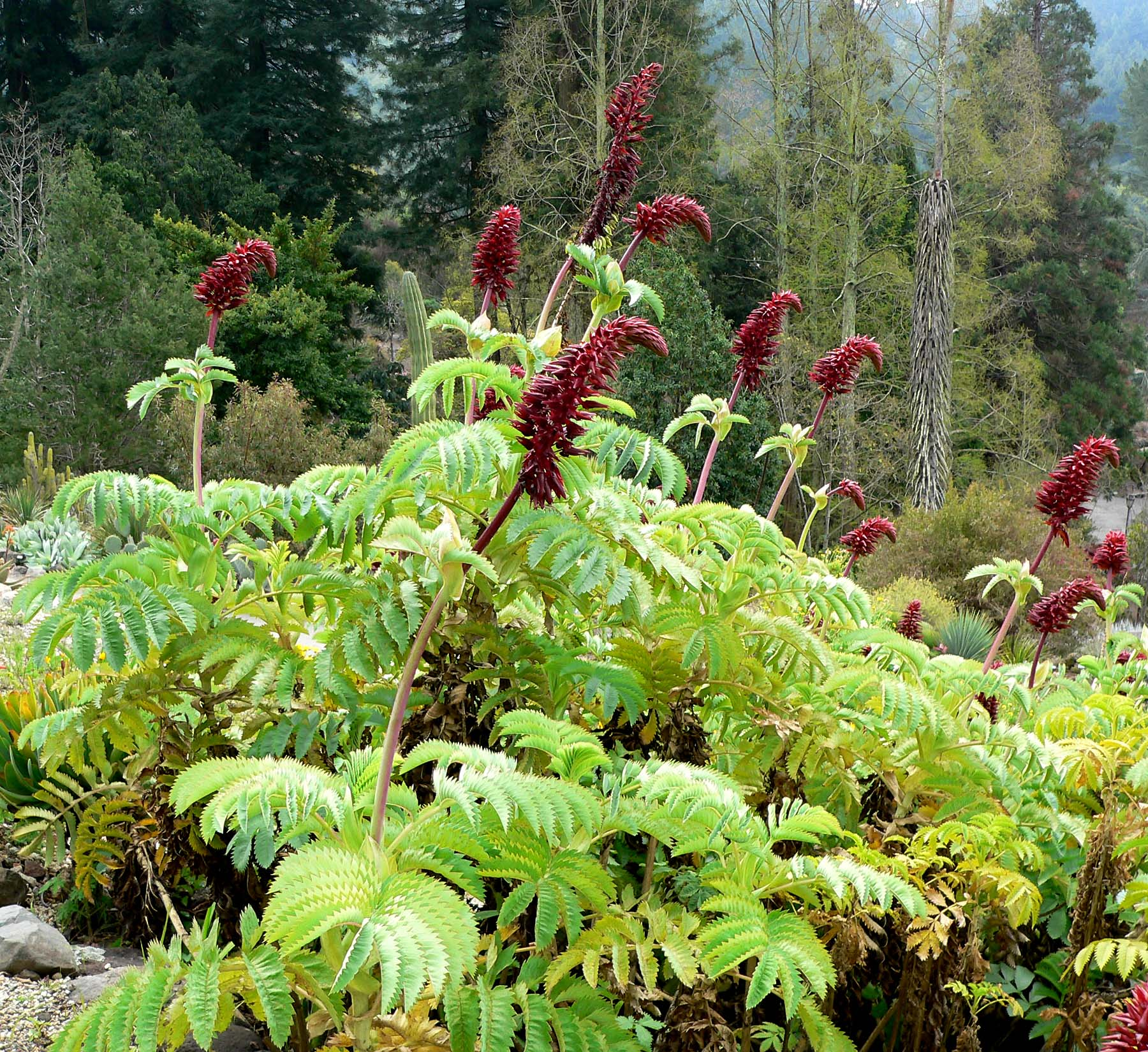
- M. major

Scientific classification
- Kingdom: Plantae
- Clade: Embryophytes
- Clade: Tracheophytes
- Clade: Angiosperms
- Clade: Eudicots
- Clade: Rosids
- Order: Geraniales
- Family: Francoaceae
- Genus: Melianthus; L.

Species
- See text

Synonyms
- Diplerisma Planch.

= Melianthus =

Genus of flowering plants

Melianthus is a genus of flowering plants native to elevated grassland in South Africa, Lesotho, and Namibia. A common name for these plants is honey flower, which is also the English translation of the Latin name. This name also attaches to the species M. comosus and M. major that are found in cultivation.

The genus contains up to six species of evergreen shrubs. They have large pinnate leaves with prominent stipules, and erect racemes of nectar-rich flowers. The vegetative parts are very toxic.

== Species ==
Six species are accepted.

- Melianthus comosus Vahl
- Melianthus dregeanus Sond.
- Melianthus elongatus Wijnands
- Melianthus major L.
- Melianthus pectinatus Harv.
- Melianthus villosus Bolus
