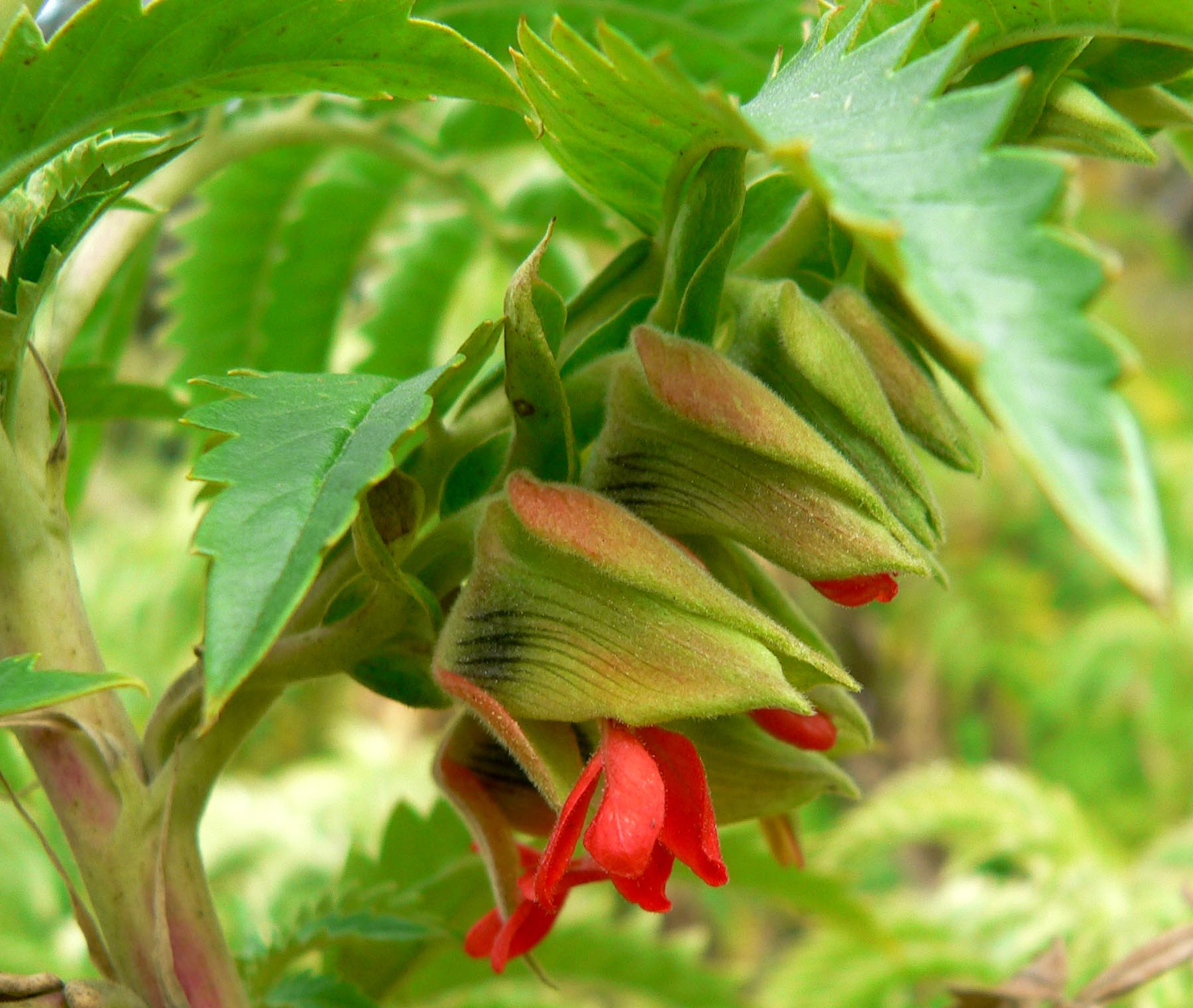

Scientific classification
- Kingdom: Plantae
- Clade: Embryophytes
- Clade: Tracheophytes
- Clade: Angiosperms
- Clade: Eudicots
- Clade: Rosids
- Order: Geraniales
- Family: Francoaceae
- Genus: Melianthus
- Species: M. comosus

Binomial name
- Melianthus comosus Vahl, 1794

Synonyms
- Diplerisma comosum (Vahl) Planch. Melianthus minor L.

= Melianthus comosus =

Honey flower

Species of flowering plant

Melianthus comosus, the honey flower, is a species of flowering plant in the family Francoaceae. It is native to the mostly dry regions of southern Africa. The attractive multi-stemmed shrubs are popular garden subjects. The Afrikaans name kruidjie-roer-my-nie (herb-touch-me-not) alludes to the unpleasant smell that results from bruising of any part of the plant. The vegetative parts are very toxic, as with other Melianthus species, and extracts of the leaves and stem have anti-bacterial properties.

== Range ==
It is native to South Africa, western Lesotho and southern Namibia, where it occurs from 400 to 2,000 m above sea level. In South Africa it occurs in the greater part of the Cape and Free State provinces, and locally in North West, Gauteng and Mpumalanga.

== Flowers ==
The flowers which produce copious black nectar (Note: Also described as dark brown but J. Henning records that black nectar is found in M. comosus, M. elongatus and M. villosus, and brown nectar in the remaining species. See Hansen et al.) are zygomorphic in shape, and green to pale pink in colour. The black nectar is visible through the pale green, semi-transparent sepals. A flower produces an average of 42 μl of nectar a day, with a 10% sugar content, which has been described as a "rich black honey" that almost fills the cup. Vahl's description of the species in 1794 however omitted any mention of the coloured nectar, or its abundance.

== Uses and species associations ==
Honey from its flowers is dark in colour, and apparently not toxic to humans. The flowers are visited by insects and birds, especially sunbirds which eagerly seek them out.
