= Gnophodes grogani =

Scientific classification
- Kingdom: Animalia
- Phylum: Arthropoda
- Clade: Pancrustacea
- Class: Insecta
- Order: Lepidoptera
- Family: Nymphalidae
- Genus: Gnophodes
- Species: G. grogani

Binomial name
- Gnophodes grogani Sharpe, 1901

Species of butterfly

Gnophodes grogani is a butterfly in the family Nymphalidae. It is found in the Democratic Republic of the Congo (from the eastern part of the country to Kivu), western Uganda, and possibly Rwanda and Burundi.

== Original description ==
Gnophodes Grogani, sp. n. Allied to G. parmeno, Doubl. & Hewits., [Gnophodes parmeno Doubleday, (1849)] but at once distinguished by the large dark brand on the primaries.

Primaries. Ground-colour rich brown, with a distinct transverse band of dull ochreous yellow near the apical area; this band broadest on the costal margin and gradually diminishing along the hind margin; a large dark brown brand above the sub-median nervure, extending into the cell. The outline of the wings is more rounded than in G. parmeno, especially as regards the primaries.

Secondaries. Entirely rich brown, with a pale fulvous line indicated along the hind margin. Underside. Very similar to that of G. parmeno, but with the whole aspect of the primaries darker, the lighter bands having a faint shading of mauve; the small spots near the apex yellow.

Secondaries. Much duller than in G. parmeno, the characteristic streak along the costal margin darker; the hindmarginal row of spots yellow instead of white; a distinct shading of mauve apparent on the inner margin.

Expanse 2°9 inches. Hab. Mushari, 8000 feet. June
