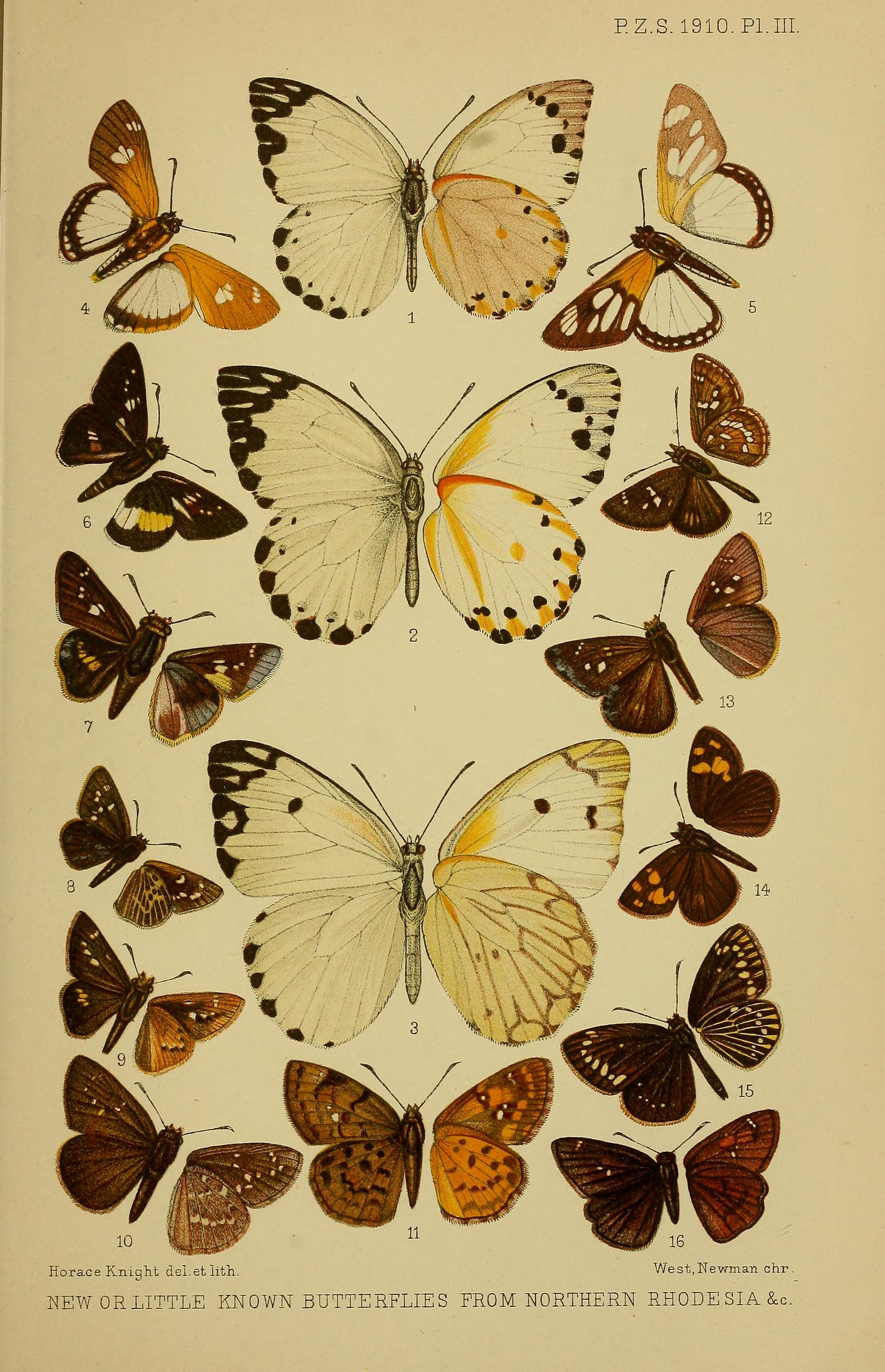

Scientific classification
- Kingdom: Animalia
- Phylum: Arthropoda
- Class: Insecta
- Order: Lepidoptera
- Family: Hesperiidae
- Tribe: Erionotini
- Genus: Tsitana; Evans, 1937

= Tsitana =

Genus of butterflies

Tsitana, commonly called sylphs, is a genus of skippers in the family Hesperiidae are found primarily in Africa. These are small to medium-sized skippers that are primarily unmarked brown of the upperside wings. For other sylphs see genus Metisella.

== Species ==
Listed alphabetically:

- Tsitana dicksoni Evans, 1955 – Dickson's sylph
- Tsitana tsita (Trimen, 1870) – dismal sylph
- Tsitana tulbagha Evans, 1937 – Tulbagh sylph
- Tsitana uitenhaga Evans, 1937 – Uitenhage sylph
- Tsitana wallacei (Neave, 1910) – Wallace's sylph
