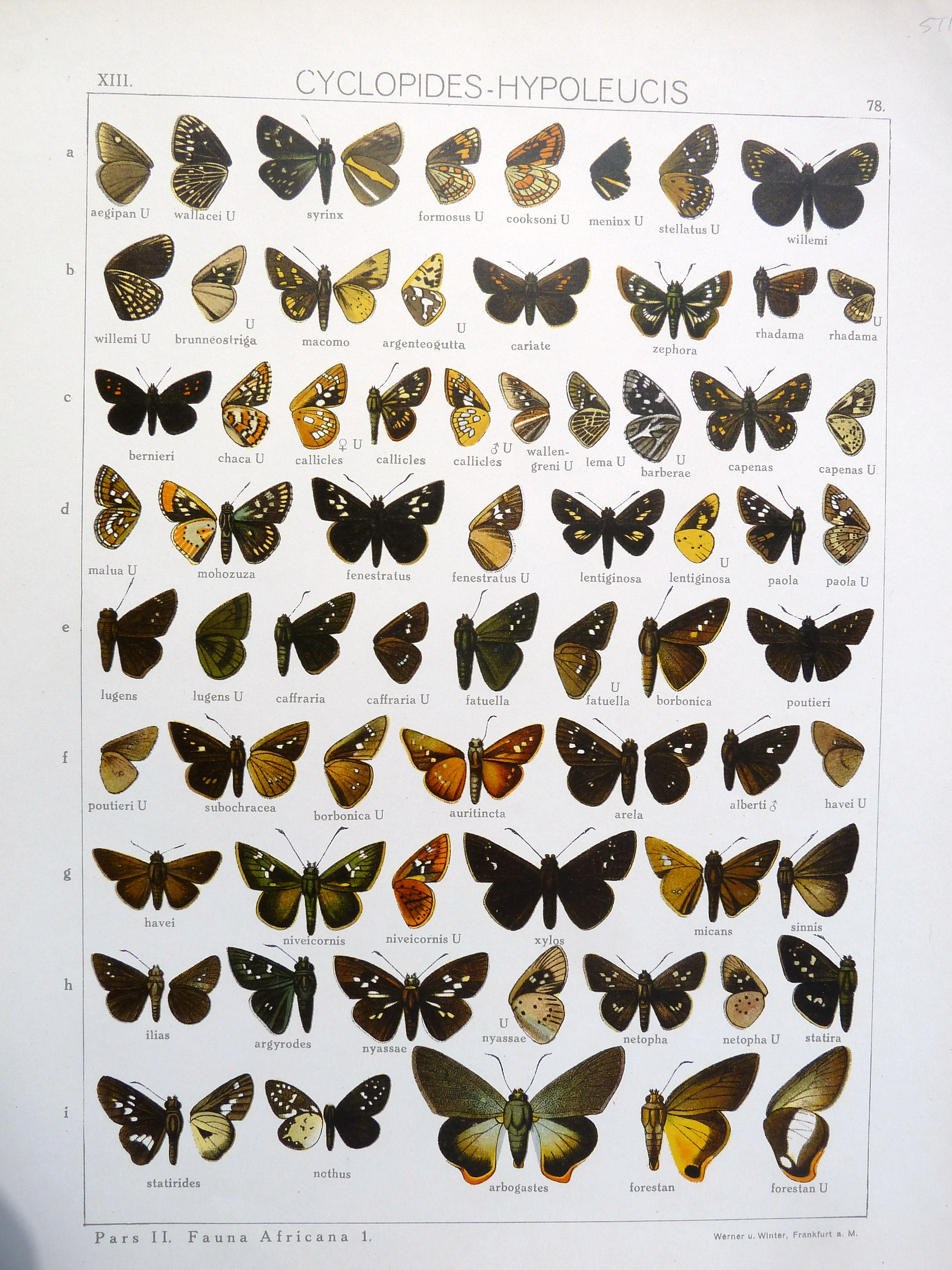
- a

Scientific classification
- Kingdom: Animalia
- Phylum: Arthropoda
- Class: Insecta
- Order: Lepidoptera
- Family: Hesperiidae
- Genus: Metisella
- Species: M. aegipan

Binomial name
- Metisella aegipan (Trimen, 1868)

Synonyms
- Cyclopides aegipan Trimen, 1868

= Metisella aegipan =

Mountain sylph

Species of butterfly

Metisella aegipan, the mountain sylph or Shaka's ranger, is a butterfly of the family Hesperiidae. It is found in the mountains of the Cape in South Africa and in Mozambique, Zimbabwe and Lesotho. The habitat consists of wetlands, marshy places, and grassy gullies in montane grassland.

The wingspan is 28–34 mm for males and 28–36 mm for females.

These small to medium-sized skippers are brown on the upperside and yellow brown on the underside. They have a yellow patch on the upperside forewing.

Their flight period is between December and February with a single brood.

== Subspecies ==
- Metisella aegipan aegipan (South Africa, Lesotho)
- Metisella aegipan inyanga Evans, 1955 (Zimbabwe, Mozambique)
