= Metisella congdoni =

Scientific classification
- Kingdom: Animalia
- Phylum: Arthropoda
- Class: Insecta
- Order: Lepidoptera
- Family: Hesperiidae
- Genus: Metisella
- Species: M. congdoni

Binomial name
- Metisella congdoni de Jong & Kielland, 1983

Species of butterfly

Metisella congdoni is a butterfly in the family Hesperiidae. It was described by de Jong and Kielland in 1983. It is found in southern Tanzania.
