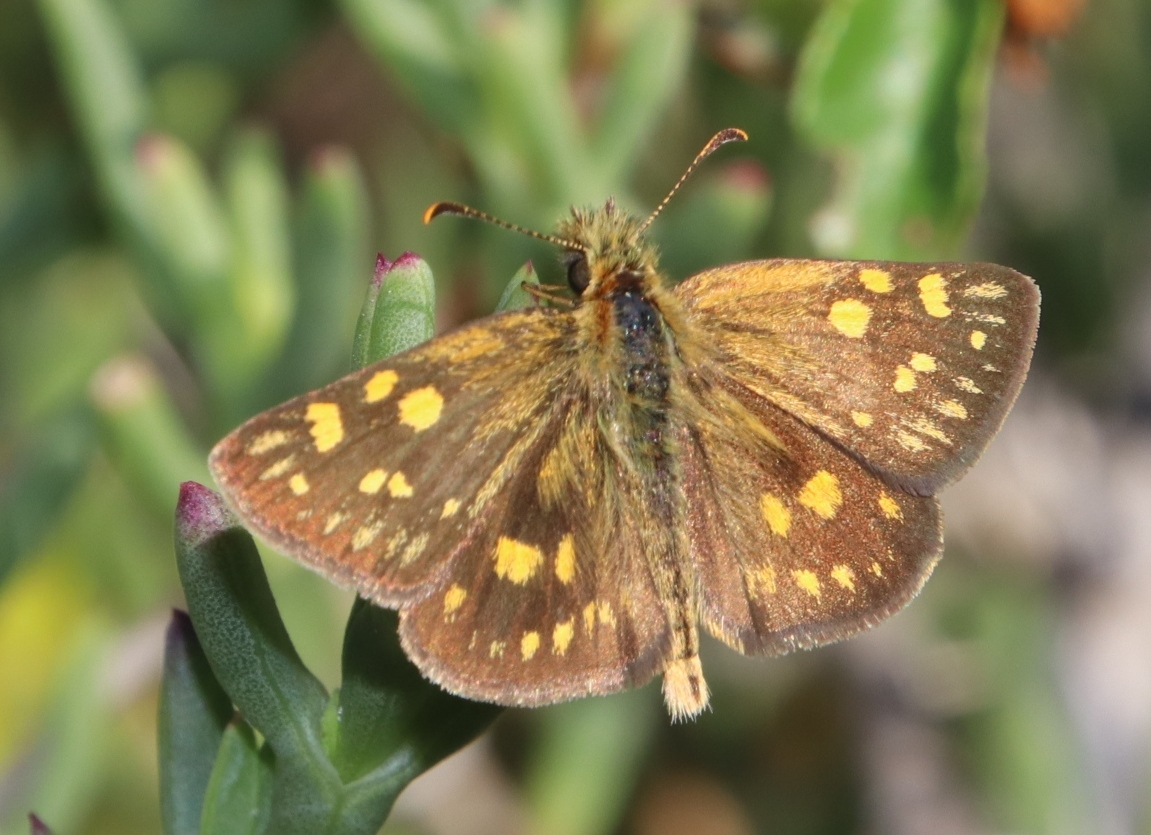
- M. malgacha ssp. malgacha

Scientific classification
- Kingdom: Animalia
- Phylum: Arthropoda
- Class: Insecta
- Order: Lepidoptera
- Family: Hesperiidae
- Genus: Metisella
- Species: M. malgacha

Binomial name
- Metisella malgacha (Boisduval, 1833)

Synonyms
- Steropes malgacha Boisduval, 1833; Cyclopides malgacha

= Metisella malgacha =

Grassveld sylph

Species of butterfly

Metisella malgacha, the grassveld sylph, is a butterfly of the family Hesperiidae. It is found in the Cape, Free State, Lesotho, Transvaal, and KwaZulu-Natal in South Africa. The habitat consists of grassland and grassy areas in the fynbos and Karoo.

The wingspan is 25–29 mm for males and 27–31 mm for females.

Flight period is between August and May with several broods possible or December to January at highest elevations.

The larvae feed on Ehrharta erecta.

== Subspecies ==
- Metisella malgacha malgacha (South Africa: Mpumalanga, North West Province, Gauteng, Free State Province, KwaZulu-Natal, Eastern Cape Province, Western Cape Province, Northern Cape Province)
- Metisella malgacha orina Vári, 1976 (Lesotho, South Africa: Mpumalanga, KwaZulu-Natal – Drakensberg)
