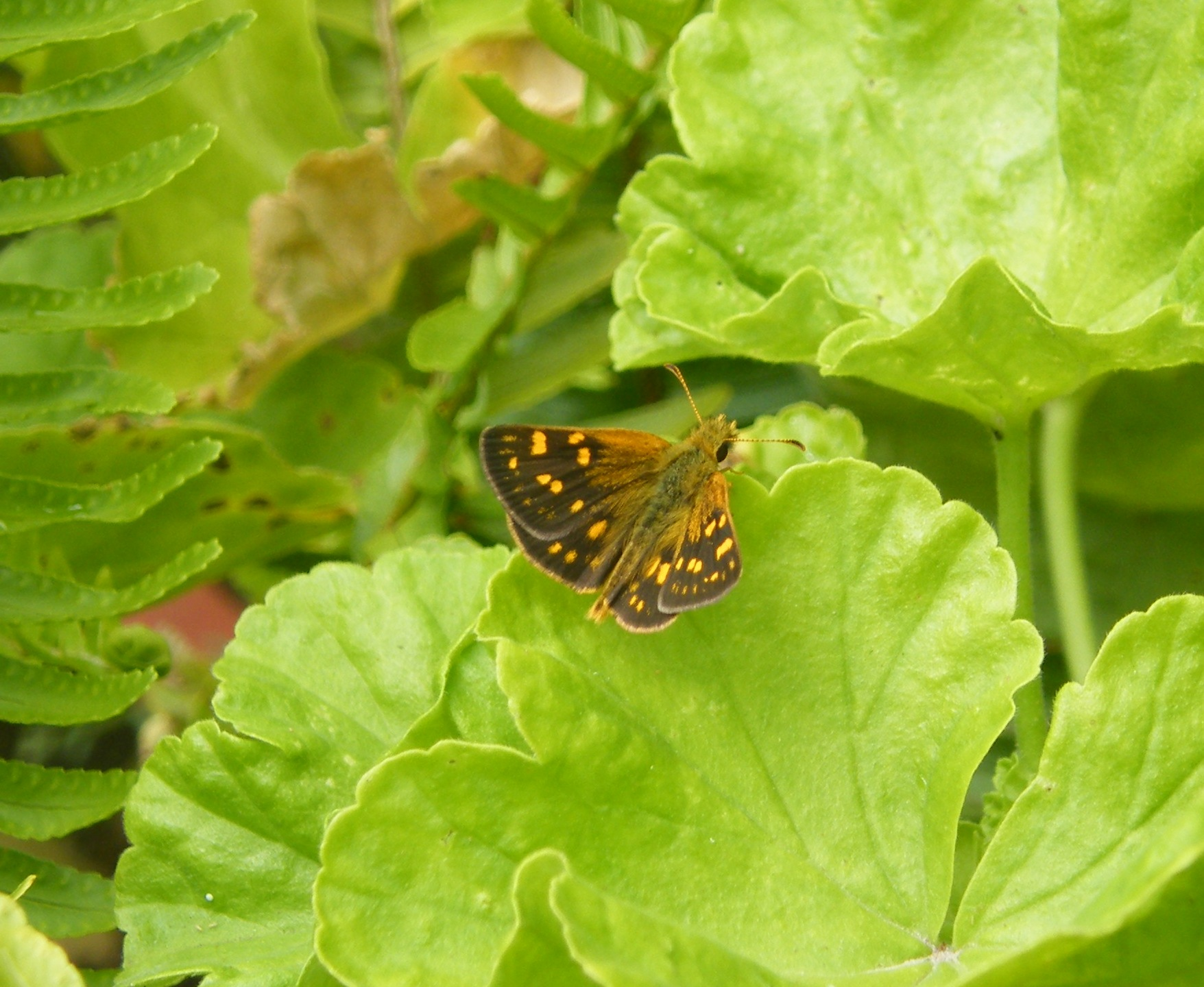
- Female, Cape Town

Scientific classification
- Kingdom: Animalia
- Phylum: Arthropoda
- Class: Insecta
- Order: Lepidoptera
- Family: Hesperiidae
- Genus: Metisella
- Species: M. metis

Binomial name
- Metisella metis (Linnaeus, 1764)

Synonyms
- Papilio metis Linnaeus, 1764; Hesperia metis; Cyclopides metis; Heteropterus metis

= Metisella metis =

Gold spotted sylph

Species of butterfly

Metisella metis, the gold spotted sylph, is a butterfly of the family Hesperiidae. It is found in the Cape and KwaZulu-Natal in South Africa.

The larvae feed on Stenotaphrum glabrum, Panicum deustum, Ehrharta erecta and Stipa dregeana.

== Subspecies ==
- Metisella metis metis (South Africa: Western Cape Province, from the Cape Peninsula, east to the Swellendam district)
- Metisella metis paris Evans, 1937 (Mozambique, Zimbabwe, Eswatini, South Africa: Limpopo Province, Mpumalanga, KwaZulu-Natal, Eastern Cape Province, Western Cape Province)
