= Tsitana uitenhaga =

Scientific classification
- Kingdom: Animalia
- Phylum: Arthropoda
- Class: Insecta
- Order: Lepidoptera
- Family: Hesperiidae
- Genus: Tsitana
- Species: T. uitenhaga

Binomial name
- Tsitana uitenhaga Evans, 1937

Synonyms
- Tsitana tsita uitenhaga Evans, 1937

Species of butterfly

Tsitana uitenhaga, the Uitenhage sylph, is a butterfly of the family Hesperiidae. It is only known from dry grassy scrubland in the Nama Karoo from the Western Cape to the Eastern Cape in South Africa. The habitat consists of grassy areas and riverbeds in hot, dry, scrubby areas in the southern Karoo.

The wingspan is 30–35 mm for males and 31–36 mm for females. Adults are on wing from September to March (with a peak from October to November). There is one extended generation per year.

The larvae feed on Stipa dregeana.
