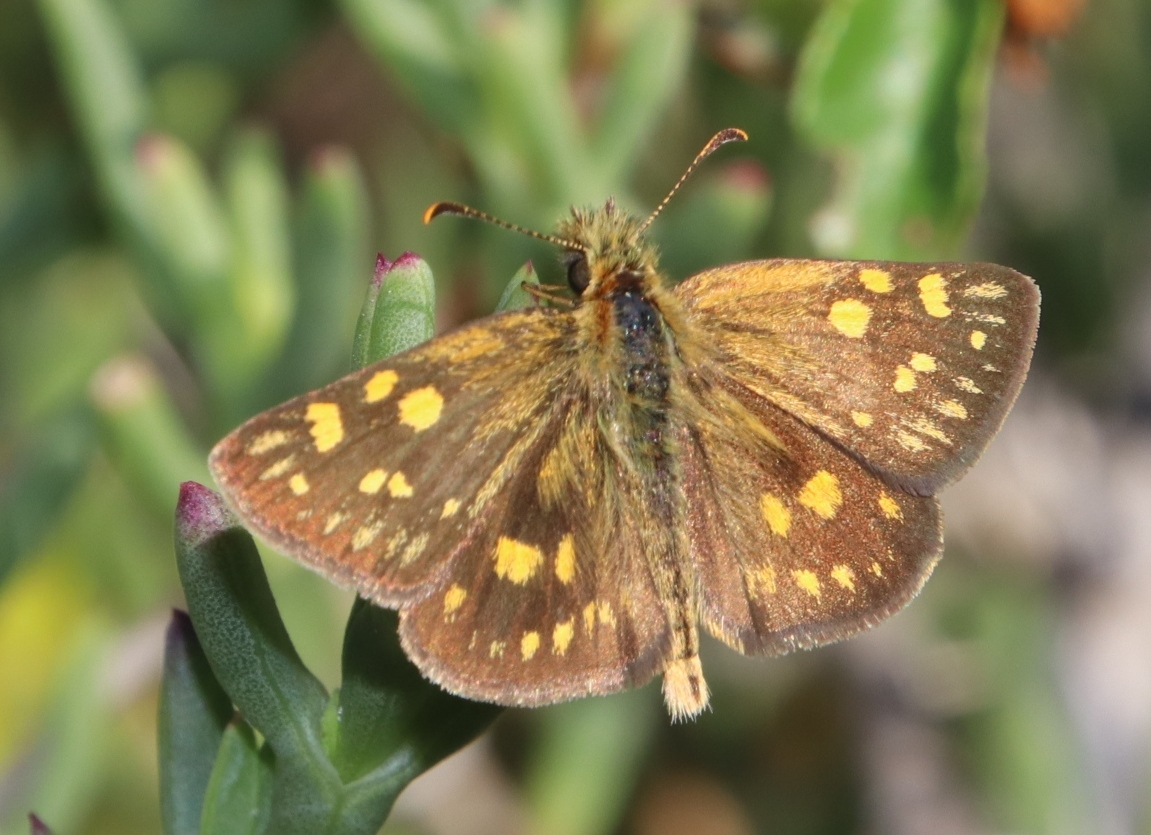
- Metisella malgacha

Scientific classification
- Kingdom: Animalia
- Phylum: Arthropoda
- Clade: Pancrustacea
- Class: Insecta
- Order: Lepidoptera
- Family: Hesperiidae
- Subfamily: Heteropterinae
- Genus: Metisella; Hemming, 1934

= Metisella =

Genus of butterflies

Metisella is a genus of skippers, commonly called sylphs, in the family Hesperiidae found in Africa. For other sylphs see genera Astictopterus, Willema, and Tsitana.

== Species ==
- Metisella abdeli (Krüger, 1928)
- Metisella aegipan (Trimen, 1868) – mountain sylph
- Metisella alticola (Aurivillius, 1925)
- Metisella congdoni de Jong & Kielland, 1983
- Metisella decipiens (Butler, 1896)
- Metisella kakamega de Jong, 1976 – Kakamega sylph
- Metisella kambove (Neave, 1910)
- Metisella malgacha (Boisduval, 1833) – grassveld sylph
- Metisella medea Evans, 1937
- Metisella meninx (Trimen, 1873) – marsh sylph
- Metisella metis (Linnaeus, 1764) – gold spotted sylph
- Metisella midas (Butler, 1894) – Midas sylph
- Metisella quadrisignatus (Butler, 1894) – four-spot sylph
- Metisella syrinx (Trimen, 1868) – bamboo sylph
- Metisella trisignatus (Neave, 1904) – three-spot sylph

=== Former species ===
- Metisella angolana (Karsch, 1896). Transferred to Willema angolana (Karsch, 1896)
- Metisella carsoni (Butler, 1898). Transferred to Willema carsoni (Butler, 1898)
- Metisella formosus (Butler, 1894) – beautiful sylph. Transferred to Willema formosa (Butler, 1894)
- Metisella kumbona Evans, 1937. Transferred to Willema kumbona (Evans, 1937)
- Metisella perexcellens (Butler, 1896). Transferred to Willema perexcellens (Butler, 1896)
- Metisella tsadicus (Aurivillius, 1905). Transferred to Willema tsadica (Aurivillius, 1905)
- Metisella willemi (Wallengren, 1857) – netted sylph. Transferred to Willema willemi (Wallengren, 1857)
