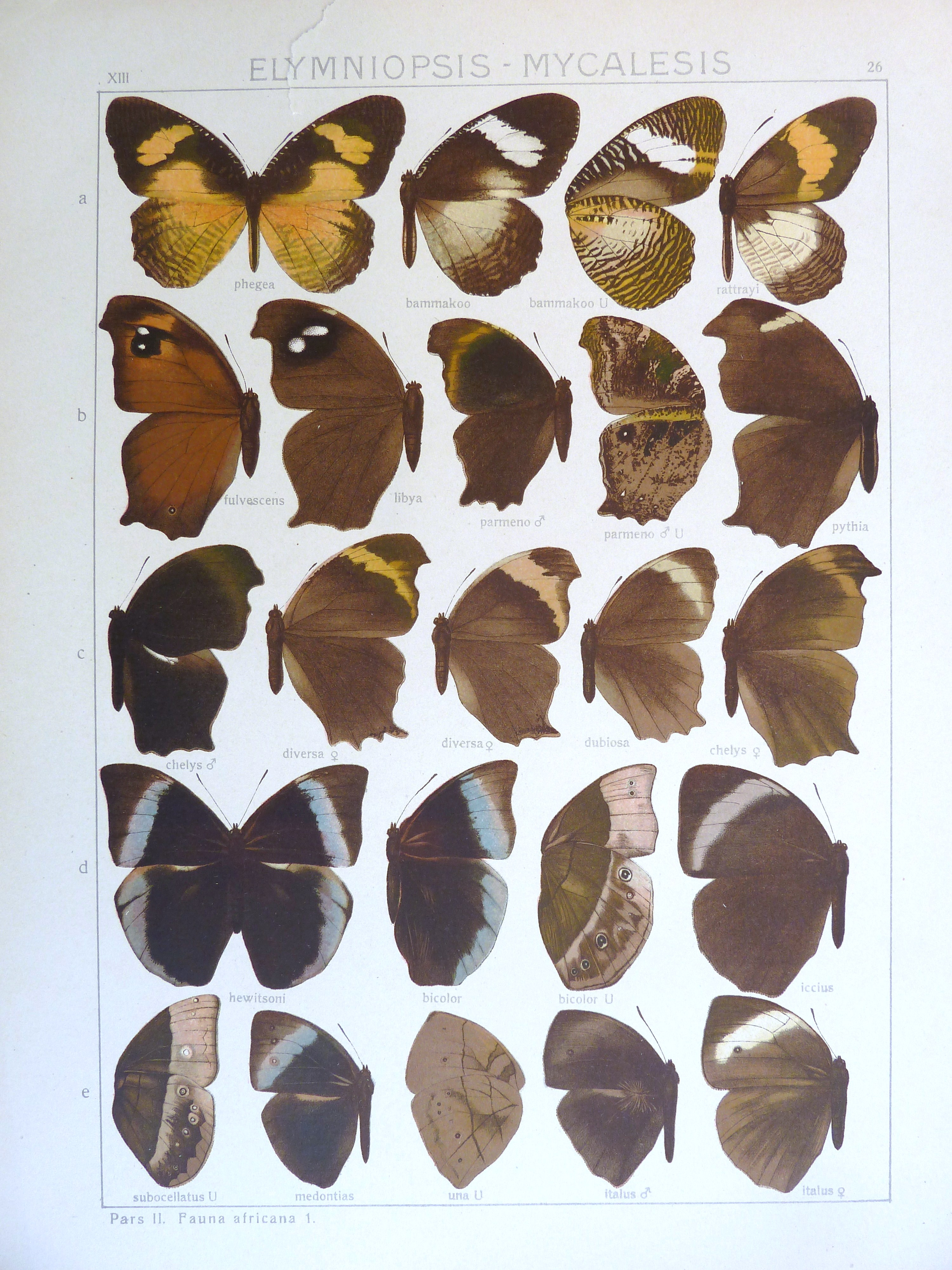
- Gnophodes betsimena

Scientific classification
- Domain: Eukaryota
- Kingdom: Animalia
- Phylum: Arthropoda
- Class: Insecta
- Order: Lepidoptera
- Family: Nymphalidae
- Tribe: Melanitini
- Genus: Gnophodes; Doubleday, [1849]

Diversity
- Three species

= Gnophodes =

Genus of butterflies

Gnophodes is a genus of butterflies from the subfamily Satyrinae in the family Nymphalidae.

== Species ==
- Gnophodes betsimena (Boisduval, 1833) – banded evening brown
- Gnophodes chelys (Fabricius, 1793) – dusky evening brown or lobed evening brown
- Gnophodes grogani Sharpe, 1901
