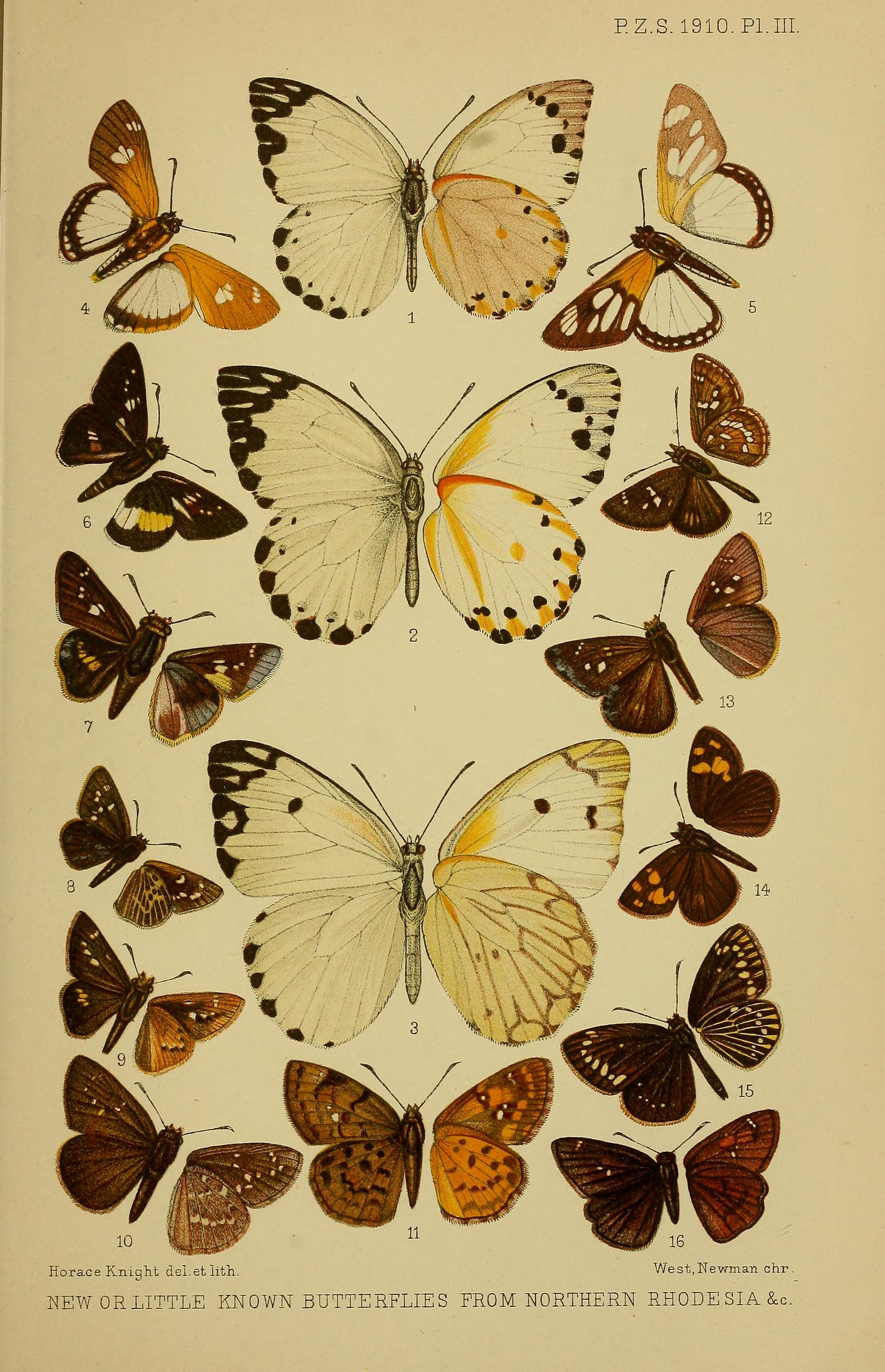
- Tsitana wallacei figure 15

Scientific classification
- Kingdom: Animalia
- Phylum: Arthropoda
- Class: Insecta
- Order: Lepidoptera
- Family: Hesperiidae
- Genus: Tsitana
- Species: T. wallacei

Binomial name
- Tsitana wallacei (Neave, 1910)

Synonyms
- Cyclopides wallacei Neave, 1910

= Tsitana wallacei =

Species of butterfly

Tsitana wallacei, or Wallace's sylph, is a butterfly of the family Hesperiidae. It is found in Africa, including the Democratic Republic of the Congo (Shaba), the Mwinilunga area of north-western Zambia and the Katavi National Park in western Tanzania.

Adults are on wing from January to March.
