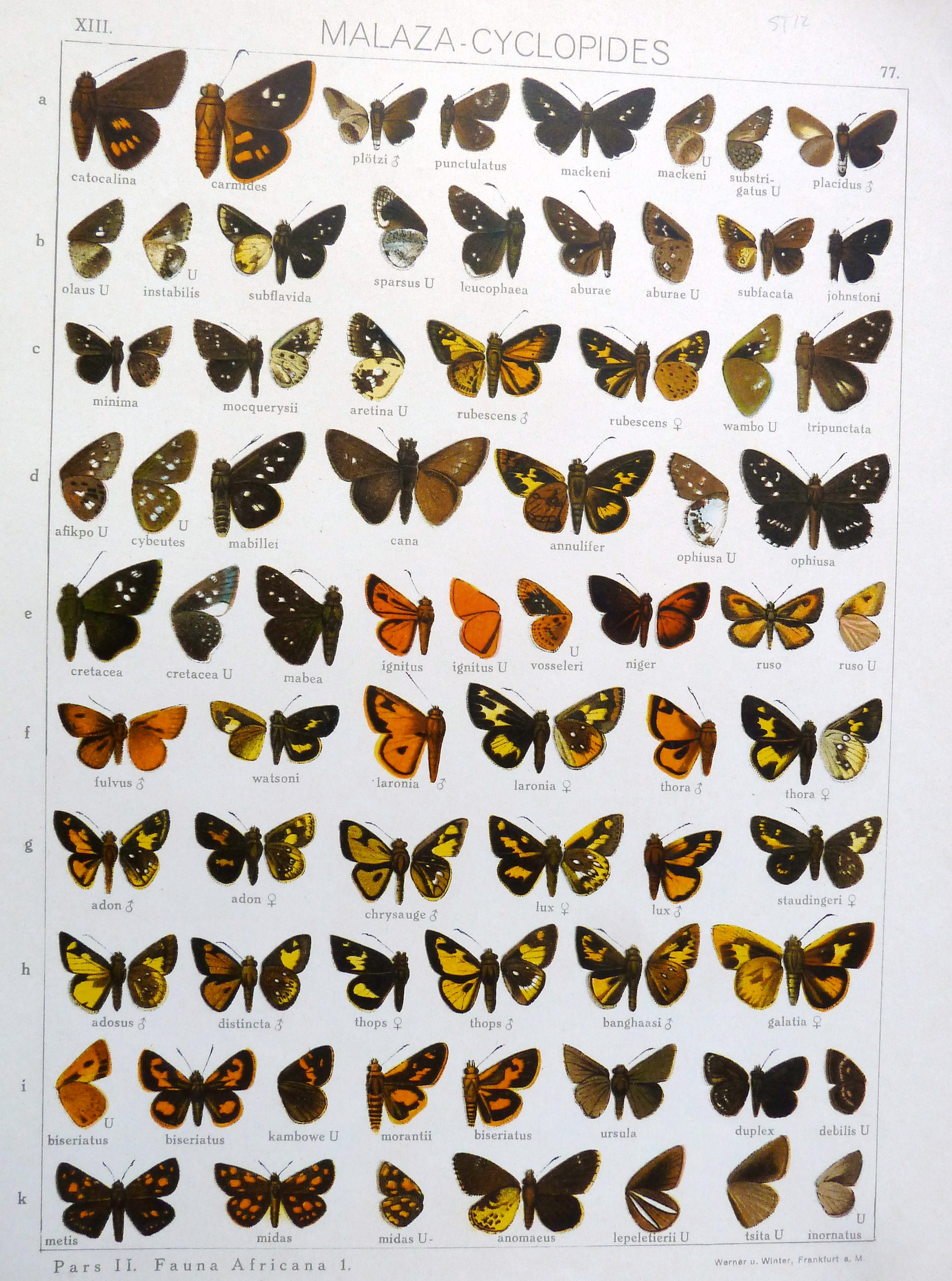
- k

Scientific classification
- Kingdom: Animalia
- Phylum: Arthropoda
- Class: Insecta
- Order: Lepidoptera
- Family: Hesperiidae
- Genus: Tsitana
- Species: T. tsita

Binomial name
- Tsitana tsita (Trimen, 1870)

Synonyms
- Cyclopides tsita Trimen, 1870; Steropes monochromus Mabille, 1891

= Tsitana tsita =

Species of butterfly

Tsitana tsita, the dismal sylph, is a butterfly of the family Hesperiidae. It is found from Winterberg and Amatolas in the eastern Cape along the Drakensberg into Lesotho and KwaZulu-Natal down to sea level from Durban across the midlands to the Tugela, the Free State, the eastern part of the North West Province and Gauteng into the Limpopo Province. It is also present in Zimbabwe. The habitat consists of grassland at altitudes between sea level and 2,600 metres.

The wingspan is 30–38 mm for males and 32–38 mm for females. Adults are on wing from December to March (with a peak in January). There is one generation per year.

The larvae feed on Stipa dregeana.
