= Metisella kakamega =

Scientific classification
- Kingdom: Animalia
- Phylum: Arthropoda
- Class: Insecta
- Order: Lepidoptera
- Family: Hesperiidae
- Genus: Metisella
- Species: M. kakamega

Binomial name
- Metisella kakamega de Jong, 1976

Species of butterfly

Metisella kakamega, the Kakamega sylph, is a butterfly in the family Hesperiidae. It was described by de Jong in 1976. It is found in western Kenya.
