= Metisella alticola =

Scientific classification
- Kingdom: Animalia
- Phylum: Arthropoda
- Clade: Pancrustacea
- Class: Insecta
- Order: Lepidoptera
- Family: Hesperiidae
- Genus: Metisella
- Species: M. alticola

Binomial name
- Metisella alticola (Aurivillius, 1925)

Synonyms
- Cyclopides alticola Aurivillius, 1925

Species of butterfly

Metisella alticola is a butterfly in the family Hesperiidae. It is found in western Uganda, the eastern part of the Democratic Republic of the Congo and Rwanda.
