= Metisella decipiens =

Scientific classification
- Kingdom: Animalia
- Phylum: Arthropoda
- Class: Insecta
- Order: Lepidoptera
- Family: Hesperiidae
- Genus: Metisella
- Species: M. decipiens

Binomial name
- Metisella decipiens (Butler, 1896)

Synonyms
- Heteropterus decipiens Butler, 1896; Cyclopides abscissa Gaede, 1917

Species of butterfly

Metisella decipiens is a butterfly in the family Hesperiidae. It is found in Malawi and southern Tanzania.
