= Metisella trisignatus =

Scientific classification
- Kingdom: Animalia
- Phylum: Arthropoda
- Clade: Pancrustacea
- Class: Insecta
- Order: Lepidoptera
- Family: Hesperiidae
- Genus: Metisella
- Species: M. trisignatus

Binomial name
- Metisella trisignatus (Neave, 1904)

Synonyms
- Cyclopides trisignatus Neave, 1904

Species of butterfly

Metisella trisignatus, the three-spot sylph,' is a butterfly in the family Hesperiidae. It is found in Kenya, Tanzania and Zambia.

== Subspecies ==
- Metisella trisignatus trisignatus (Kenya: highlands west of the Rift Valley)
- Metisella trisignatus tanga Evans, 1937 (highlands of Tanzania, north-eastern Zambia)
