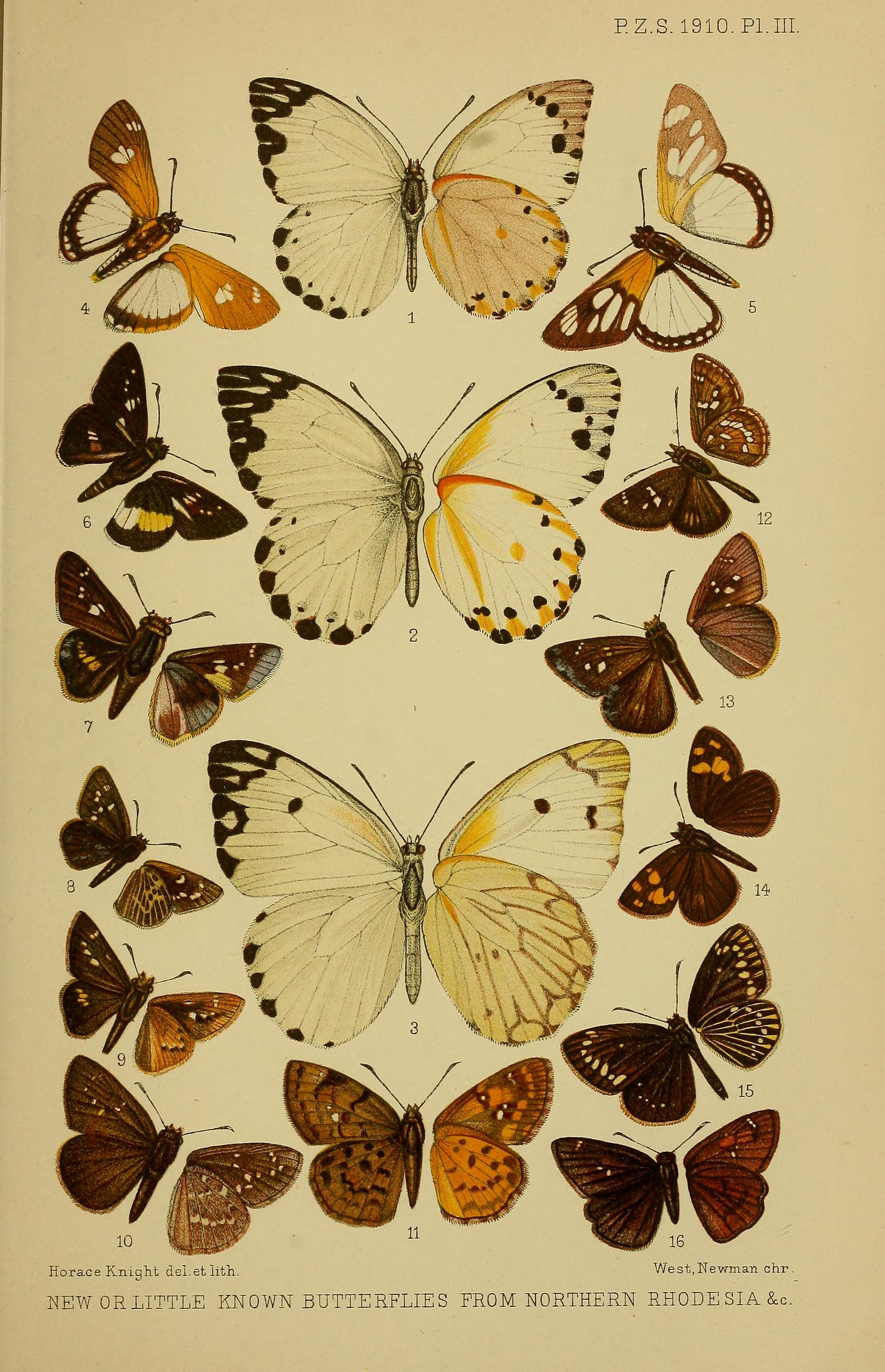
- Metisella kambove figure 14

Scientific classification
- Kingdom: Animalia
- Phylum: Arthropoda
- Class: Insecta
- Order: Lepidoptera
- Family: Hesperiidae
- Genus: Metisella
- Species: M. kambove

Binomial name
- Metisella kambove (Neave, 1910)

Synonyms
- Cyclopides kambove Neave, 1910

= Metisella kambove =

Species of butterfly

Metisella kambove, the Kambove sylph, is a butterfly in the family Hesperiidae. It is found in Nigeria, Cameroon, Tanzania, the Democratic Republic of the Congo and Zambia. The habitat consists of moist Brachystegia woodland.

== Subspecies ==
- Metisella kambove kambove (south-western Tanzania, Democratic Republic of the Congo: Shaba, Zambia: north-west to the Copperbelt)
- Metisella kambove gamma de Jong (Nigeria, Cameroon)
