= Batochloa =

Scientific classification
- Kingdom: Plantae
- Clade: Tracheophytes
- Clade: Angiosperms
- Clade: Monocots
- Clade: Commelinids
- Order: Poales
- Family: Poaceae
- Subfamily: Panicoideae
- Genus: Batochloa; Salariato & Zuloaga
- Species: B. deusta

Binomial name
- Batochloa deusta (Thunb.) Salariato & Zuloaga

Synonyms
- Panicum arundinifolium Schweinf.; Panicum corymbiferum Nees ex Steud.; Panicum deustum Thunb. (1794) (basionym); Panicum deustum var. eburneum Chiov.; Panicum deustum var. hirsutum Peter; Panicum leptocaulon Trin.; Panicum menyharthii Hack.; Panicum pubivaginatum K.Schum.; Panicum unguiculatum Trin.

Genus of grasses

Batochloa is a genus of grasses. It includes a single species, Batochloa deusta, commonly known as broadleaf panicum or rietbuffelgras. It is a tufted or shortly rhizomatous perennial native to Senegal and to eastern and southern Africa from Sudan to South Africa. It grows in forests, deciduous bushland and grassland on argillaceous (heavy clay) or arenaceous (sandy) soils.

Batochloa deusta is a larval food plant for the butterflies banded evening brown (Gnophodes betsimena diversa) and gold spotted sylph (Metisella metis paris).
