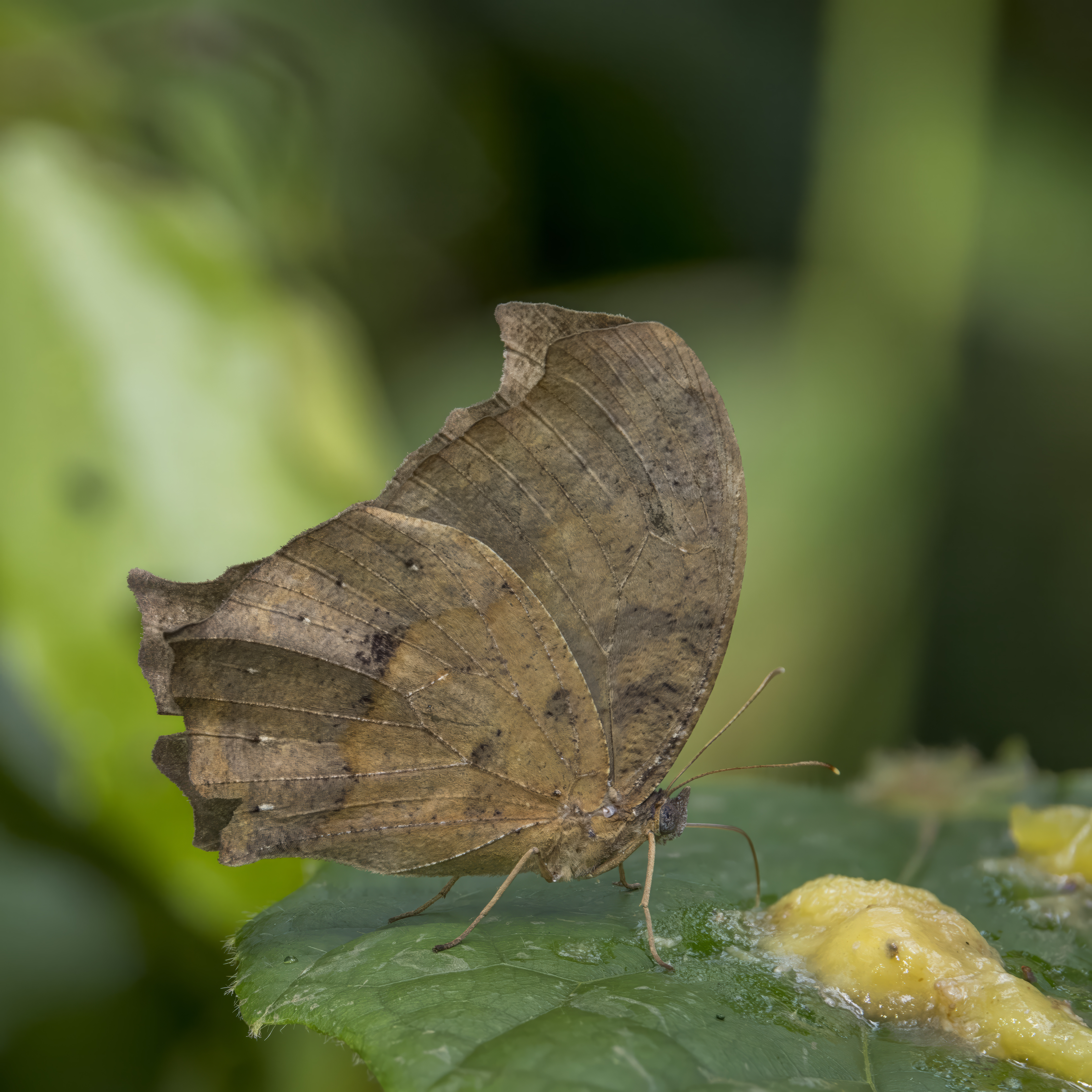
- This image is of Haydonia pythia, previously described as Gnophodes chelys by Larsen

Scientific classification
- Kingdom: Animalia
- Phylum: Arthropoda
- Clade: Pancrustacea
- Class: Insecta
- Order: Lepidoptera
- Family: Nymphalidae
- Genus: Gnophodes
- Species: G. chelys

Binomial name
- Gnophodes chelys (Fabricius, 1793)

Synonyms
- Papilio chelys Fabricius, 1793; Papilio pythia Fabricius, 1793; Gnophodes morpena Westwood, 1851; Melanitis harpa Karsch, 1893; Gnophodes chelys f. iris Bartel, 1905; Gnophodes minchini Heron, 1909; Gnophodes minchini f. magniplaga Heron, 1909; Gnophodes chelys var. elucidata Grünberg, 1910

= Gnophodes chelys =

Species of butterfly

Gnophodes chelys, the dusky evening brown or lobed evening brown, is a butterfly in the family Nymphalidae. It is found in Sierra Leone, Liberia, Ivory Coast, Ghana, Togo, Nigeria, Cameroon, Gabon, the Republic of the Congo, Angola, the Central African Republic, the Democratic Republic of the Congo, Uganda, western Kenya and western Tanzania.The habitat consists of dense forests.

Both sexes are attracted to fermented bananas.

The larvae feed on Setaria (including S. barbatus and S. megaphylla) and Pennisetum species (including P. purpureum), as well as Olyra latifolia, Rottboellia exaltata, Imperata cylindrica, and Streprogyna crinita.

Torben Larsen developed a species numbering system for his 2005 publication Butterflies of West Africa. The species Gnophodes chelys was #657. The 'Larsen' numbers have since been used with permission in A Sharp Eye on Butterflies of Ghana. Larsen #657 is now split between Haydonia harpa and Haydonia pythia.
