= Tsitana tulbagha =

Scientific classification
- Kingdom: Animalia
- Phylum: Arthropoda
- Class: Insecta
- Order: Lepidoptera
- Family: Hesperiidae
- Genus: Tsitana
- Species: T. tulbagha

Binomial name
- Tsitana tulbagha Evans, 1937

Species of butterfly

Tsitana tulbagha, the Tulbagh sylph, is a butterfly of the family Hesperiidae. It is found in South Africa. The habitat consists of grassy, rocky areas in fynbos and Karoo.

The wingspan is 30–40 mm for males and 40–41 mm for females. Adults are on wing from September to December (with a peak from October to November). There is one generation per year.

The larvae feed on Pseudopentameris macrantha, Danthonia and Merxmuellera species.

== Subspecies ==
- Tsitana tulbagha tulbagha (from the western Western Cape mountains to the southern Northern Cape)
- Tsitana tulbagha kaplani Dickson, 1976 (southern and eastern Western Cape mountains to Uitenhage in the Eastern Cape)
