= Tsitana dicksoni =

Scientific classification
- Kingdom: Animalia
- Phylum: Arthropoda
- Clade: Pancrustacea
- Class: Insecta
- Order: Lepidoptera
- Family: Hesperiidae
- Genus: Tsitana
- Species: T. dicksoni

Binomial name
- Tsitana dicksoni Evans, 1955

Species of butterfly

Tsitana dicksoni, the Dickson's sylph, is a butterfly of the family Hesperiidae. It is found in South Africa where it is only known from the Franschhoek Pass and Klein Drakenstein Mountains in the Western Cape and Garcia's and Robinson Pass. The habitat consists of grassy spots in montane fynbos vegetation.

The wingspan is 35–37 mm for males and 40–42 mm for females. Adults are on wing from November to December. There is one generation per year.

The larvae possibly feed on Pseudopentameris macrantha.
