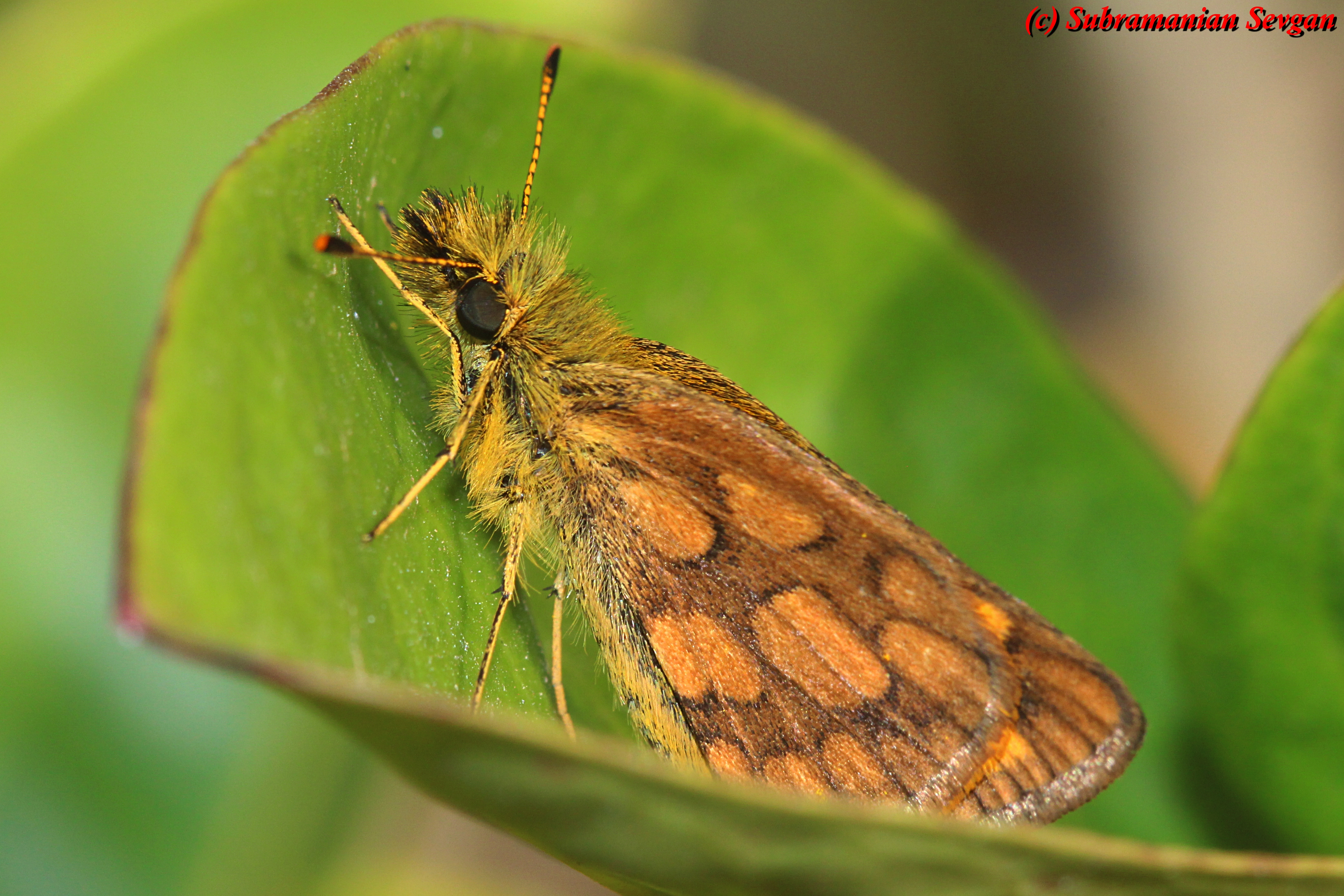

Scientific classification
- Kingdom: Animalia
- Phylum: Arthropoda
- Class: Insecta
- Order: Lepidoptera
- Family: Hesperiidae
- Genus: Metisella
- Species: M. midas

Binomial name
- Metisella midas (Butler, 1894)

Synonyms
- Cyclopides midas Butler, 1894; Cyclopides xanthometis Mabille, 1898

= Metisella midas =

Species of butterfly

Metisella midas, the golden sylph or Midas sylph, is a butterfly in the family Hesperiidae. It is found in Nigeria, Cameroon, Uganda, Kenya, Tanzania, Malawi, Zambia and the Democratic Republic of the Congo. The habitat consists of damp, grassy edges of evergreen forests and grassy areas on the edges of submontane forests.

== Subspecies ==
- Metisella midas midas (Uganda, Kenya, Tanzania, Malawi, Zambia, eastern Democratic Republic of the Congo: including Shaba)
- Metisella midas malda Evans, 1937 (Nigeria: Obudu Plateau, Cameroon)
