= Metisella abdeli =

Scientific classification
- Kingdom: Animalia
- Phylum: Arthropoda
- Class: Insecta
- Order: Lepidoptera
- Family: Hesperiidae
- Genus: Metisella
- Species: M. abdeli

Binomial name
- Metisella abdeli (Krüger, 1928)

Synonyms
- Pamphila abdeli Krüger, 1928; Cyclopides metis f. orientalis Aurivillius, 1925; Metisella orientalis f. alpha Evans, 1937; Metisella orientalis f. beta Evans, 1937; Metisella orientalis f. gamma Evans, 1937; Metisella orientalis f. delta Evans, 1937; Metisella orientalis f. zeta Evans, 1937; Metisella orientalis f. theta Evans, 1937; Metisella orientalis f. kappa Evans, 1937; Metisella orientalis f. lamda Evans, 1937

Species of butterfly

Metisella abdeli, the eastern sylph, is a butterfly in the family Hesperiidae. It is found in Cameroon, the Democratic Republic of the Congo, Uganda, Rwanda, Burundi, Kenya, Tanzania, Zambia, Malawi, Mozambique, Zimbabwe and Eswatini. The habitat consists of forests.

Adults are on wing year round.

== Subspecies ==
- Metisella abdeli abdeli (Cameroon, Democratic Republic of the Congo, Uganda, Rwanda, Burundi, Kenya, Tanzania, north-eastern Zambia, Malawi, Mozambique, eastern Zimbabwe, Eswatini )
- Metisella abdeli elgona Evans, 1938 (near the summit of Mount Elgon in Kenya and Uganda)
