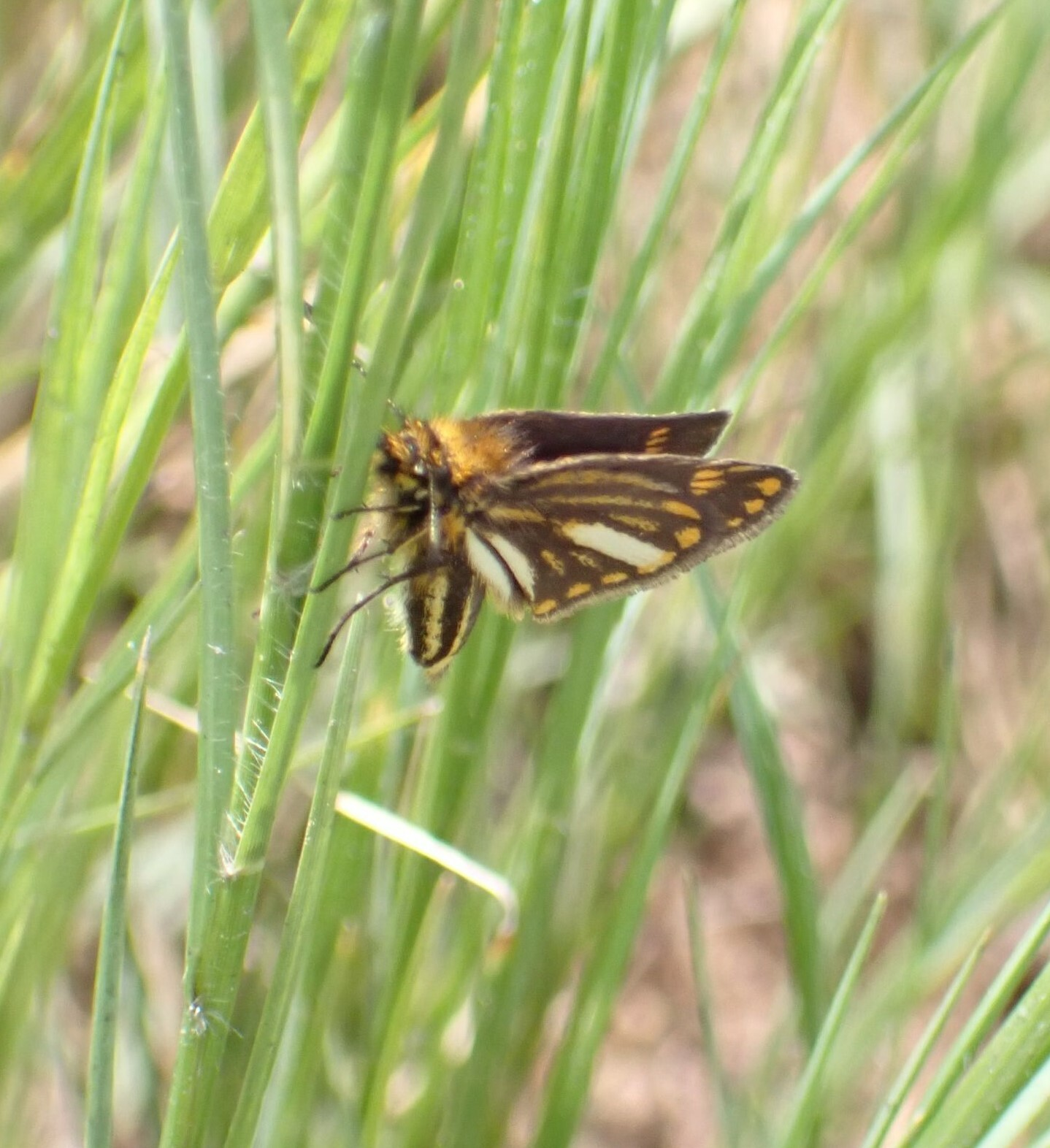
- a

Scientific classification
- Kingdom: Animalia
- Phylum: Arthropoda
- Class: Insecta
- Order: Lepidoptera
- Family: Hesperiidae
- Genus: Metisella
- Species: M. meninx

Binomial name
- Metisella meninx (Trimen, 1873)

Synonyms
- Cyclopides meninx Trimen, 1873; Thymelicus meninx; Cyclopides argentiostriatus Plötz, 1886

= Metisella meninx =

Marsh sylph

Species of butterfly

Metisella meninx, the marsh sylph, is a butterfly of the family Hesperiidae. It is endemic to the wet vleis (shallow lakes) of highland grassland in northern KwaZulu-Natal, Mpumalanga, Gauteng, the northern part of the Free State and the extreme east of the North West Province. It has become extinct in many areas close to Johannesburg due to building developments.

The larvae feed on Poaceae marsh grass species, including Leersia hexandra.
