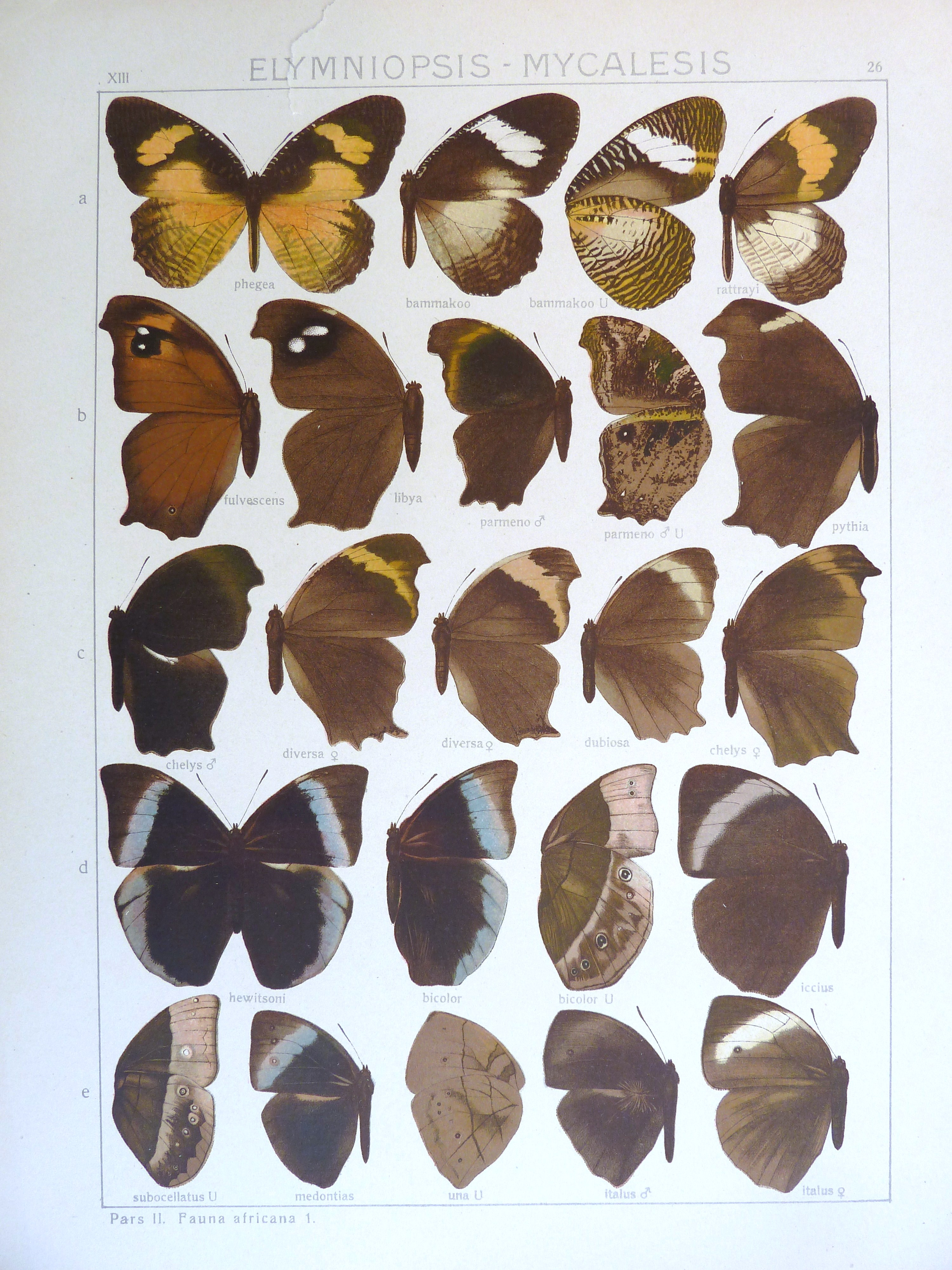
- In Adalbert Seitz's Fauna Africana

Scientific classification
- Kingdom: Animalia
- Phylum: Arthropoda
- Clade: Pancrustacea
- Class: Insecta
- Order: Lepidoptera
- Family: Nymphalidae
- Genus: Gnophodes
- Species: G. betsimena

Binomial name
- Gnophodes betsimena (Boisduval, 1833)

Synonyms
- Cyllo betsimena Boisduval, 1833; Gnophodes parmeno Doubleday, [1849]; Cyllo diversa Butler, 1880; Gnophodes betsimena parmeno f. dubiosa Aurivillius, 1911

= Gnophodes betsimena =

Species of butterfly

Gnophodes betsimena, the banded evening brown, is a butterfly of the family Nymphalidae. It is found in southern Africa.

The wingspan is 55–65 mm for males and 60–70 mm for females. Adults are probably on wing year round, but usually from March to August (with peaks from April to June).

The larvae feed on various grasses, including Ehrharta erecta, Panicum deustum, and Setaria species.

== Subspecies ==
- Gnophodes betsimena betsimena (Madagascar)
- Gnophodes betsimena parmeno Doubleday, [1849] (western Kenya (west of the Rift Valley) to Ethiopia, Uganda, southern Sudan, Zaire, Angola, Cameroon, West Africa)
- Gnophodes betsimena diversa Butler, 1880 (eastern Cape to KwaZulu-Natal, Mozambique, eastern Zimbabwe, Malawi, Tanzania, eastern Kenya, northern Kenya (Mount Marsabit)) - yellow banded evening brown

Torben Larsen developed a species numbering system for his 2005 publication Butterflies of West Africa. The subspecies parmeno was #656. The 'Larsen' numbers have since been used with permission in A Sharp Eye on Butterflies of Ghana. In 2020, the subspecies was elevated to full species status as Gnophodes parmeno but retains the Larsen #656.
