= List of butterflies of Burkina Faso =

Location of Burkina Faso

This is a list of butterflies of Burkina Faso. About 156 species are known from Burkina Faso, none of which are endemic.

== Papilionidae ==
=== Papilioninae ===
==== Papilionini ====
- Papilio nireus Linnaeus, 1758
- Papilio dardanus Brown, 1776
- Papilio demodocus Esper, [1798]
- Papilio horribilis Butler, 1874

==== Leptocercini ====
- Graphium angolanus baronis (Ungemach, 1932)
- Graphium leonidas (Fabricius, 1793)
- Graphium adamastor (Boisduval, 1836)

== Pieridae ==
=== Coliadinae ===
- Eurema brigitta (Stoll, [1780])
- Catopsilia florella (Fabricius, 1775)

=== Pierinae ===
- Colotis antevippe (Boisduval, 1836)
- Colotis aurora evarne (Klug, 1829)
- Colotis celimene sudanicus (Aurivillius, 1905)
- Colotis chrysonome (Klug, 1829)
- Colotis danae eupompe (Klug, 1829)
- Colotis euippe (Linnaeus, 1758)
- Colotis evagore antigone (Boisduval, 1836)
- Colotis vesta amelia (Lucas, 1852)
- Pinacopterix eriphia tritogenia (Klug, 1829)

==== Pierini ====
- Appias epaphia (Cramer, [1779])
- Mylothris chloris (Fabricius, 1775)
- Dixeia doxo (Godart, 1819)
- Dixeia orbona (Geyer, [1837])
- Belenois aurota (Fabricius, 1793)
- Belenois calypso (Drury, 1773)
- Belenois creona (Cramer, [1776])
- Belenois gidica (Godart, 1819)
- Belenois subeida (Felder & Felder, 1865)

== Lycaenidae ==
=== Miletinae ===
==== Miletini ====
- Lachnocnema vuattouxi Libert, 1996

=== Aphnaeinae ===
- Cigaritis avriko (Karsch, 1893)
- Cigaritis nilus (Hewitson, 1865)
- Zeritis neriene Boisduval, 1836
- Axiocerses amanga borealis Aurivillius, 1905
- Aphnaeus brahami Lathy, 1903

=== Theclinae ===
- Myrina subornata Lathy, 1903
- Dapidodigma hymen (Fabricius, 1775)
- Hypolycaena anara Larsen, 1986
- Hypolycaena philippus (Fabricius, 1793)
- Iolaus alienus bicaudatus Aurivillius, 1905
- Iolaus scintillans Aurivillius, 1905
- Iolaus sudanicus Aurivillius, 1905
- Iolaus menas Druce, 1890
- Iolaus ismenias (Klug, 1834)
- Iolaus calisto (Westwood, 1851)
- Stugeta marmoreus (Butler, 1866)
- Pilodeudorix caerulea (Druce, 1890)
- Deudorix antalus (Hopffer, 1855)
- Deudorix dinochares Grose-Smith, 1887
- Deudorix livia (Klug, 1834)
- Deudorix lorisona (Hewitson, 1862)

=== Polyommatinae ===
==== Lycaenesthini ====
- Anthene amarah (Guérin-Méneville, 1849)
- Anthene crawshayi (Butler, 1899)
- Anthene larydas (Cramer, 1780)
- Anthene lunulata (Trimen, 1894)
- Anthene princeps (Butler, 1876)
- Anthene starki Larsen, 2005
- Anthene sylvanus (Drury, 1773)
- Anthene marshalli (Bethune-Baker, 1903)
- Anthene nigeriae (Aurivillius, 1905)
- Anthene phoenicis (Karsch, 1893)

==== Polyommatini ====
- Cupidopsis cissus (Godart, [1824])
- Pseudonacaduba sichela (Wallengren, 1857)
- Lampides boeticus (Linnaeus, 1767)
- Cacyreus lingeus (Stoll, 1782)
- Leptotes brevidentatus (Tite, 1958)
- Leptotes jeanneli (Stempffer, 1935)
- Leptotes pirithous (Linnaeus, 1767)
- Tuxentius cretosus nodieri (Oberthür, 1883)
- Tarucus kiki Larsen, 1976
- Tarucus legrasi Stempffer, 1948
- Tarucus rosacea (Austaut, 1885)
- Tarucus theophrastus (Fabricius, 1793)
- Tarucus ungemachi Stempffer, 1942
- Zizeeria knysna (Trimen, 1862)
- Zizina antanossa (Mabille, 1877)
- Zizula hylax (Fabricius, 1775)
- Azanus jesous (Guérin-Méneville, 1849)
- Azanus mirza (Plötz, 1880)
- Azanus ubaldus (Stoll, 1782)
- Euchrysops malathana (Boisduval, 1833)
- Euchrysops nilotica (Aurivillius, 1904)
- Euchrysops osiris (Hopffer, 1855)
- Euchrysops reducta Hulstaert, 1924
- Euchrysops sahelianus Libert, 2001
- Chilades eleusis (Demaison, 1888)
- Freyeria trochylus (Freyer, [1843])
- Lepidochrysops parsimon (Fabricius, 1775)
- Lepidochrysops victoriae occidentalis Libert & Collins, 2001

== Nymphalidae ==
=== Danainae ===
==== Danaini ====
- Danaus chrysippus alcippus (Cramer, 1777)
- Tirumala petiverana (Doubleday, 1847)
- Amauris tartarea Mabille, 1876
- Amauris damocles (Fabricius, 1793)

=== Satyrinae ===
==== Melanitini ====
- Melanitis leda (Linnaeus, 1758)

==== Satyrini ====
- Bicyclus milyas (Hewitson, 1864)
- Bicyclus pavonis (Butler, 1876)
- Bicyclus sandace (Hewitson, 1877)
- Bicyclus vulgaris (Butler, 1868)
- Ypthima asterope (Klug, 1832)
- Ypthima condamini nigeriae Kielland, 1982
- Ypthimomorpha itonia (Hewitson, 1865)

=== Charaxinae ===
==== Charaxini ====
- Charaxes varanes vologeses (Mabille, 1876)
- Charaxes boueti Feisthamel, 1850
- Charaxes jasius Poulton, 1926
- Charaxes epijasius Reiche, 1850
- Charaxes legeri Plantrou, 1978
- Charaxes castor (Cramer, 1775)
- Charaxes tiridates (Cramer, 1777)
- Charaxes virilis van Someren & Jackson, 1952
- Charaxes viola Butler, 1866
- Charaxes northcotti Rothschild, 1899

=== Nymphalinae ===
==== Nymphalini ====
- Vanessa cardui (Linnaeus, 1758)
- Junonia chorimene (Guérin-Méneville, 1844)
- Junonia hierta cebrene Trimen, 1870
- Junonia oenone (Linnaeus, 1758)
- Junonia orithya madagascariensis Guenée, 1865
- Junonia sophia (Fabricius, 1793)
- Junonia terea (Drury, 1773)
- Precis ceryne ceruana Rothschild & Jordan, 190
- Precis octavia (Cramer, 1777)
- Precis pelarga (Fabricius, 1775)
- Hypolimnas misippus (Linnaeus, 1764)
- Catacroptera cloanthe ligata Rothschild & Jordan, 1903

=== Biblidinae ===
==== Biblidini ====
- Byblia anvatara crameri Aurivillius, 1894
- Byblia ilithyia (Drury, 1773)

==== Epicaliini ====
- Sevenia umbrina (Karsch, 1892)

=== Limenitinae ===
==== Neptidini ====
- Neptis kiriakoffi Overlaet, 1955
- Neptis nemetes Hewitson, 1868

==== Adoliadini ====
- Hamanumida daedalus (Fabricius, 1775)
- Euphaedra laguerrei Hecq, 1979

=== Heliconiinae ===
==== Acraeini ====
- Acraea camaena (Drury, 1773)
- Acraea neobule Doubleday, 1847
- Acraea quirina (Fabricius, 1781)
- Acraea zetes (Linnaeus, 1758)
- Acraea egina (Cramer, 1775)
- Acraea caecilia (Fabricius, 1781)
- Acraea pseudegina Westwood, 1852
- Acraea vestalis Felder & Felder, 1865
- Acraea encedana Pierre, 1976
- Acraea encedon (Linnaeus, 1758)
- Acraea serena (Fabricius, 1775)

==== Vagrantini ====
- Phalanta phalantha aethiopica (Rothschild & Jordan, 1903)

== Hesperiidae ==
=== Coeliadinae ===
- Coeliades aeschylus (Plötz, 1884)
- Coeliades forestan (Stoll, [1782])
- Coeliades pisistratus (Fabricius, 1793)

=== Pyrginae ===
==== Tagiadini ====
- Tagiades flesus (Fabricius, 1781)
- Caprona adelica Karsch, 1892
- Abantis nigeriana Butler, 1901

==== Carcharodini ====
- Spialia dromus (Plötz, 1884)
- Spialia spio (Linnaeus, 1764)
- Gomalia elma (Trimen, 1862)

=== Hesperiinae ===
==== Aeromachini ====
- Prosopalpus styla Evans, 1937
- Pardaleodes incerta murcia (Plötz, 1883)
- Platylesches moritili (Wallengren, 1857)

==== Baorini ====
- Pelopidas mathias (Fabricius, 1798)
- Borbo gemella (Mabille, 1884)
- Parnara monasi (Trimen & Bowker, 1889)
- Gegenes hottentota (Latreille, 1824)
- Gegenes pumilio gambica (Mabille, 1878)

== See also ==
- Geography of Burkina Faso
- Guinean forest-savanna mosaic
