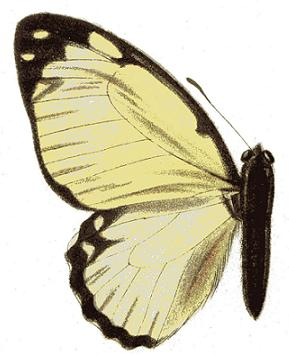

Conservation status
- Endangered (IUCN 2.3)

Scientific classification
- Kingdom: Animalia
- Phylum: Arthropoda
- Clade: Pancrustacea
- Class: Insecta
- Order: Lepidoptera
- Family: Papilionidae
- Genus: Graphium
- Species: G. levassori

Binomial name
- Graphium levassori (Oberthür, 1890)

Synonyms
- Papilio levassori Oberthür, 1886

= Graphium levassori =

Species of butterfly

Graphium levassori, the yellow lady, is a species of butterfly in the family Papilionidae. It is endemic to the Comoros.

== Description ==
The greater part of the wings above is yellowish white, but the following parts are black: the costal margin of the forewing as far as the cell and on the hindwing the apex, which is adorned with two light spots in cellules 7 and 8, and a marginal line, only 1 mm broad between vein 5 and the hinder angle, which is somewhat widened at the apical angle and there encloses two light spots. — Great Comoro.

== Taxonomy ==
It is a member of the leonidas-group of closely species (Graphium leonidas, Graphium levassori, Graphium cyrnus).

== Sources ==
- IUCN Red List of all current Threatened Species
