= Abantis arctomarginata =

Scientific classification
- Domain: Eukaryota
- Kingdom: Animalia
- Phylum: Arthropoda
- Class: Insecta
- Order: Lepidoptera
- Family: Hesperiidae
- Genus: Abantis
- Species: A. arctomarginata

Binomial name
- Abantis arctomarginata Lathy, 1901

Synonyms
- Abantis bismarcki arctomarginata

Species of butterfly

Abantis arctomarginata, the tricoloured paradise skipper, is a butterfly in the family Hesperiidae. It is found in Tanzania (from the south-central part of the country to Iringa) and Malawi.

The larvae feed on Uapaca kirkiana.
