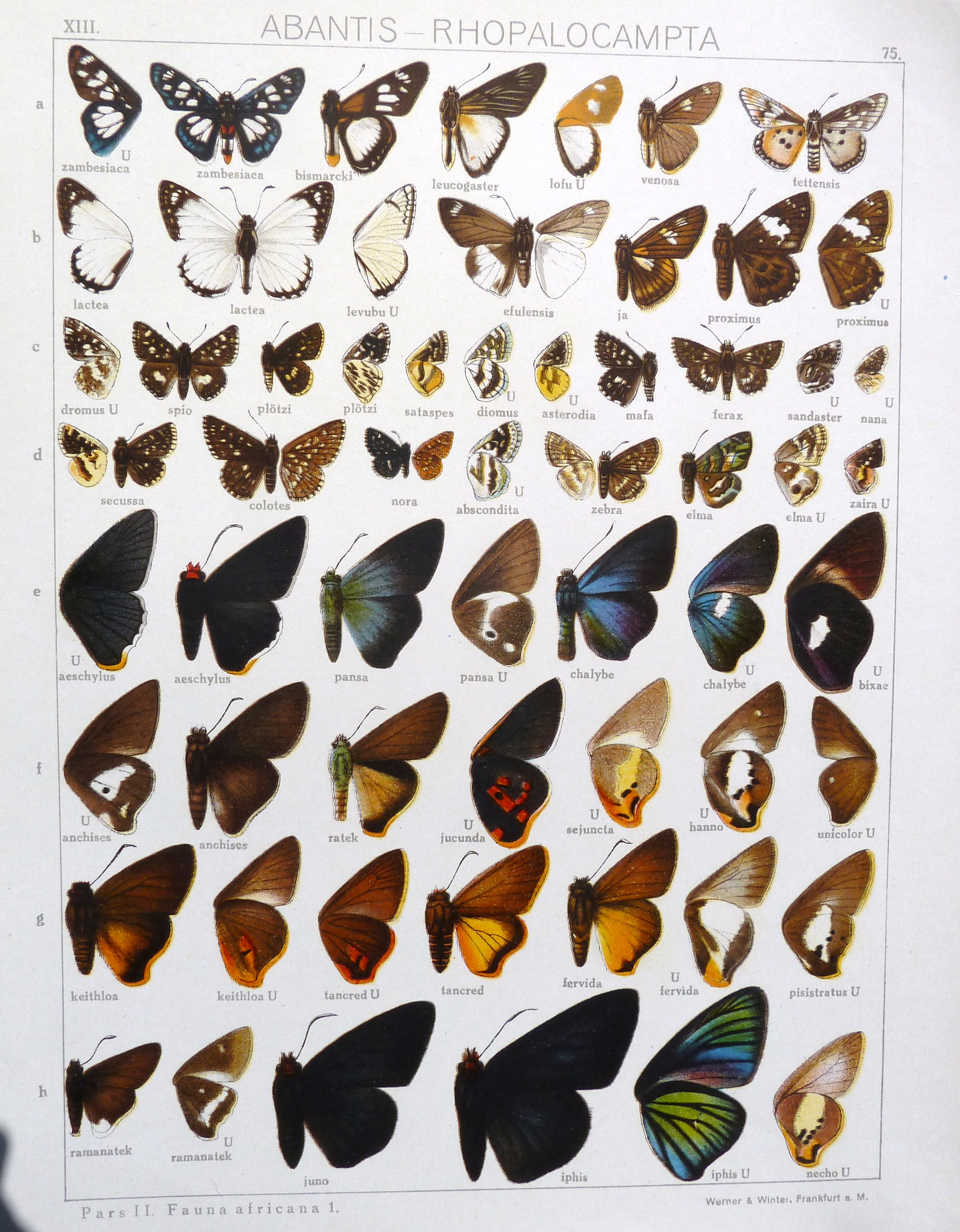

Scientific classification
- Kingdom: Animalia
- Phylum: Arthropoda
- Clade: Pancrustacea
- Class: Insecta
- Order: Lepidoptera
- Family: Hesperiidae
- Genus: Abantis
- Species: A. leucogaster

Binomial name
- Abantis leucogaster (Mabille, 1890)

Synonyms
- Sapaea leucogaster Mabille, 1890

= Abantis leucogaster =

Streaked paradise skipper

Species of butterfly

Abantis leucogaster, the streaked paradise skipper, is a butterfly in the family Hesperiidae. It is found in Guinea, Sierra Leone, Ivory Coast, Ghana, Nigeria, Cameroon, the Republic of the Congo, the Central African Republic, the Democratic Republic of the Congo, Uganda and Tanzania. The habitat consists of primary forests and well-developed secondary forests.

Adults have been recorded feeding from flowers.

== Subspecies ==
- Abantis leucogaster leucogaster (Guinea, Sierra Leone, Ivory Coast, Ghana, Nigeria, Cameroon, Congo, Central African Republic, Democratic Republic of Congo)
- Abantis leucogaster iruma Evans, 1951 (eastern Democratic Republic of Congo, western Uganda, north-western Tanzania)
