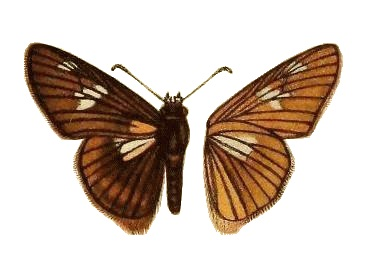

Scientific classification
- Domain: Eukaryota
- Kingdom: Animalia
- Phylum: Arthropoda
- Class: Insecta
- Order: Lepidoptera
- Family: Hesperiidae
- Genus: Abantis
- Species: A. ja

Binomial name
- Abantis ja H. H. Druce, 1909

= Abantis ja =

Djah paradise skipper

Species of butterfly

Abantis ja, the Djah paradise skipper, is a butterfly in the family Hesperiidae. The species was first described by Hamilton Herbert Druce in 1909. It is found in Ivory Coast, Ghana, Cameroon, the Republic of the Congo and the Central African Republic. The habitat consists of forests.
