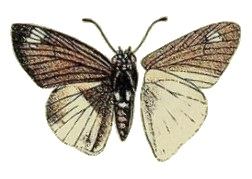

Scientific classification
- Domain: Eukaryota
- Kingdom: Animalia
- Phylum: Arthropoda
- Class: Insecta
- Order: Lepidoptera
- Family: Hesperiidae
- Genus: Abantis
- Species: A. efulensis

Binomial name
- Abantis efulensis Holland, 1896

= Abantis efulensis =

White-banded paradise skipper

Species of butterfly

Abantis efulensis is a butterfly in the family Hesperiidae. It is found in Cameroon, the Republic of the Congo, the Democratic Republic of the Congo and Uganda (from the south-west to the Kigezi District).
