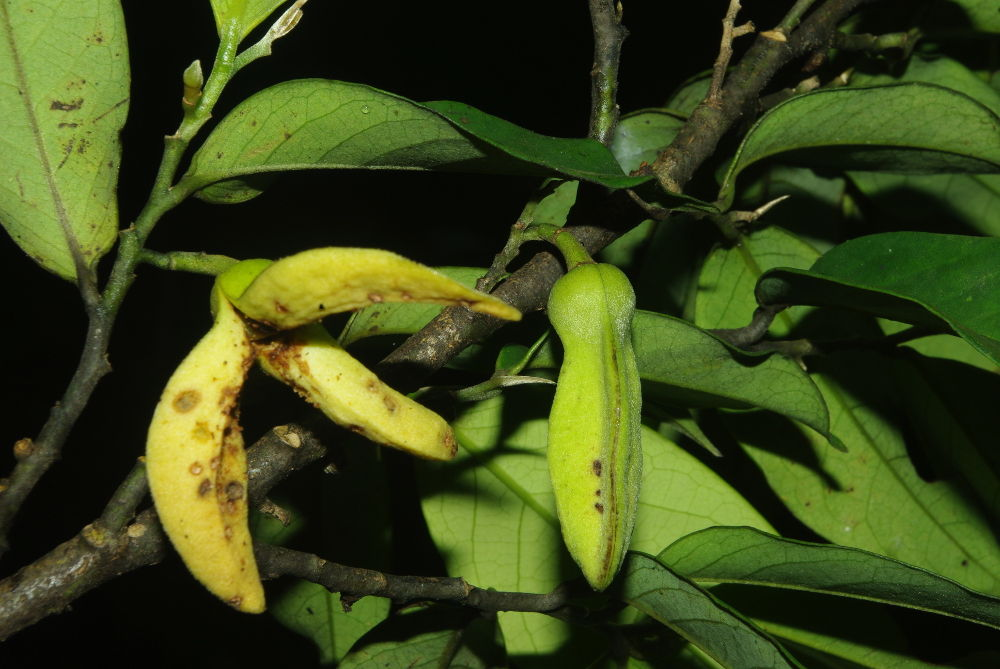
- Annickia affinis

Scientific classification
- Kingdom: Plantae
- Clade: Tracheophytes
- Clade: Angiosperms
- Clade: Magnoliids
- Order: Magnoliales
- Family: Annonaceae
- Subfamily: Malmeoideae
- Genus: Annickia; Setten & Maas

Synonyms
- Enantia Oliv.

= Annickia =

Genus of flowering plants

Annickia is a genus of plant in family Annonaceae. Every species of this genus is native to continental Africa, from west Tropical Africa to Tanzania.

== Species ==
As accepted by Kew;

- Annickia affinis (Exell) Versteegh & Sosef
- Annickia ambigua (Robyns & Ghesq.) Setten & Maas
- Annickia atrocyanescens (Robyns & Ghesq.) Setten & Maas
- Annickia chlorantha (Oliv.) Setten & Maas
- Annickia kummeriae (Engl. & Diels) Setten & Maas
- Annickia kwiluensis (Robyns & Ghesq.) Setten & Maas
- Annickia lebrunii (Robyns & Ghesq.) Setten & Maas
- Annickia letestui (Le Thomas) Setten & Maas
- Annickia olivacea (Robyns & Ghesq.) Setten & Maas
- Annickia pilosa (Exell) Setten & Maas
- Annickia polycarpa (DC.) Setten & Maas ex I.M.Turner

A revision of the genus Annickia was carried out in 2007.
