= Abantis elegantula =

Scientific classification
- Kingdom: Animalia
- Phylum: Arthropoda
- Clade: Pancrustacea
- Class: Insecta
- Order: Lepidoptera
- Family: Hesperiidae
- Genus: Abantis
- Species: A. elegantula

Binomial name
- Abantis elegantula (Mabille, 1890)

Synonyms
- Sapaea elegantula Mabille, 1890; Abantis maesseni Miller, 1971

Species of butterfly

Abantis elegantula, the elegant paradise skipper, is a butterfly in the family Hesperiidae. It is found in Guinea, Burkina Faso, Sierra Leone, Ivory Coast, Ghana, Nigeria and Cameroon. The habitat consists of forests, including forest-savanna mosaic.

Adult males mud-puddle.

Torben Larsen developed a species numbering system for his 2005 publication Butterflies of West Africa. This species is #1261. The 'Larsen' numbers have since been used with permission in A Sharp Eye on Butterflies of Ghana.
