= Annickia kummerae =

Conservation status
- Vulnerable (IUCN 2.3)

Scientific classification
- Kingdom: Plantae
- Clade: Tracheophytes
- Clade: Angiosperms
- Clade: Magnoliids
- Order: Magnoliales
- Family: Annonaceae
- Genus: Annickia
- Species: A. kummerae

Binomial name
- Annickia kummerae (Engl. & Diels) Setten & Maas

Synonyms
- Enantia kummerae Engl. & Diels

Species of flowering plant

Annickia kummerae is a species of flowering plant in the Annonaceae family. It is a tree endemic to the Usambara Mountains of northeastern Tanzania. It grows 25 to 30 metres tall in submontane rain forest from 850 to 1,100 metres elevation. The species' native forests are suffering severe declines because of the use of the area for agriculture and gold mining.
