= Abantis eltringhami =

Scientific classification
- Kingdom: Animalia
- Phylum: Arthropoda
- Clade: Pancrustacea
- Class: Insecta
- Order: Lepidoptera
- Family: Hesperiidae
- Genus: Abantis
- Species: A. eltringhami

Binomial name
- Abantis eltringhami Jordan, 1932

Species of butterfly

Abantis eltringhami is a butterfly in the family Hesperiidae. It is found in Cameroon.
