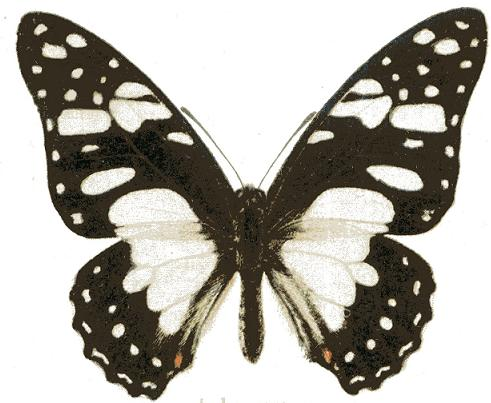

Scientific classification
- Kingdom: Animalia
- Phylum: Arthropoda
- Clade: Pancrustacea
- Class: Insecta
- Order: Lepidoptera
- Family: Papilionidae
- Genus: Graphium
- Species: G. taboranus

Binomial name
- Graphium taboranus (Oberthür, 1886)

Synonyms
- Papilio taboranus Oberthür, 1886; Graphium (Arisbe) taboranus; Papilio nivinox Butler, 1894

= Graphium taboranus =

Species of butterfly

Graphium taboranus is a butterfly in the family Papilionidae. It is found in Angola, the Democratic Republic of Congo, Tanzania, Malawi, and northern Zambia. The habitat consists of woodland.

== Description ==
Diagnostic.The markings of the upper surface snow-white; the discal band in cellule 2 of the forewing is smaller, not reaching the base of the cellule and is quite free; the white subdiscal spots of the hindwing above are almost in the middle of the marginal band. Nyassaland and German East Africa. External images from Royal Museum of Central Africa.

== Biology ==
The larvae feed on Annona species.

== Taxonomy ==
Graphium taboranus belongs to a clade with six members. All have similar genitalia The clade members are:

- Graphium angolanus (Goeze, 1779)
- Graphium endochus (Boisduval, 1836)
- Graphium morania (Angas, 1849)
- Graphium taboranus (Oberthür, 1886)
- Graphium schaffgotschi (Niepelt, 1927)
- Graphium ridleyanus (White, 1843)
