= Abantis contigua =

Scientific classification
- Domain: Eukaryota
- Kingdom: Animalia
- Phylum: Arthropoda
- Class: Insecta
- Order: Lepidoptera
- Family: Hesperiidae
- Genus: Abantis
- Species: A. contigua

Binomial name
- Abantis contigua Evans, 1937

Synonyms
- Abantis venosa contigua Evans, 1937

Species of butterfly

Abantis contigua, the contiguous paradise skipper, is a butterfly in the family Hesperiidae. It is found in Cameroon, the Republic of the Congo, Angola, the Democratic Republic of the Congo, Uganda, western Kenya and Zambia (from the north-west to the Copperbelt). The habitat consists of deciduous woodland.
