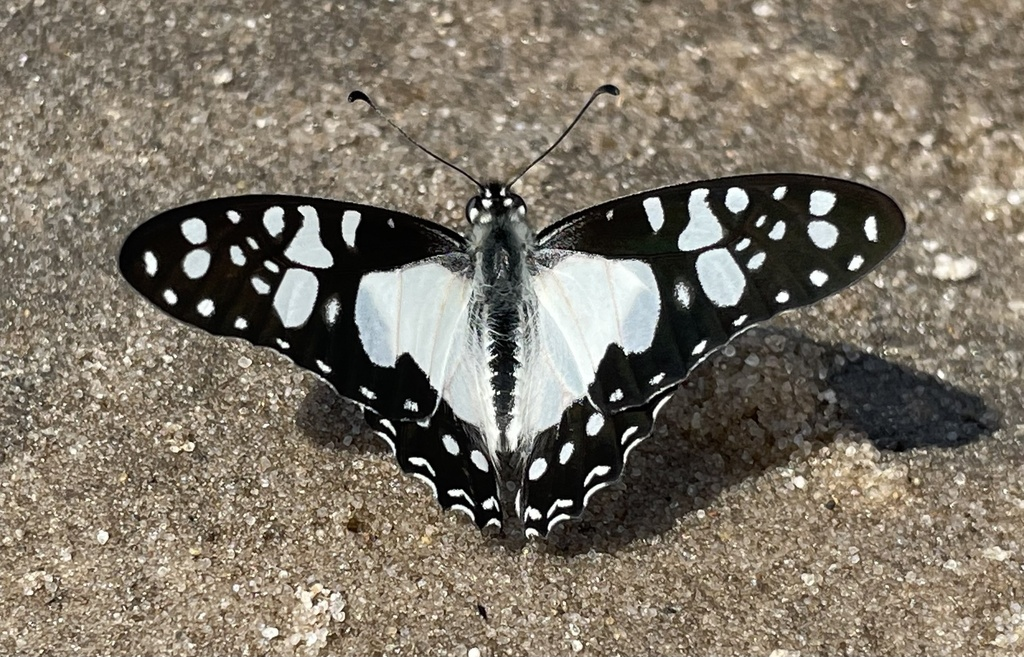

Scientific classification
- Kingdom: Animalia
- Phylum: Arthropoda
- Clade: Pancrustacea
- Class: Insecta
- Order: Lepidoptera
- Family: Papilionidae
- Genus: Graphium
- Species: G. schaffgotschi

Binomial name
- Graphium schaffgotschi (Niepelt, 1927)

Synonyms
- Papilio schaffgotschi Niepelt, 1927; Graphium (Arisbe) schaffgotschi

= Graphium schaffgotschi =

Schaffgotsch's swordtail

Species of butterfly

Graphium schaffgotschi, the Schaffgotsch's swordtail, is a butterfly in the family Papilionidae (swallowtails). It is found in Namibia, Angola, the southern part of the Democratic Republic of the Congo and north-western Zambia. Its habitat consists of savanna.

Adults are on wing year round.

== Images ==
External images from Royal Museum of Central Africa.

== Taxonomy ==
Graphium schaffgotschi belongs to a clade with six members. All have similar genitalia The clade members are:

- Graphium angolanus (Goeze, 1779)
- Graphium endochus (Boisduval, 1836)
- Graphium morania (Angas, 1849)
- Graphium taboranus (Oberthür, 1886)
- Graphium schaffgotschi (Niepelt, 1927)
- Graphium ridleyanus (White, 1843)

It was regarded as conspecific with Graphium taboranus by some earlier authorities.
