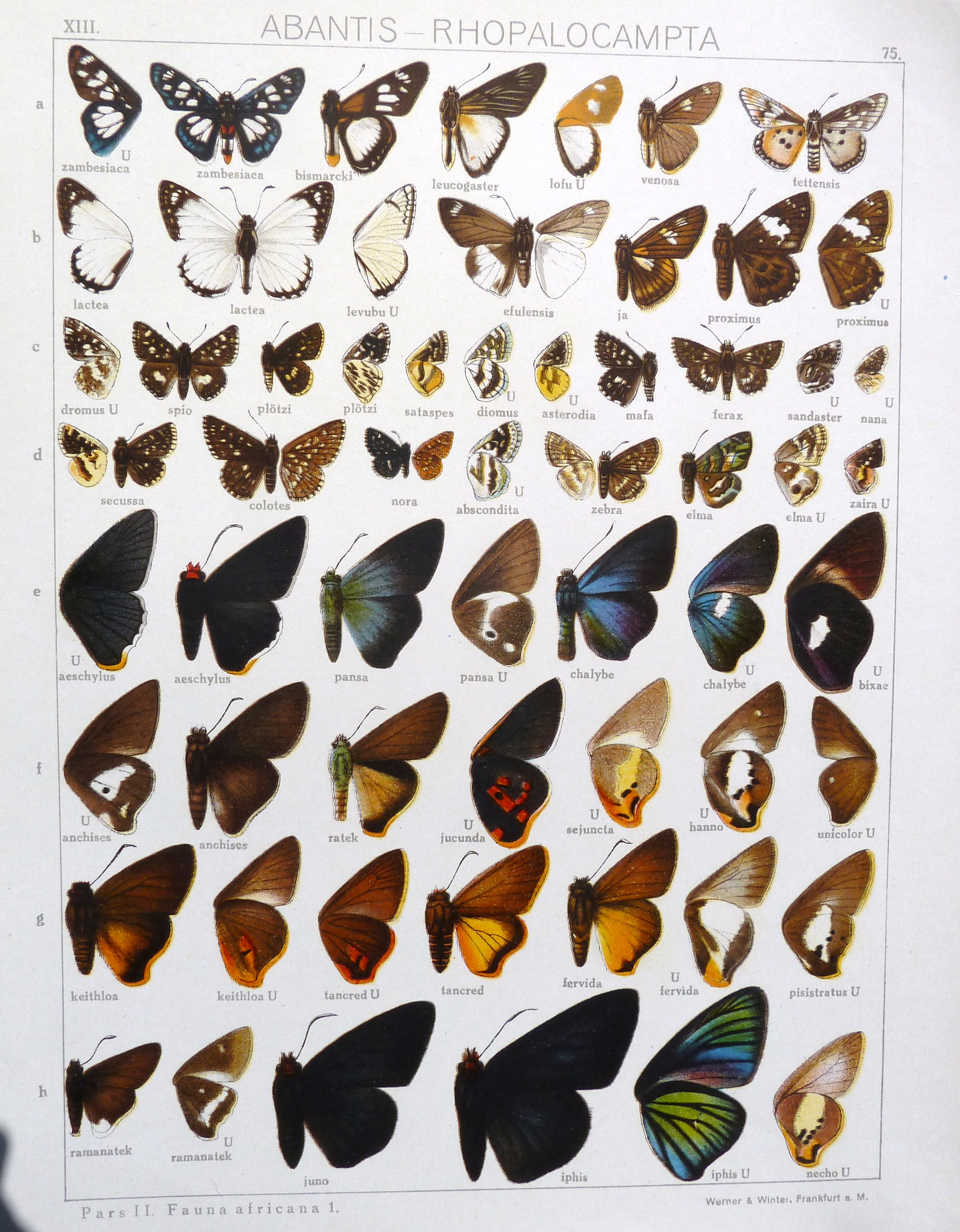
- in Seitz a

Scientific classification
- Kingdom: Animalia
- Phylum: Arthropoda
- Clade: Pancrustacea
- Class: Insecta
- Order: Lepidoptera
- Family: Hesperiidae
- Genus: Abantis
- Species: A. tettensis

Binomial name
- Abantis tettensis Hopffer, 1855

= Abantis tettensis =

Species of butterfly

Abantis tettensis, the spotted velvet skipper, is a butterfly of the family Hesperiidae. It is found in South-West Africa, Botswana, Transvaal, northern Cape, from Zimbabwe to Zaire and in Kenya.

The wingspan is 35–40 mm for males and 35–45 mm for females. Adults are on wing from September to April (with a peak from October to November). There is one extended generation per year.

The larvae feed on Grewia species including Grewia flava and Grewia monticola.
