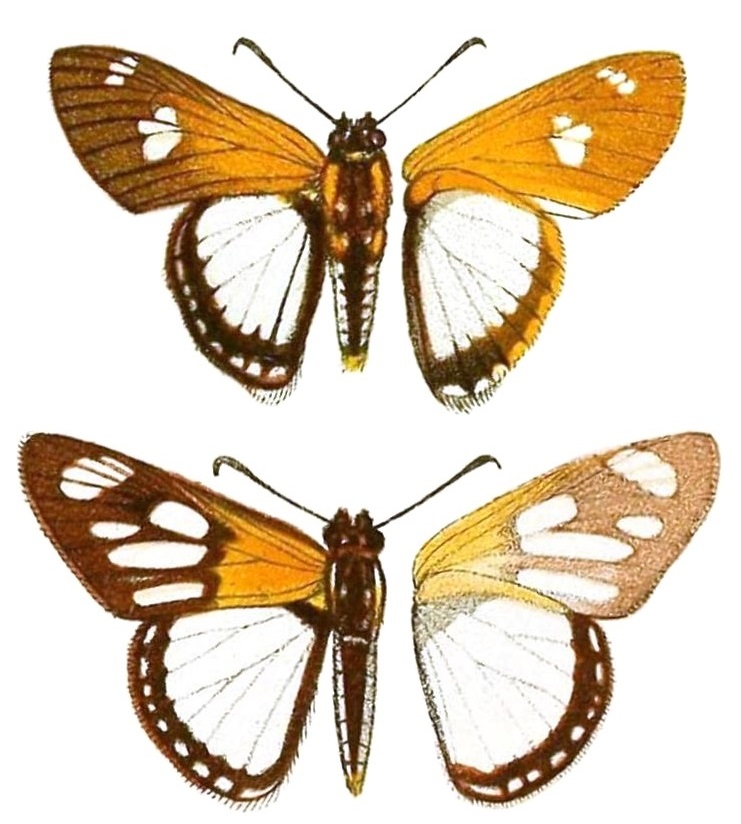
- male and female, upper and underside

Scientific classification
- Domain: Eukaryota
- Kingdom: Animalia
- Phylum: Arthropoda
- Class: Insecta
- Order: Lepidoptera
- Family: Hesperiidae
- Genus: Abantis
- Species: A. lucretia

Binomial name
- Abantis lucretia H. H. Druce, 1909

Synonyms
- Abantis lofu Neave, 1910

= Abantis lucretia =

Lucretia's paradise skipper

Species of butterfly

Abantis lucretia, or Lucretia's paradise skipper, is a butterfly in the family Hesperiidae. The species was first described by Hamilton Herbert Druce in 1909. It is found in Guinea, Sierra Leone, Ghana, Nigeria, Cameroon, the Republic of the Congo, the Democratic Republic of the Congo, Zambia and Uganda. The habitat consists of forests.

Adult males mud-puddle.

== Subspecies ==
- Abantis lucretia lucretia (Guinea, Sierra Leone, Ghana, Nigeria: Cross River loop, Cameroon)
- Abantis lucretia etoumbiensis Miller, 1971 (Congo, south-western Uganda)
- Abantis lucretia lofu Neave, 1910 (Democratic Republic of the Congo: Shaba, northern Zambia)
