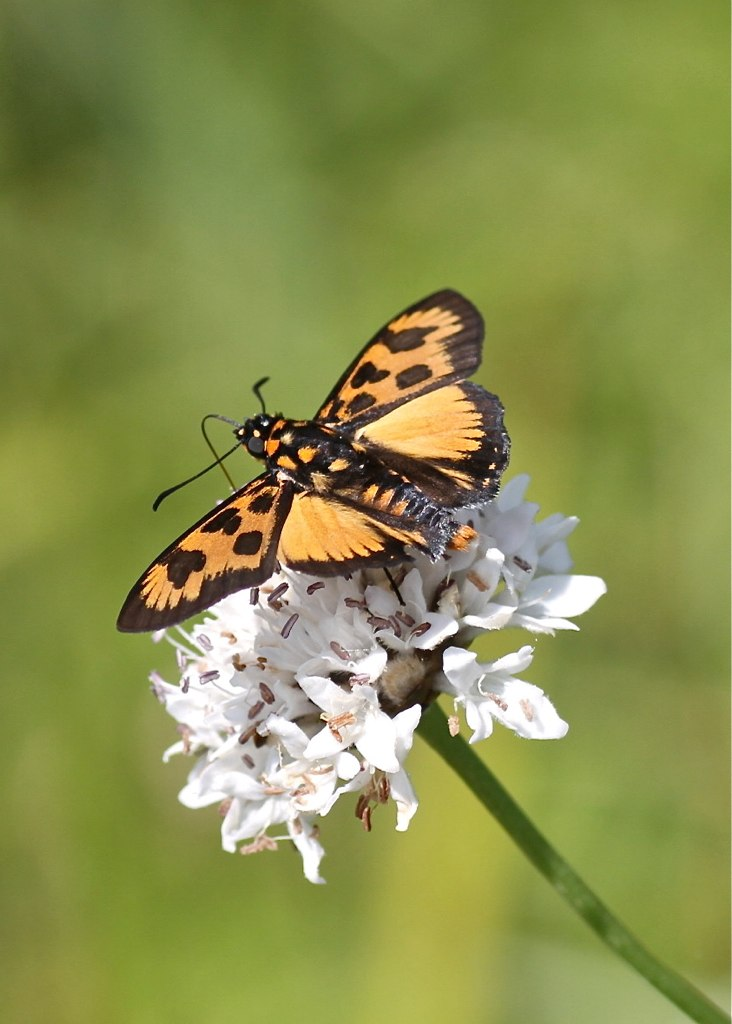
- Abantis bicolor in South Africa

Scientific classification
- Kingdom: Animalia
- Phylum: Arthropoda
- Clade: Pancrustacea
- Class: Insecta
- Order: Lepidoptera
- Family: Hesperiidae
- Tribe: Tagiadini
- Genus: Abantis; Hopffer, 1855

Synonyms
- Sapaea Plötz, 1879; Abantiades Fairmaire, 1894 (not Herrich-Schäffer, 1855); Leucochitonea Wallengren, 1857; Caprona Wallengren, 1857

= Abantis =

Paradise skippers

Genus of skipper butterflies in tribe Tagiadini

Abantis is an Afrotropical genus of skipper butterflies. They are also known as the paradise skippers. Their imagos are generally attractive with bold or colourful wing and/or body markings. They occur in either forest or savanna, and several species are very localized or thinly distributed. The territorial males are encountered more often than the females. Males engage territorial intruders, and are prone to very rapid and high flight, while females display more relaxed flight habits, closer to the ground. Plants of several families serve as food plants, and only one egg is oviposited per plant. The larva is pale and spotted to varying degrees, and pupates inside a leaf shelter drawn together by silk threads.

== Species ==
- Abantis adelica (Karsch, 1892)
- Abantis amneris (Rebel & Rogenhofer, 1894)
- Abantis arctomarginata Lathy, 1901
- Abantis bamptoni Collins & Larsen, 1994
- Abantis bicolor (Trimen, 1864)
- Abantis bismarcki Karsch, 1892
- Abantis canopus (Trimen, 1864)
- Abantis cassualalla (Bethune-Baker, 1911)
- Abantis contigua Evans, 1937
- Abantis efulensis Holland, 1896
- Abantis elegantula (Mabille, 1890)
- Abantis eltringhami Jordan, 1932
- Abantis hindei (Druce, 1903)
- Abantis ja Druce, 1909
- Abantis leucogaster (Mabille, 1890)
- Abantis levubu (Wallengren, 1857)
- Abantis lucretia Druce, 1909
- Abantis meneliki Berger, 1979
- Abantis meru Evans, 1947
- Abantis nigeriana Butler, 1901
- Abantis paradisea (Butler, 1870)
- Abantis pillaana (Wallengren, 1857)
- Abantis pseudonigeriana Usher, 1984
- Abantis rubra Holland, 1920
- Abantis tanobia Collins & Larsen, 2005
- Abantis tettensis Hopffer, 1855
- Abantis venosa Trimen, 1889
- Abantis vidua Weymer, 1901
- Abantis zambesiaca (Westwood, 1874)
