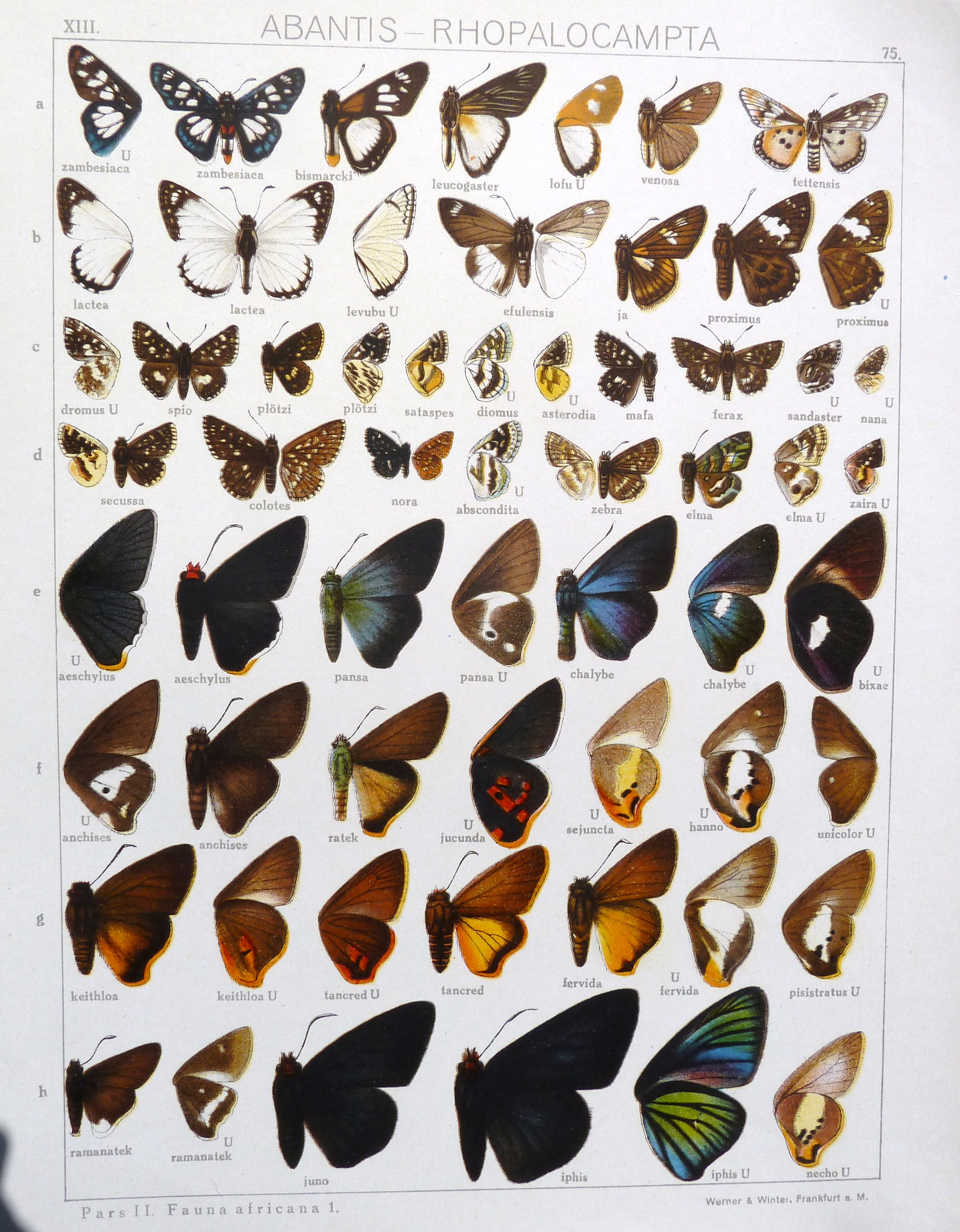

Scientific classification
- Domain: Eukaryota
- Kingdom: Animalia
- Phylum: Arthropoda
- Class: Insecta
- Order: Lepidoptera
- Family: Hesperiidae
- Genus: Abantis
- Species: A. bismarcki

Binomial name
- Abantis bismarcki Karsch, 1892

= Abantis bismarcki =

Species of butterfly

Abantis bismarcki, Bismarck's paradise skipper, is a butterfly in the family Hesperiidae. It is found in Guinea, Ivory Coast, Ghana, Togo, northern Nigeria, Cameroon, the Democratic Republic of the Congo, southern Sudan, Uganda and western Kenya. The habitat consists of the transition zone between dry forests and Guinea savanna.
