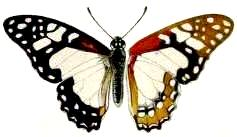

Scientific classification
- Kingdom: Animalia
- Phylum: Arthropoda
- Clade: Pancrustacea
- Class: Insecta
- Order: Lepidoptera
- Family: Papilionidae
- Genus: Graphium
- Species: G. morania

Binomial name
- Graphium morania (Angas, 1849) .

Synonyms
- Papilio morania Angas, 1849; Graphium morania f. vansoniana Storace, 1953; Graphium morania var. holoplaga Grei, 1986

= Graphium morania =

White lady

Species of butterfly

Graphium morania, the white lady or small white-lady swordtail, is a species of butterfly in the family Papilionidae (swallowtails). It is found in southern Africa (KwaZulu-Natal, Zululand, Eswatini, Transvaal, S.Mozambique, SE.Zimbabwe, E.Botswana).

== Description ==
The wingspan is 50–55 mm in males and 55–60 mm in females. Hindwing beneath without red spots in the marginal band; both wings above with white spots in the marginal band; abdomen without continuous yellow lateral stripe, at most with three yellow lateral spots on segments 2—4, on the other hand with triangular black lateral spots. Apex of the cell of the forewing either filled by a single white spot or with two spots, which however are only narrowly or incompletely separated.The discal spot in cellule 2 of the forewing is large and completely fills up the base of the cellule; the white subdiscal spots of cellules 2—5 of the hindwing above are placed nearer to the inner margin than to the outer margin of the black marginal band; the markings yellowish or greenish white. Ovambo Land to Delagoa Bay.

== Biology ==
Its fight period is year-round, peaking in November and February.

The larvae feed on Uvaria caffra, Artabotrys species, Hexalobus monopetalus, Artabotrys brachypetalus, Artabotrys monteiroae, and Annona senegalensis.

== Taxonomy ==
Graphium morania belongs to a clade with six members. All have similar genitalia The clade members are:

- Graphium angolanus (Goeze, 1779)
- Graphium endochus (Boisduval, 1836)
- Graphium morania (Angas, 1849)
- Graphium taboranus (Oberthür, 1886)
- Graphium schaffgotschi (Niepelt, 1927)
- Graphium ridleyanus (White, 1843)
