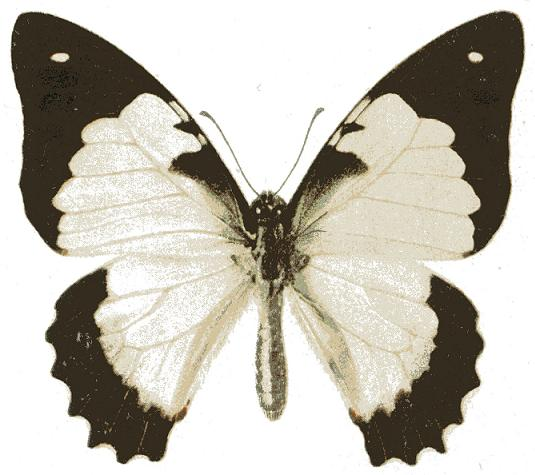

Scientific classification
- Kingdom: Animalia
- Phylum: Arthropoda
- Clade: Pancrustacea
- Class: Insecta
- Order: Lepidoptera
- Family: Papilionidae
- Genus: Graphium
- Species: G. endochus

Binomial name
- Graphium endochus (Boisduval, 1836)

Synonyms
- Papilio endochus Boisduval, 1836; Graphium (Arisbe) endochus

= Graphium endochus =

Species of butterfly

Graphium endochus is a butterfly in the family Papilionidae. It is found in northern and eastern Madagascar and Mozambique. The habitat consists of forests.

== Description ==
Diagnostic- Hindwing beneath with 4—5 free red subdiscal spots in 1 c—5. The white basal part of the upper surface of the wings is very large, almost reaches the apex of the cell on the forewing and extends beyond the cell on the hindwing; the black parts of the upperside are almost without spots with the exception of a small spot in cellule 7 of the hindwing. Madagascar.

== Taxonomy ==
Graphium endochus belongs to a clade with six members. All have similar genitalia The clade members are:

- Graphium angolanus (Goeze, 1779)
- Graphium endochus (Boisduval, 1836)
- Graphium morania (Angas, 1849)
- Graphium taboranus (Oberthür, 1886)
- Graphium schaffgotschi (Niepelt, 1927)
- Graphium ridleyanus (White, 1843)
