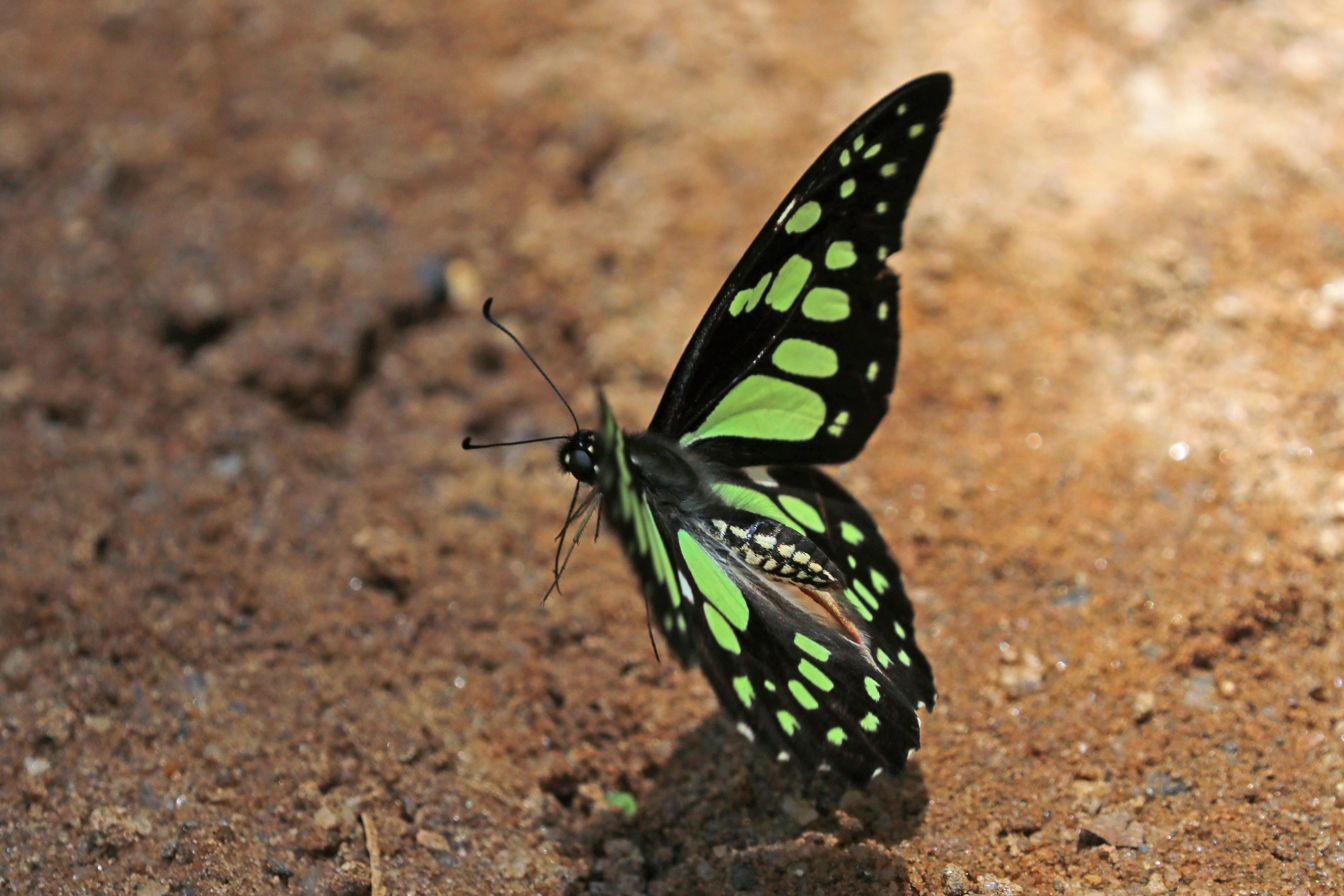
- Dorsal view
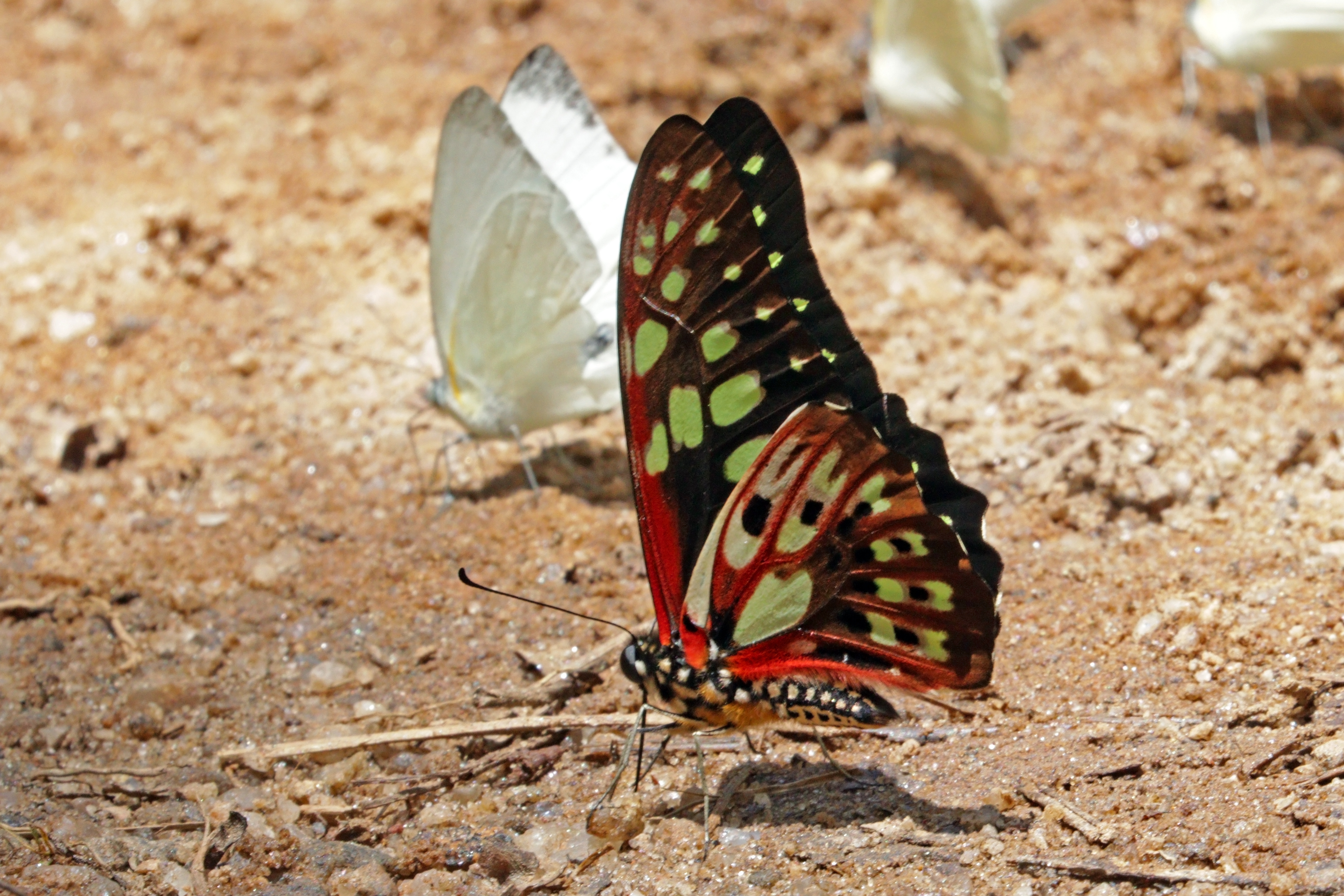
- Ventral view

Scientific classification
- Kingdom: Animalia
- Phylum: Arthropoda
- Clade: Pancrustacea
- Class: Insecta
- Order: Lepidoptera
- Family: Papilionidae
- Genus: Graphium
- Species: G. cyrnus

Binomial name
- Graphium cyrnus (Boisduval, 1836)

Synonyms
- Papilio cyrnus Boisduval, 1836; Graphium (Arisbe) cyrnus; Papilio cyrnus nuscyrus Suffert, 1904; Graphium cyrnus f. similis Storace, 1953; Graphium cyrnus f. adiecta Storace, 1953

= Graphium cyrnus =

Species of butterfly

Graphium cyrnus is a butterfly in the family Papilionidae.

The top of the wings consist of black with many greenish-yellow dots, with the underside being roughly the same but instead of black, it is a reddish-brown.

It is found on Madagascar. The habitat consists of subhumid forests.

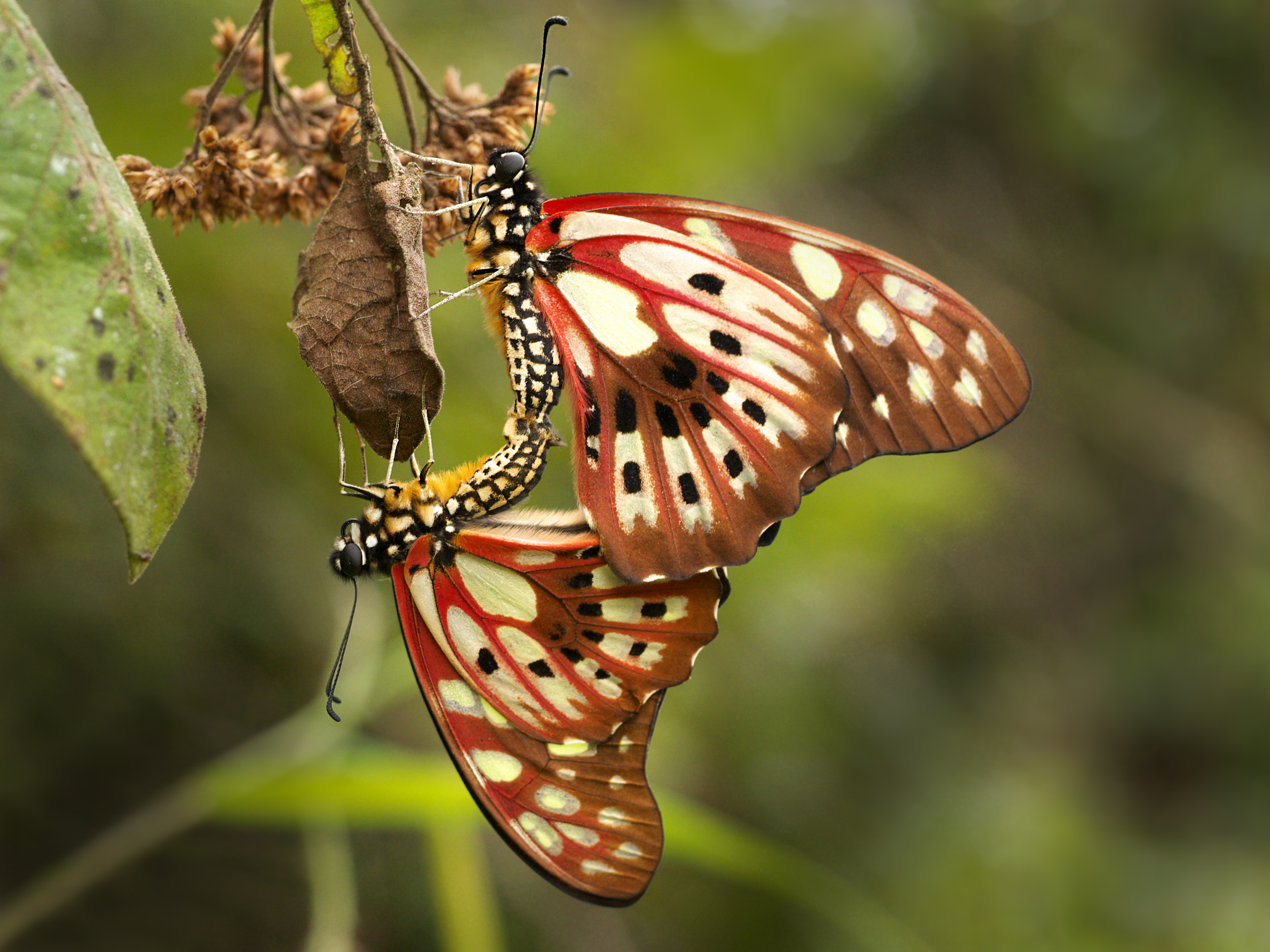
Mating pair

== Taxonomy ==
It is a member of the leonidas-group of closely species (Graphium leonidas, Graphium levassori, Graphium cyrnus).
