= Abantis vidua =

Scientific classification
- Domain: Eukaryota
- Kingdom: Animalia
- Phylum: Arthropoda
- Class: Insecta
- Order: Lepidoptera
- Family: Hesperiidae
- Genus: Abantis
- Species: A. vidua

Binomial name
- Abantis vidua Weymer, 1901

Synonyms
- Abantis venosa var. vidua Weymer, 1901

Species of butterfly

Abantis vidua is a butterfly in the family Hesperiidae. It is found in Angola, the Democratic Republic of the Congo (Shaba) and north-western Zambia. The habitat consists of deciduous woodland.
