= Leucochitonea amneris =

Scientific classification
- Kingdom: Animalia
- Phylum: Arthropoda
- Class: Insecta
- Order: Lepidoptera
- Family: Hesperiidae
- Genus: Abantis
- Species: A. amneris

Binomial name
- Abantis amneris (Rebel & Rogenhofer, 1894)

Synonyms
- Abantis amneris Rebel & Rogenhofer, 1894

Species of butterfly

Leucochitonea amneris is a butterfly in the family Hesperiidae. It is found in Tanzania, from Mount Kilimanjaro to Njombe and Tabora.
