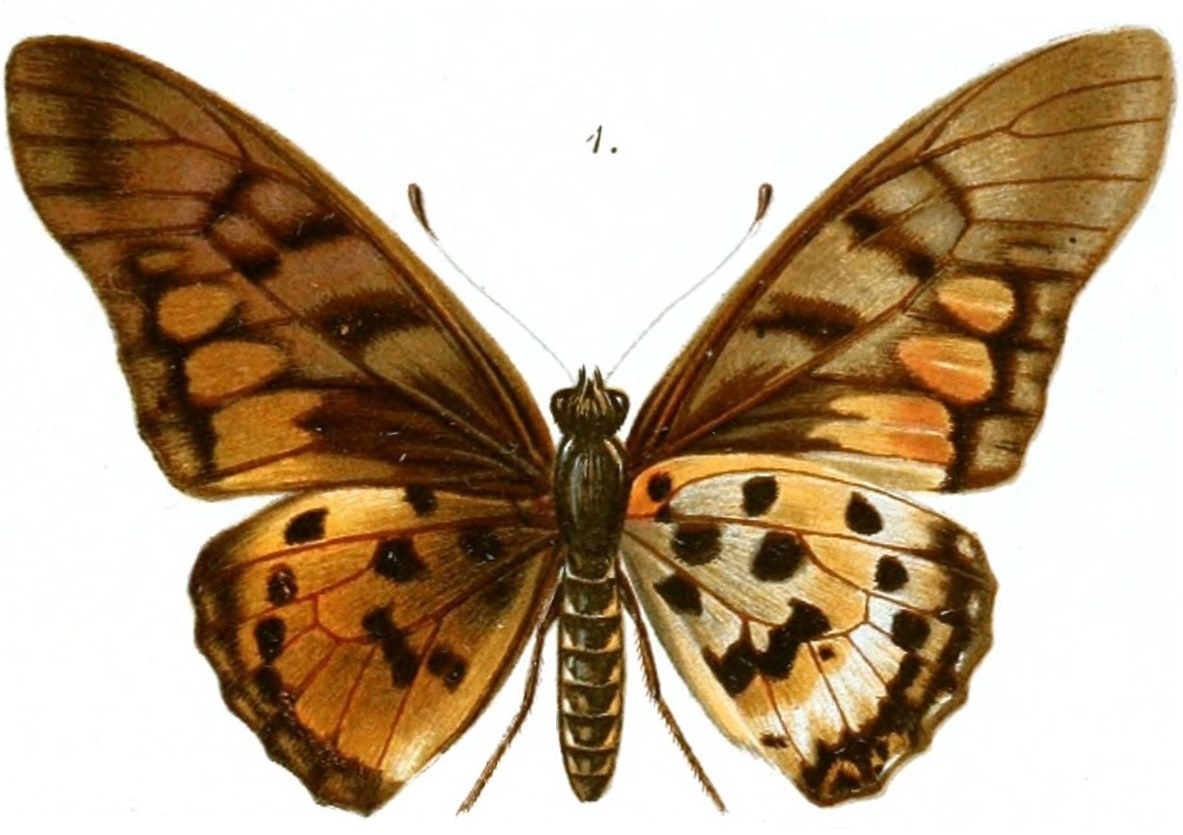
- Female, upper and underwing

Scientific classification
- Kingdom: Animalia
- Phylum: Arthropoda
- Clade: Pancrustacea
- Class: Insecta
- Order: Lepidoptera
- Family: Papilionidae
- Genus: Graphium
- Species: G. ridleyanus

Binomial name
- Graphium ridleyanus (White, 1843)

Synonyms
- Papilio ridleyanus White, 1843; Graphium (Arisbe) ridleyanus; Papilio ridleyanus ab. infuscatus Schultze, 1913; Papilio ridleyanus var. fumatus Niepelt, 1915; Papilio ridleyanus var. fumosus Holland, 1920; Papilio ridleyanus f. rosa Le Cerf, 1924; Papilio ridleyanus njami Röber, 1928; Papilio ridleyanus ab. semivitreus Schultze, 1930; Papilio (Cosmodesmus) ridleyanus ab. hecqueti Dufrane, 1946

= Graphium ridleyanus =

Acraea swordtail

Species of butterfly

Graphium ridleyanus, the acraea swordtail, is a butterfly in the family Papilionidae (swallowtails). It is found in eastern Nigeria, Cameroon, Equatorial Guinea, Sao Tome and Principe, Gabon, the Republic of the Congo, Angola, the Central African Republic, the DRC, Chad, southern Sudan, Uganda, Rwanda, Burundi, western Tanzania and Zambia. Its habitat consists of the forest/savanna transition zone.

== Description ==
Hindwing rounded, without tail. Frons broadly yellow at each side, only narrowly black in the middle. Palpi unicolorous yellow. Wings above black and red, marked similarly to the species of the nymphalid genus Acraea. Forewing black, semitransparent in places, with a half-band of 5 red spotsin cellules 1 a—4 and two deep black transverse spots, margined with yellow at each side, in the cell; hindwing above red with black marginal band and base and a few black spots. From Lokoja on the Niger to Angola, Equatoria and Bukoba on the Victoria Nyanza. External images from Royal Museum of Central Africa.

== Biology ==
Adults mimic large brush-footed butterflies of the genus Acraea, such as Acraea egina and Acraea perenna. Males are known to mud-puddle.

The larvae feed on Popowia congoensis.

== Taxonomy ==
Graphium eridleyanus belongs to a clade with six members. All have similar genitalia The clade members are:

- Graphium angolanus (Goeze, 1779)
- Graphium endochus (Boisduval, 1836)
- Graphium morania (Angas, 1849)
- Graphium taboranus (Oberthür, 1886)
- Graphium schaffgotschi (Niepelt, 1927)
- Graphium ridleyanus (White, 1843)

== Realm ==
Afrotropical realm

== Etymology ==
The name honours "Mr. Ridley, a gentleman in the W African Coast Service whose love for our favourite science was displayed by a collection he made near the fort of Accra and sent to this country. He gave great promise of excelling in entomology, and fell a victim to the climate of W. Africa" according to Adam White, member of the entomological societies of London and Paris, assistant in the Zoology Department, British Museum, from: "Description of some apparently new Insects from the Congo, sent to England by Mr. Curror, Surgeon R. N., and the late Mr. John Cranch" (1843) Annals and Magazine of Natural History 12:262-268.

== See also ==
- Guinean Forests of West Africa
- Congolian forests
