= Abantis meru =

Conservation status
- Endangered (IUCN 3.1)

Scientific classification
- Kingdom: Animalia
- Phylum: Arthropoda
- Class: Insecta
- Order: Lepidoptera
- Family: Hesperiidae
- Genus: Abantis
- Species: A. meru

Binomial name
- Abantis meru Evans, 1947

Synonyms
- Abantis paradisea meru Evans, 1947

Species of butterfly

Abantis meru is a butterfly in the family Hesperiidae. It is found in Kenya, where it is only known from the highlands east of the Rift Valley.

The larvae feed on Vernonia jugalis.
