= Abantis pseudonigeriana =

Scientific classification
- Kingdom: Animalia
- Phylum: Arthropoda
- Clade: Pancrustacea
- Class: Insecta
- Order: Lepidoptera
- Family: Hesperiidae
- Genus: Abantis
- Species: A. pseudonigeriana

Binomial name
- Abantis pseudonigeriana Usher, 1984

Species of butterfly

Abantis pseudonigeriana, the beige paradise skipper, is a butterfly in the family Hesperiidae. It is found in eastern Senegal, Guinea, northern Sierra Leone, northern Ghana and Nigeria. The habitat consists of dry savanna.

Adult males have been found feeding on dead turtles and dead fish but are also attracted to flowers. There is a dry-season and a wet-season form.

Torben Larsen developed a species numbering system for his 2005 publication Butterflies of West Africa. This species is #1259. The 'Larsen' numbers have since been used with permission in A Sharp Eye on Butterflies of Ghana.
