= Abantis tanobia =

Scientific classification
- Kingdom: Animalia
- Phylum: Arthropoda
- Clade: Pancrustacea
- Class: Insecta
- Order: Lepidoptera
- Family: Hesperiidae
- Genus: Abantis
- Species: A. tanobia

Binomial name
- Abantis tanobia Collins & Larsen, 2005

Species of butterfly

Abantis tanobia, the Ghana paradise skipper, is a butterfly in the family Hesperiidae. It is found in western Ghana. The habitat consists of forests.

Adults are on wing in December, January and February.
