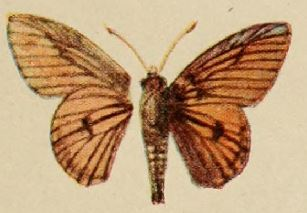

Scientific classification
- Kingdom: Animalia
- Phylum: Arthropoda
- Clade: Pancrustacea
- Class: Insecta
- Order: Lepidoptera
- Family: Hesperiidae
- Genus: Abantis
- Species: A. rubra

Binomial name
- Abantis rubra Holland, 1920

= Abantis rubra =

Species of butterfly

Abantis rubra, the russet paradise skipper, is a butterfly in the family Hesperiidae. It is found in Nigeria (the Cross River loop), Cameroon, the Republic of the Congo, the Central African Republic and the Democratic Republic of the Congo. The habitat consists of forests.
