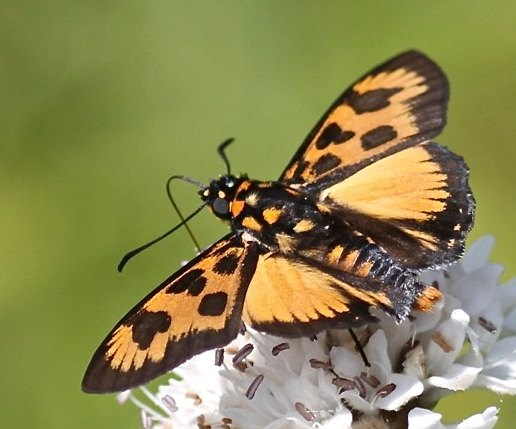
- Imago at Vernon Crookes Nature Reserve in KwaZulu-Natal

Conservation status
- Near Threatened (IUCN 3.1)

Scientific classification
- Kingdom: Animalia
- Phylum: Arthropoda
- Class: Insecta
- Order: Lepidoptera
- Family: Hesperiidae
- Genus: Abantis
- Species: A. bicolor

Binomial name
- Abantis bicolor (Trimen, 1864)
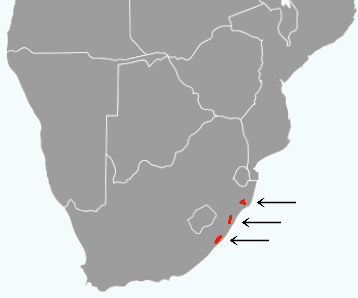
- range

Synonyms
- Leucochitonea bicolor Trimen, 1864

= Abantis bicolor =

Bicoloured skipper

Species of butterfly

Abantis bicolor, the bicoloured skipper, is a butterfly of the family Hesperiidae and the subfamily Pyrginae. Described in 1864 and endemic to South Africa, the bicoloured skipper is restricted to lowland forests from the Eastern Cape to the southern and northern coasts of KwaZulu-Natal.

The wingspan is 36–41 mm for males and 35–45 mm for females. There are two generations per year, with a peak in spring from October to November and a stronger peak in autumn from March to June.
