= Abantis cassualalla =

Scientific classification
- Domain: Eukaryota
- Kingdom: Animalia
- Phylum: Arthropoda
- Class: Insecta
- Order: Lepidoptera
- Family: Hesperiidae
- Genus: Abantis
- Species: A. cassualalla

Binomial name
- Abantis cassualalla (Bethune-Baker, 1911)

Synonyms
- Caprona cassualalla Bethune-Baker, 1911

Species of butterfly

Abantis cassualalla, the Kavango skipper, is a species of butterfly in the family Hesperiidae. It is found in Angola and northern Namibia. The habitat consists of very dry savanna.

Adults feed from the flowers of trees in spring. They are on wing from September to June. There are seasonal forms.

The larvae feed on Grewia species
