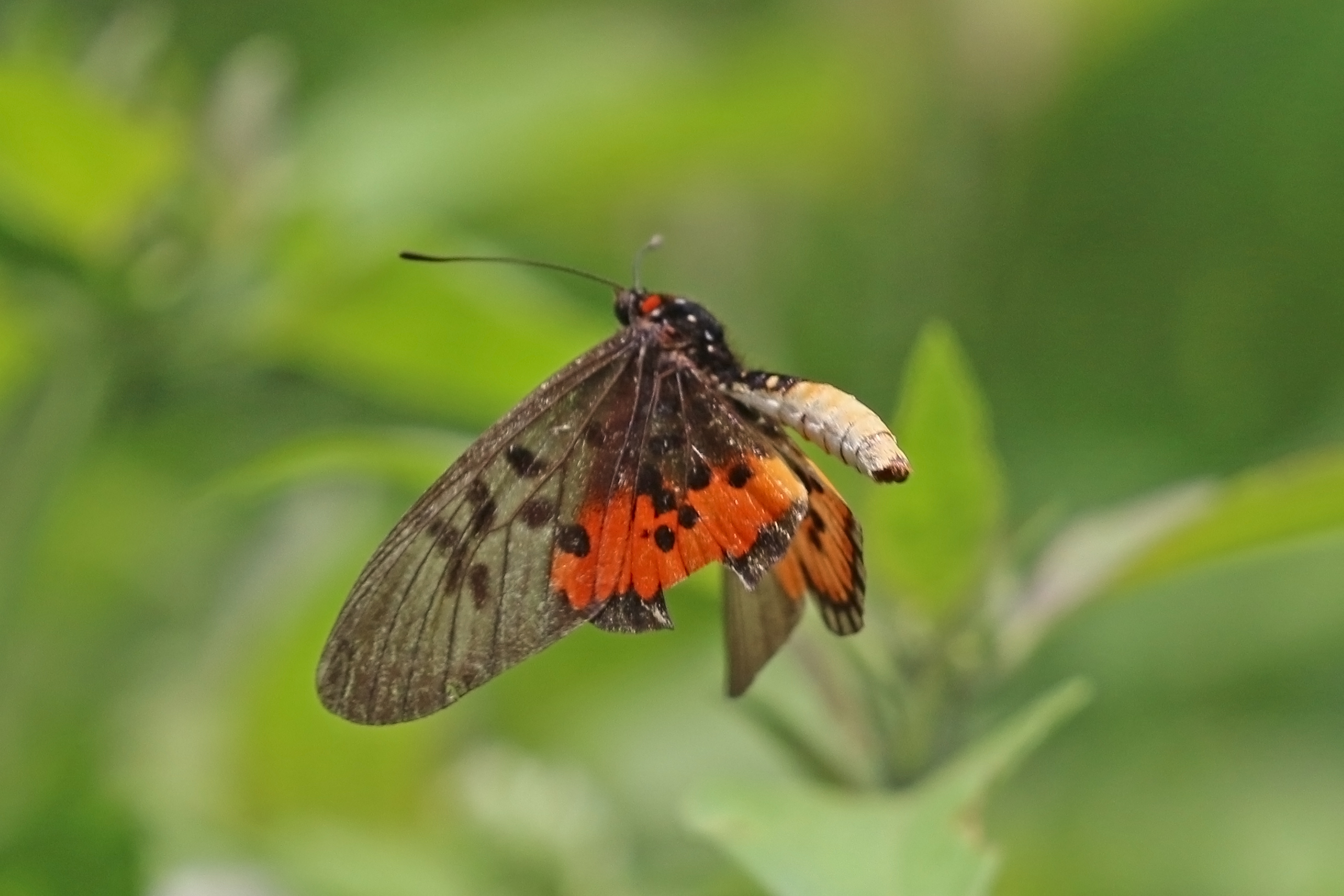

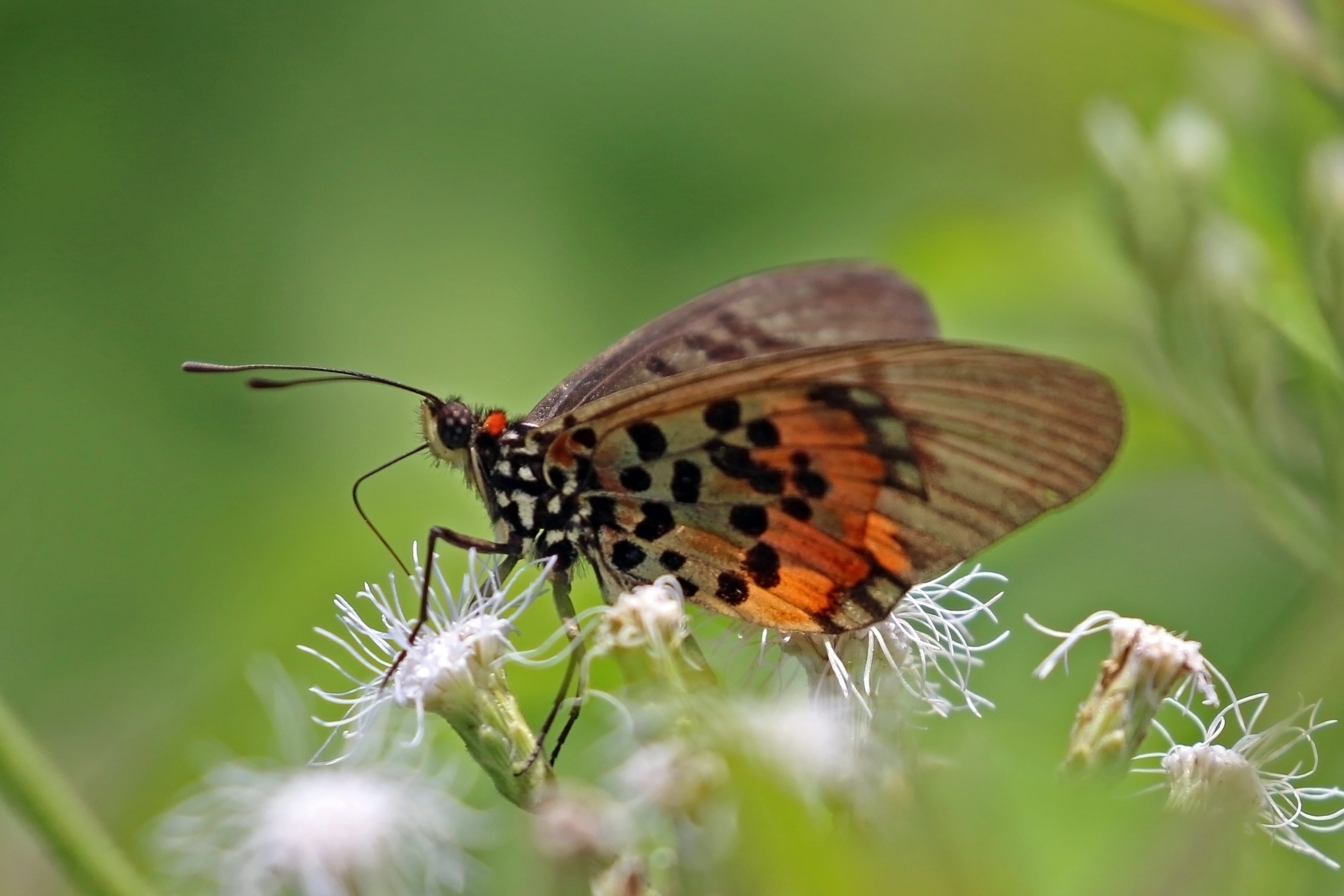
- A. e. egina in flight and feeding at a flower, Ghana

Scientific classification
- Kingdom: Animalia
- Phylum: Arthropoda
- Clade: Pancrustacea
- Class: Insecta
- Order: Lepidoptera
- Family: Nymphalidae
- Genus: Acraea
- Species: A. egina

Binomial name
- Acraea egina (Cramer, 1775)

Synonyms
- Papilio egina Cramer, 1775; Acraea (Acraea) egina; Papilio rudolphina Herbst, 1792; Papilio persephone Fabricius, 1793; Acraea zidora Godart, 1819; Acraea khara Grose-Smith, 1889; Acraea egina f. contraria Grünberg, 1910; Acraea egina f. alba Eltringham, 1913; Acraea egina intensa Stoneham, 1937; Acraea egina f. tenuimarginatus Stoneham, 1937; Acraea egina f. rubristriatus Stoneham, 1937; Acraea egina bellehui Carcasson, 1961; Acraea areca Mabille, 1889; Acraea harrisoni Sharpe, 1904

= Acraea egina =

Elegant acraea

Species of butterfly

Acraea egina, the elegant acraea, is a species of butterfly in the family Nymphalidae with an extensive range in sub-Saharan Africa.

== Distribution ==
This species can be found in Senegal, Gambia, Guinea-Bissau, Guinea, Bénin, Burkina Faso, Sierra Leone, Liberia, Ivory Coast, Ghana, Togo, Nigeria, Cameroon, Equatorial Guinea, Gabon, the Republic of the Congo, the Central African Republic, Angola, the Democratic Republic of the Congo, Sudan, Uganda, Ethiopia, Kenya, Tanzania, Malawi, Zambia, Mozambique, Zimbabwe, and South Africa.

== Habitat ==
The habitats of this species mainly consists of dry forests and savannah, but it also prefers clearings and open areas in the rainforest.

== Description ==
The wingspan of Acraea egina can reach 60–65 millimetres (2.4–2.6 in). Wings are basically brick red, with black spots on both forewings and hindwings and a quite large black margin on the hindwing upperside. These butterflies are closely mimicked by Pseudacraea boisduvali and by Graphium ridleyanus in the shade of color, in the cut of the wings and in the pattern of markings.

The larvae of Acraea egina are whitish with black rings and black tubercules, while the pupae are pinkish brown. They feed on Adenia lobata and Rawsonia species.

== Description in Seitz ==
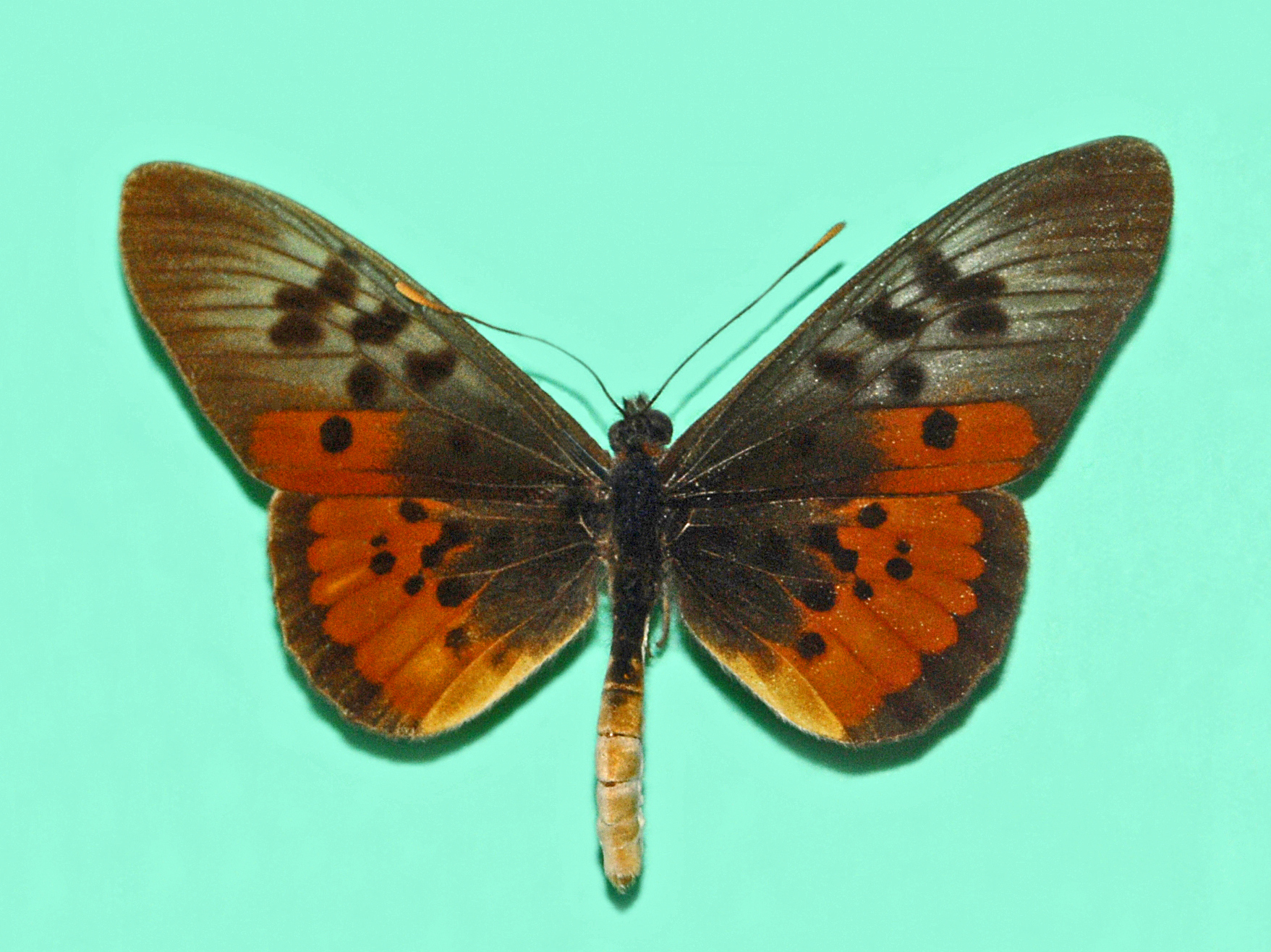
Imago – mounted specimen

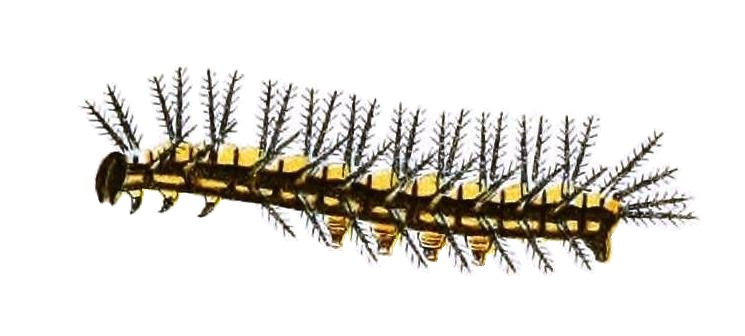
Larva in Eltringham (1912)

A. egina Cr. (54 d) is much larger than perenna and has the wings quite differently shaped but is very similarly coloured in the male. In this sex the forewing is blackish, in the middle somewhat transparent, and has at the hinder angle in 1 a and 1 b a large yellow-red spot, which, however, does not extend beyond vein 2; hindwing above black at least as far as vein 2, then with broad yellow-red transverse band and broad, unspotted black marginal band, somewhat dentate at the veins, the discal dot in 4 placed nearer to the distal margin than the rest. Fore wing beneath almost as above, but lighter and more thinly scaled; hind wing beneath light reddish with red spots at the base and at the marginal band and between the large, free black dots more or less greenish yellow; marginal spots large, quadrate, greenish yellow; collar red; last half of the abdomen light yellow. In the female the ground-colour of both wings is black grey without red-yellow spots, but with an indefinite whitish subapical band on the forewing.

- Larva whitish yellow with two black longitudinal lines on each side; head and spines black. Pupa whitish with very fine black markings. Senegal to Angola, Nyassaland and Uganda.
- harrisoni E. Sharpe. In the borderlands between the West and East African subregions there usually occur also in this species transitions to the East African race. These are distinguished by having the red-yellow colour of the forewing present not only in 1 a and 1 b, but also as fine longitudinal streaks first in 2 and then also in the other cellules; the under surface of the hindwing is for the most part suffused with orange-yellow; the discal dots are sometimes as large as in egina, sometimes much smaller, particularly on the hindwing, ab. contraria Grunb. (= kiwuensis Grunb.). Rhodesia; Nyassaland and on the shores of the Victoria Nyanza.
- areca Mab. (54 e) is the East African race and following the rule which obtains in almost all African Acraeids is characterized by having the red-yellow colour of the forewing more extended, more or less completely covering the cell and the base of cellules 2 to 6; the under surface of the hindwing is for the most part orange-yellow. In the female the ground-colour is more yellowish than in the type-form. South-East Rhodesia, Nyassaland, German and British East Africa.

== Subspecies ==
- Acraea egina egina — Senegal, Gambia, Guinea-Bissau, Guinea, Burkina Faso, Sierra Leone, Liberia, Ivory Coast, Ghana, Togo, Nigeria, Cameroon, Equatorial Guinea, Gabon, Congo, Central African Republic, Angola, Democratic Republic of the Congo, southern Sudan, Uganda, Ethiopia, western Kenya, northern Zambia
- Acraea egina areca Mabille, 1889 — Kenya, Tanzania, Malawi, Mozambique, eastern Zimbabwe, South Africa: Limpopo Province
- Acraea egina harrisoni Sharpe, 1904 — coast of Kenya
- Acraea egina pembanus Kielland, 1990 — Pemba

Torben Larsen developed a species numbering system for his 2005 publication Butterflies of West Africa. The nominate subspecies is #1176. The 'Larsen' numbers have since been used with permission in A Sharp Eye on Butterflies of Ghana.

== Taxonomy ==
It is a member of the Acraea egina species group – but see also Pierre & Bernaud, 2014
