= Abantis bamptoni =

Scientific classification
- Domain: Eukaryota
- Kingdom: Animalia
- Phylum: Arthropoda
- Class: Insecta
- Order: Lepidoptera
- Family: Hesperiidae
- Genus: Abantis
- Species: A. bamptoni

Binomial name
- Abantis bamptoni Collins & Larsen, 1994

Synonyms
- Abantis bismarcki f. neavei Aurivillius, 1925

Species of butterfly

Abantis bamptoni, Bampton's paradise skipper, is a butterfly in the family Hesperiidae. It is found in Zimbabwe, Mozambique, western Tanzania, northern Zambia and the Democratic Republic of the Congo (from Shaba to Mpala). The habitat consists of deciduous woodland, including Brachystegia woodland.

Adults have been recorded feeding from tall purple flowers, as well as from the flowers of Lantana species.

The larvae feed on Uapaca kirkiana, Uapaca nitida and Uapaca sansibarica.
