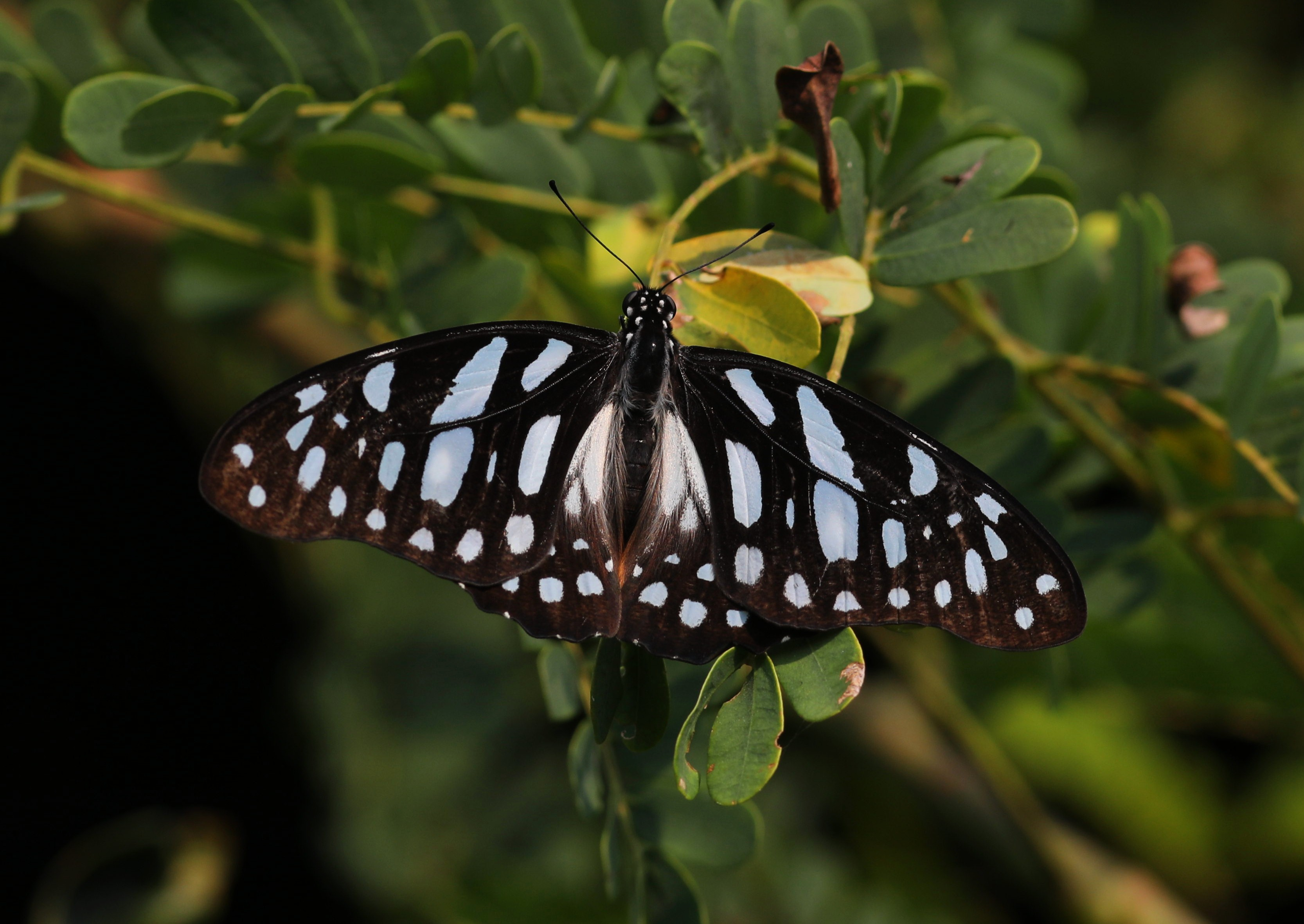

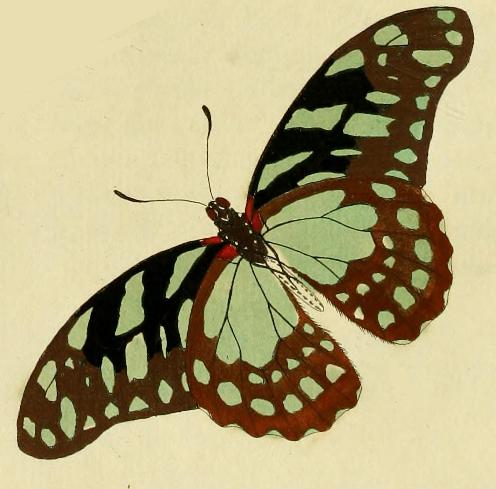

Scientific classification
- Kingdom: Animalia
- Phylum: Arthropoda
- Clade: Pancrustacea
- Class: Insecta
- Order: Lepidoptera
- Family: Papilionidae
- Genus: Graphium
- Species: G. leonidas

Binomial name
- Graphium leonidas (Fabricius, 1793)

Subspecies
- See text

Synonyms
- Papilio leonidas Fabricius, 1793; Papilio similis Cramer, 1775; Papilio brasidas Felder & Felder, 1864; Papilio leonidas ab. interniplaga Aurivillius, 1899; Papilio onidale Suffert, 1904; Papilio similis umanus Rothschild & Jordan, 1905; Papilio leonidas leonidas f. plagifera Le Cerf, 1924; Papilio leonidas brasidas f. melusina Le Cerf, 1924; Papilio leonidas f. petiveranoides Bryk, 1928; Papilio (Cosmodesmus) leonidas leonidas ab. obliterata Dufrane, 1946; Papilio (Cosmodesmus) leonidas leonidas ab. subobliterata Dufrane, 1946; Papilio (Cosmodesmus) leonidas leonidas ab. vreuricki Dufrane, 1946; Papilio (Cosmodesmus) leonidas leonidas ab. mathieui Dufrane, 1946; Graphium leonidas leonidas ab. vrydaghi Berger, 1950; Graphium leonidas leonidas ab. leucosina Berger, 1950; Graphium leonidas leonidas ab. djema Berger, 1950; Graphium leonidas ab. cyrnoides Storace, 1953; Papilio leonidas var. pelopidas Oberthür, 1879; Graphium leonidas zanzibaricus Kielland, 1990; Papilio leonidas santa-marthae Joicey & Talbot, 1927; Papilio leonidas thomasius Le Cerf, 1924

= Graphium leonidas =

Veined swordtail

Species of butterfly

Graphium leonidas, the veined swordtail, veined swallowtail or common graphium, is a species of butterfly in the family Papilionidae, found in Sub-Saharan Africa.

== Description ==
For terms see External morphology of Lepidoptera

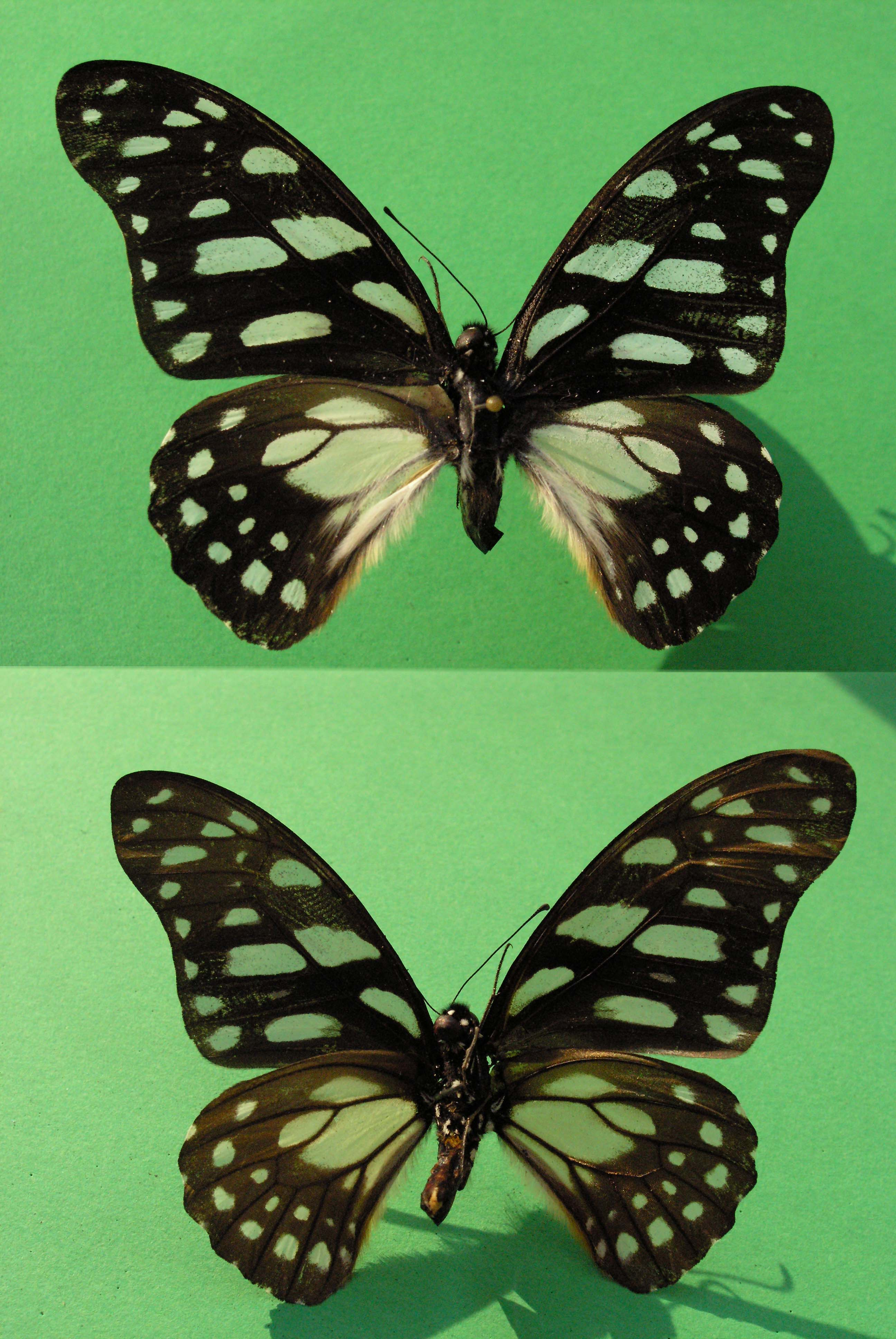
recto (top) and verso of male

The wingspan is 75–80 mm in males and 75–85 mm in females. Both wings beneath without distinct dark longitudinal streaks on the folds between the veins and without dark longitudinal streaks in the cell of the hindwing. Both wings with submarginal spots. The discal spot of cellule 1 b of the forewing never reaches the base of the cellule. Hindwing usually with free discal spots in cellules 2—5 and with a broad basal transverse band, which covers the greater part of the cell and the base of cellules 1 c, 2, 6 and 7. Forewing always with discal spots in cellules 1 b, 3, 7 and 8, and usually also with small ones in 2, 4, 5 and 6; the cell mostly with three spots. — leonidas F. (= similis Cr.) (7 d). All the spots light blue (male) or bluish white (female); forewing without discal spot in cellule 1 a; the submarginal spots of both wings large; the discal spot of cellule 4 of the forewing is proximally rounded and does not reach the base of the cellule. Sierra Leone, Delagoa Bay, British East Africa. In ab. (?) interniplaga Auriv. the forewing has a large discal onidale. spot in cellule 1 a, otherwise it is similar to the preceding form. German East Africa, ab. (?) onidale Suf. has the light basal part of the hindwing sprinkled with black scales, the veins in that part are margined with black and the spots in cellules 1 c and 2 are small or entirely wanting; otherwise similar to the form leonidas. German East Africa: Muanza. — brasidas Fldr. (7 d). Here the spots on the upper surface are small, white or yellowish white; the submarginal spots dot-like. No discal spot in cellule 1 a of the forewing. Angola to Natal. — umanus R. & J. differs from all the preceding in that the light basal transverse band of the hindwing only extends as far as the base of vein 2. Abyssinia. — pelopidas Oberth. The spots of the forewing light bluish, on an average somewhat larger than in leonidas, the discal spot in cellule 4 reaches the base of the cellule, the basal transverse band of the hindwing is very broad and almost pure white, but the submarginal spots are small, dot-like, not larger than the discal spots. A little known form as yet, perhaps a separate species, although it agrees very closely with leonidas in the markings. German East Africa and Pemba Island.

== Biology ==
Has continuous broods, peaking from October to April. The larvae feed on Popowia caffra, Annona, Monanthotaxis, Uvaria, Monanthotaxis caffra, Annona senegalensis, Landolphia ugandensis, L. buchannani, Annickia chlorantha, Friesodielsia obovata, Uvaria and Artabotrys species.

== Subspecies ==
- Graphium leonidas leonidas (Sub-Saharan Africa)
- Graphium leonidas pelopidas (Oberthür, 1879) (Tanzania: islands of Unguja and Pemba)
- Graphium leonidas santamarthae (Joicey & Talbot, 1927) (São Tomé and Príncipe: Principe)
- Graphium leonidas thomasius (Le Cerf, 1924) (São Tomé and Príncipe: Sao Tome)
- Graphium leonidas zanzibaricus Kielland, 1990 Tanzania

Torben Larsen developed a species numbering system for his 2005 publication Butterflies of West Africa. The nominate subspecies is #29. The 'Larsen' numbers have since been used with permission in A Sharp Eye on Butterflies of Ghana.

== Taxonomy ==
It is the nominal member of the leonidas-group of closely related and similar species (Graphium leonidas, Graphium levassori, Graphium cyrnus).

== Images ==
External images from Royal Museum of Central Africa.
