= Annickia polycarpa =

Conservation status
- Least Concern (IUCN 3.1)

Scientific classification
- Kingdom: Plantae
- Clade: Embryophytes
- Clade: Tracheophytes
- Clade: Spermatophytes
- Clade: Angiosperms
- Clade: Magnoliids
- Order: Magnoliales
- Family: Annonaceae
- Genus: Annickia
- Species: A. polycarpa

Binomial name
- Annickia polycarpa (DC.) Setten & Maas ex I.M.Turner

Synonyms
- Annona polycarpa DC.; Coelocline polycarpa (DC.) A.DC.; Enantia polycarpa (DC.) Engl. & Diels; Melodorum polycarpum (DC.) Benth.; Unona polycarpa DC.; Xylopia polycarpa (DC.) Oliv.; Xylopicrum polycarpum (DC.) Kuntze

Species of plant

Annickia polycarpa is a species of flowering plant in the Annonaceae family. It is commonly known as African Yellow Wood. It is small to medium-sized tree found in evergreen forests of tropical West Africa and Cameroon.

== Description ==
Annickia polycarpa is a small to medium-sized tree capable of reaching 20 meters tall and 40 cm in diameter. Bark is usually smooth and occasionally, somewhat rough, fairly thick, with fibrous inner bark, black to greenish in color. Petiole is sparsely pubescent, 3–8 mm long; leaf-blade is oblong, elliptical or obovate in outline with a papery surface, 5–27 cm long and 4–8 cm wide, acuminate at the apex and rounded at the base, covered with stellate hairs below. Solitary flowers on young shoots, pedicel is 0.9-1.9 cm long; sepal: three, triangular shaped, pubescent on the outside, inside is slightly pubescent, petals: yellow when fresh, elliptic in outline, up to 3 cm long. Flowering season is between July and August.

== Distribution ==
It grows in the Upper and Lower Guinean forests of west and west-central Africa, from Guinea to Cameroon. In Ivory Coast it grows as an understorey in dense forests.

== Chemistry ==
Bark extracts shows presence of quinolic and isoquinolic class of alkaloids; compounds extracted from leaves and bark of the species have been reported to contain corydaldine, aporphinoids, berberines and protoberberine groups of alkaloids, .

== Uses ==
Bark extracts are used by herbalists in traditional treatment of malaria related symptoms, ulcers and leprous spots. Stem bark is used for constructing huts, and a yellow dye obtained from the species is used for dyeing cloths, mats and leather.
