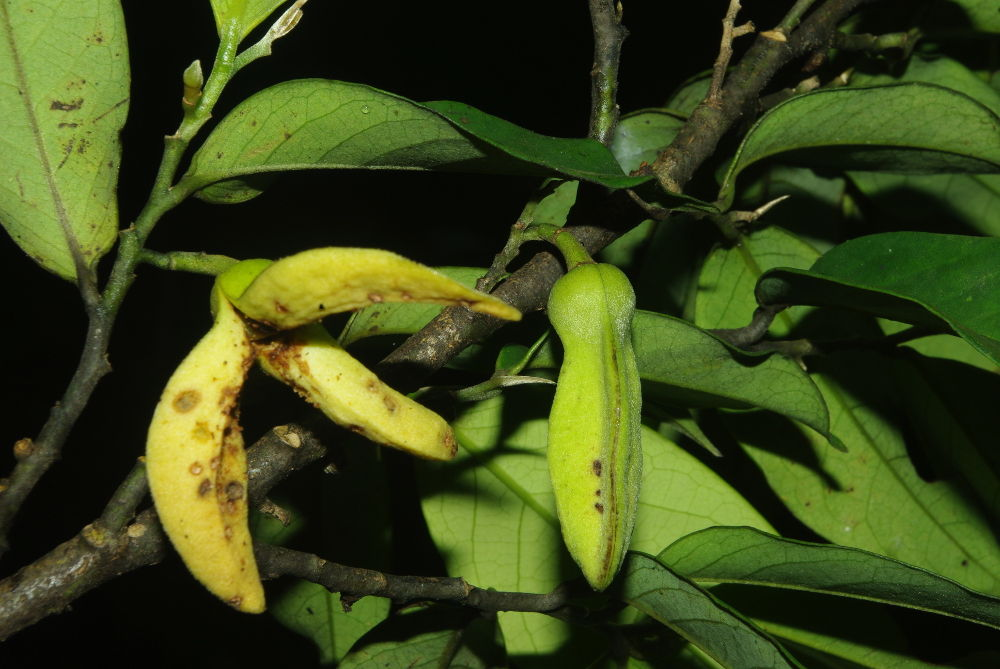

Conservation status
- Least Concern (IUCN 3.1)

Scientific classification
- Kingdom: Plantae
- Clade: Embryophytes
- Clade: Tracheophytes
- Clade: Spermatophytes
- Clade: Angiosperms
- Clade: Magnoliids
- Order: Magnoliales
- Family: Annonaceae
- Genus: Annickia
- Species: A. affinis

Binomial name
- Annickia affinis (Exell) Versteegh & Sosef

Synonyms
- Enantia affinis Exell; Enantia chlorantha var. soyauxii Engl. & Diels

= Annickia affinis =

Species of plant

Annickia affinis is small to medium sized tree that grows up to 30m tall, it belongs to the Annonaceae family. Also known as the African yellow wood, it is widely used in Central Africa and parts of West Africa in the treatment of various diseases. Both Annickia affinis and Annickia chlorantha are widely studied and sometimes credited with the name Enantia chrlorantha.

== Description ==
Straight, cylindrical trunk, about 80 cm in diameter. Bark, smooth, grey-brown - blackish. Leaf; petiole, 8-12 mm, leaf-blade, 3.5 x 27 cm long and 1.5 x 9 cm wide, narrowly elliptic to obovate, acuminate or acute at apex and cuneate at the base; glabrous upper surface, glossy dark green when fresh to grey/brown - black when dry; lower surface pubescent, pale green when fresh to greenish/brown - deep brown, short, simple, bifid or trifid hairs directed towards the apex.

== Distribution ==
Commonly occurs between 50 and 650 metres elevation in primary, secondary and degraded forests of the Lower Guinean forests in southern Nigeria, Cameroon, the Republic of the Congo, Cabinda Province of Angola, and Democratic Republic of the Congo.

== Uses ==
Wood obtained from the species is used to make canoe paddles and furniture while the bark is suitable making straps for carrying baskets and as a material in building huts. Stem bark extracts are an important ingredient in decoctions to treat malaria and a host of other ailments. Dye obtained from the bark is also used for dyeing fibre and cotton.
