= Acraea quirina =

Common glassy acraea
- male A. q. quirina, Ghana

Scientific classification
- Kingdom: Animalia
- Phylum: Arthropoda
- Clade: Pancrustacea
- Class: Insecta
- Order: Lepidoptera
- Family: Nymphalidae
- Genus: Acraea
- Species: A. quirina

Binomial name
- Acraea quirina (Fabricius, 1781)

Synonyms
- Papilio quirina Fabricius, 1781; Acraea (Acraea) quirina; Papilio dice Drury, 1782; Acraea quirina f. bourgeoni Schouteden, 1919

Species of butterfly

Acraea quirina, the common glassy acraea, is a butterfly in the family Nymphalidae. It is found in Senegal, Gambia, Guinea, Sierra Leone, Burkina Faso, Liberia, Ivory Coast, Ghana, Togo, Nigeria, Cameroon, Gabon, the Republic of the Congo, the Central African Republic, Angola, the Democratic Republic of the Congo, Sudan, Uganda, Ethiopia, Kenya, Tanzania and Malawi.

== Description ==
A. quirina F. (53b). Forewing diaphanous without markings, only in la and at the base of lb scaled with red-yellow or red. Hindwing rose-red to orange-yellow with free basal and discal dots and at the edge of the red-yellow colour often with submarginal dots in all the cellules; marginal band broad and diaphanous. In the female the red-yellow colour is usually replaced by dirty yellow-grey. Sierra Leone to British East Africa. - rosa Eltr. only differs in having the basal part of the forewing above scaled with red or red-yellow rosa. to the apex of the cell and almost to the anal angle. British East Africa.

== Subspecies ==
- Acraea quirina quirina (south-eastern Senegal, Gambia, Guinea, Sierra Leone, Burkina Faso, Liberia, Ivory Coast, Ghana, Togo, Nigeria, Cameroon, Gabon, Congo, Central African Republic, Angola, Democratic Republic of the Congo, southern Sudan, Uganda, western Kenya, western Tanzania)
- Acraea quirina rosa Eltringham, 1912 (Ethiopia, northern and eastern Kenya, eastern Tanzania, Malawi)

== Biology ==
The habitat consists of forests, extending into the Guinea savanna.

Both sexes mud-puddle during very dry periods.

The larvae feed on Rinorea elliotii, Rinorea subintegrifolia, Rinorea poggei, Rinorea convallariflora and Drypetes species.

Torben Larsen developed a species numbering system for his 2005 publication Butterflies of West Africa. This species is #1184. The 'Larsen' numbers have since been used with permission in A Sharp Eye on Butterflies of Ghana.

== Taxonomy ==
It is a member of the Acraea terpsicore species group - but see also Pierre & Bernaud, 2014

- Acraea (group ranavalona) Henning, 1993, Metamorphosis 4 (1): 11
- Acraea (Acraea) (subgroup quirina) Pierre & Bernaud, 2013, Butterflies of the World 39: 5
