= Abantis nigeriana =

Scientific classification
- Domain: Eukaryota
- Kingdom: Animalia
- Phylum: Arthropoda
- Class: Insecta
- Order: Lepidoptera
- Family: Hesperiidae
- Genus: Abantis
- Species: A. nigeriana

Binomial name
- Abantis nigeriana Butler, 1901

Species of butterfly

Abantis nigeriana, the Nigerian paradise skipper, is a butterfly in the family Hesperiidae. It is found in Senegal, the Gambia, Burkina Faso, Guinea, Ghana, Nigeria, southern Sudan and Gabon. The habitat consists of Guinea savanna.

== Subspecies ==
- Abantis nigeriana nigeriana (Senegal, Gambia, Burkina Faso, Guinea, Ghana to northern Nigeria)
- Abantis nigeriana rougeoti Berger, 1959 (Gabon)
