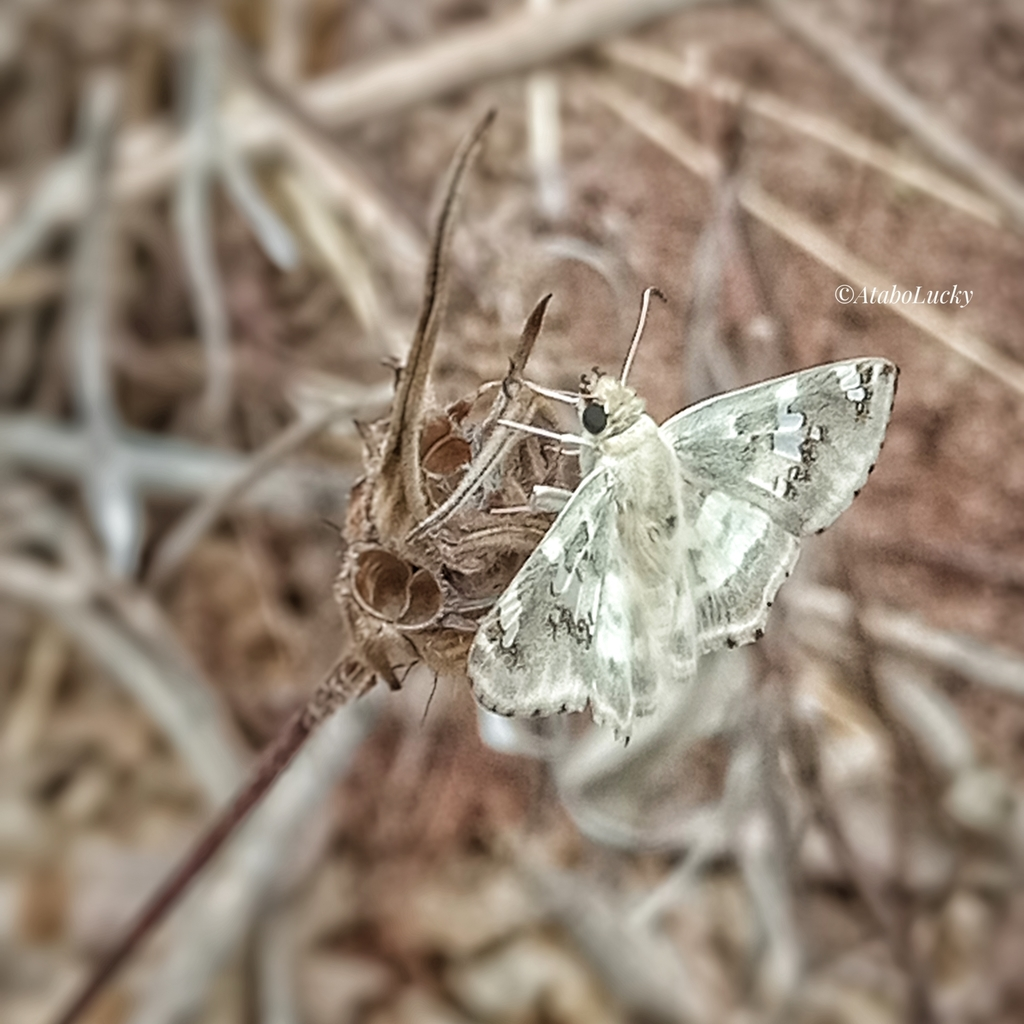

Scientific classification
- Kingdom: Animalia
- Phylum: Arthropoda
- Clade: Pancrustacea
- Class: Insecta
- Order: Lepidoptera
- Family: Hesperiidae
- Genus: Abantis
- Species: A. adelica

Binomial name
- Abantis adelica (Karsch, 1892)

Synonyms
- Caprona adelica Karsch, 1892

= Abantis adelica =

Species of butterfly

Abantis adelica, the western ragged skipper, is a butterfly in the family Hesperiidae. It is found in Senegal, Burkina Faso, Guinea, Ghana, Togo, northern Nigeria, north-western Kenya, the Democratic Republic of the Congo (Shaba), Malawi and possibly southern Sudan, Ethiopia and Uganda. The habitat consists of Guinea savanna.

Adults feed from the flowers of Tridax species.

The larvae possibly feed on Grewia species
