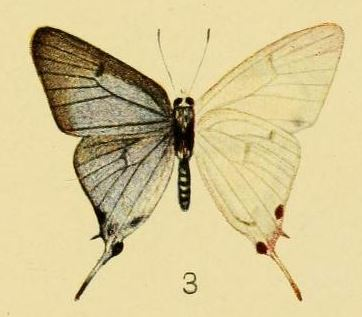

Scientific classification
- Kingdom: Animalia
- Phylum: Arthropoda
- Class: Insecta
- Order: Lepidoptera
- Family: Lycaenidae
- Genus: Iolaus
- Species: I. alienus

Binomial name
- Iolaus alienus (Trimen, 1898)

Synonyms
- Epamera alienus Trimen, 1898; Jolaus bicaudatus Aurivillius, 1905

= Iolaus alienus =

Species of butterfly

Iolaus alienus, the brown-line sapphire, is a butterfly of the family Lycaenidae. It is found in most of Sub-Saharan Africa.

The wingspan is 33–37 mm for males and 35–40 mm for females. Adults are on wing from August to November (with a peak in September) and sometimes again from April to May in South Africa. There are two generations per year.

Larvae have been reported on Loranthus species. The larvae of subspecies I. a. alienus feed on Tapinanthus brunneus, Tapinanthus subulatus, Oliverella rubroviridis and Helixanthera kirkii.

== Subspecies ==
- Iolaus alienus alienus (from KwaZulu-Natal and Transvaal to Mozambique, Zimbabwe, Zambia, Malawi, southern Tanzania)
- Iolaus alienus bicaudatus Aurivillius, 1905 (northern Cameroon, northern Nigeria, Upper Volta)
- Iolaus alienus ugandae Stempffer, 1953 (Kenya, Uganda, southern Sudan)
- Iolaus alienus sophiae Henning & Henning, 1991
