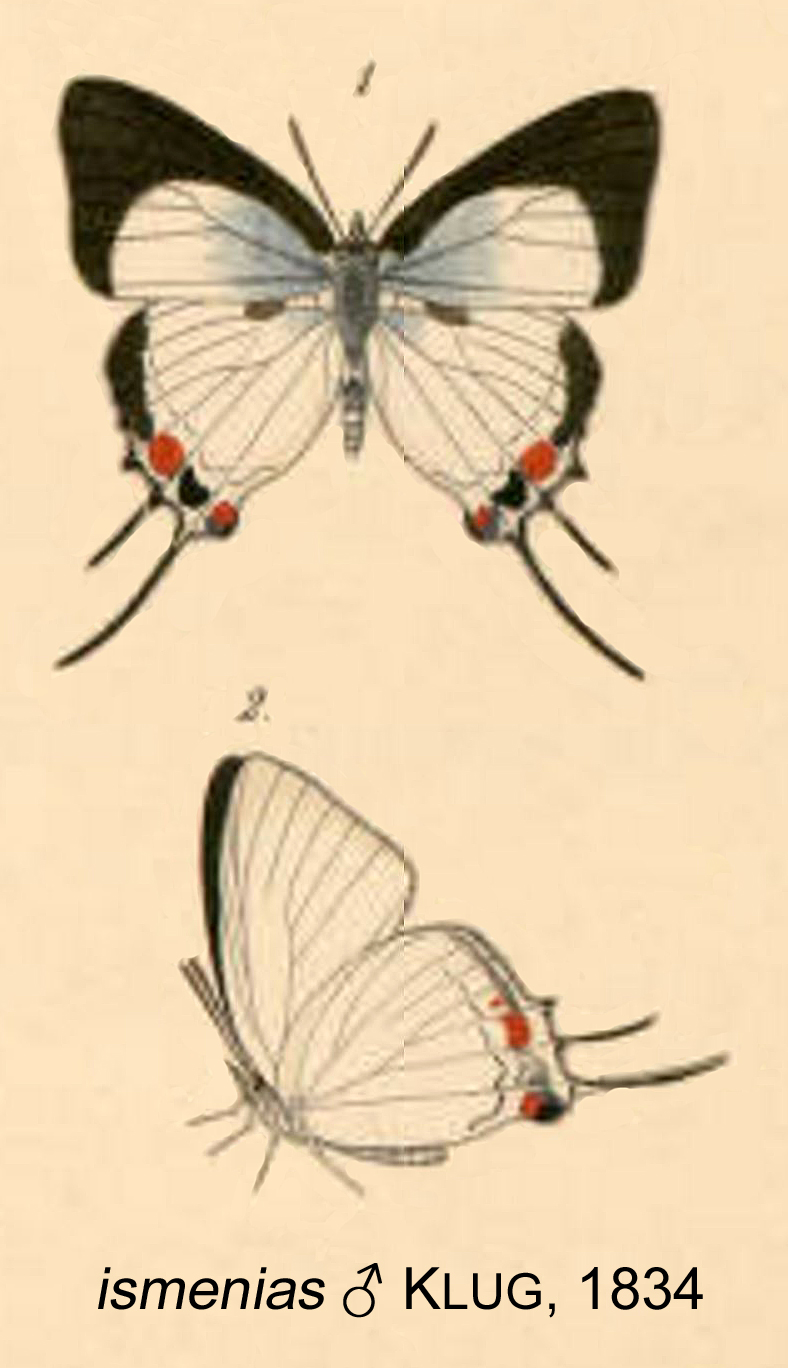

Scientific classification
- Kingdom: Animalia
- Phylum: Arthropoda
- Class: Insecta
- Order: Lepidoptera
- Family: Lycaenidae
- Genus: Iolaus
- Species: I. ismenias

Binomial name
- Iolaus ismenias (Klug, 1834)

Synonyms
- Lycaena ismenias Klug, 1834; Iolaus (Philiolaus) ismenias

= Iolaus ismenias =

Species of butterfly

Iolaus ismenias, the white sapphire, is a butterfly in the family Lycaenidae. It is found in Senegal, Guinea-Bissau, Burkina Faso, Ivory Coast, Ghana, Togo, Nigeria, Cameroon, the Democratic Republic of the Congo, Sudan, Uganda and Ethiopia. The habitat consists of dry savanna.

The larvae feed on Loranthus species.

== Subspecies ==
- Iolaus ismenias ismenias (Senegal, Guinea-Bissau, Burkina Faso, Ivory Coast, Ghana, Togo, northern Nigeria, northern Cameroon, Democratic Republic of the Congo, southern Sudan, Uganda)
- Iolaus ismenias piaggiae Oberthür, 1883 (Ethiopia)
