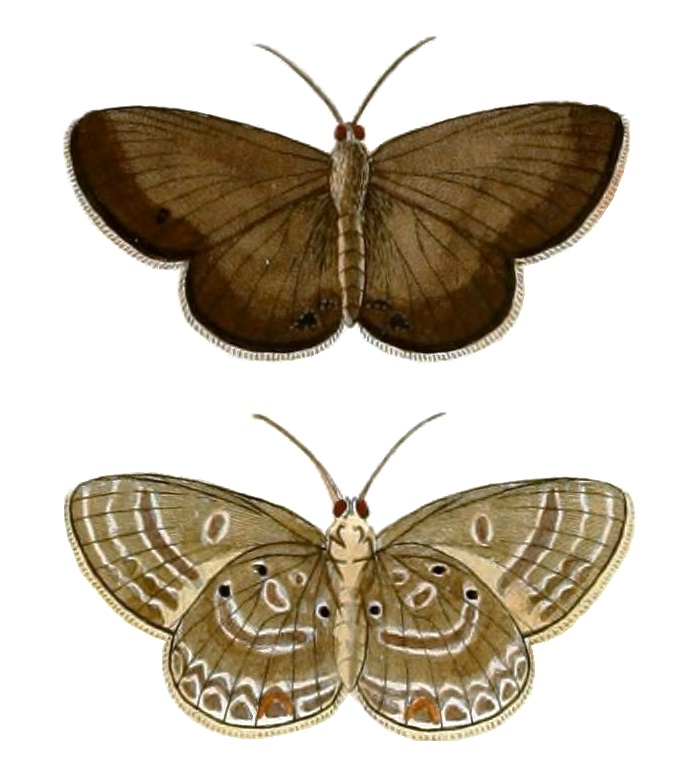

Scientific classification
- Kingdom: Animalia
- Phylum: Arthropoda
- Class: Insecta
- Order: Lepidoptera
- Family: Lycaenidae
- Genus: Lepidochrysops
- Species: L. parsimon

Binomial name
- Lepidochrysops parsimon (Fabricius, 1775)

Synonyms
- Papilio parsimon Fabricius, 1775; Neochrysops parsimon; Papilio celaeus Stoll, 1781; Lepidochrysops nigeriae Stempffer, 1957

= Lepidochrysops parsimon =

Species of butterfly

Lepidochrysops parsimon, the western giant Cupid, is a butterfly in the family Lycaenidae. It is found in Guinea, Sierra Leone, southern Burkina Faso, Ivory Coast, Ghana, Togo, western Nigeria, Cameroon and the Central African Republic. The habitat consists of the forest/savanna transition zone.
