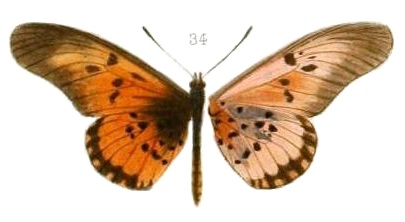
- A. perenna thesprio, male imago from Zanzibar in Oberthür (1893)
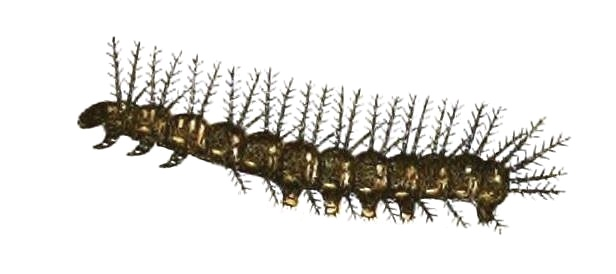
- A. perenna perenna, late instar larva from Lagos in Eltringham (1912)

Scientific classification
- Kingdom: Animalia
- Phylum: Arthropoda
- Clade: Pancrustacea
- Class: Insecta
- Order: Lepidoptera
- Family: Nymphalidae
- Genus: Acraea
- Species: A. perenna

Binomial name
- Acraea perenna Doubleday, 1847

Synonyms
- Acraea (Actinote) perenna; Acraea polydectes Ward, 1871; Acraea thesprio Oberthür, 1893; Acraea perenna ab. usagara Strand, 1913

= Acraea perenna =

Falcate acraea

Species of butterfly

Acraea perenna, the falcate acraea, is a butterfly in the family Nymphalidae which is native to the African tropics and subtropics.

== Range ==
It is found in Senegal, Sierra Leone, Liberia, Ivory Coast, Ghana, Togo, Nigeria, Cameroon, the Republic of the Congo, Angola, the Democratic Republic of the Congo, Uganda, Kenya, Ethiopia, Tanzania, Malawi and Zambia.

== Description ==
A. perenna Dbl. and Hew. (54 e) is distinguished by the long, narrow forewing, with the termen emarginate, almost exactly the same shape as in Papilio antimachus; the discal dots are large and on the hindwing are placed near the base of their cellules (the one in 3 seems to be always absent); forewing above black with yellow-red hindmarginal spot, which covers the middle of cellules 1a to 2, beneath lighter, at the distal margin broadly yellowish with black veins and stripes on the interneural folds. Hindwing above black nearly to the discal dots, then with red transverse band and at the distal margin with black, red-spotted marginal band, beneath much lighter, at the base greenish yellow with free dots and some red spots or stripes close to the base; marginal band as above. Larva black with yellow spots; head and spines black. Sierra Leone to Angola, Uganda and Nairobi.

- In thesprio Oberth. (54 e) the red-yellow colour of the forewing more or less completely covers also the cell and the base of cellules 3 to 6. Katanga; Nyassaland; German and British East Africa.
- kaffana Rothsch. (59 f) nearly agrees with thesprio, but has the discal dots larger and the marginal band of the hindwing broader. Abyssinia.

== Subspecies ==
- Acraea perenna perenna — Senegal, Sierra Leone, Liberia, Ivory Coast, Ghana, Togo, Nigeria, Cameroon, Congo, Angola, Democratic Republic of the Congo, Uganda, central Kenya, north-western Zambia
- Acraea perenna kaffana Rothschild, 1902 — Ethiopia
- Acraea perenna thesprio Oberthür, 1893 — coast of Kenya, eastern Tanzania, Malawi

Torben Larsen developed a species numbering system for his 2005 publication Butterflies of West Africa. The nominate subspecies is #1139. The 'Larsen' numbers have since been used with permission in A Sharp Eye on Butterflies of Ghana.

== Biology ==
The habitat consists of forests and forest-savanna mosaic in hilly country.

It is thought to be the main mimicry model for Graphium ridleyanus.

The larvae feed on Kolobopetalum chevalieri, Olobopetalum, Mikania (including M. saggitifera), Bridelia (including B. micrantha), Adenia and Urera species.

== Taxonomy ==
It is a member of the Acraea circeis species group – but see also Pierre & Bernaud, 2014
