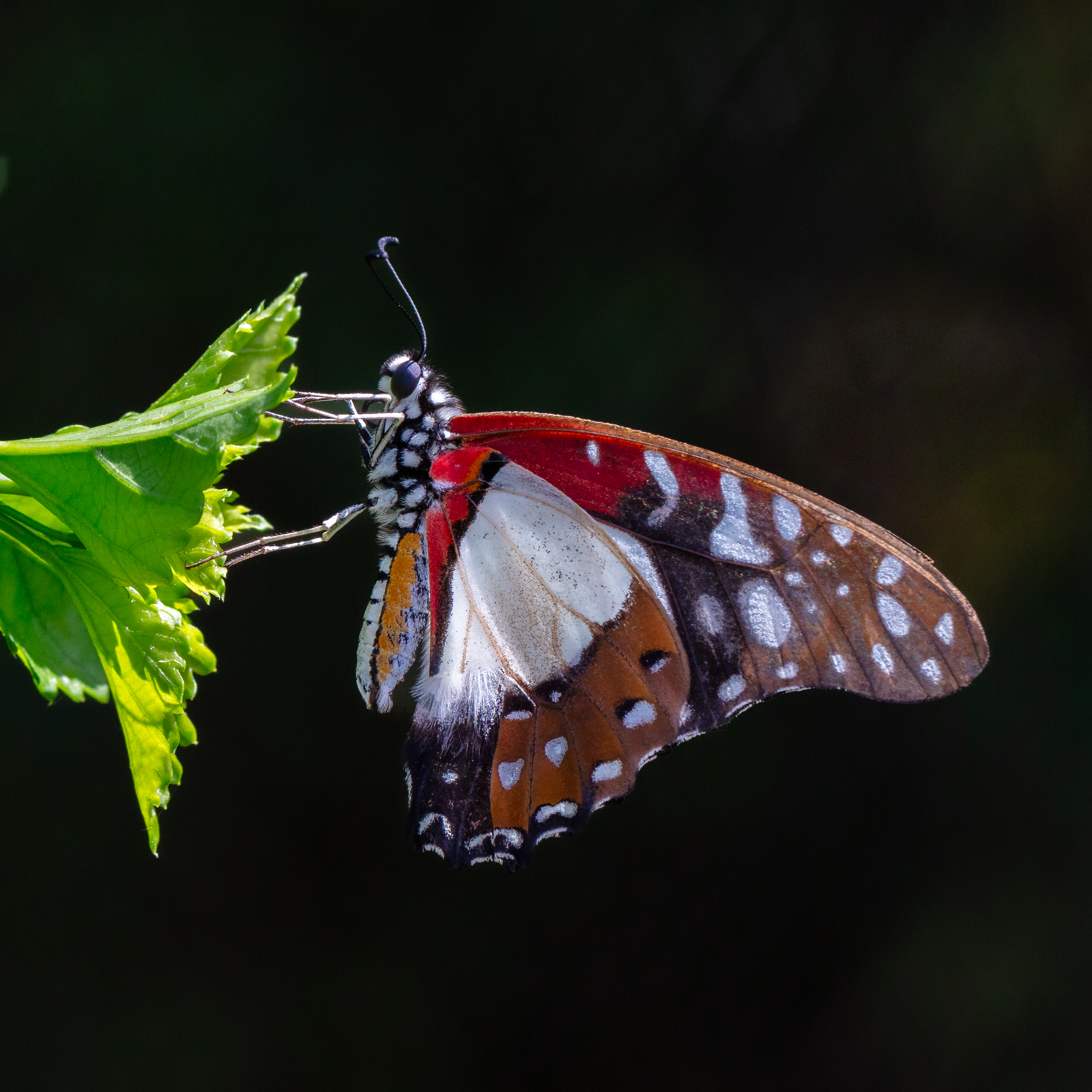

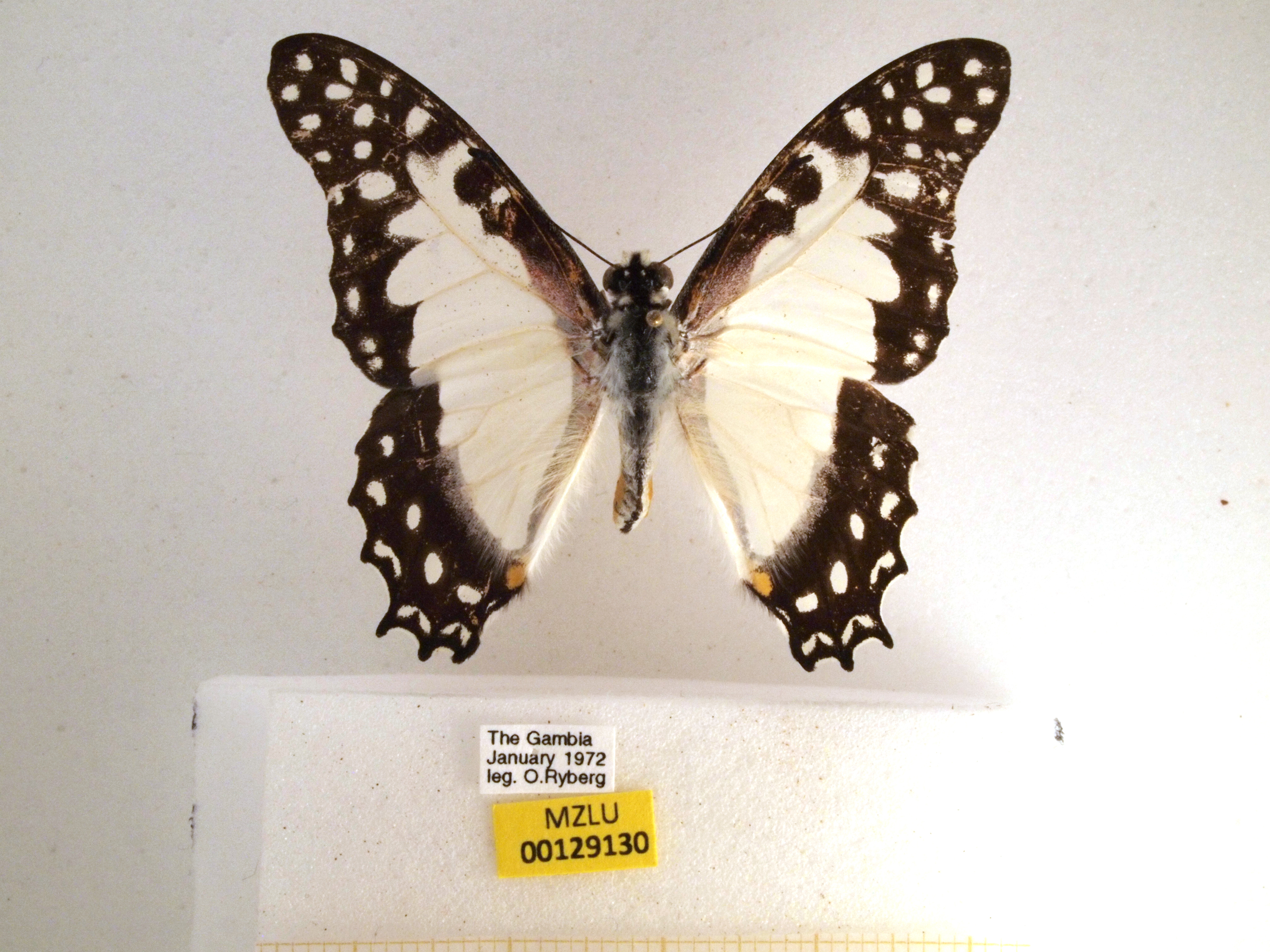

Scientific classification
- Kingdom: Animalia
- Phylum: Arthropoda
- Clade: Pancrustacea
- Class: Insecta
- Order: Lepidoptera
- Family: Papilionidae
- Genus: Graphium
- Species: G. angolanus

Binomial name
- Graphium angolanus (Goeze, 1779).

Subspecies
- See text

Synonyms
- Papilio angolanus Goeze, 1779; Graphium pylades; Papilio corinneus Bertoloni, 1850; Papilio anthemenes Wallengren, 1857; Papilio pylades lapydes Suffert, 1904; Papilio pylades angolanus ab. kitungulua Strand, 1911; Papilio pylades-angolanus ab. hypochroa Boullet & Le Cerf, 1912; Papilio angolanus ab. spoliatus Schultze, 1913; Papilio (Cosmodesmus) pylades angolanus ab. dawanti Dufrane, 1946; Papilio (Cosmodesmus) pylades angolanus ab. wansoni Dufrane, 1946; Papilio (Cosmodesmus) pylades angolanus ab. jottrandi Dufrane, 1946; Papilio (Cosmodesmus) pylades angolanus ab. deficiens Dufrane, 1946; Papilio (Cosmodesmus) pylades angolanus ab. blariauxi Dufrane, 1946; Papilio (Cosmodesmus) pylades angolanus ab. addenda Dufrane, 1946; Graphium angolanus howelli Turlin & Lequeux, 1992; Graphium angolanus howelli f. jozani Turlin & Lequeux, 1992; Papilio corineus; Papilio pylades baronis Ungemach, 1932; Papilio pylades Fabricius, 1793; Papilio (Cosmodesmus) pylades pylades ab. houzeaui Dufrane, 1946; Graphium calabar Hancock, 1985

= Graphium angolanus =

Species of butterfly

Graphium angolanus, the Angola white lady, is a species of butterfly in the family Papilionidae (swallowtails). It is found in Sub-Saharan Africa.

== Description ==
The wingspan is 65–70 mm in males and 70–75 mm in females.Hindwing tailless, angled at the extremities of the veins. Frons with a white or red dot or streak at each side. Palpi white. Wings above white and black, beneath at the base red or red-brown. The underside of the wings has the same white ground-pattern in all the species [of this group]. On the forewing this consists of 8 submarginal spots placed close to the margin; 9 discal spots (in 1 a—8), of which those of cellules 5, 6 and 8 are almost always small and double, and four transverse spots or bands in the cell. The hindwing has beneath a broad white transverse band, which at the costal margin extends at least to vein 2, covers almost the whole of the cell and is separated from the white inner marginal area lb by a dark longitudinal streak in cellule 1 c. In the broad, dark submarginal band the hindwing has 6 submarginal spots, of which those of cellules 1—4 are sometimes divided, and 3—4 subdiscal spots in cellules 2— 5; these may also be double and arranged in two rows. The hairs of the inner marginal fold of the hindwing of the 3 are long and yellowish white. Diagnostic- Apex of the cell of the forewing with two white spots, one in the upper and one in the lower angle. Hindwing beneath without red spots in the marginal band; both wings above with white spots in the marginal band.The discal spot in cellule 3 is entirely absent or is small and quite free, not reaching the base of the cellule; cell of the forewing without white hindmarginal spot or with only a very small one. Abdomen with a broad yellow lateral stripe at each side.From the Congo region southwards to Natal and eastwards to British East Africa, ab. lapydes Suff. only differs from angolanus in that the cell of the forewing has a hindmarginal spot, which however only reaches vein 3; German East Africa: Kilossa. The full- grown larva has not only on the first and the penultimate segment, but also on the second and third two widely separated spines. The long hump on the mesothorax of the pupa is obliquely inclined forwards and extends almost as far as the tip of the head. External images from Royal Museum of Central Africa.

== Biology ==
The fight period is year-round, peaking in November and February.

The caterpillars feed on Annona senegalensis, Sphedamnocarpus pruriens, Uvaria species, Landolphia buchannani, and Landolphia ugandensis.

== Subspecies ==
- Graphium angolanus angolanus (Angola, southern Democratic Republic of the Congo, coast of Kenya, Tanzania, Malawi, Zambia, Mozambique, Zimbabwe, northern Botswana, northern Namibia, South Africa, Eswatini, Comoros)
- Graphium angolanus baronis Ungemach, 1932(Senegal, Gambia, Guinea-Bissau, Guinea, Sierra Leone, Ivory Coast, Mali, Burkina Faso, Ghana, Togo, Benin, Niger, Nigeria, São Tomé and Príncipe, Cameroon, Congo, Central African Republic, Democratic Republic of the Congo, Chad, Sudan, Uganda, Rwanda, Burundi, Ethiopia, western Kenya, Tanzania)

Torben Larsen developed a species numbering system for his 2005 publication Butterflies of West Africa. The subspecies baronis is #20. The 'Larsen' numbers have since been used with permission in A Sharp Eye on Butterflies of Ghana.

== Taxonomy ==
Graphium angolanus belongs to a clade with six members. All have similar genitalia. The pattern is black with white marks above and with brick-red areas beneath. In G. endochus the white areas above are extensive and cover most of the wings and in G. ridleyanus the marks are usually bright red not white. The clade members are:

- Graphium angolanus (Goeze, 1779)
- Graphium endochus (Boisduval, 1836)
- Graphium morania (Angas, 1849)
- Graphium taboranus (Oberthür, 1886)
- Graphium schaffgotschi (Niepelt, 1927)
- Graphium ridleyanus (White, 1843)

== Realm ==
Afrotropical realm

== See also ==
- Guinean Forests of West Africa
- Congolian forests
