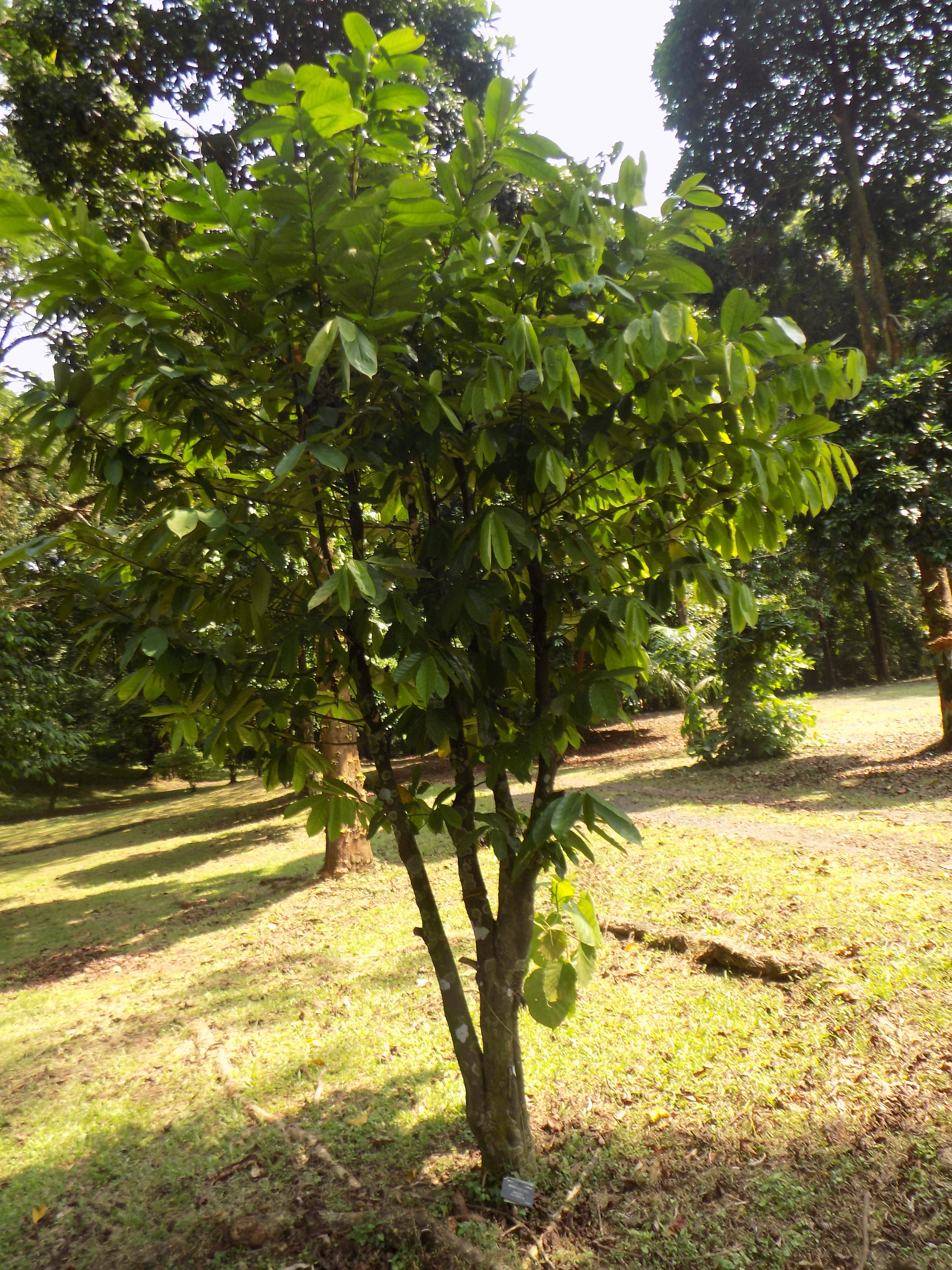

Conservation status
- Least Concern (IUCN 3.1)

Scientific classification
- Kingdom: Plantae
- Clade: Embryophytes
- Clade: Tracheophytes
- Clade: Spermatophytes
- Clade: Angiosperms
- Clade: Magnoliids
- Order: Magnoliales
- Family: Annonaceae
- Genus: Annickia
- Species: A. chlorantha

Binomial name
- Annickia chlorantha (Oliv.) Setten & Maas

Synonyms
- Enantia chlorantha Oliv.

= Annickia chlorantha =

Species of tree

Annickia chlorantha is a tree that grows up to 25 meters tall, it belongs to the Annonaceae family. It is native to Liberia in west Africa and from Nigeria to the Democratic Republic of the Congo in west-central Africa. It is an important tree used in traditional medical practices for the treatment of malaria and various diseases in Nigeria and Cameroon; oil extracted from stem barks and leaves of the species and Annickia affinis, its more common close kin have been widely studied.

The species is sometimes credited by the generic name, Enantia chlorantha.

== Taxonomy ==
Named after Annickia Le Thomas, the genus Annickia belonging to the Annonaceae family was preceded by Enantia Oliv. (1867). Further research unearthed Enantia as a legitimate genus of the Sabiaceae family, first published by Falconer in 1842. A revision in 1990 changed the title of the genus Enantia to become the genus Annickia. Both Annickia chlorantha and Annickia affinis are closely related medical trees and many traditional practice users and some researchers do not distinguish between the two with the latter crediting both with the name Enantia chlorantha.

== Description ==
Leaf-blades are papery to coriaceous, narrowly elliptical to obovate in outline, blades range between 7 - 28 cm long and 2 - 9.5 cm wide, acuminate at apex and narrowly cuneate at base. Slightly discolorous; adaxial surface is rarely pubescent and is usually brown to grey green but glossy dark green when fresh while the lower surface is bright brown to green but whitish to pale green when fresh with bifid or trifid hairs pointing in all directions.

== Distribution ==
Occurs in lowland forests and along road sides in southern Nigeria and Cameroon.

== Uses ==
Stem bark and occasionally root decoction of Annickia chlorantha and its closely related cousin, Annickia affinis is used to treat symptoms associated with malaria, tuberculosis, jaundice, yellow fever, typhoid and hepatitis A, B and C.
