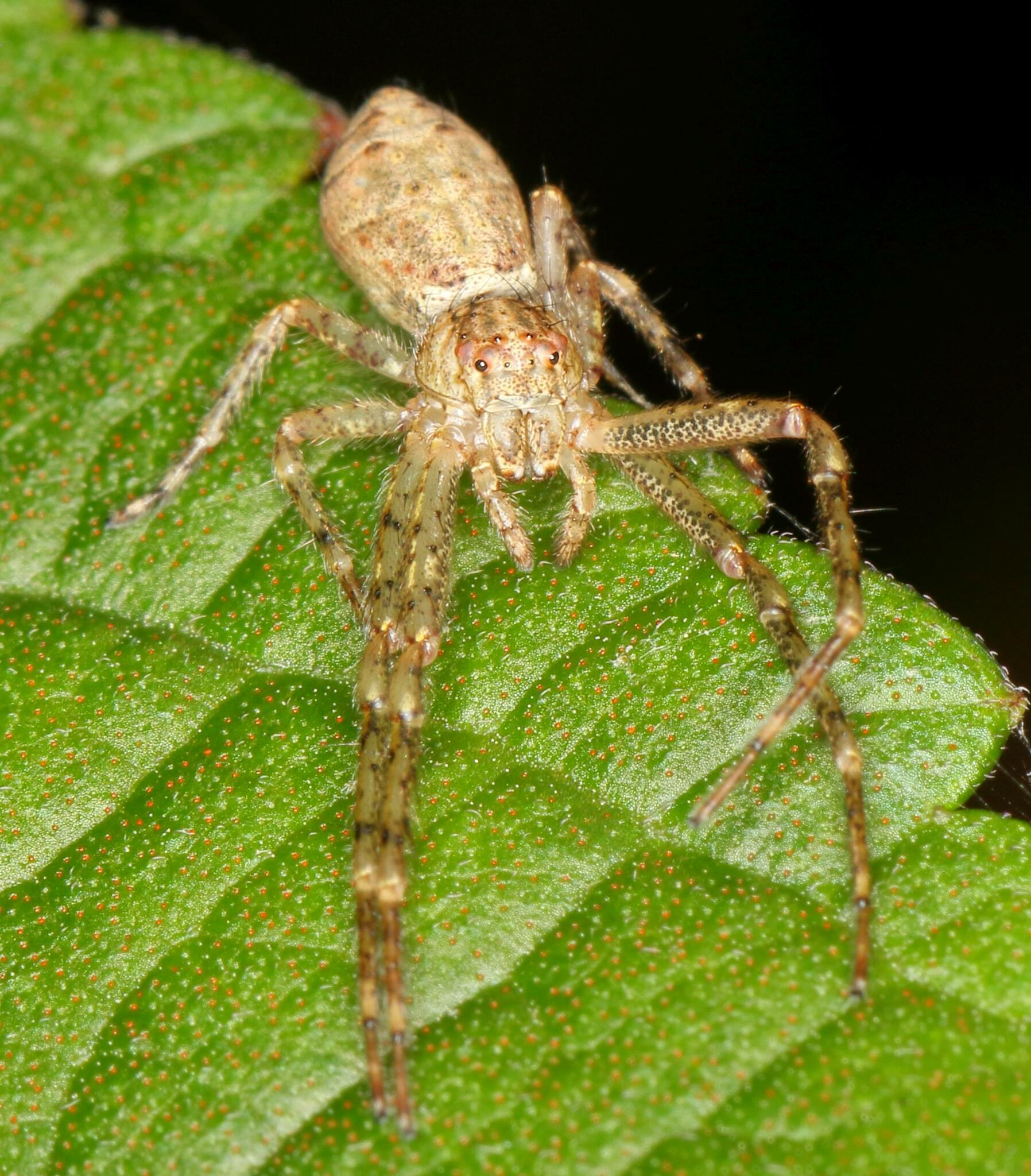
- female from South Africa
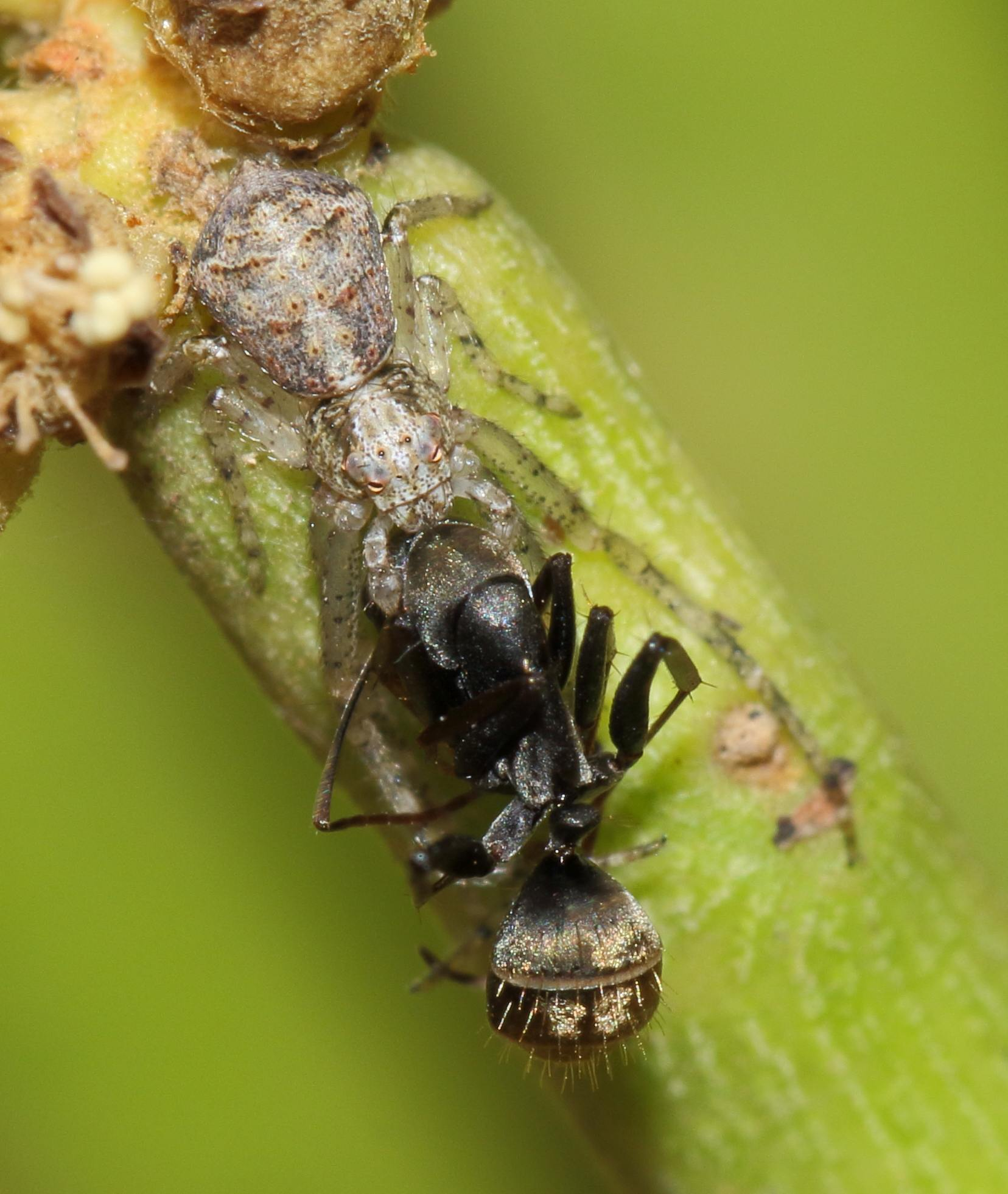
- with ant prey

Conservation status
- Least Concern (IUCN 3.1)

Scientific classification
- Kingdom: Animalia
- Phylum: Arthropoda
- Subphylum: Chelicerata
- Class: Arachnida
- Order: Araneae
- Infraorder: Araneomorphae
- Family: Thomisidae
- Genus: Tmarus
- Species: T. cameliformis

Binomial name
- Tmarus cameliformis Millot, 1942

Synonyms
- Tmarus bonneti Lessert, 1943

= Tmarus cameliformis =

Humped tree crab spider

Species of crab spider

Tmarus cameliformis is a species of crab spider in the family Thomisidae. It is widely distributed across sub-Saharan Africa.

== Taxonomy ==
Tmarus cameliformis was first described by Jacques Millot in 1942 from a female specimen collected in French Guinea. The species was later found to be conspecific with Tmarus bonneti, described by Lessert in 1943 from Zaire (now Democratic Republic of the Congo), with the synonymy established by Dippenaar-Schoeman in 1985.

The genus name Tmarus is derived from Ancient Greek, while the specific epithet cameliformis refers to the camel-like shape of the opisthosoma, which may bear distinct tubercles resembling a camel's humps.

== Distribution ==
Tmarus cameliformis has been recorded from eight African countries: Botswana, Democratic Republic of the Congo, Eswatini, Ghana, Guinea, Malawi, South Africa, and Tanzania. In South Africa, it occurs in all provinces except those with desert and succulent karoo biomes.

== Habitat ==
The species is found on trees where it uses cryptic coloration to blend with bark and foliage. It has been recorded from various native trees including Burkea africana, Combretum molle, Dombeya rotundifolia, Grewia flavescens, and Vachellia xanthophloea, as well as cultivated crops such as avocado, citrus, cotton, and macadamia. The species occurs across multiple biomes but is absent from desert, Nama and succulent Karoo biomes.

== Description ==
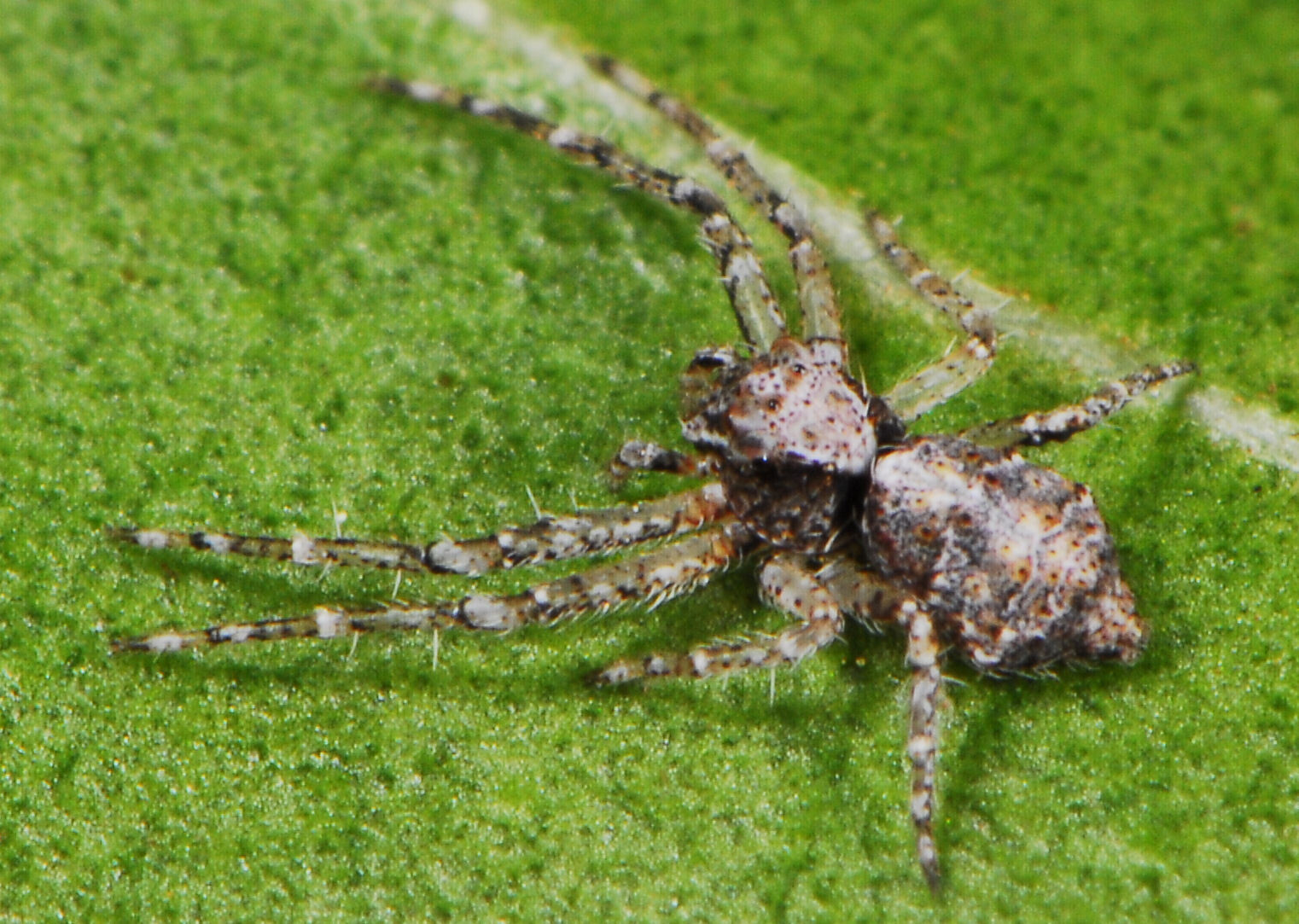
female

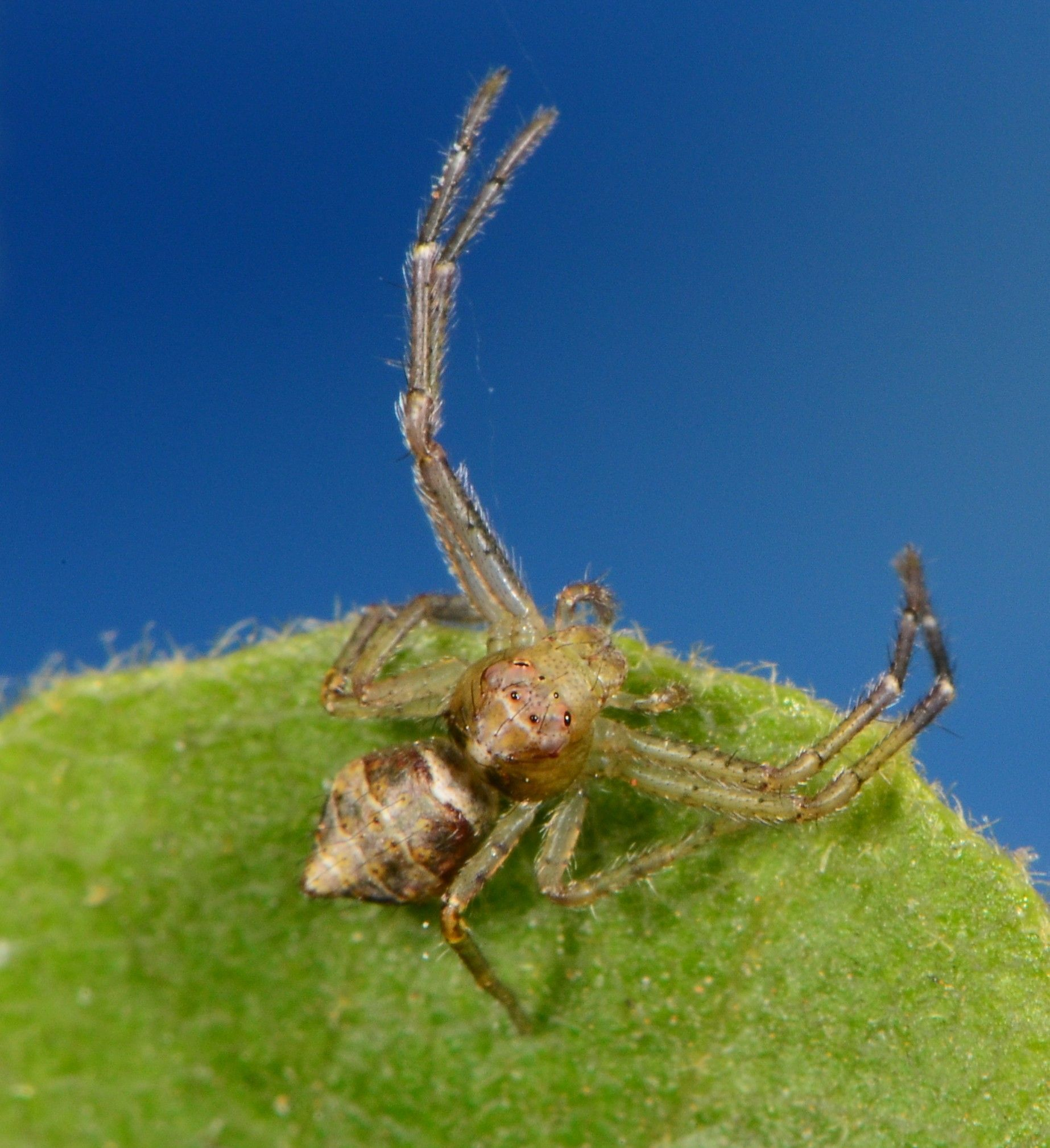
female

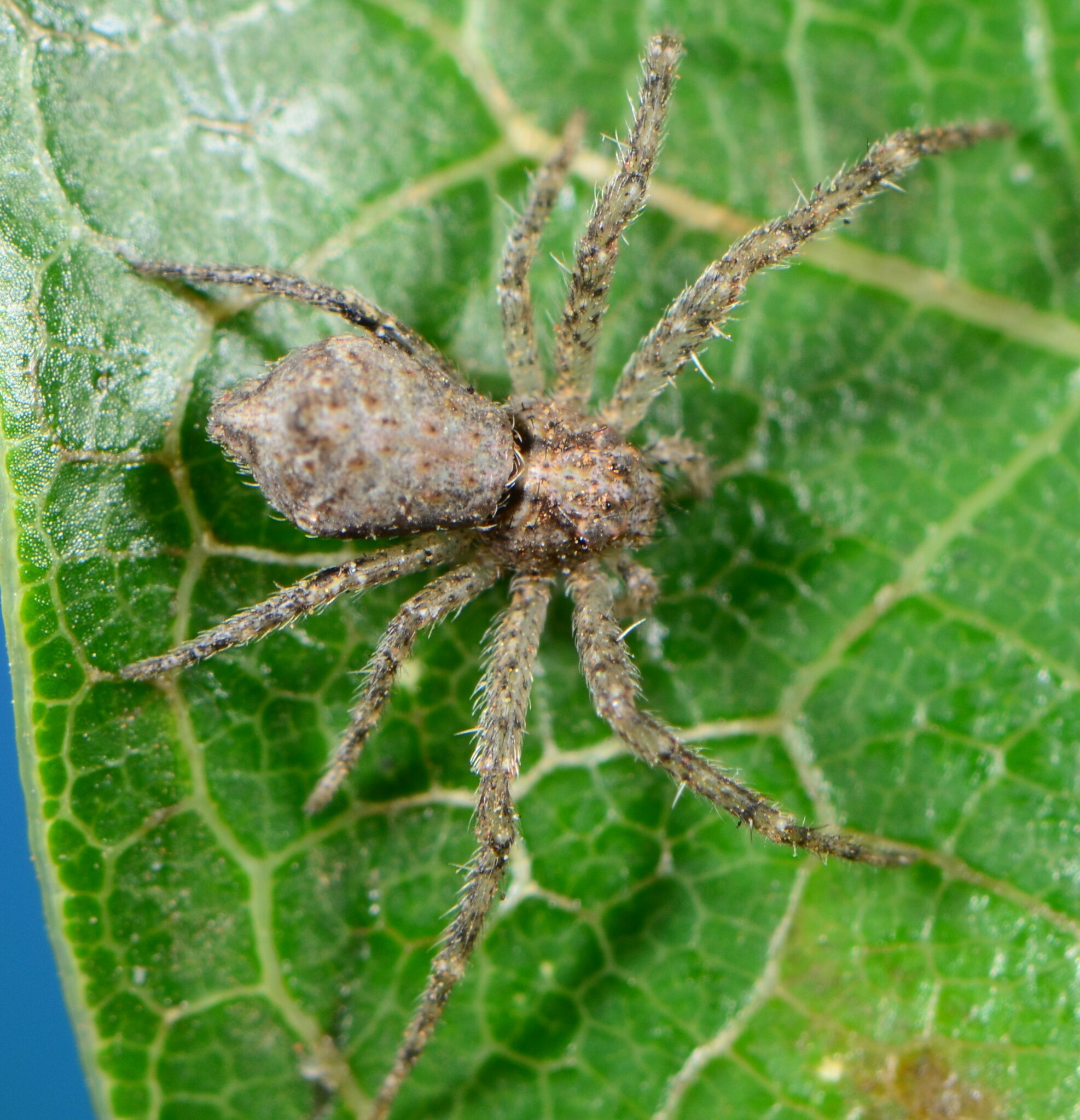
juvenile female

Tmarus cameliformis exhibits considerable variation in size and morphology. Females are larger than males, with a total length ranging from 4.4–4.8 mm compared to 3.0–3.7 mm in males.

The cephalothorax is typically brown to greyish white with a network of pale striae on the thoracic region. The cephalic area is mottled with white, and dark brown lines may be present. The opisthosoma varies in color from greyish white to brown, often mottled with black markings. Some individuals display black lateral lines or transverse bands on the widest part of the abdomen.

A characteristic feature of this species is the variable presence of abdominal tubercles, which can range from completely absent to very distinct, giving some specimens a camel-like appearance that inspired the species name. The carapace is wider than long and bears numerous dark setae. The legs are relatively short and fawn-colored with brown punctuation, and the fourth patella typically shows a dark patch on its upper surface.

In females, the epigyne is simple, consisting of two rounded to ovate lobes, with the spermathecae visible externally. Males have a characteristic pedipalp structure with a forked ventral tibial apophysis and a long, thin retrolateral tibial apophysis.

== Conservation status ==
Tmarus cameliformis is classified as Least Concern due to its wide geographical range and presence in multiple protected areas across southern Africa. The species faces no significant known threats and is protected in more than ten protected areas.
