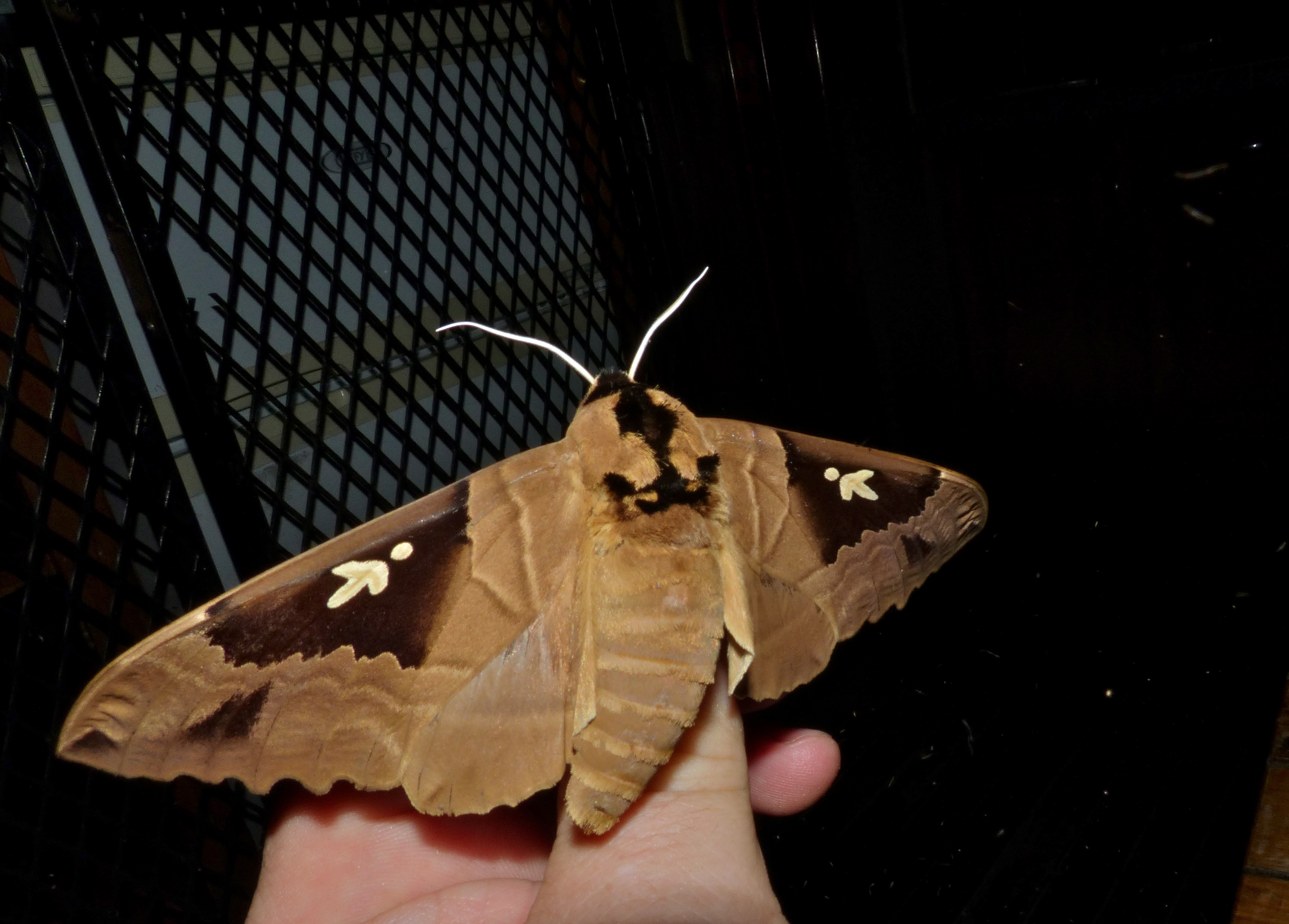

Scientific classification
- Domain: Eukaryota
- Kingdom: Animalia
- Phylum: Arthropoda
- Class: Insecta
- Order: Lepidoptera
- Family: Sphingidae
- Genus: Lophostethus
- Species: L. dumolinii

Binomial name
- Lophostethus dumolinii (Angas, 1849)

Synonyms
- Sphinx dumolinii Angas, 1849

= Lophostethus dumolinii =

Species of moth

Lophostethus dumolinii is a moth of the family Sphingidae. It is known from most habitats, except desert and high mountains throughout the Ethiopian Region, excluding Madagascar and the Cape in South Africa.

The length of the forewings is 55–70 mm for males and 70–75 mm for females and the wingspan is 130–171 mm.

The larvae feed on Ficus, Milletia aboensis, Hibiscus tiliaceus, Hibiscus micranthus, Hibiscus panduriformis, Dombeya rotundifolia, Dombeya cymosa, Carissa macrocarpa, Andersonia, Grewia bicolor and Grewia occidentalis.

== Subspecies ==
- Lophostethus dumolinii dumolinii
- Lophostethus dumolinii carteri - Rothschild, 1894 (western Africa)
- Lophostethus dumolinii congoicum - Clark, 1937 (Congo, Uganda)
