= Phyllonorycter grewiella =

Scientific classification
- Kingdom: Animalia
- Phylum: Arthropoda
- Class: Insecta
- Order: Lepidoptera
- Family: Gracillariidae
- Genus: Phyllonorycter
- Species: P. grewiella

Binomial name
- Phyllonorycter grewiella (Vári, 1961)

Synonyms
- Lithocolletis grewiella Vári, 1961

Species of moth

Phyllonorycter grewiella is a moth of the family Gracillariidae. It is known from South Africa, Botswana, Kenya, Namibia and coastal Yemen. The habitat consists of the coastal savannahs of southern and East Africa and the forests belonging to the Zanzibar-Inhambane floristic region.

The length of the forewings is 2.4–2.8 mm. Adults have been reared and collected during every month of the year except August, October and December.

The larvae feed on Grewia bicolor, Grewia flava, Grewia flavescens, Grewia hexamita, Grewia messinica, Grewia monticola and Grewia villosa. They mine the leaves of their host plant.
