= Anaphe =

Anaphe may refer to:

- Anaphe (city), an ancient Greek island and city-state
- Anaphe (moth), a genus of moths
