= Arapha =

Arapha may be:

- an incorrect name for Anaphe, a genus of moths
- an alternative name for Rapha, a minor Biblical figure

== See also ==
- Arrapḫa, an ancient city in Mesopotamia
- Arafa
