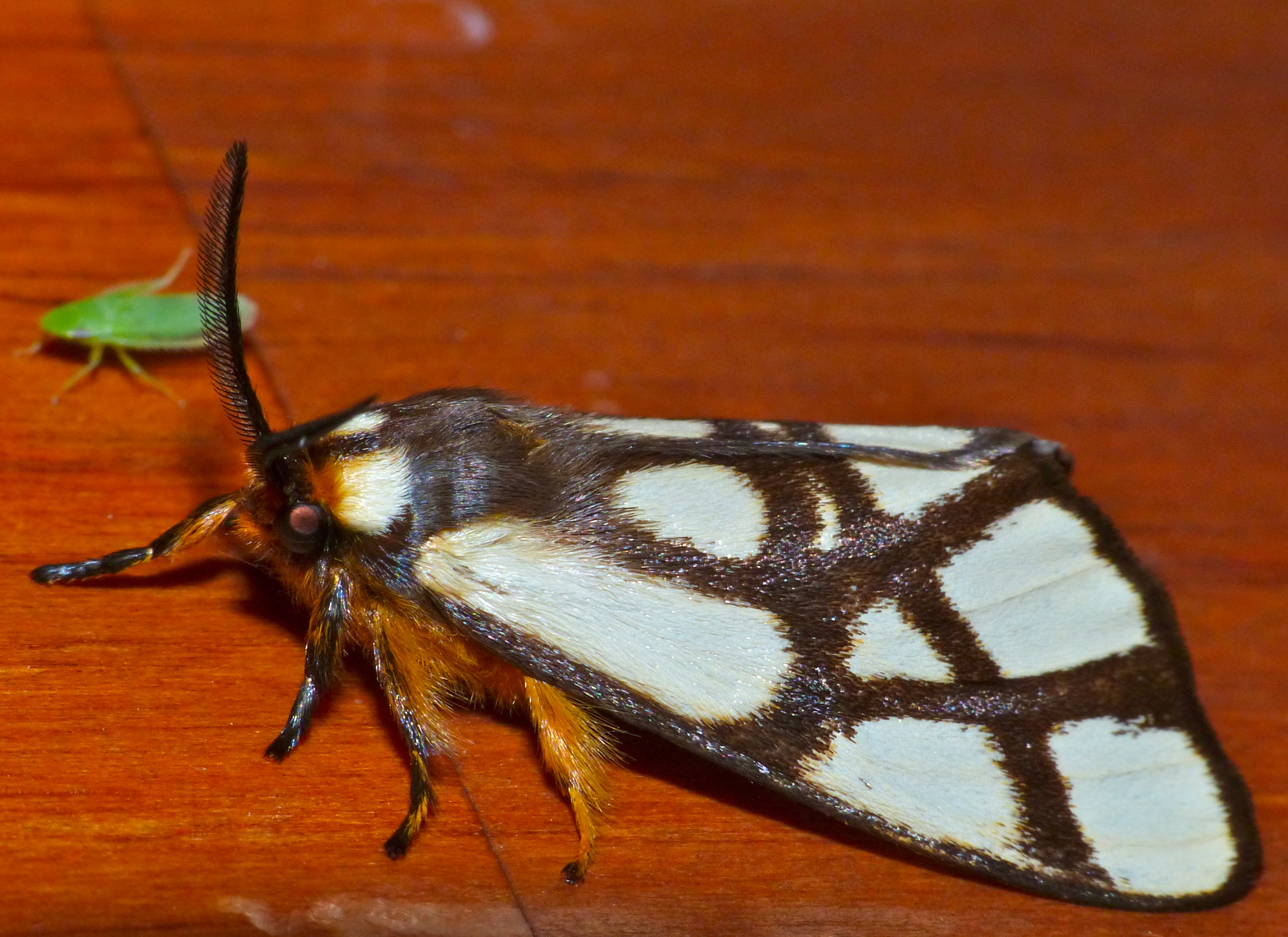

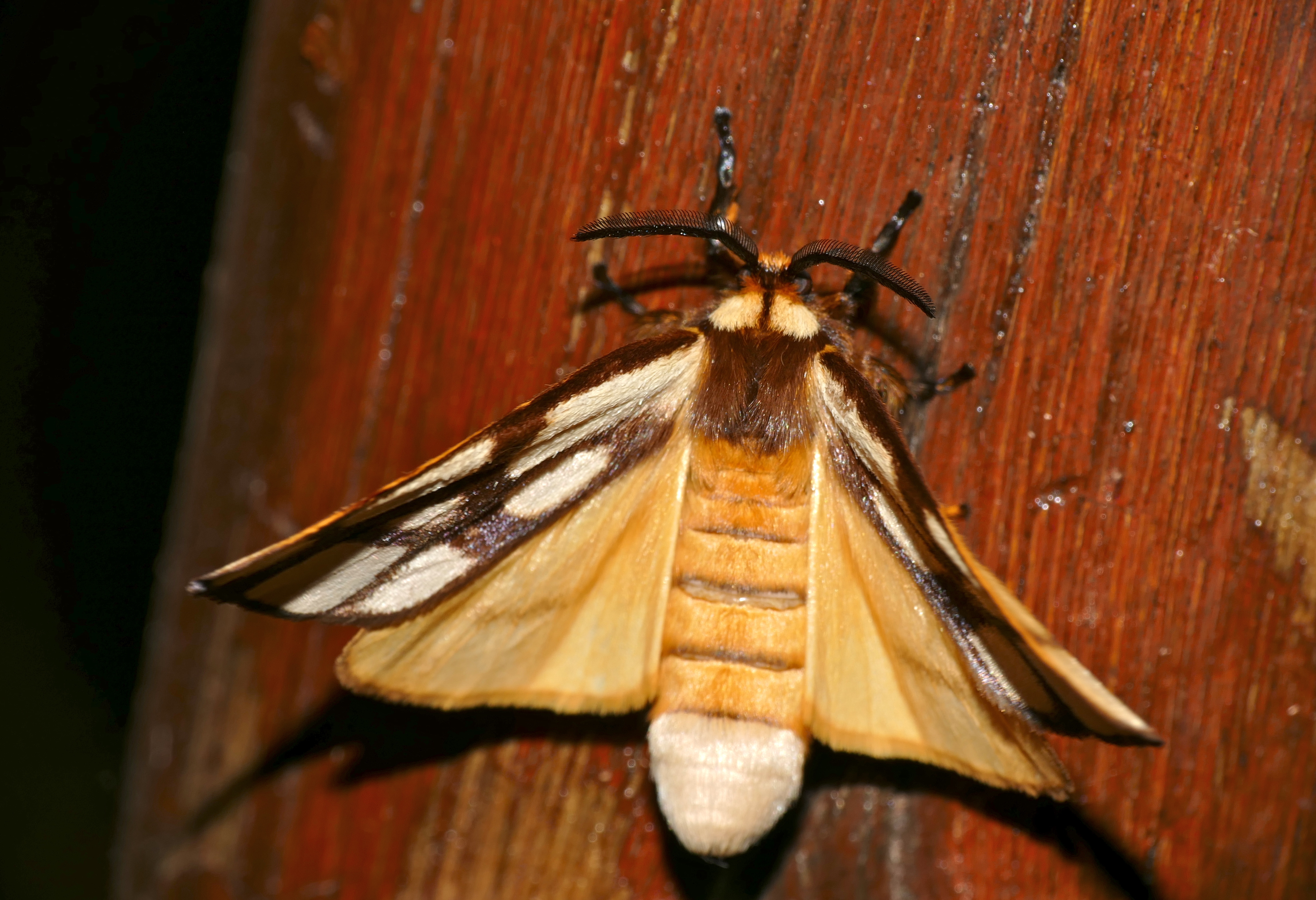
- imago

Scientific classification
- Kingdom: Animalia
- Phylum: Arthropoda
- Class: Insecta
- Order: Lepidoptera
- Superfamily: Noctuoidea
- Family: Notodontidae
- Genus: Anaphe
- Species: A. reticulata

Binomial name
- Anaphe reticulata Walker, 1855

Synonyms
- Anaphe ambrizia Butler, 1877; Arctiomorpha euprepiaeformis Herrich-Schäffer, 1855

= Anaphe reticulata =

Reticulate bagnest

Species of moth

Anaphe reticulata, commonly known as the reticulate bagnest or reticulate bagnet, is a moth of the family Notodontidae which is native to savannah in sub-Saharan Africa. It was described by Francis Walker in 1855. It has been recorded from Angola, Eritrea, Ivory Coast, Malawi, Mozambique and South Africa. In southern Africa it is described as common and widespread. Anaphe panda is similar in appearance and habits.

There are two generations per year, and in southern Africa the gregarious foliage-feeding caterpillars are observed from January to March, and again from April to June. The hirsute olive green caterpillars are easily spotted on branches and leaves of their food plants, or when they are found precessing in single file along the ground or up woody plants. Allegedly the caterpillars' copious hair will cause a rash if touched. The caterpillars have been found to feed on Dombeya and Diplorhynchus condylocarpon in Zimbabwe, and on Dombeya rotundifolia, Grewia bicolor, Grewia flavescens and Pappea capensis in Mpumalanga and Limpopo, South Africa.

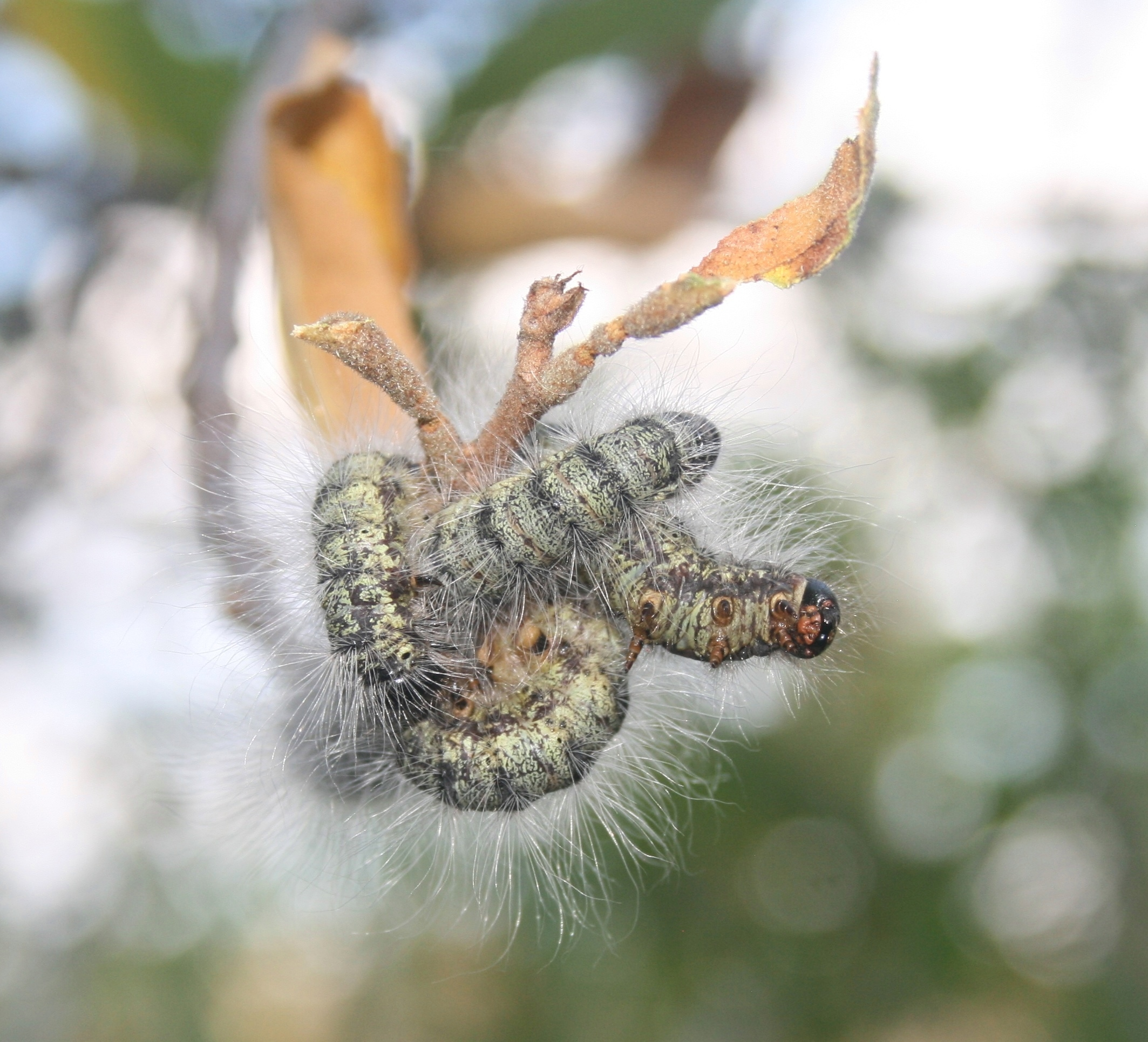
Caterpillars of A. reticulata feeding gregariously on Dombeya rotundifolia in Limpopo, South Africa
