= Diapalpus congregarius =

Scientific classification
- Domain: Eukaryota
- Kingdom: Animalia
- Phylum: Arthropoda
- Class: Insecta
- Order: Lepidoptera
- Family: Lasiocampidae
- Genus: Diapalpus
- Species: D. congregarius

Binomial name
- Diapalpus congregarius (Strand, 1913)

Species of moth

Diapalpus congregarius is a moth species of the family Lasiocampidae. It was first described in 1913 by Embrik Strand and is the type species of genus Diapalpus. It is found in the Democratic Republic of the Congo and Tanzania.

== Description ==
=== Immature stages ===
Larvae of Diapalpus congregarius are hairy, with a black body with a central yellow longitudinal stripe and a dark brown head with a broad yellow longitudinal line. Pupae are brown, held in a grey-white silk cocoon of approximately 30–40 mm length.

=== Imago ===
Adults have a wing span of 40–45 mm. Forewings are bright grey-brown, with a single dark dot in the cell. Hindwings are off-white with a narrow brown fringe.

== Behaviour ==
Diapalpus congregarius occurs in a single yearly generation, with adults on wing from November to January. Larvae pupate in densely packed fibrous nests hanging from twigs on a large variety of trees. Such nests are most commonly 10–30 cm long, but may reach a length of up to 60 cm and a width of 20 cm depending on the number of cocoons contained. Trees may hold several such nests.

=== Host plants ===
Larvae are polyphagous, nocturnal feeders, and are known to occur on species of Fabaceae (Acacia sp.), Caesalpiniaceae (Brachystegia sp.), Euphorbiaceae (Bridelia micrantha), Moraceae (Ficus sp.), Malvaceae (Gossypium sp.) and Poaceae (Pennisetum purpureum).
