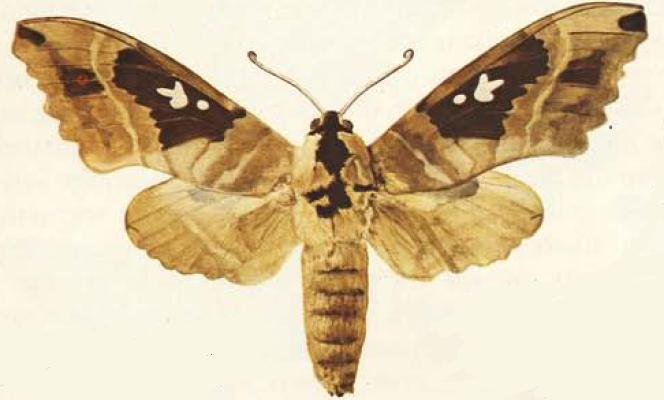
- Lophostethus dumolinii

Scientific classification
- Domain: Eukaryota
- Kingdom: Animalia
- Phylum: Arthropoda
- Class: Insecta
- Order: Lepidoptera
- Family: Sphingidae
- Tribe: Smerinthini
- Genus: Lophostethus; Butler, 1876

= Lophostethus =

Genus of moths

Lophostethus is a genus of moths in the family Sphingidae first described by Arthur Gardiner Butler in 1876.

== Species ==
- Lophostethus dumolinii (Angas, 1849)
- Lophostethus negus Jordan, 1926
