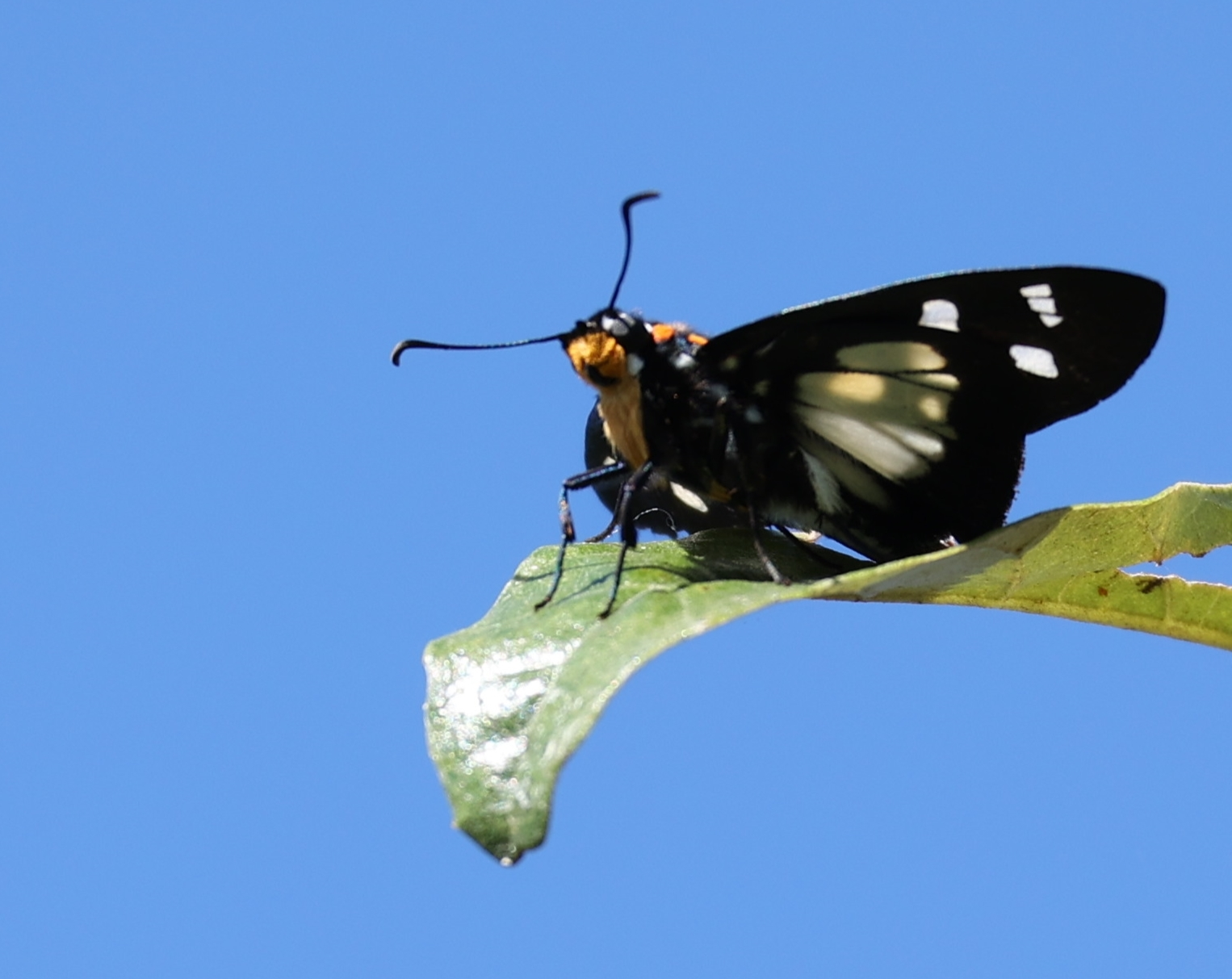
- Abantis paradisea, South Africa

Conservation status
- Least Concern (IUCN 3.1)

Scientific classification
- Kingdom: Animalia
- Phylum: Arthropoda
- Class: Insecta
- Order: Lepidoptera
- Family: Hesperiidae
- Genus: Abantis
- Species: A. paradisea

Binomial name
- Abantis paradisea (Butler, 1870)

Synonyms
- Leucochitonea paradisea Butler, 1870; Hesperia namaquana Westwood, 1874

= Abantis paradisea =

Species of butterfly

Abantis paradisea, the paradise skipper, is a butterfly of the family Hesperiidae. It is found in KwaZulu-Natal, Zululand, Transvaal, Eswatini, Zimbabwe and from Botswana to Somalia.

The wingspan is 40–45 mm (1.6–1.8 in) for males and 43–55 mm (1.7–2.2 in) for females. Adults are on wing year-round with peaks in autumn from April to June and in spring from August to November.

The larvae feed on Hibiscus tiliaceus, Cola natalensis, Annona species, Bridelia cathartica, Bridelia micrantha, Pseudolachnostylis maprouneifolia, Lonchocarpus capassa and Lecaniodiscus fraxinifolius.
