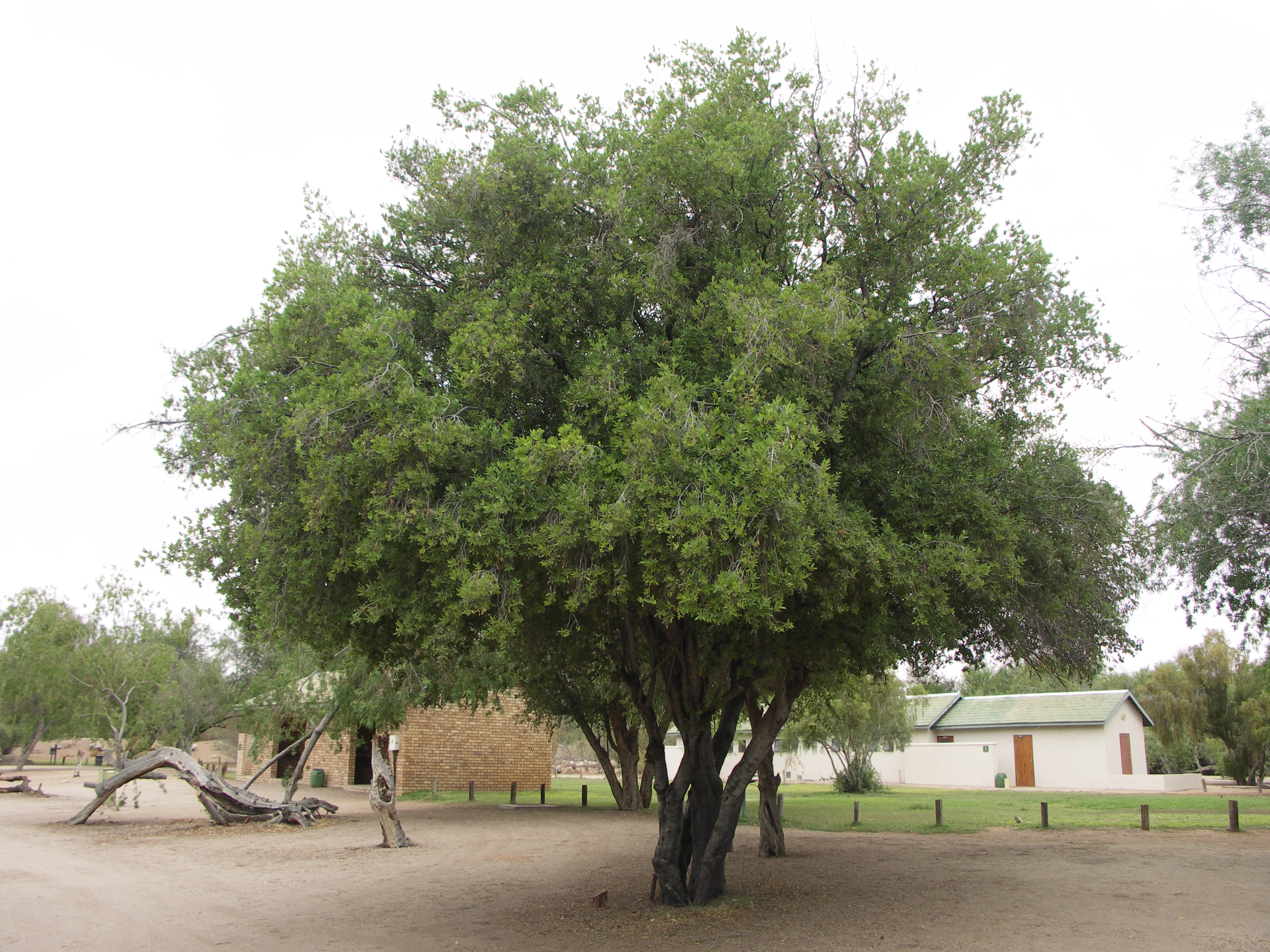

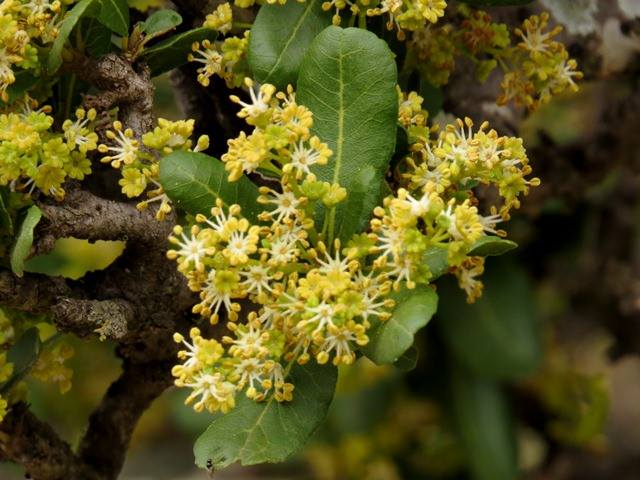

Scientific classification
- Kingdom: Plantae
- Clade: Tracheophytes
- Clade: Angiosperms
- Clade: Eudicots
- Clade: Rosids
- Order: Sapindales
- Family: Sapindaceae
- Subfamily: Sapindoideae
- Genus: Pappea; Eckl. & Zeyh.
- Species: P. capensis

Binomial name
- Pappea capensis Eckl. & Zeyh.

= Pappea =

Genus of trees

Pappea capensis is a South African tree in the family Sapindaceae. It is the only species in the genus Pappea.

== Common names ==
Common names include jacket plum, indaba tree and bushveld cherry. In other languages, it is known as: doppruim (Afrikaans); umQhokwane, umVuna, iNdaba (Zulu); iliTye, umGqalutye (Xhosa); mongatane, Mopsinyugane (Pedi); liLetsa (Swati); Xikwakwaxu, Gulaswimbi (Tsonga). Muva/kiva - kikamba Kenya

== Description ==
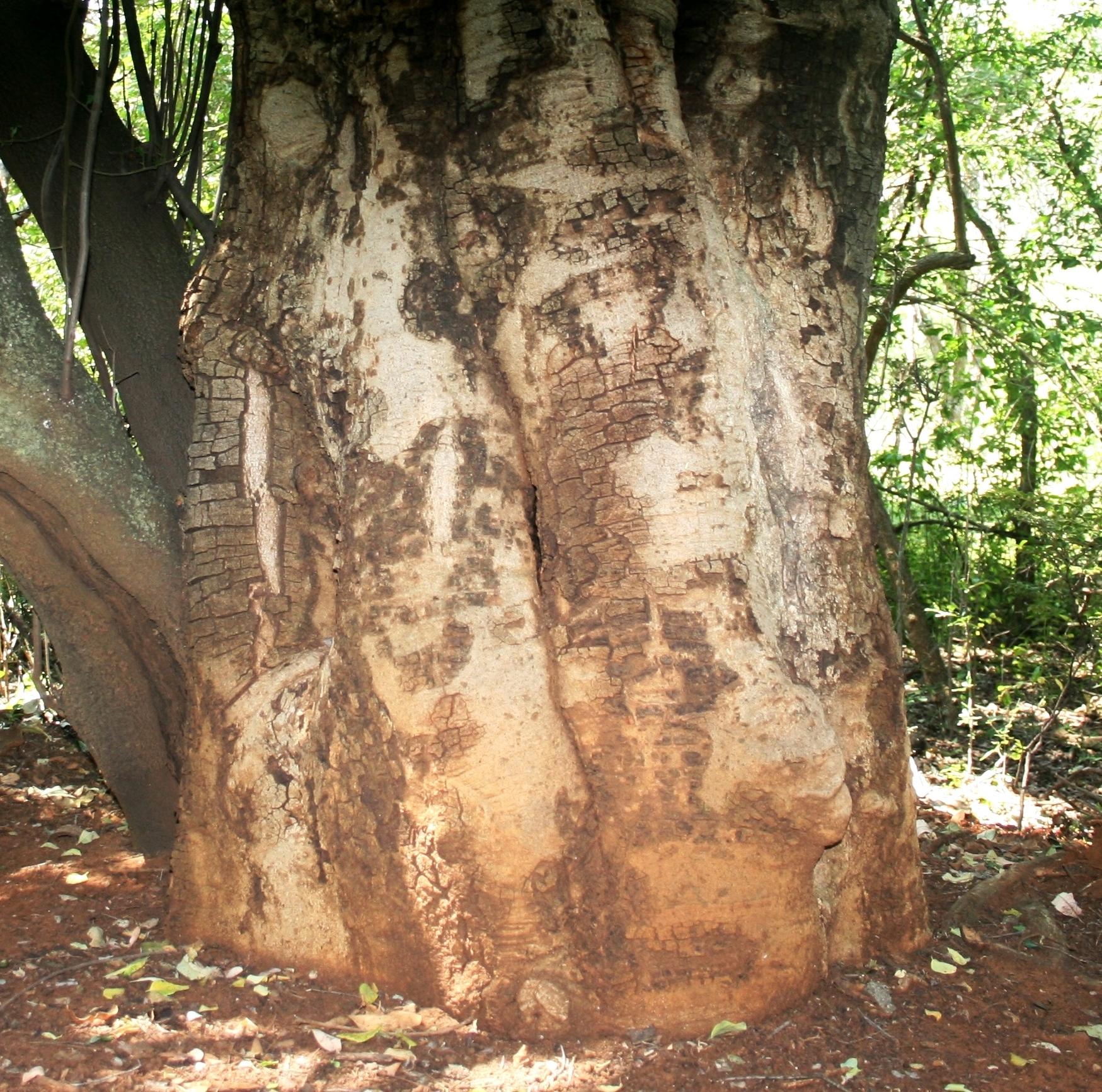
Trunk of a large specimen growing in a bush clump

The jacket plum (small to medium tree with a height of 7–13 metres or 23–43 feet) is a long-lived, hardy, evergreen.

The greenish flowers are borne on catkins in the axils of the leaves. Pappea capensis is monoecious with flowers going through a distinct male phase followed by an equally distinct female phase. The trees flower from September to May and the fruit is produced from February to July. The dense crown is popular with nesting birds as it provides good nesting sites.

The fruit are furry green capsule 10–15 millimetres (0.4–0.6 in) diameter that splits to yield an orange-red flesh containing a single black seed. The red fruit is eaten by birds, animals and humans. The jacket plum is related to the litchi.

The leaves are alternate, simple and oblong, hard-textured and wavy. The leaves are crowded at the ends of the branches The leaf margin changes from sharply toothed young growth to almost smooth in mature leaves.

== Distribution ==
Pappea is widespread in southern Africa from the Northern Cape through the drier Karoo, Eastern Cape, KwaZulu-Natal, Mozambique, Zimbabwe and northwards into Botswana and Zambia. It is found in bushveld, riverine thicket, wooded grassland and rocky outcrops in grassland as well as scrub veld and is often found on termite mounds.

== History and significance ==
=== Origin of name ===
The generic name Pappea comes from the German physician and plant collector Karl Wilhelm Ludwig Pappe; the specific name capensis refers to southern Africa.

Other representatives of the family in South Africa are the false currants (Allophylus spp.), the sand olive (Dodonaea viscosa) and the bushveld red-balloon (Erythrophysa transvaalensis).

This previously known separate varieties (Pappea capensis var. capensis and P. capensis var. radlkoferii) are now widely accepted as regional variation with two forms; an arid form from drier areas and a more lush form from regions of higher rainfall.

Lobengula's Indaba tree is an old example of this tree, it is found at the state house in Bulawayo in Zimbabwe.

=== Ecology ===
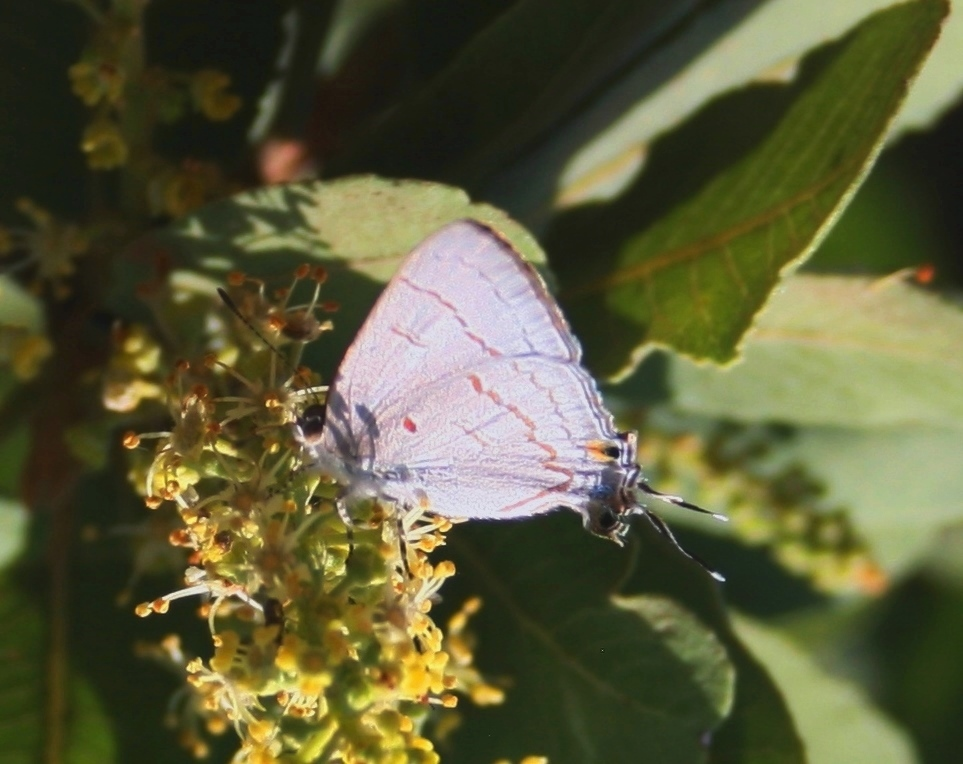
Imago of the purple-brown hairstreak (Hypolycaena philippus) attracted to the nectar

The fruit is eaten by various frugivorous birds and animals which in turn distribute the seeds in their droppings. The leaves are browsed by game such as elephant, giraffe, kudu, nyala, bushbuck, grey duiker and domestic stock animals.

The jacket plum is recorded as larval food of the following Lepidoptera of southern Africa:

- Common hairtail butterfly (Anthene definita)
- Brown playboy butterfly (Virachola antalus)
- Pearlspotted charaxes (Charaxes jahlusa)
- Gold-banded forester (Euphaedra neophron)
- Reticulate bagnest (Anaphe reticulata)

The sweetly scented flowers attract a wide variety of insects and birds. The seed is parasitised by a small, bright red bug (Leptocoris hexophtalma) which sucks the oil from the seed on the ground below the tree.

=== Uses and cultural aspects ===
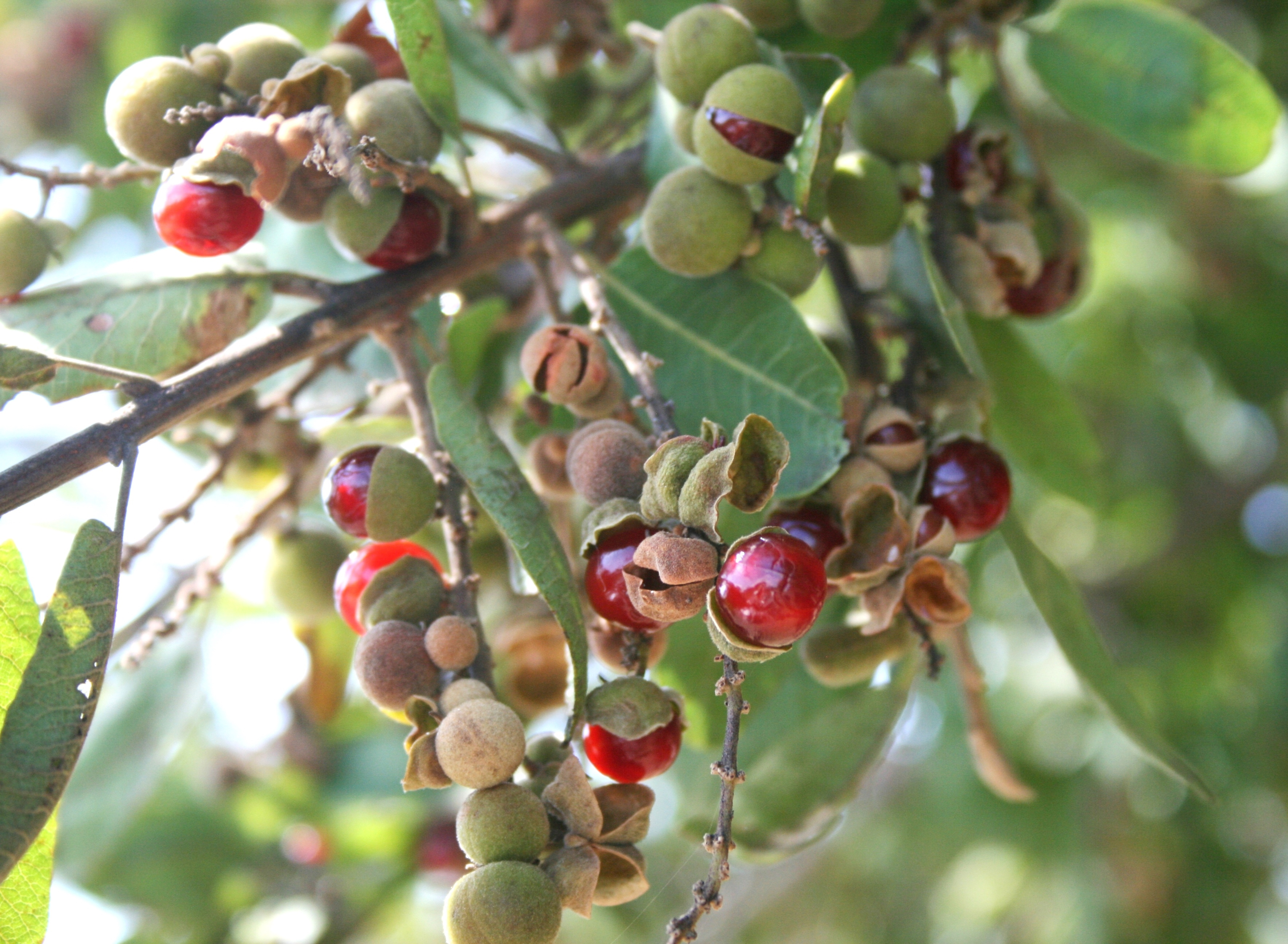
Ripe fruit in autumn

The delicious and very juicy fruit with a tart flavour is used to make preserve, jelly, vinegar and an alcoholic drink.

Leaves, bark and the oil extracted from the seed are used medicinally against baldness, ringworm, nosebleeds, chest complaints, eye infections, and venereal disease. Bark is also used in protective charms that are sprinkled on the ground. Some research has reported that the leaves are very effective in killing snails. Infusions of the bark are also used by Kenyan Maasai warriors to gain courage as well as an aphrodisiac and a blood-strengthening tonic. The root is used orally or as an enema and as a purgative for cattle.

The wood is hard, light brown with a reddish tint, tough and heavy with a twisted grain. There is little difference between the heartwood and the sapwood. The stems seldom attain significant girth and therefore do not yield much usable wood. This tree is used as an important source of herbal medicine.
