= Anaphe stellata =

Scientific classification
- Kingdom: Animalia
- Phylum: Arthropoda
- Clade: Pancrustacea
- Class: Insecta
- Order: Lepidoptera
- Superfamily: Noctuoidea
- Family: Notodontidae
- Genus: Anaphe
- Species: A. stellata

Binomial name
- Anaphe stellata (Guérin-Meneville, 1844)

Synonyms
- Agarista stellata Guérin-Méneville, [1844]; Anaphela luctifera Walker, 1855

Species of moth

Anaphe stellata is a species of moth in the family Notodontidae. It was described by Félix Édouard Guérin-Méneville in 1844. It is found in Ethiopia, Madagascar and Senegal.
