= Anaphe vuilleti =

Scientific classification
- Domain: Eukaryota
- Kingdom: Animalia
- Phylum: Arthropoda
- Class: Insecta
- Order: Lepidoptera
- Superfamily: Noctuoidea
- Family: Notodontidae
- Genus: Anaphe
- Species: A. vuilleti

Binomial name
- Anaphe vuilleti (de Joannis, 1907)

Synonyms
- Hypsoides vuilleti de Joannis, 1907

Species of moth

Anaphe vuilleti is a moth of the family Notodontidae. It was described by Joseph de Joannis in 1907. It is found in the Democratic Republic of the Congo and Senegal.
