= Anaphe johnstonei =

Scientific classification
- Kingdom: Animalia
- Phylum: Arthropoda
- Class: Insecta
- Order: Lepidoptera
- Superfamily: Noctuoidea
- Family: Notodontidae
- Genus: Anaphe
- Species: A. johnstonei

Binomial name
- Anaphe johnstonei Tams, 1932

Species of moth

Anaphe johnstonei is a moth of the family Notodontidae. It was first described by Willie Horace Thomas Tams in 1932. It is found in Malawi.
