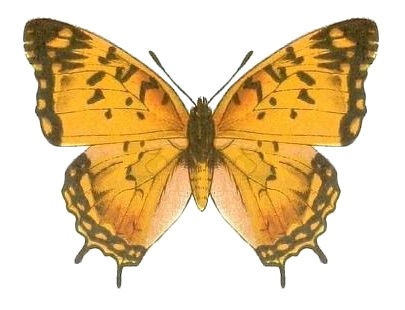
- From Adalbert Seitz's Fauna Africana

Scientific classification
- Kingdom: Animalia
- Phylum: Arthropoda
- Clade: Pancrustacea
- Class: Insecta
- Order: Lepidoptera
- Family: Nymphalidae
- Genus: Charaxes
- Species: C. jahlusa

Binomial name
- Charaxes jahlusa (Trimen, 1862)

Synonyms
- Nymphalis jahlusa Trimen, 1862; Charaxes argynnides Westwood, 1864; Charaxes jahlusa kenyensis f. pallene van Someren, 1974; Charaxes jahlusa kigoma van Someren, 1974

= Charaxes jahlusa =

Pearl-spotted emperor

Species of butterfly

Charaxes jahlusa, the pearl-spotted emperor or pearl spotted charaxes, is a butterfly of the family Nymphalidae found in southern Africa.

== Description in Seitz ==
Jahlusa Group. Differs from all the other charaxes groups in the light, green or yellowish, veins. Both wings above with narrow, light- spotted, black marginal band; forewing in addition with black spots in the cell and the basal part of cellules 1b- 8; these spots are rounded and on the under surface margined with white. Hindwing above almost unmarked, beneath with large silver spots at the anal angle obtusely produced and with two small tails, of which the one at vein 2 is somewhat longer. Colourand markings decidedly Argynnis-like. Distal margin of the forewing in the male deeply, in the female more weakly excised. Ch. jahlusa Trim. Wings above light orange-yellow with black marginal band, 3 (male) or 4 (female) mm. in breadth, which on the forewing only encloses large marginal spots, on the hindwing both submarginal spots and also marginal streaks. Forewing above in addition with a dot and a curved transverse streak in the cell, a transverse streak at the end of the cell, two discal dots each in 1 a and 2, a spot each in 3-7 and a longitudinal streak in 4-7 just inside the marginal band black. Hindwing above without markings or with small black transverse streaks in 2 and 4-7. Forewing beneath in the cell and in cellules 1a -2 light reddish, at the costal margin and in the apical area olive-grey with a large silver-white spot behind the middle of the costal margin; the black spots almost as above. Hindwing beneath at the base and at the distal margin dark olive-coloured, in the middle with continuous silver-white transverse band, in the basal part of cellule 7 with a large silver spot, the cell and cellule 1c each with two smaller ones; two black dots in cellule la and 3 in 8; the interneural folds of cellules lb-6 inside the marginal band with black longitudinal streaks. Abdomen beneath with a black longitudinal line at each side; these streaks anteriorly thickened and often joined together. Cape to Transvaal. - argynnides Westw. is the more northern form, occurring at the Zambesi, in Nyassaland and German East Africa. The black lines on the underside of the abdomen are broken up into spots, the transverse streak in the cell of the forewing is also divided into spots and the silver-white markings on the under surface are smaller.

== Biology ==
Flight period is from October to March, some species are year-round.

Larvae feed on Pappea capensis, Dalbergia melanoxylon, and Haplocoelum foliosum.

The habitat is Savanna extending into Karoo and Albany thicket. In Tanzania the habitat is forest, on forest margins and in dry evergreen forest See Afrotropical realm for broad description of habitats. Notes on the biology of jahlusa are provided by Kielland (1990), Larsen (1991) and Pringle et (1994)

== Taxonomy ==
Charaxes jahlusa is the sole member of the Charaxes jahlusa species group

== Subspecies ==
Listed alphabetically.

- C. j. argynnides Westwood, 1864 — southern Angola, Democratic Republic of the Congo, southern Tanzania, Malawi, Zambia, Mozambique, northern and eastern Zimbabwe, northern Botswana, South Africa: KwaZulu-Natal, Eswatini
- C. j. ganalensis Carpenter, 1937 — southern Sudan, south-western Ethiopia, northern Uganda, western Kenya
- C. j. jahlusa (Trimen, 1862) — South Africa: Eastern Cape Province, Western Cape Province
- C. j. kenyensis Joicey & Talbot, 1925 — eastern and north-eastern Kenya, north-eastern Tanzania
- C. j. kigomaensis van Someren, 1975— Tanzania: north-west to the eastern shores of Lake Tanganyika
- C. j. mafiae Turlin & Lequeux, 1992 - Tanzania: Mafia Island
- C. j. rex Henning, 1978. — southern Zimbabwe, south-eastern Botswana, South Africa: Limpopo, Mpumalanga, North West and Gauteng provinces
- C. j. rwandensis Plantrou, 1976. — western Rwanda, north-western Tanzania
