= Diapalpus =

Scientific classification
- Kingdom: Animalia
- Phylum: Arthropoda
- Clade: Pancrustacea
- Class: Insecta
- Order: Lepidoptera
- Family: Lasiocampidae
- Subfamily: Lasiocampinae
- Tribe: Selenepherini
- Genus: Diapalpus; Strand, 1913

Genus of moths

Diapalpus is a genus of moths in the family Lasiocampidae. The genus was erected by Strand in 1913.

== Species ==
- Diapalpus axiologa Hering, 1932
- Diapalpus congregarius Strand, 1913
- Diapalpus griseus Hering, 1941
