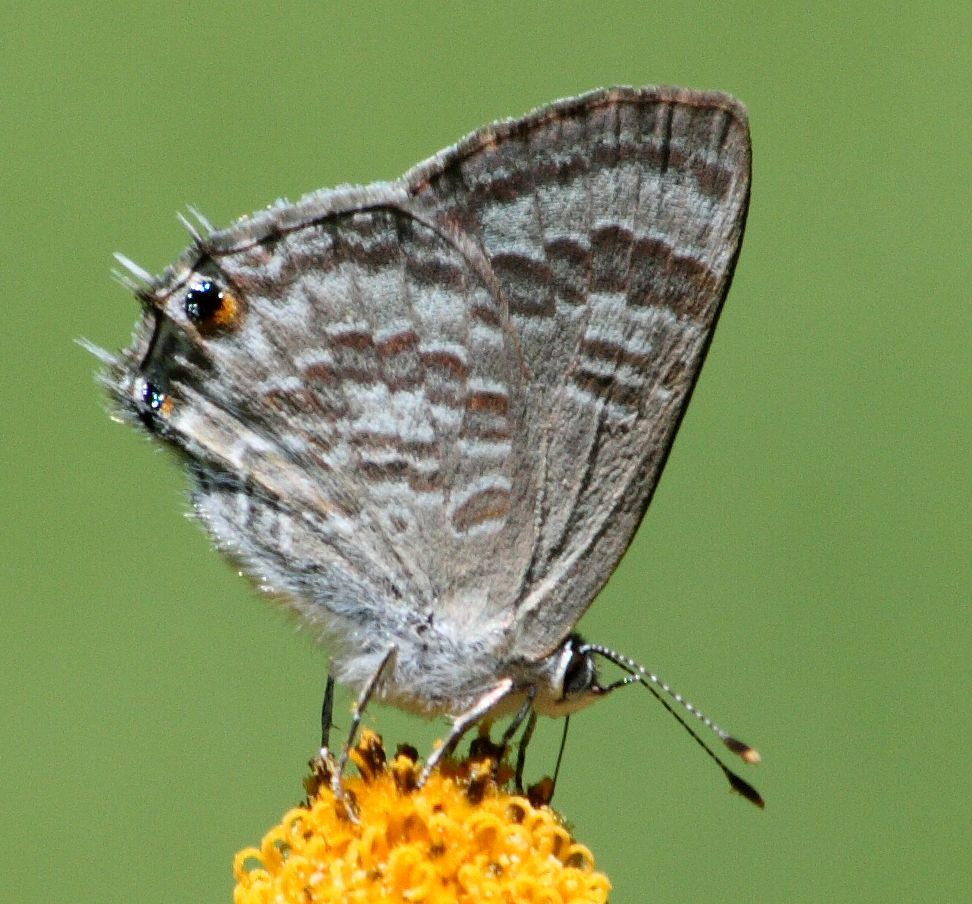
- Anthene definita definita

Scientific classification
- Domain: Eukaryota
- Kingdom: Animalia
- Phylum: Arthropoda
- Class: Insecta
- Order: Lepidoptera
- Family: Lycaenidae
- Genus: Anthene
- Species: A. definita

Binomial name
- Anthene definita (Butler, 1899)

Synonyms
- Lycaenesthes definita Butler, 1899; Lycaenesthes nigrocaudata Pagenstecher, 1902; Lycaenesthes ligures var. liguroides Strand, 1911; Lycaenesthes fasciata Ungemach, 1932

= Anthene definita =

Species of butterfly

Anthene definita, the common ciliate blue or common hairtail, is a butterfly of the family Lycaenidae. It is found in southern Africa.

The wingspan is 21–27 mm for males and 24–29 mm for females. Adults are on wing year-round in warmer areas, with a peak in summer.

The larvae feed on Allophylus africanus, Pappea capensis, Mangifera indica, Myrica aethiopica, Myrica sericea, Acacia karroo, Acacia cyanophylla, Acacia saligna, Paraserianthus lophanta, Schotia, Bersama and Kalanchoe species. The larvae are associated with ants of the genus Iridomyrmyx.

== Subspecies ==
- Anthene definita definita (Guinea (Nimbas), Ivory Coast, Ghana, Nigeria, Cameroon, Democratic Republic of the Congo: Ituri, North Kivu, Lualaba and Shaba, Uganda, central and western Kenya, to northern Zambia, Mozambique, Zimbabwe, Eswatini, South Africa: Limpopo Province, Mpumalanga, North West Province, Gauteng, KwaZulu-Natal, Eastern Cape Province and Western Cape Province)
- Anthene definita nigrocaudata (Pagenstecher, 1902) (Ethiopia)
