= Anaphe aurea =

Scientific classification
- Kingdom: Animalia
- Phylum: Arthropoda
- Class: Insecta
- Order: Lepidoptera
- Superfamily: Noctuoidea
- Family: Notodontidae
- Genus: Anaphe
- Species: A. aurea

Binomial name
- Anaphe aurea Butler, 1892

Synonyms
- Coenostegia unicolor Oberthür, 1922

Species of moth

Anaphe aurea is a moth of the family Notodontidae. It was described by Arthur Gardiner Butler in 1892. It is found on Madagascar.
