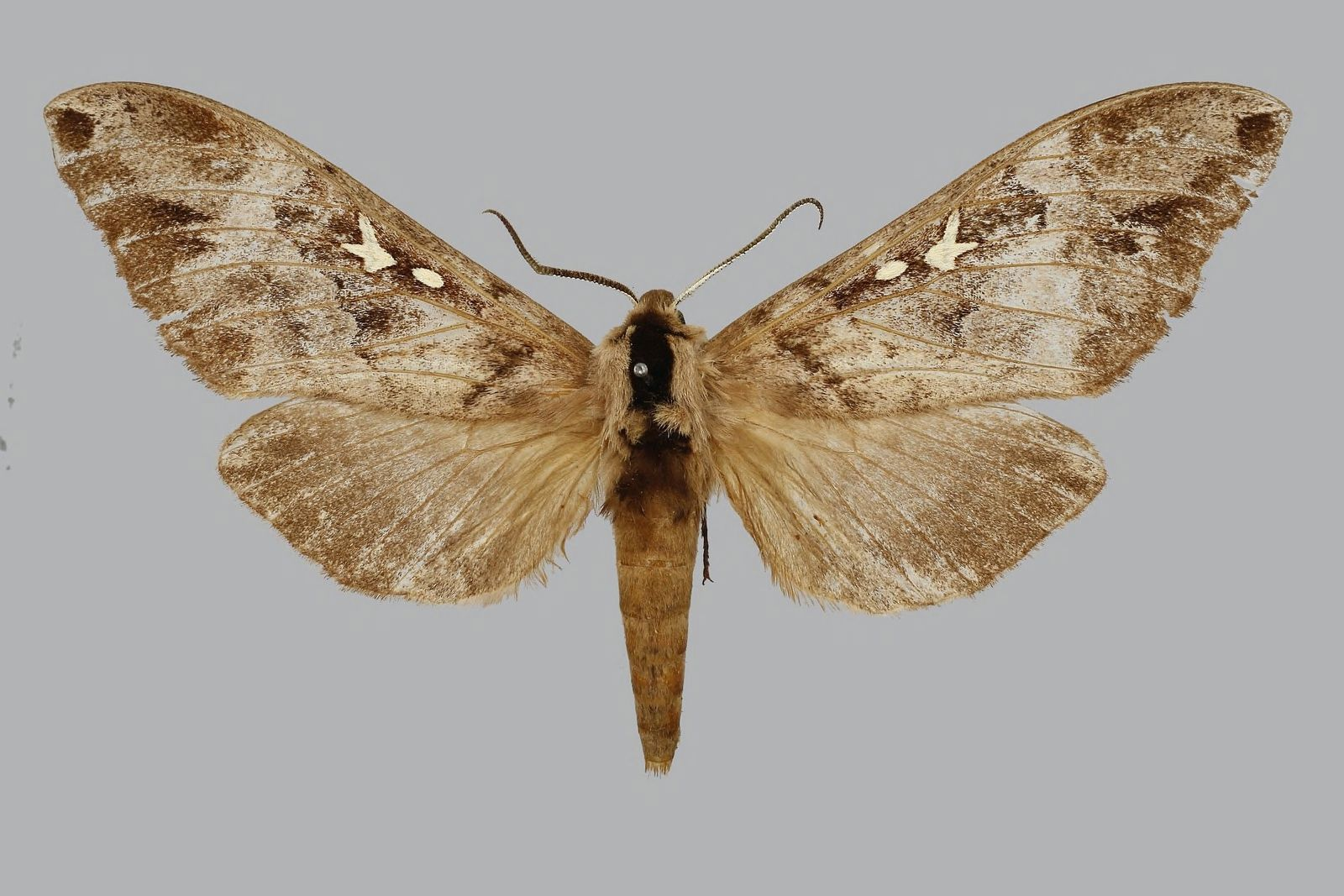

Scientific classification
- Kingdom: Animalia
- Phylum: Arthropoda
- Class: Insecta
- Order: Lepidoptera
- Family: Sphingidae
- Genus: Lophostethus
- Species: L. negus

Binomial name
- Lophostethus negus Jordan, 1926

= Lophostethus negus =

Species of moth

Lophostethus negus is a moth of the family Sphingidae. It is known from highland forests in Ethiopia.
