= Anaphe dempwolffi =

Scientific classification
- Kingdom: Animalia
- Phylum: Arthropoda
- Class: Insecta
- Order: Lepidoptera
- Superfamily: Noctuoidea
- Family: Notodontidae
- Genus: Anaphe
- Species: A. dempwolffi

Binomial name
- Anaphe dempwolffi Strand, 1909

Species of moth

Anaphe dempwolffi is a moth of the family Notodontidae. It was described by Strand in 1909. It is found in Tanzania.
