= Anaphe panda =

- Anaphe panda caterpillars

Scientific classification
- Kingdom: Animalia
- Phylum: Arthropoda
- Clade: Pancrustacea
- Class: Insecta
- Order: Lepidoptera
- Superfamily: Noctuoidea
- Family: Notodontidae
- Genus: Anaphe
- Species: A. panda

Binomial name
- Anaphe panda (Boisduval, 1847)

Synonyms
- Bombyx panda Boisduval, 1847; Anaphe infracta Walsingham, 1885; Anaphe panda var. leplaei Mayné, 1914

Species of moth

Anaphe panda is a moth of the family Notodontidae. It was described by Jean Baptiste Boisduval in 1847. It is found in Cameroon, the Democratic Republic of the Congo, Equatorial Guinea, Kenya, Malawi, South Africa, Tanzania and the Gambia.

The larvae have been recorded feeding on Bridelia micrantha.

Larvae are eaten in Central Africa and are especially liked because of their high fat content.
