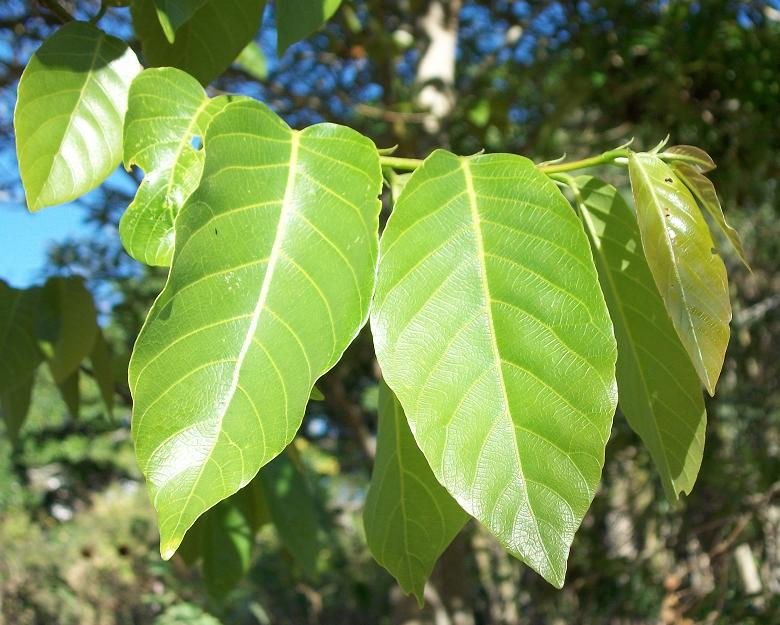
- Fresh leaves of Bridelia micrantha from Amanzimtoti, South Africa

Conservation status
- Least Concern (IUCN 3.1)

Scientific classification
- Kingdom: Plantae
- Clade: Embryophytes
- Clade: Tracheophytes
- Clade: Angiosperms
- Clade: Eudicots
- Clade: Rosids
- Order: Malpighiales
- Family: Phyllanthaceae
- Genus: Bridelia
- Species: B. micrantha

Binomial name
- Bridelia micrantha (Hochst.) Baill.

Synonyms
- Candelabria micrantha Hochst. (basionym); Bridelia micrantha var. genuina Müll.Arg. (nom. inval.)

= Bridelia micrantha =

Mitzeerie

Species of tree from tropical and southern Africa

Bridelia micrantha, the mitzeeri or the coastal golden-leaf, is a tree in the family Phyllanthaceae and is native to tropical and southern Africa as well as to the island of Réunion in the Indian Ocean.

== Description ==
A medium to tall tree (up to 20 m), with a dense widely spreading crown. The leaves are large, alternate and simple. The tree may be deciduous or evergreen.

== Habitat ==
They are found growing in coastal forests (such as KwaZulu-Natal Coastal Lowland Forest), riverine forest, swamp forest, woodland and along forest margins.

== Native distribution ==
Bridelia micrantha is native to primarily tropical, northeast, western, west-central, and southern Africa (in Angola; Benin; Burkina Faso; Cameroon; Central African Republic; Côte d'Ivoire; Equatorial Guinea; the Democratic Republic of the Congo; Ethiopia; Gabon; Gambia; Ghana; Guinea; Kenya; Liberia; Malawi; Mali; Mozambique; Nigeria; Rwanda; São Tomé and Príncipe; Senegal; Sierra Leone; South Africa (in Eastern Cape, KwaZulu-Natal, Limpopo, Mpumalanga; and Eswatini); Sudan; Tanzania (inclusive of the Zanzibar Archipelago); Togo; Uganda; Zambia; and Zimbabwe); and the western Indian Ocean island of Réunion.

== Ecological significance ==
Bridelia micrantha is a larval food plant for butterflies such as: Abantis paradisea, Charaxes castor flavifasciatus and Parosmodes morantii morantii, and also the silkmoth Anaphe panda.

== Ethnobotanical medicinal use ==
Bridelia micrantha has been used locally in folk medicine, variously as an anti-abortifacient, an antidote, a laxative or purgative; and to treat diverse conditions of the central nervous system (headache), eye (infections, conjunctivitis), the gastrointestinal system (abdominal pain, constipation, gastritis), respiratory system (common cold), and the skin (scabies); and used hygienically as a mouthwash.
