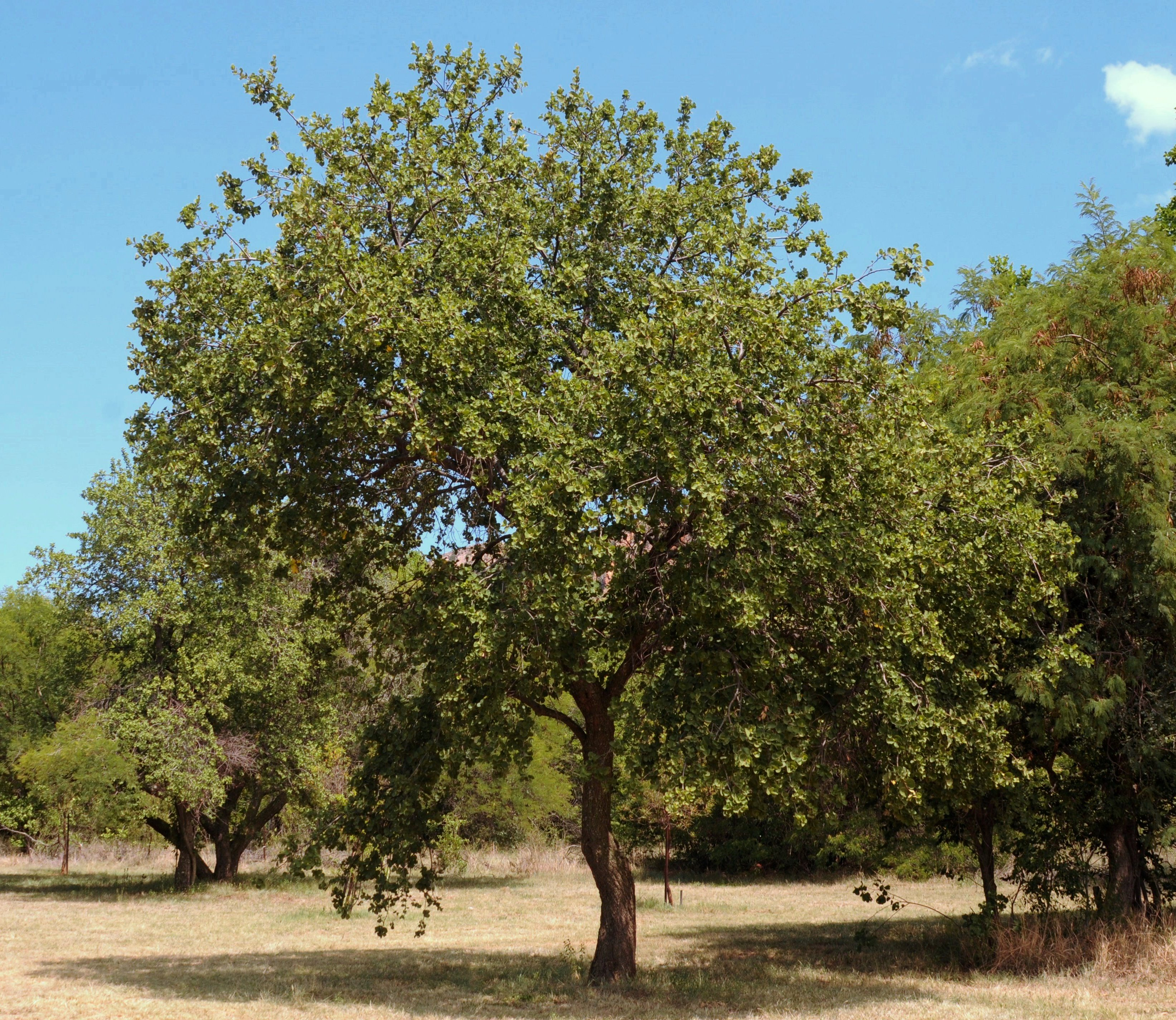

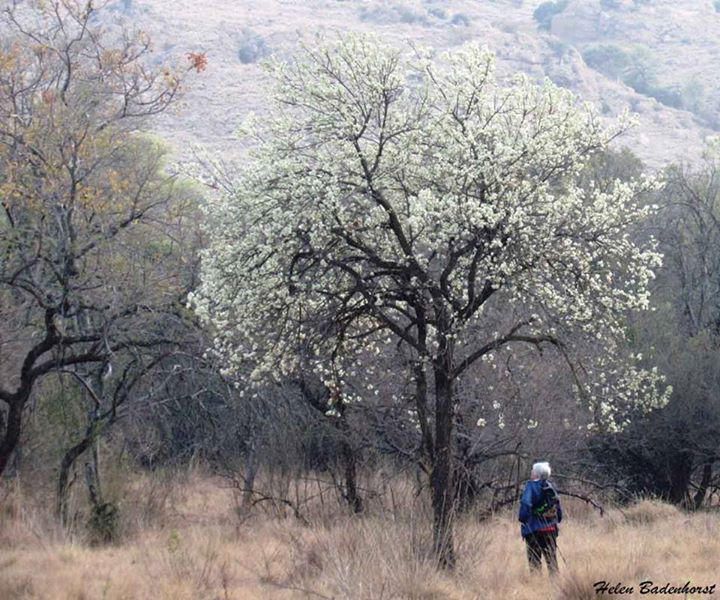
- In summer and spring

Conservation status
- Least Concern (IUCN 3.1)

Scientific classification
- Kingdom: Plantae
- Clade: Embryophytes
- Clade: Tracheophytes
- Clade: Spermatophytes
- Clade: Angiosperms
- Clade: Eudicots
- Clade: Rosids
- Order: Malvales
- Family: Malvaceae
- Genus: Dombeya
- Species: D. rotundifolia

Binomial name
- Dombeya rotundifolia (Hochst.) Planch.
- ● occurrence records

Synonyms
- Assonia cuanzensis Hiern; Assonia densiflora (Planch. ex Harv.) Kuntze; Assonia myriantha (K.Schum.) Kuntze; Assonia rotundifolia (Hochst.) Kuntze; Dombeya cerasiflora Exell; Dombeya condensiflora De Wild.; Dombeya cuanzensis (Hiern) Welw. ex K.Schum.; Dombeya damarana K.Schum.; Dombeya delevoyi De Wild.; Dombeya densiflora Planch. ex Harv.; Dombeya dinteri Schinz; Dombeya gossweileri Exell; Dombeya melanostigma K.Schum. & Engl.; Dombeya myriantha K.Schum.; Dombeya ringoetii De Wild.; Dombeya rotundifolia var. velutina I.Verd.; Dombeya subdichotoma De Wild.; Xeropetalum rotundifolium Hochst.

= Dombeya rotundifolia =

South African wild pear

Species of tree

Dombeya rotundifolia, the dikbas or "South African wild pear" (it is not related to pear trees), is a species of small deciduous tree with dark grey to blackish deeply fissured bark, found in Southern Africa and northwards to central and eastern tropical Africa. Formerly placed in the Sterculiaceae, that artificial group has now been abandoned by most authors and the plants are part of an enlarged Malvaceae.

The species was first described as Xeropetalum rotundifolium by Christian Ferdinand Friedrich Hochstetter in 1844. In 1851 Jules Émile Planchon placed the species in genus Dombeya as D. rotundifolia.

== Description ==
Trees are normally 5–6 m tall with a single well-defined trunk, growing on deep soils, river banks and rocky places. Leaves and flower buds are densely covered in stellate hairs. One of the first species to flower in spring, often with Erythrina lysistemon. Flowers are abundant and sweet-scented, usually white but occasionally pale pink. Flowers (15–20 mm diameter) inconspicuous round fruits form at the centre of the brown, dead, persistent petals. Wood is bluish-grey, dense, hard and extremely tough, and was sought after during the era of building wagons and carriages.

Most of the cultivated dombeyas are shrubs with attractive pink or white flowers closely related to D. rotundifolia, such as Dombeya burgessiae or Dombeya autumnalis; the latter was described when its habit of flowering during autumn became apparent.

== Cultivation and uses ==
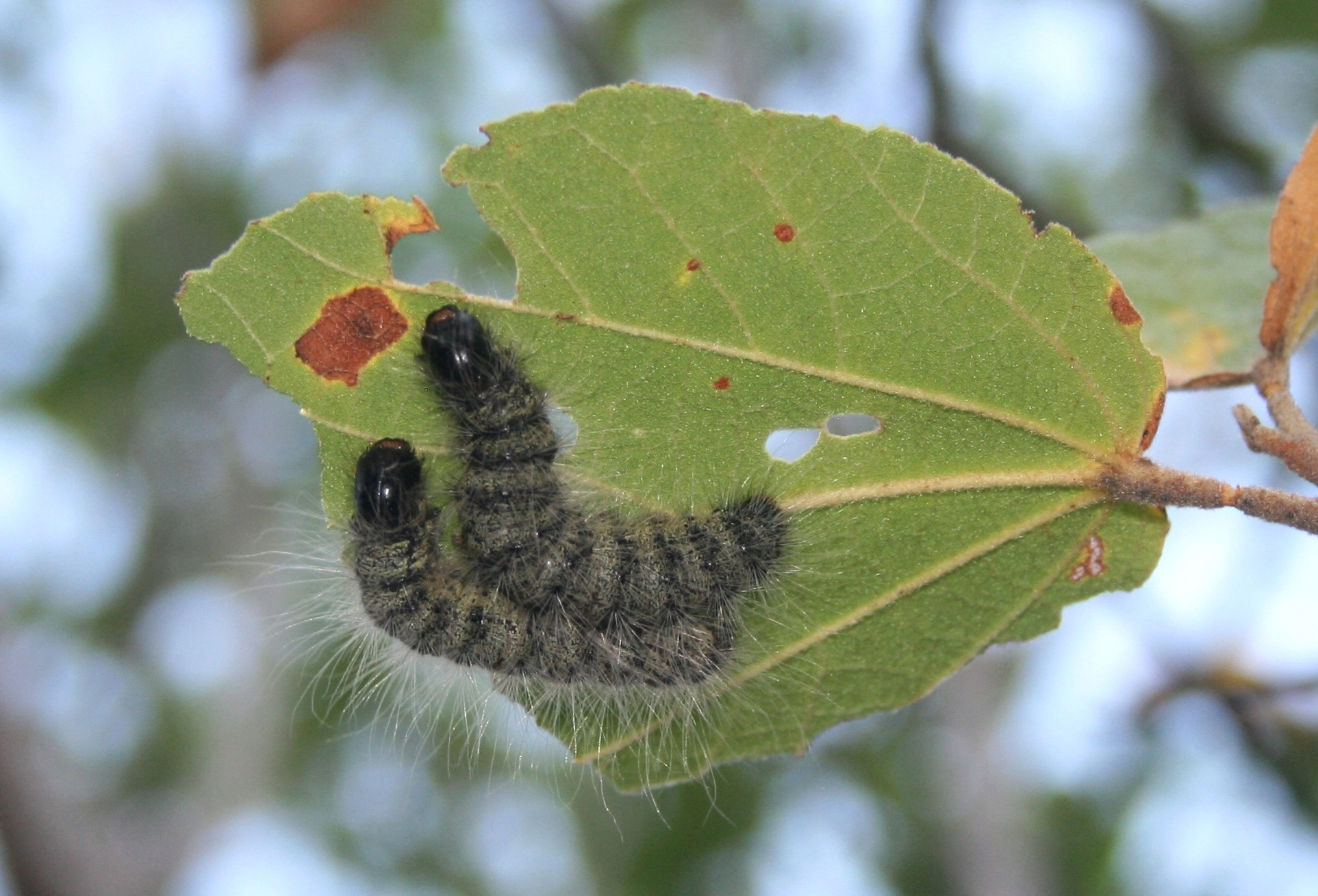
Caterpillars of the reticulate bagnest feeding on the foliage

It is drought and frost tolerant; it is popular with beekeepers due to its high nectar production that attracts a multitude of bees and butterflies. Its flowers in showy profuse displays make it a highly valued ornamental tree. It produces a good timber with a greyish-blue heartwood and suitable for woodworking. Freshly-cut timber has a strong aroma of fishmeal.

This species is host to the scale insect Lecanodiaspis tarsalis Newstead, 1917. Caterpillars of Anaphe reticulata feed on the foliage during late summer and early winter, and may denude the trees.

== Gallery ==
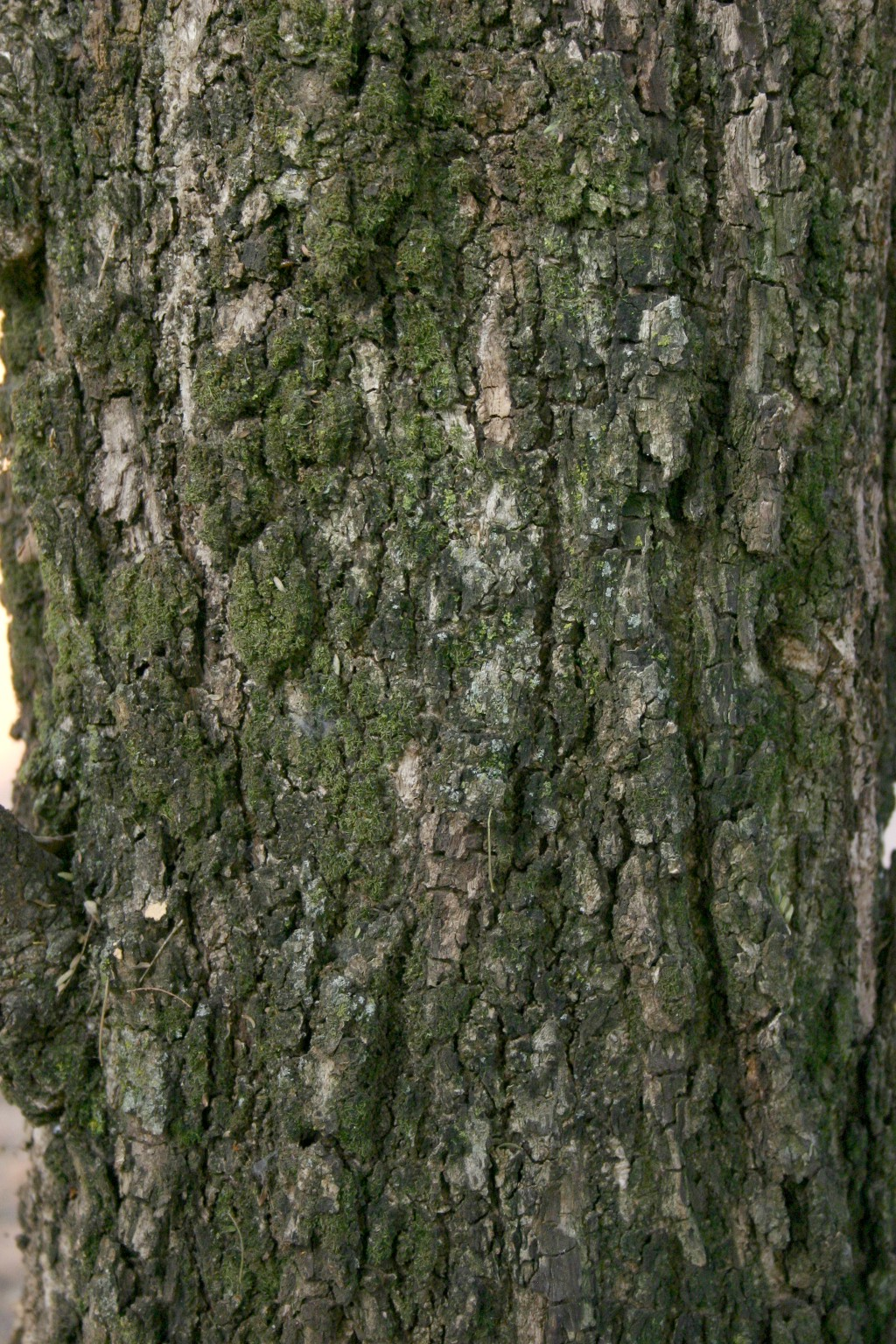

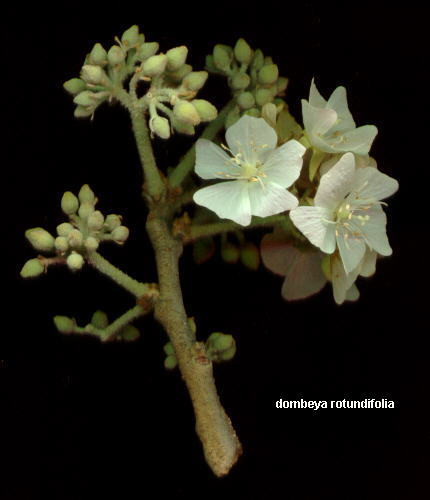

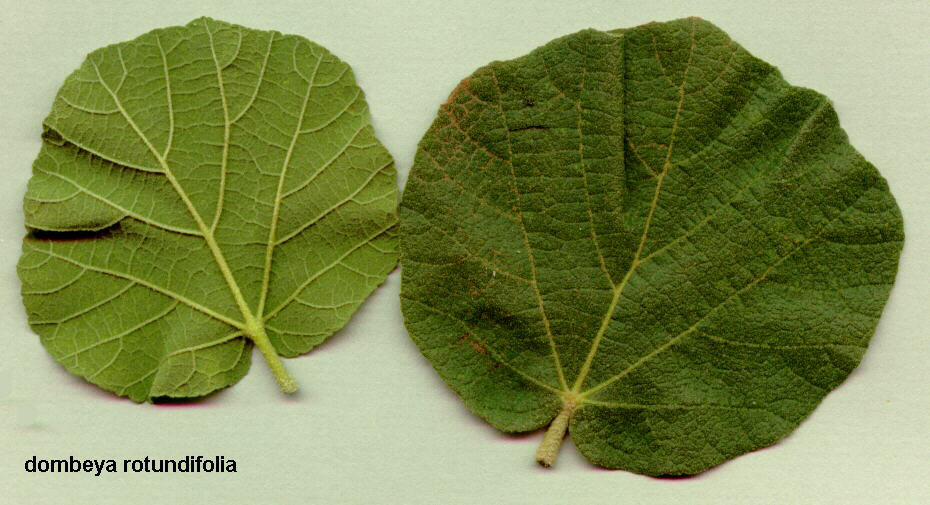

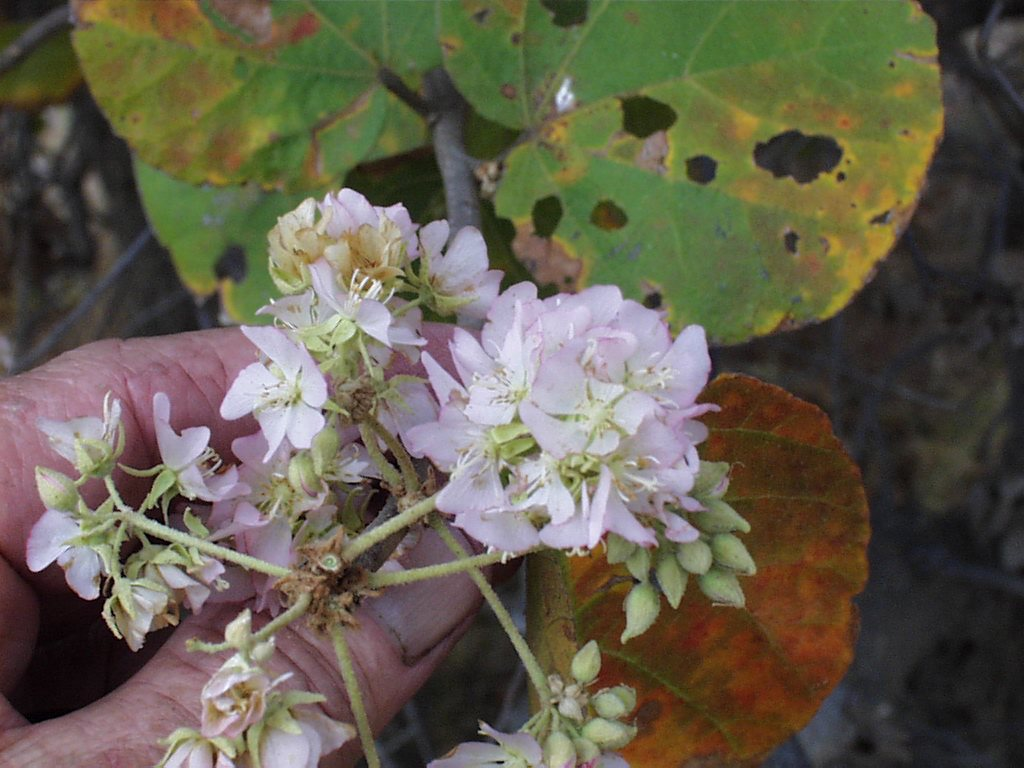

== See also ==
- List of Southern African indigenous trees
