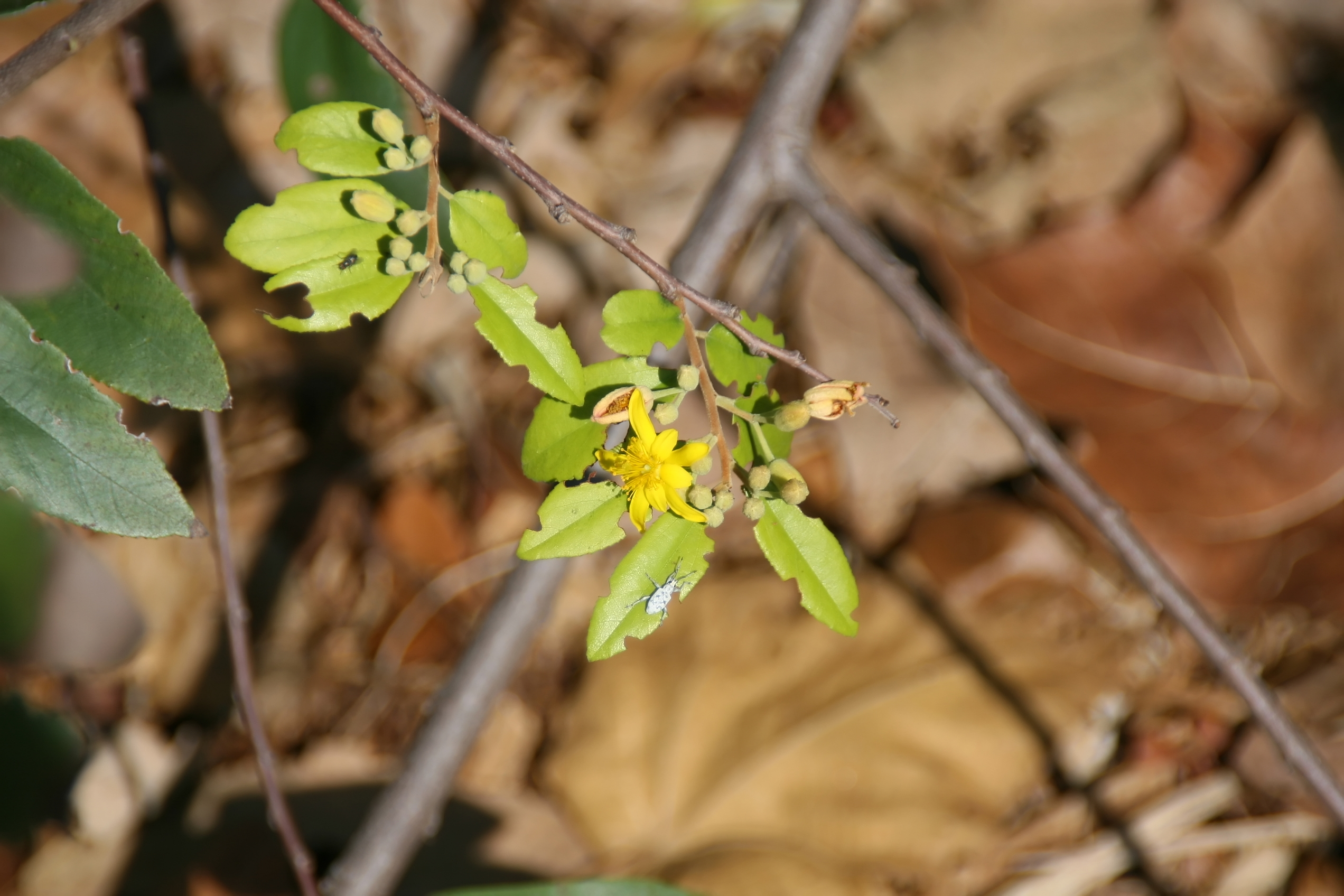
- Flowers
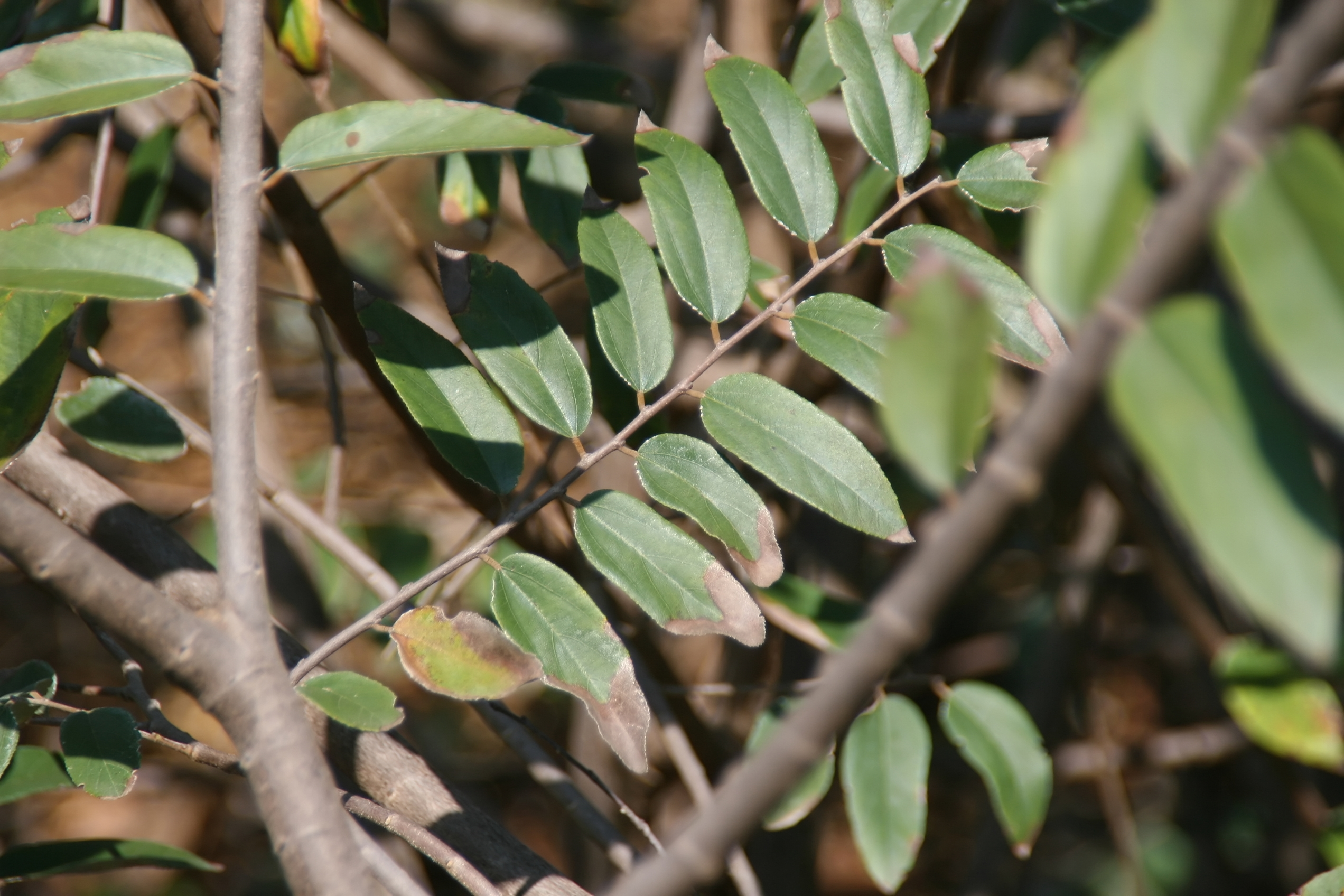
- Leaves

Scientific classification
- Kingdom: Plantae
- Clade: Tracheophytes
- Clade: Angiosperms
- Clade: Eudicots
- Clade: Rosids
- Order: Malvales
- Family: Malvaceae
- Genus: Grewia
- Species: G. bicolor

Binomial name
- Grewia bicolor Juss.

Synonyms
- List: Grewia cinerea A.Rich.; Grewia cubensis Turcz.; Grewia dinteri Schinz; Grewia discolor Fresen.; Grewia disticha Dinter & Burret; Grewia grisea N.E.Br.; Grewia heterophylla A.Rich.; Grewia kwebensis N.E.Br.; Grewia madandensis J.R.Drumm. ex Baker f.; Grewia miniata Mast. ex Hiern; Grewia mossambicensis Burret; Grewia pallida Hochst. ex A.Rich.; Grewia salvifolia B.Heyne ex Roth

= Grewia bicolor =

Species of flowering plant

Grewia bicolor, called bastard brandy bush, false brandy bush, two-coloured grewia, white-leaved grewia, white-leaved raisin, white raisin and donkey berry (a name it shares with Grewia flavescens), is a species of flowering plant in the family Malvaceae, native to sub-Saharan Africa, Yemen, Oman, and the Indian subcontinent. In Africa Grewia bicolor is one of the most important forages during the dry season, when all herbivores, wild and domestic, find it palatable. It is particularly enjoyed by giant eland (Taurotragus derbianus) and domestic goats (Capra aegagrus hircus). Caterpillars of Anaphe reticulata have been found to feed on the foliage.
