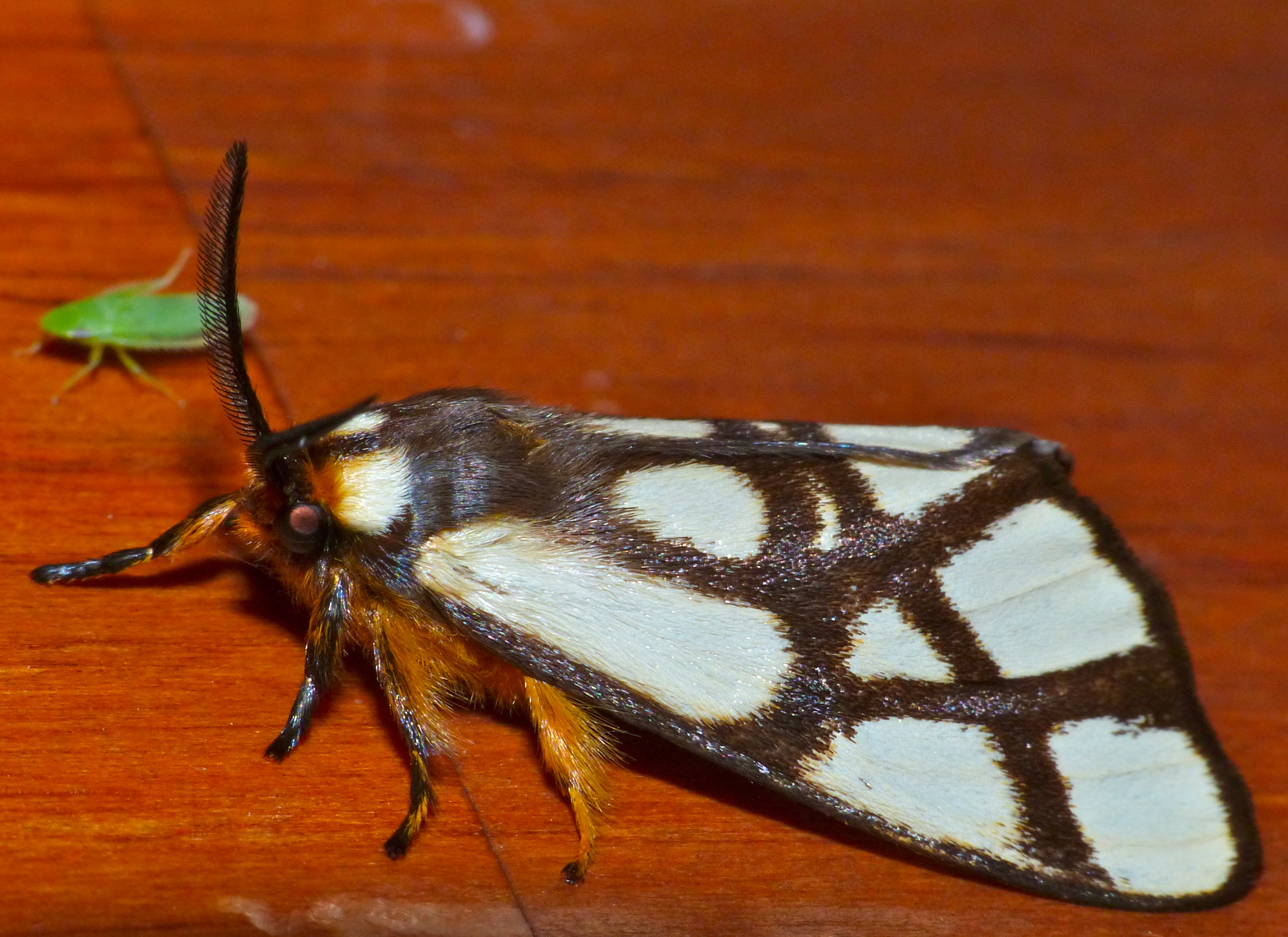

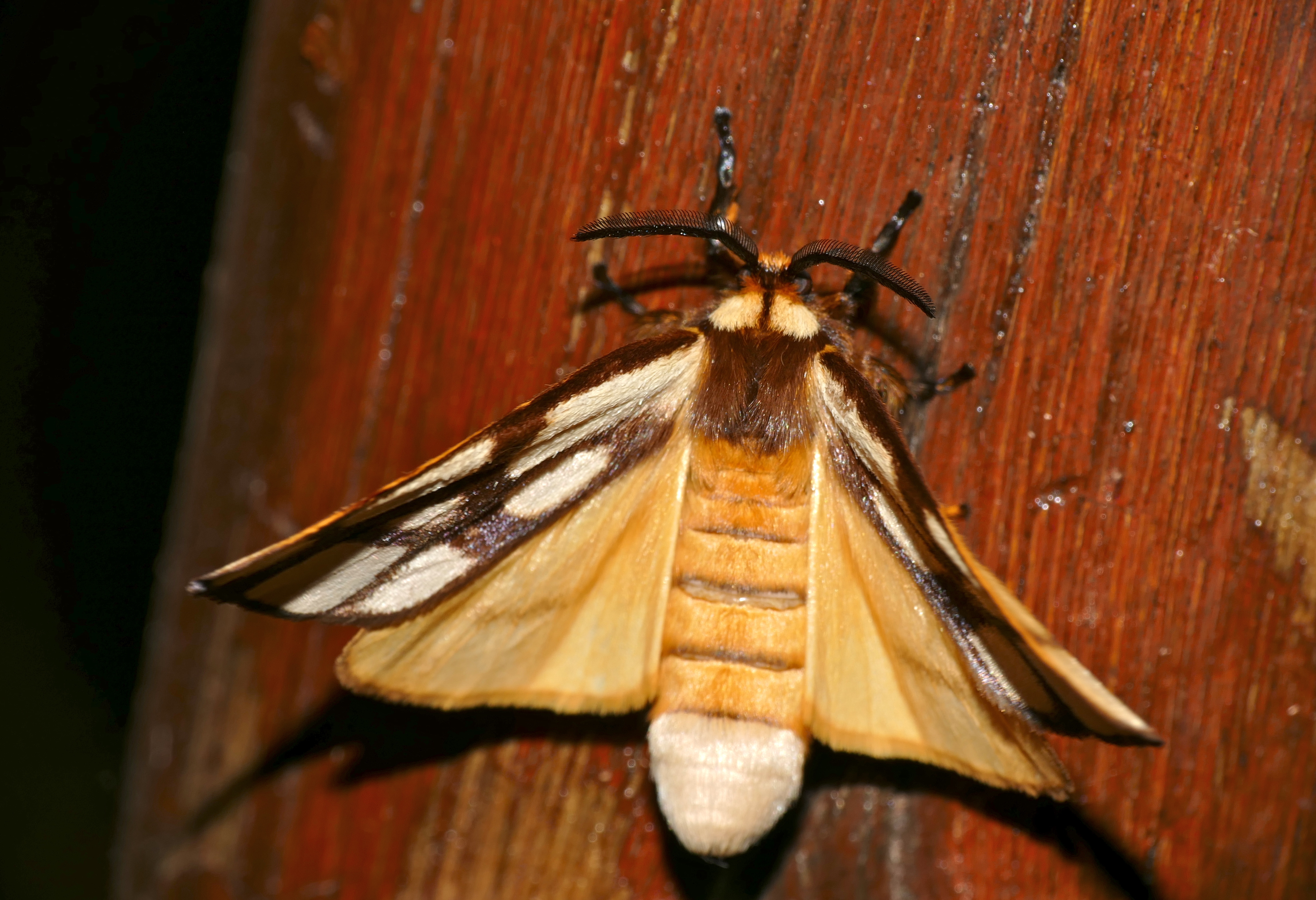
- Anaphe reticulata

Scientific classification
- Domain: Eukaryota
- Kingdom: Animalia
- Phylum: Arthropoda
- Class: Insecta
- Order: Lepidoptera
- Superfamily: Noctuoidea
- Family: Notodontidae
- Genus: Anaphe; Walker, 1855

Synonyms
- Arnophila Mabille, 1880; Anaphela Walker, 1855; Arapha Pagenstecher, 1909; Arctiomorpha Herrich-Schäffer, 1855; Henosis Wallengren, 1865; Zastonia Herrich-Schäffer, 1858

= Anaphe (moth) =

Genus of moths

Anaphe is a genus of moths in the family Notodontidae erected by Francis Walker in 1855.

== Species ==
- Anaphe aurea Butler, 1892
- Anaphe dempwolffi Strand, 1909
- Anaphe etiennei Schouteden, 1912
- Anaphe johnstonei Tams, 1932
- Anaphe panda (Boisduval, 1847)
- Anaphe reticulata Walker, 1855
- Anaphe stellata Guérin-Méneville, 1844
- Anaphe venata Butler, 1878
- Anaphe vuilleti (de Joannis, 1907)
