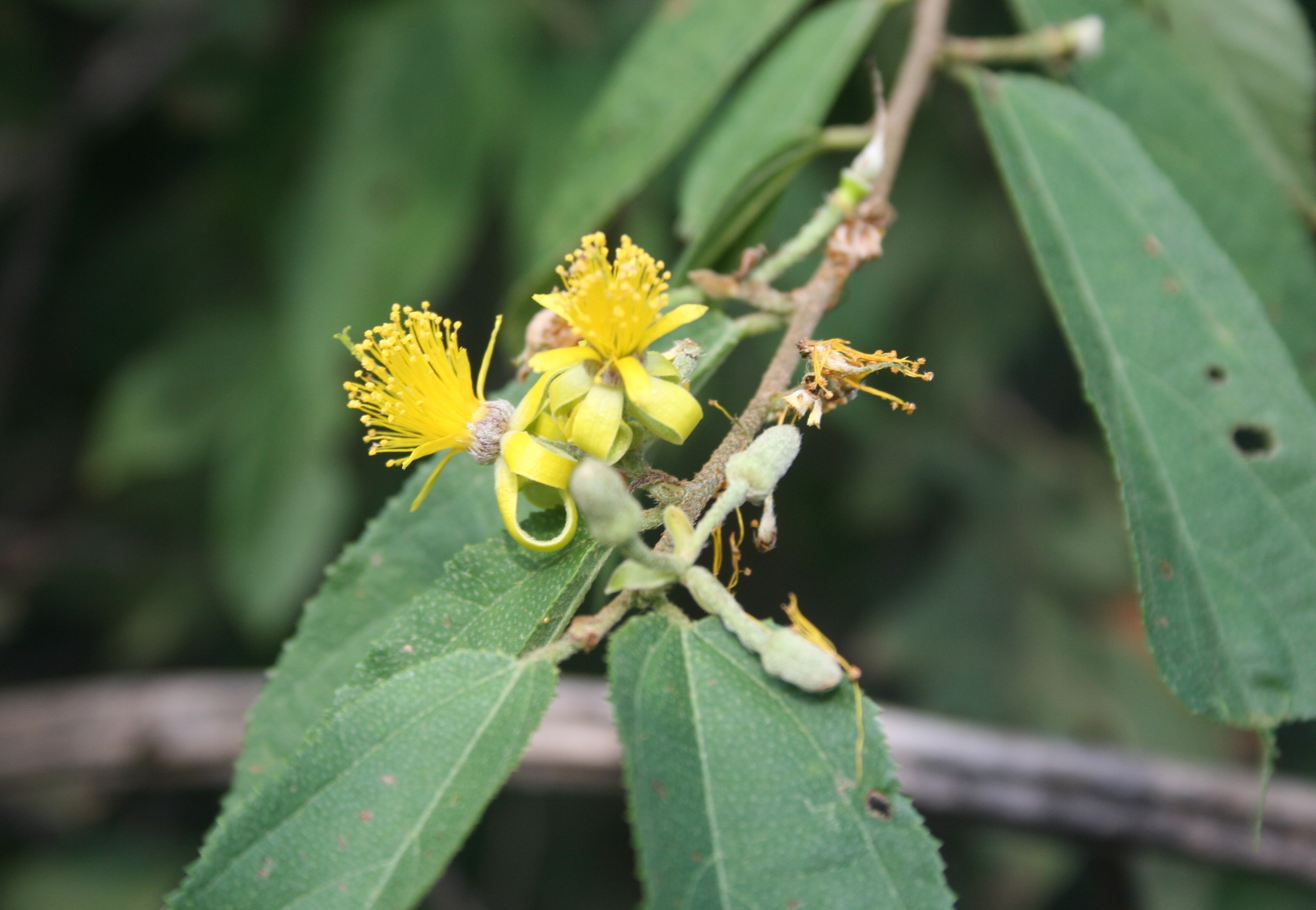
- Flowering in autumn, South Africa
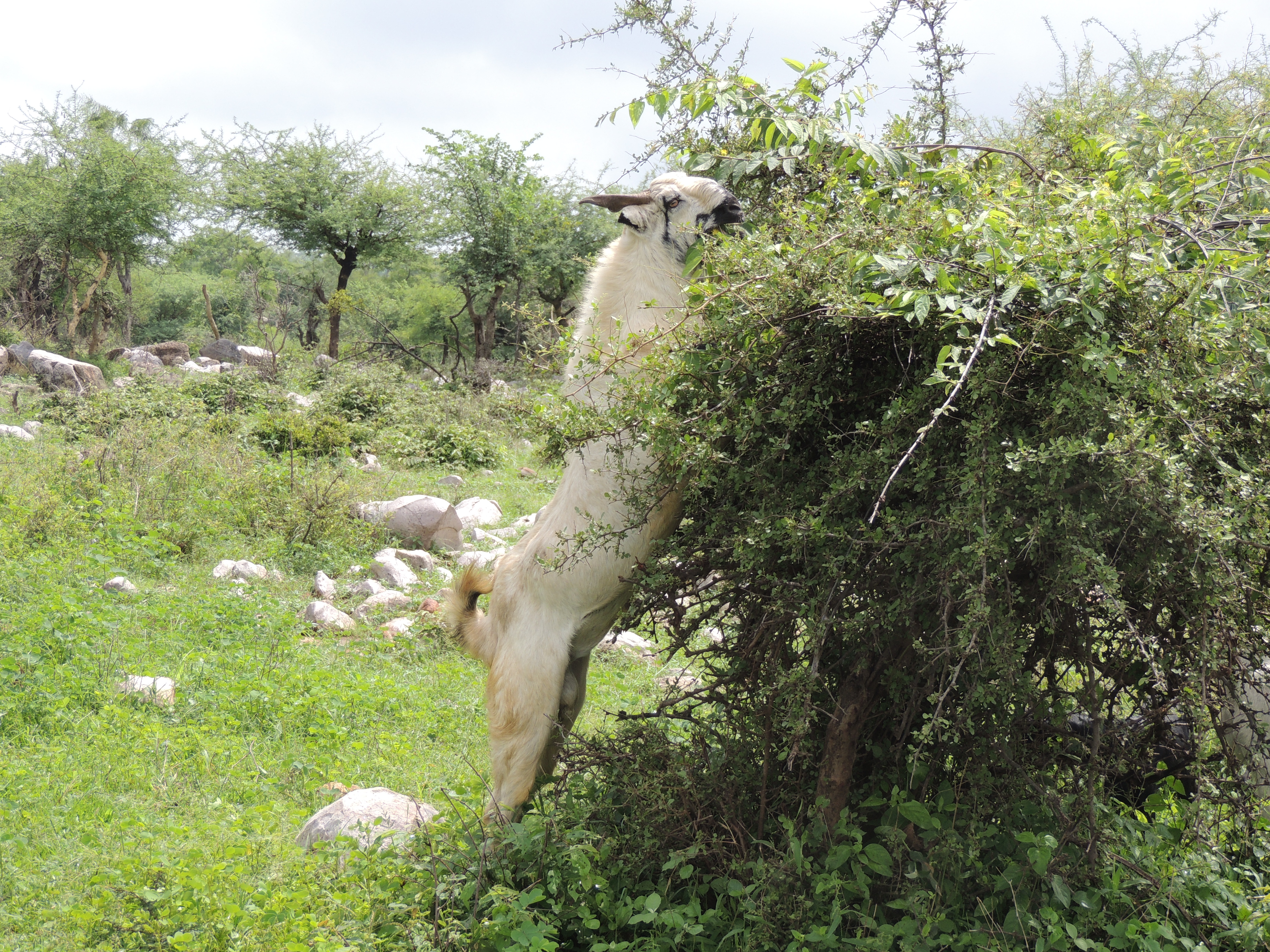
- A he-goat browsing on G. flavescens

Conservation status
- Least Concern (IUCN 3.1)

Scientific classification
- Kingdom: Plantae
- Clade: Tracheophytes
- Clade: Angiosperms
- Clade: Eudicots
- Clade: Rosids
- Order: Malvales
- Family: Malvaceae
- Genus: Grewia
- Species: G. flavescens

Binomial name
- Grewia flavescens Juss.

Synonyms
- List: Grewia aspera Schinz; Grewia bipartita Wall.; Grewia commutata DC.; Grewia fabreguesii E.Boudour.; Grewia homblei De Wild.; Grewia kapiriensis De Wild.; Grewia orientalis Gaertn.; Grewia platyclada K.Schum.; Vincentia flavescens (Juss.) Burret; Vincentia platyclada (K.Schum.) Burret; Vinticena flavescens (Juss.) Burret; Vinticena platyclada (K.Schum.) Burret

= Grewia flavescens =

Species of flowering plant

Grewia flavescens, called rough-leaved raisin, sandpaper raisin, and donkey berry (a name it shares with Grewia bicolor), is a species of flowering plant in the family Malvaceae, native to sub‑Saharan Africa, Yemen, Saudi Arabia, and India. It is considered to be an underutilized crop, both for its fruit and its use for livestock forage. Caterpillars of Anaphe reticulata have been found to feed on the foliage.

== Gallery ==
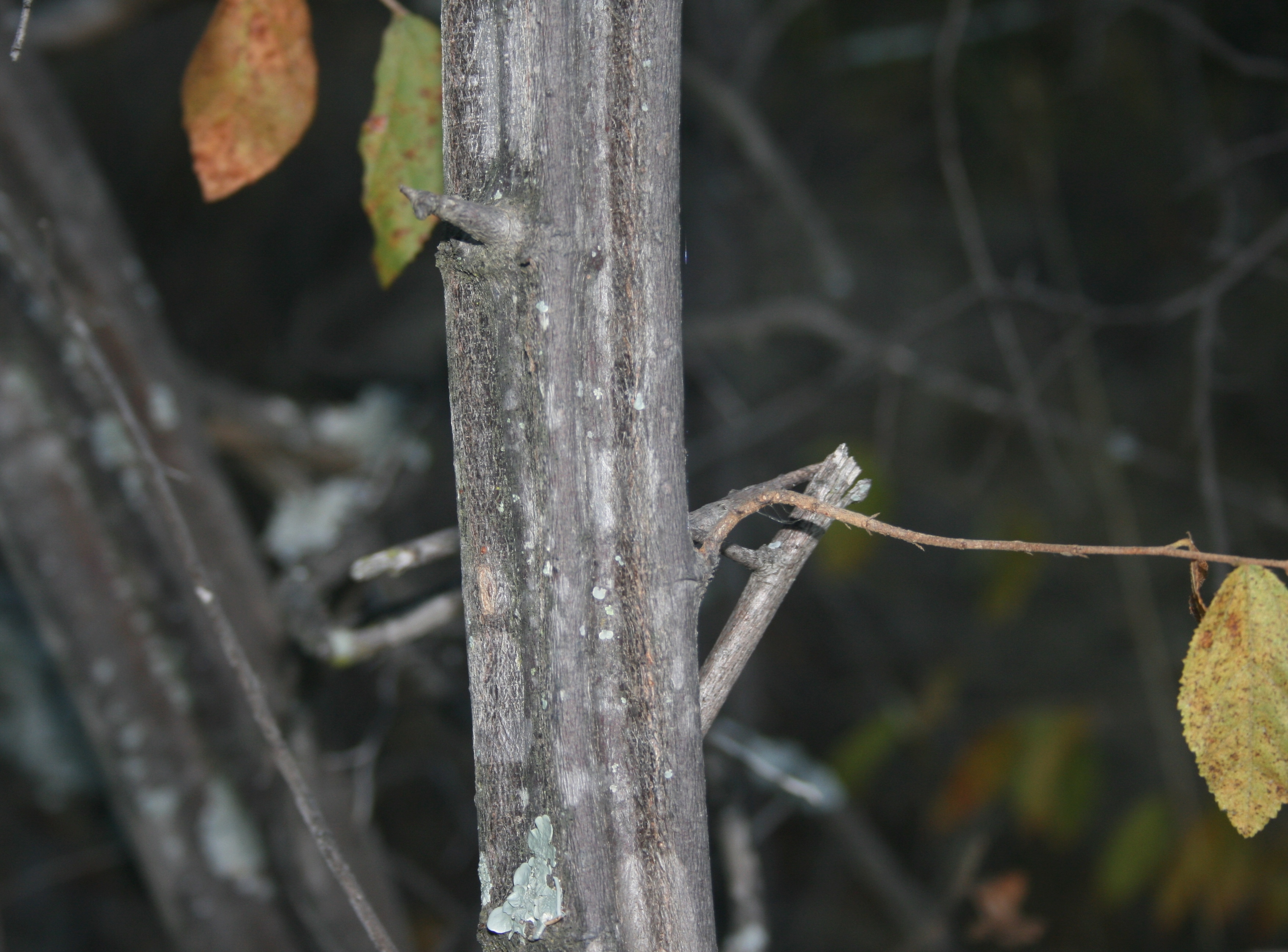
Larger stems are characteristically angular.

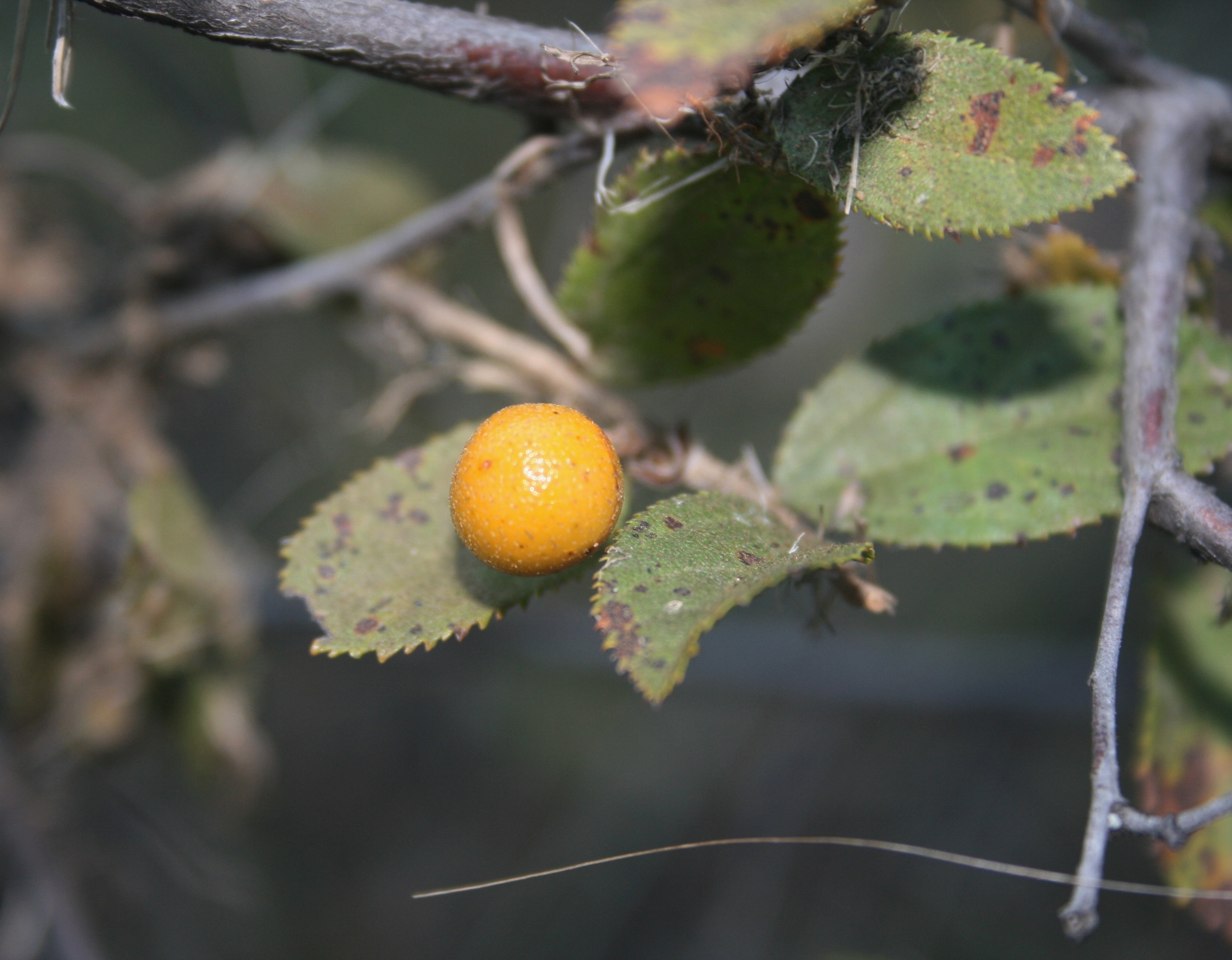
Ripe fruit, winter

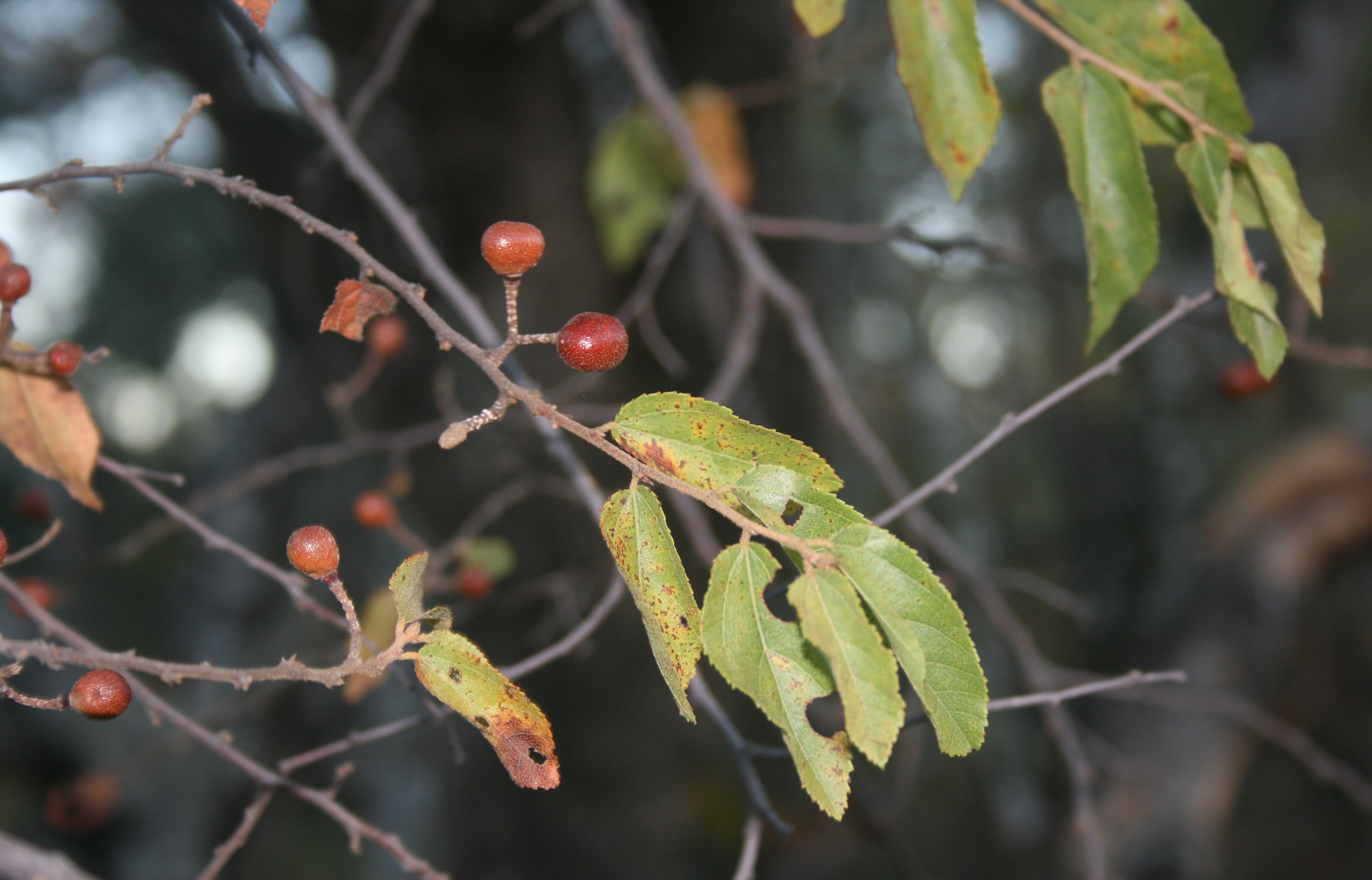
Dry fruit, winter
