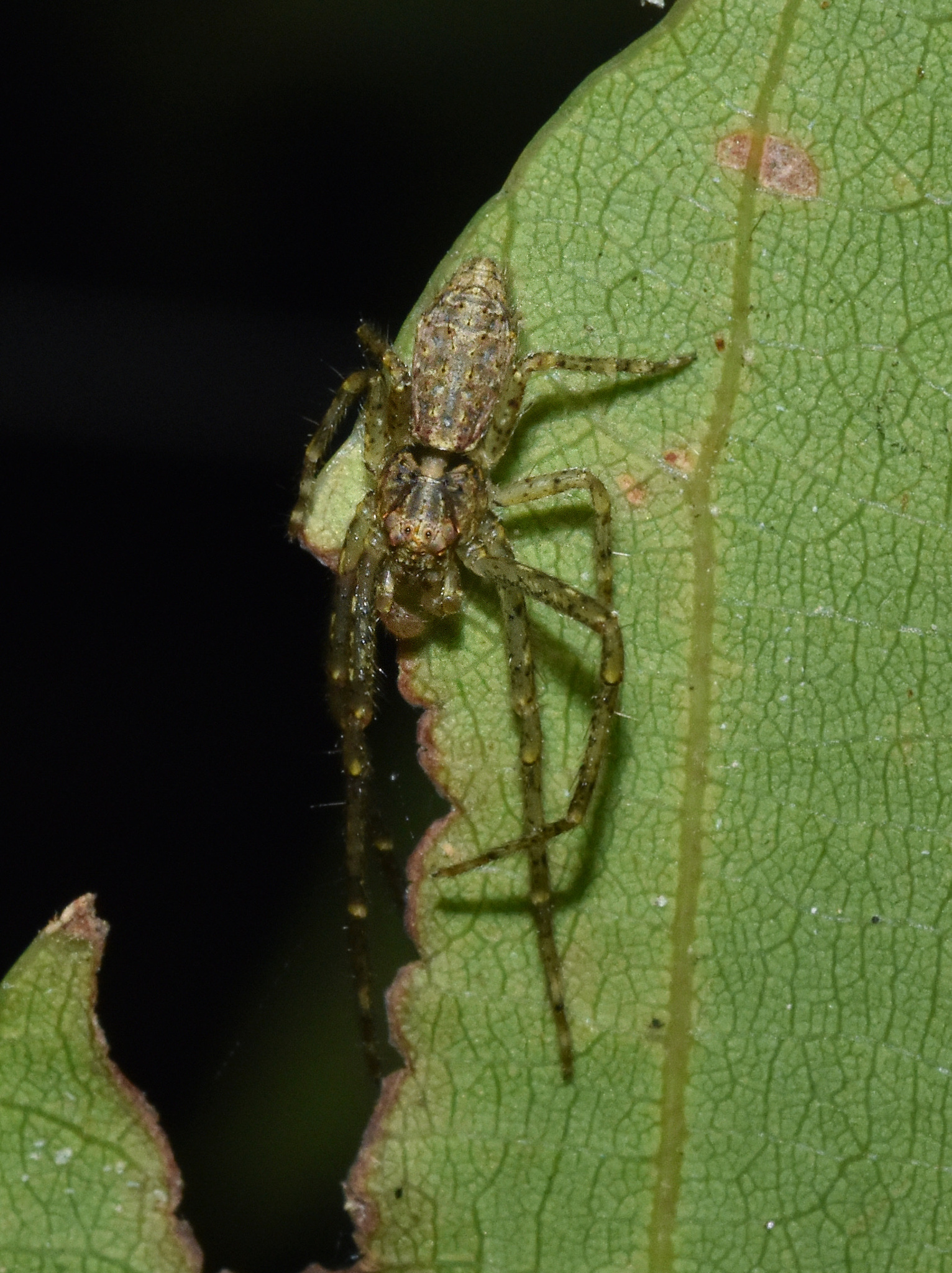
- T. natalensis from South Africa

Conservation status
- Least Concern (IUCN 3.1)

Scientific classification
- Kingdom: Animalia
- Phylum: Arthropoda
- Subphylum: Chelicerata
- Class: Arachnida
- Order: Araneae
- Infraorder: Araneomorphae
- Family: Thomisidae
- Genus: Tmarus
- Species: T. natalensis

Binomial name
- Tmarus natalensis Lessert, 1925

= Tmarus natalensis =

Natal Tmarus crab spider

Species of spider

Tmarus natalensis is a species of crab spider in the family Thomisidae. It is endemic to South Africa, where it was first described from Amanzimtoti in KwaZulu-Natal.

== Etymology ==
The species name natalensis refers to Natal, the former province of South Africa where the type specimen was collected.

== Distribution ==
Tmarus natalensis is widely distributed across South Africa, having been recorded from five provinces: Eastern Cape, KwaZulu-Natal, Limpopo, Mpumalanga, and Western Cape, with records ranging from 4 to 1,345 metres above sea level.

Specific localities include Amanzimtoti (the type locality), Richards Bay, Port Elizabeth, Coffee Bay, and various nature reserves and protected areas.

== Habitat ==
Tmarus natalensis is a free-living spider typically found on plants, usually sampled from trees. The species inhabits multiple biomes including Fynbos, Forest, Indian Ocean Coastal Belt, Savanna, and Thicket biomes. It has also been recorded in agricultural settings, particularly macadamia nut orchards.

== Description ==
The female of Tmarus natalensis remains unknown, as the single female specimen mentioned in early literature was subsequently lost.

The male has a total length of 5.5 mm, with a cephalothorax length of 2.5 mm and width of 2.2 mm.

The carapace coloration ranges from fawn to dark brown, while the opisthosoma is dark brown with a white ventral surface marked by a dark broad median line. The legs are fawn-colored with black mottling. The carapace is slightly longer than wide, with an almost straight anterior eye row and a recurved posterior eye row.

== Conservation ==
Tmarus natalensis is classified as Least Concern due to its wide geographical range across South Africa. The species is protected in three protected areas: Cwebe Nature Reserve, Ophathe Game Reserve, and Lekgalameetse Nature Reserve. There are no significant threats identified for this species, though additional sampling is needed to locate and describe the unknown female.

== Taxonomy ==
Tmarus natalensis is closely related to Tmarus africanus but can be distinguished by specific details in the structure of the male palp.
