= Tmarus planetarius =

Conservation status
- Least Concern (IUCN 3.1)

Scientific classification
- Kingdom: Animalia
- Phylum: Arthropoda
- Subphylum: Chelicerata
- Class: Arachnida
- Order: Araneae
- Infraorder: Araneomorphae
- Family: Thomisidae
- Genus: Tmarus
- Species: T. planetarius

Binomial name
- Tmarus planetarius Simon, 1903

Synonyms
- Tmarus pauliani Millot, 1942; Tmarus lesserti Lawrence, 1942

Species of spider

Tmarus planetarius is a species of crab spider in the family Thomisidae. It is widely distributed across sub-Saharan Africa.

== Etymology ==
The species name planetarius is derived from Latin, possibly referring to it also meaning "wandering".

== Distribution ==
Tmarus planetarius has been recorded from Guinea-Bissau, Sierra Leone, Ivory Coast, Nigeria, Cameroon, Democratic Republic of the Congo, Kenya, Malawi, and South Africa. In South Africa, it is known from three provinces: KwaZulu-Natal, Limpopo, and the Western Cape.

== Habitat ==
Tmarus planetarius is free-living on plants, usually found on trees. The species has been recorded from the Fynbos, Forest, Indian Ocean Coastal Belt, and Savanna biomes in South Africa, at elevations ranging from 7 to 1,411 meters above sea level.

== Description ==
Females have a total length of around 4.2 mm and a cephalothorax length of around 1.9 mm.

The carapace ranges from fawn to yellow in color, with the eye area appearing white and faint medio-lateral lines present. The opisthosoma is yellowish white to grey, mottled with black markings, while the ventral surface is pale yellow. The legs are yellow, with the first femur faintly tinted with grey.

The carapace is as wide as it is long and is clothed with numerous long spiniform setae. The abdomen is slightly longer than wide and also covered with numerous spiniform setae. The epigyne is large and distinct.

Males are similar to females but generally smaller, with a total length of 3.6-4.4 mm. The cephalothorax width is 1.6 mm (1.5-1.8 mm). Males have slightly longer legs and abdomen compared to their body size. The male pedipalp features a forked retrolateral tibial apophysis and a ventral tegular apophysis that is shorter than the retrolateral tibial apophysis.

Juveniles are similar in appearance to adults.

== Bionomics ==
Males have been collected in October and September, while females have been found in May, September, December, and February. In Zaire (now Democratic Republic of the Congo), a female specimen was collected from humus.

== Conservation status ==
Tmarus planetarius is listed as Least Concern due to its wide geographical range across Africa.The species is protected in several protected areas including Tembe Elephant Park, Ophathe Game Reserve, Nylsvley Nature Reserve, and Blouberg Nature Reserve. No significant threats have been identified for this species.
