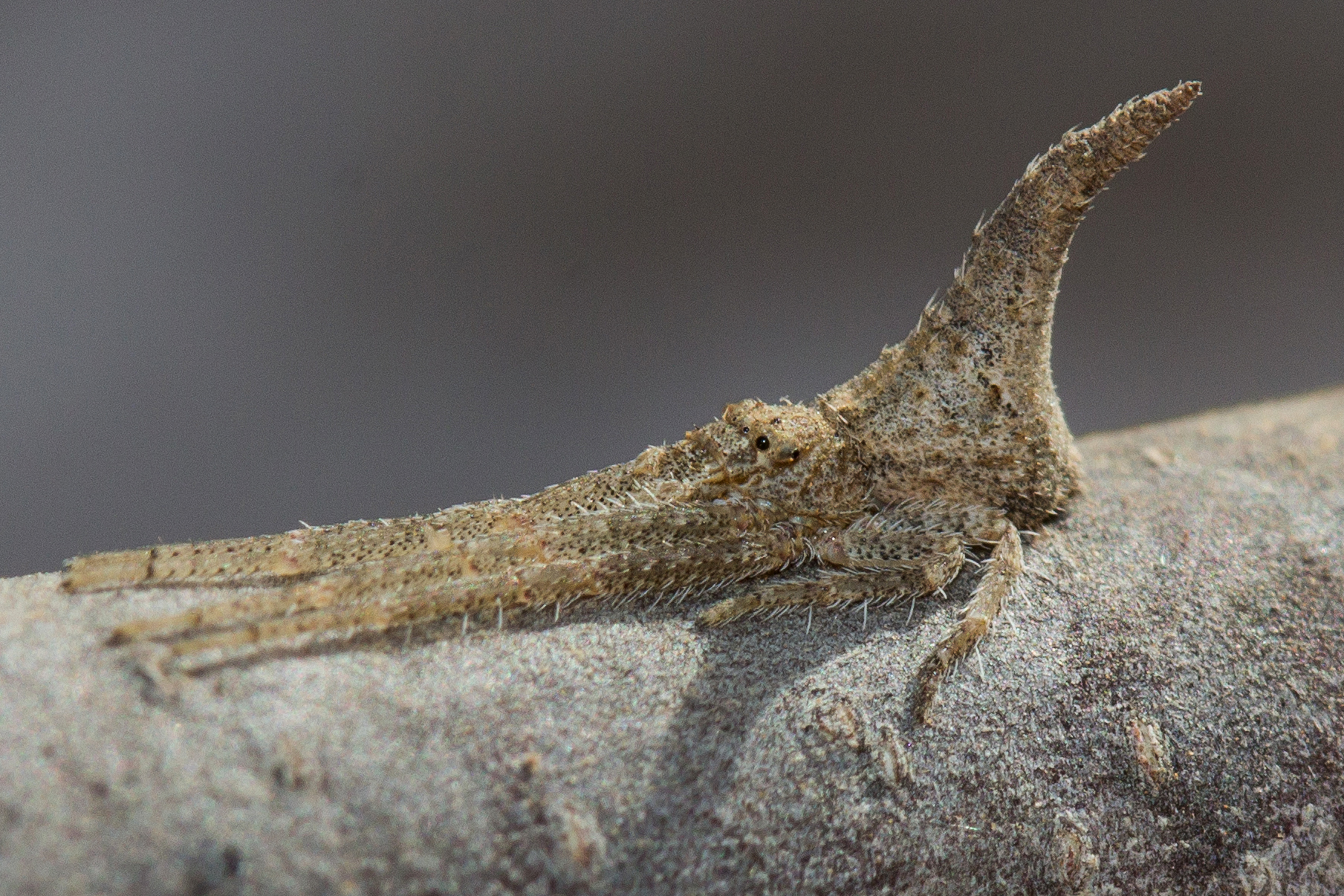

Scientific classification
- Kingdom: Animalia
- Phylum: Arthropoda
- Subphylum: Chelicerata
- Class: Arachnida
- Order: Araneae
- Infraorder: Araneomorphae
- Family: Thomisidae
- Genus: Tmarus
- Species: T. longicaudatus

Binomial name
- Tmarus longicaudatus Millot, 1942

= Tmarus longicaudatus =

Tailed Tmarus crab spider

Species of crab spider

Tmarus longicaudatus is a species of crab spider in the family Thomisidae. It is widely distributed across Africa and the Arabian Peninsula.

== Etymology ==
The species name longicaudatus is derived from Latin, meaning "long-tailed", referring to the distinctive elongated caudal tubercle (tail-like projection) found especially in females.

== Distribution ==
Tmarus longicaudatus has been recorded from Mauritania, Niger, Namibia, South Africa, Yemen, Saudi Arabia, and the United Arab Emirates. In South Africa, it is known from three provinces: KwaZulu-Natal, Limpopo, and the Western Cape.

== Habitat ==
The species is free-living on plants and is usually found on trees. It has been collected from both Fynbos and Savanna biomes in South Africa, at elevations ranging from 243 to 1,310 meters above sea level.

== Description ==
Tmarus longicaudatus exhibits sexual dimorphism typical of crab spiders. The males have a brownish and white mottled cephalothorax, while the opisthosoma is lighter and whitish, irregularly scattered with some grey and blackish spots that are more pronounced on the sides. There is a blackish medio-ventral band on the underside.

The sternum is mixed brown and white, and the mouthparts are light-colored. The legs are entirely light-colored, spotted with black at the insertions of spines and hairs. Males have a distinctive oblique headband of gentle slope, about the same height as the eye area.

The eyes are nearly equidistant, with the median trapezoid as high as it is wide at the base. The chelicerae are swollen with a sinuous outer edge, wider at the base than at the tip, marked with white and pale grey, and armed with more or less regular rows of spines.

Males have an elevated opisthosoma that is higher than it is wide, with a triangular profile. It is less than one and a half times longer than the cephalothorax, but its posterior end is extended by a curved, tail-like tubercle that is directed obliquely backward and upward, with a length nearly equal to that of the cephalothorax.

Females (immature specimens described) share the same general coloration and form as males, but have an even more developed caudal tubercle that is clearly longer than the opisthosoma proper and directed more distinctly backward. Two transverse blackish lines cross the dorsal face of the opisthosoma and flanks.

The spines on the body and legs are short and transparent but robust. On the dorsal face of the opisthosoma, they form four longitudinal rows.

== Conservation status ==
Tmarus longicaudatus is listed as Least Concern due to its wide geographical range across multiple countries. In South Africa, it is protected in two areas: Polokwane Nature Reserve and Cederberg Wilderness Area. There are no significant threats identified for this species.
