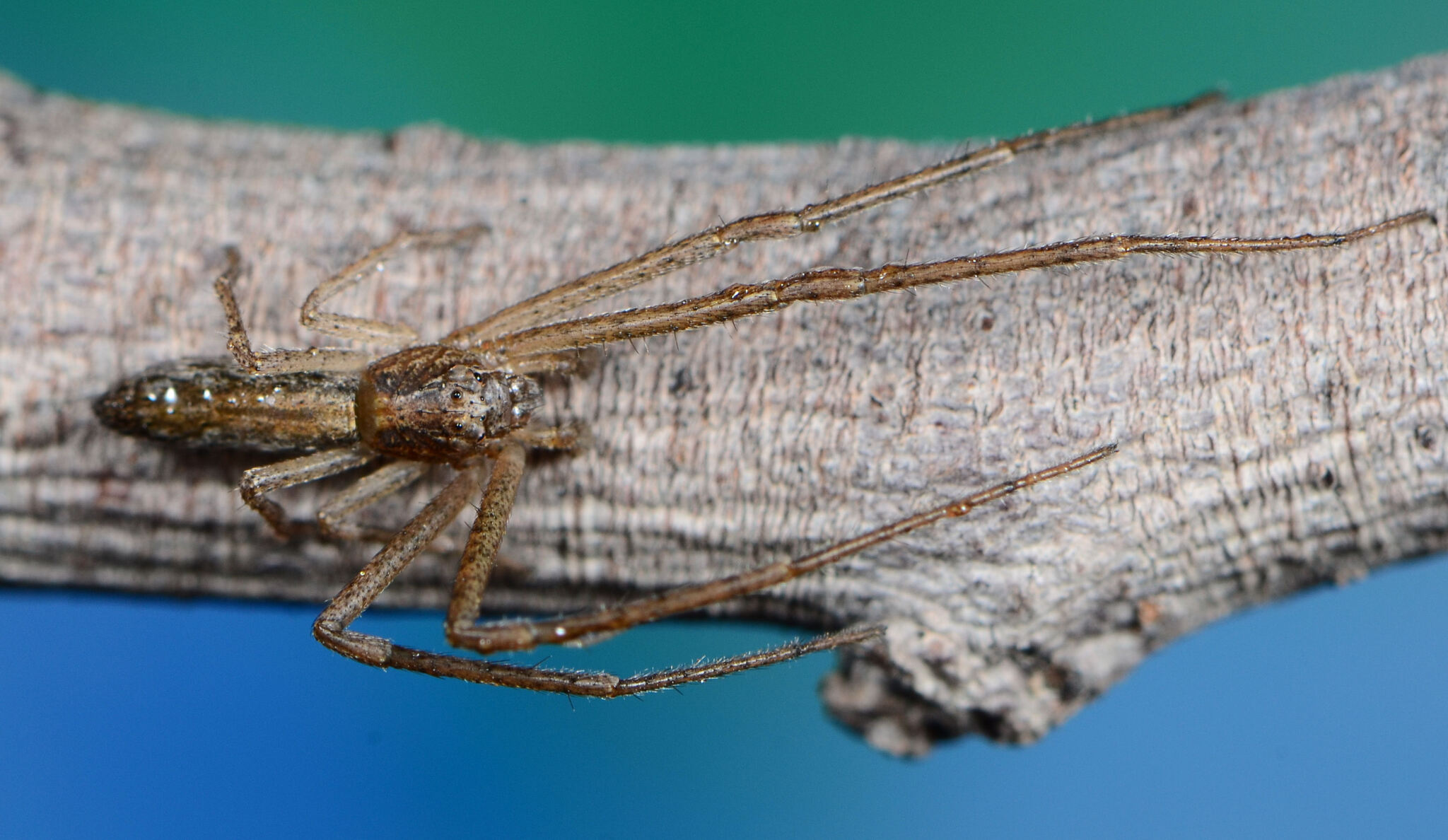
- male

Scientific classification
- Kingdom: Animalia
- Phylum: Arthropoda
- Subphylum: Chelicerata
- Class: Arachnida
- Order: Araneae
- Infraorder: Araneomorphae
- Family: Thomisidae
- Genus: Tmarus
- Species: T. guineensis

Binomial name
- Tmarus guineensis Millot, 1942

= Tmarus guineensis =

Guinea Tmarus crab spider

Species of spider

Tmarus guineensis is a species of crab spider of the genus Tmarus. It is found in Guinea and South Africa.

== Etymology ==
The species name guineensis refers to Guinea, the West African country where the type specimen was first collected.

== Distribution ==
Tmarus guineensis has been recorded from Guinea in West Africa and South Africa. In South Africa, it has been sampled from the Northern Cape Province (Springbok) and Western Cape Province (Aardvark Nature Reserve). The species is expected to occur in countries between Guinea and South Africa, but has not yet been documented from intermediate locations.

== Habitat ==
Tmarus guineensis is a free-living species found on plants. In South Africa, specimens have been collected from the Succulent Karoo biome.

== Description ==
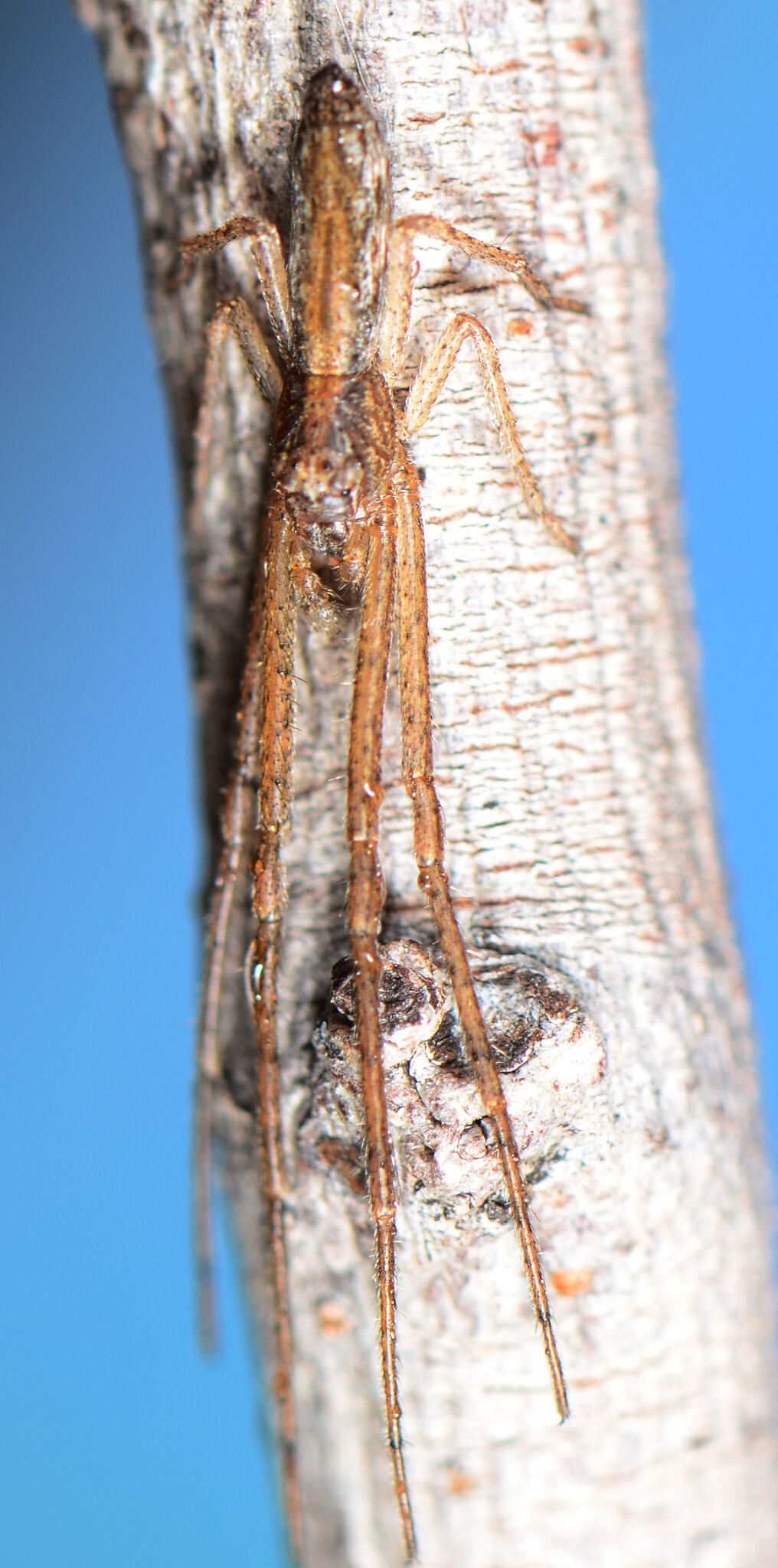
male

Only males of this species have been collected and described by scientists. Males are small spiders with a total length of 3.9 mm. The cephalothorax is fawn to grey in color with white mottling, while the eye area appears grey. The opisthosoma is notably longer than the cephalothorax and has an elongated shape that widens towards the rear, bearing numerous erect bristles. The opisthosoma is ivory colored with greyish-black markings and has a broad grey line on the underside. The legs are pale yellow with grey mottling.

The species can be distinguished from related African crab spiders by the distinctive shape of its male reproductive structures and the characteristic elongated abdomen with a distinct tubercle.

== Conservation status ==
Tmarus guineensis is listed as Least Concern due to its wide geographical range spanning from West Africa to South Africa. There are no significant threats identified for this species, though additional sampling is needed to collect female specimens.
