= Tmarus hystrix =

Scientific classification
- Kingdom: Animalia
- Phylum: Arthropoda
- Subphylum: Chelicerata
- Class: Arachnida
- Order: Araneae
- Infraorder: Araneomorphae
- Family: Thomisidae
- Genus: Tmarus
- Species: T. hystrix

Binomial name
- Tmarus hystrix (Simon, 1895)

Synonyms
- Peritraeus hystrix Simon, 1895

Species of spider

Tmarus hystrix is a species of spider in the family Thomisidae, found in India and Sri Lanka.
