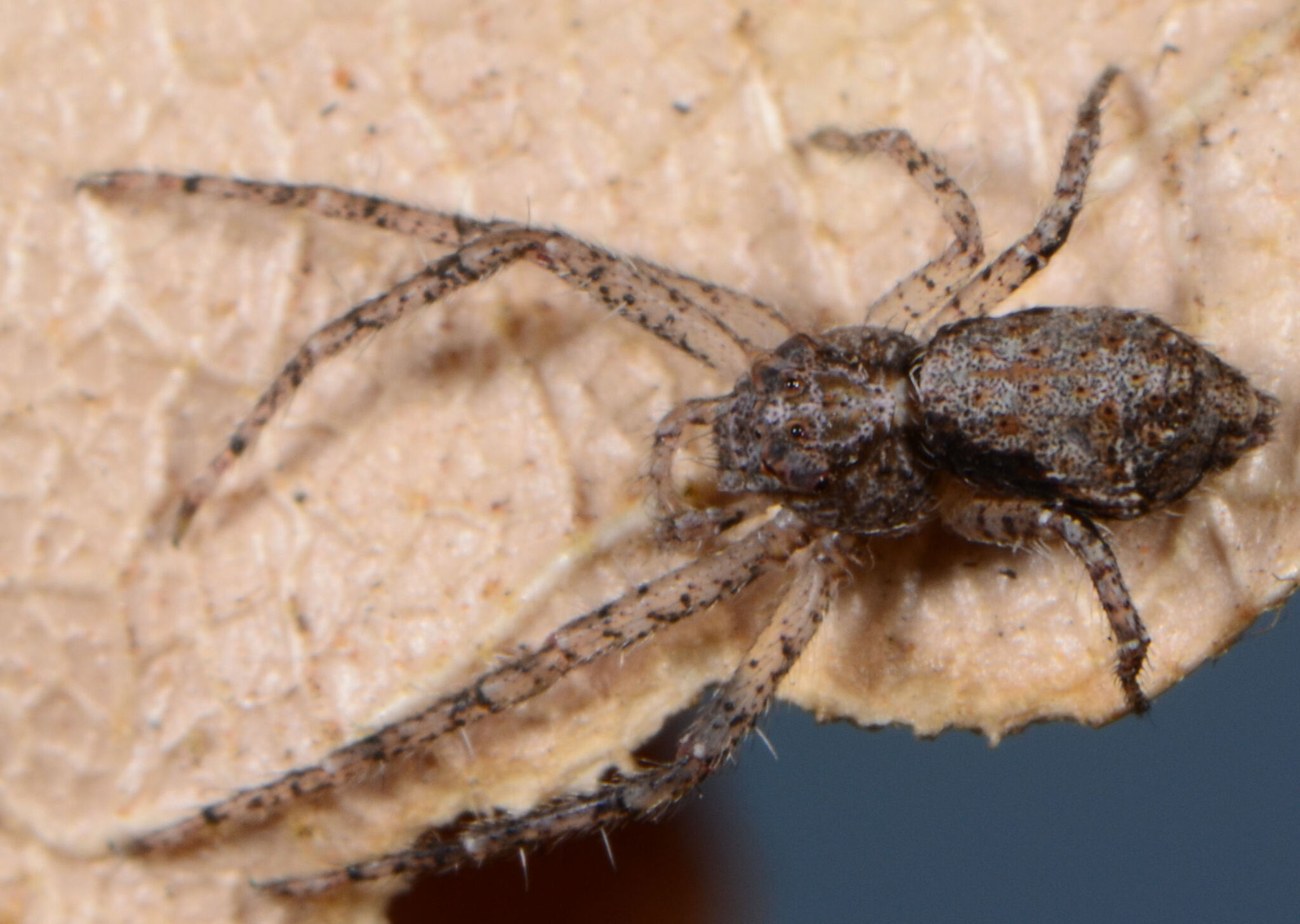
- female
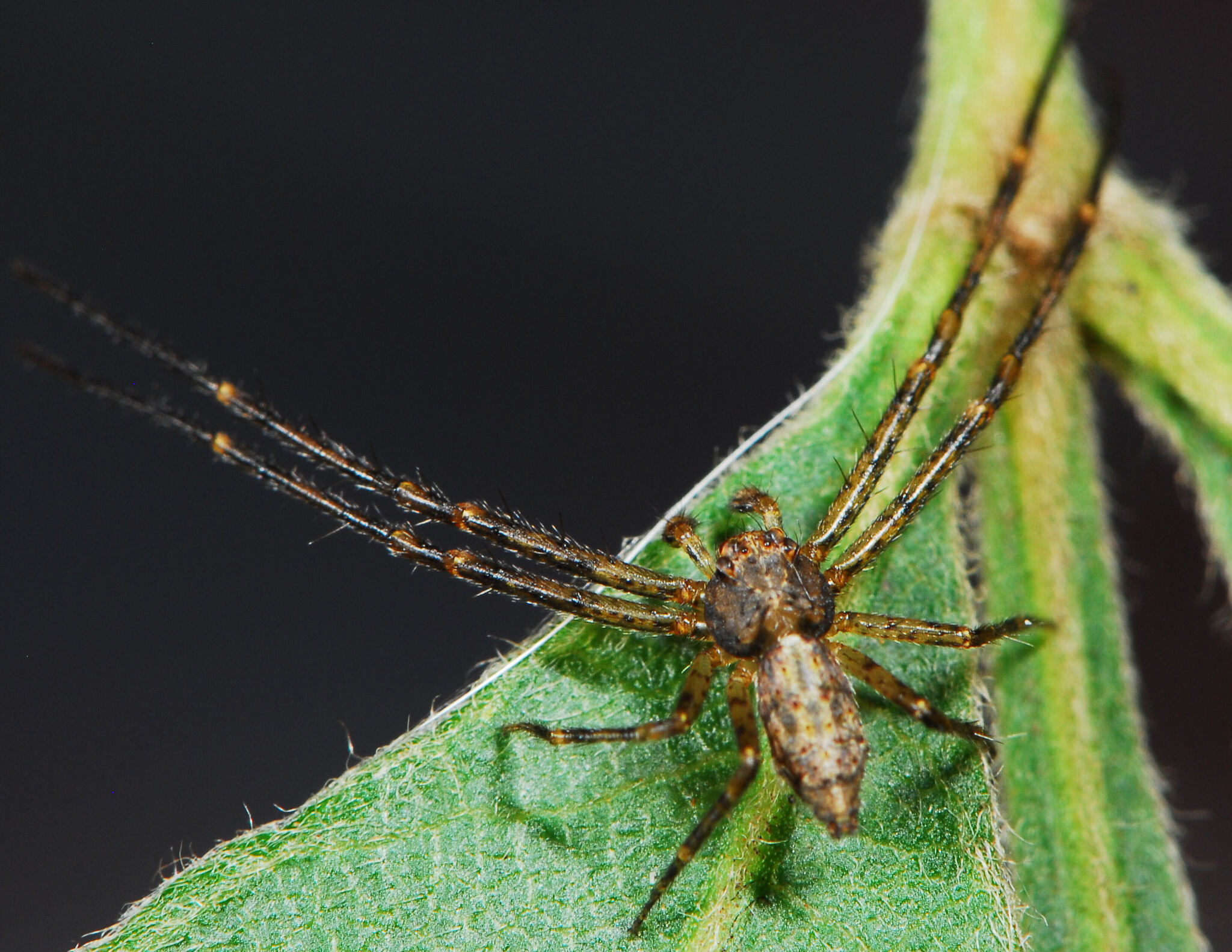
- male

Scientific classification
- Kingdom: Animalia
- Phylum: Arthropoda
- Subphylum: Chelicerata
- Class: Arachnida
- Order: Araneae
- Infraorder: Araneomorphae
- Family: Thomisidae
- Genus: Tmarus
- Species: T. comellinii

Binomial name
- Tmarus comellinii Garcia-Neto, 1989

Synonyms
- Tmarus hirsutus Comellini, 1955 (preoccupied)

= Tmarus comellinii =

Comellinii's Tmarus crab spider

Species of spider

Tmarus comellinii is a species of crab spider in the family Thomisidae. It is found from the Democratic Republic of the Congo to South Africa.

== Distribution ==
Tmarus comellinii has been recorded from several African countries, ranging from the Democratic Republic of the Congo to South Africa. In South Africa, it has been found in nine provinces.

The species has been recorded from the following South African provinces: Eastern Cape, Free State, Gauteng, KwaZulu-Natal, Limpopo, Mpumalanga, Northern Cape, North West, and Western Cape.

== Habitat ==
Tmarus comellinii is a free-living species found on plants, usually trees. At Nylsvley Nature Reserve, it has been recorded from trees such as Combretum molle. The species has been sampled from all South African biomes except the Desert and Succulent Karoo biomes. It has also been found in avocado and mango orchards.

== Description ==
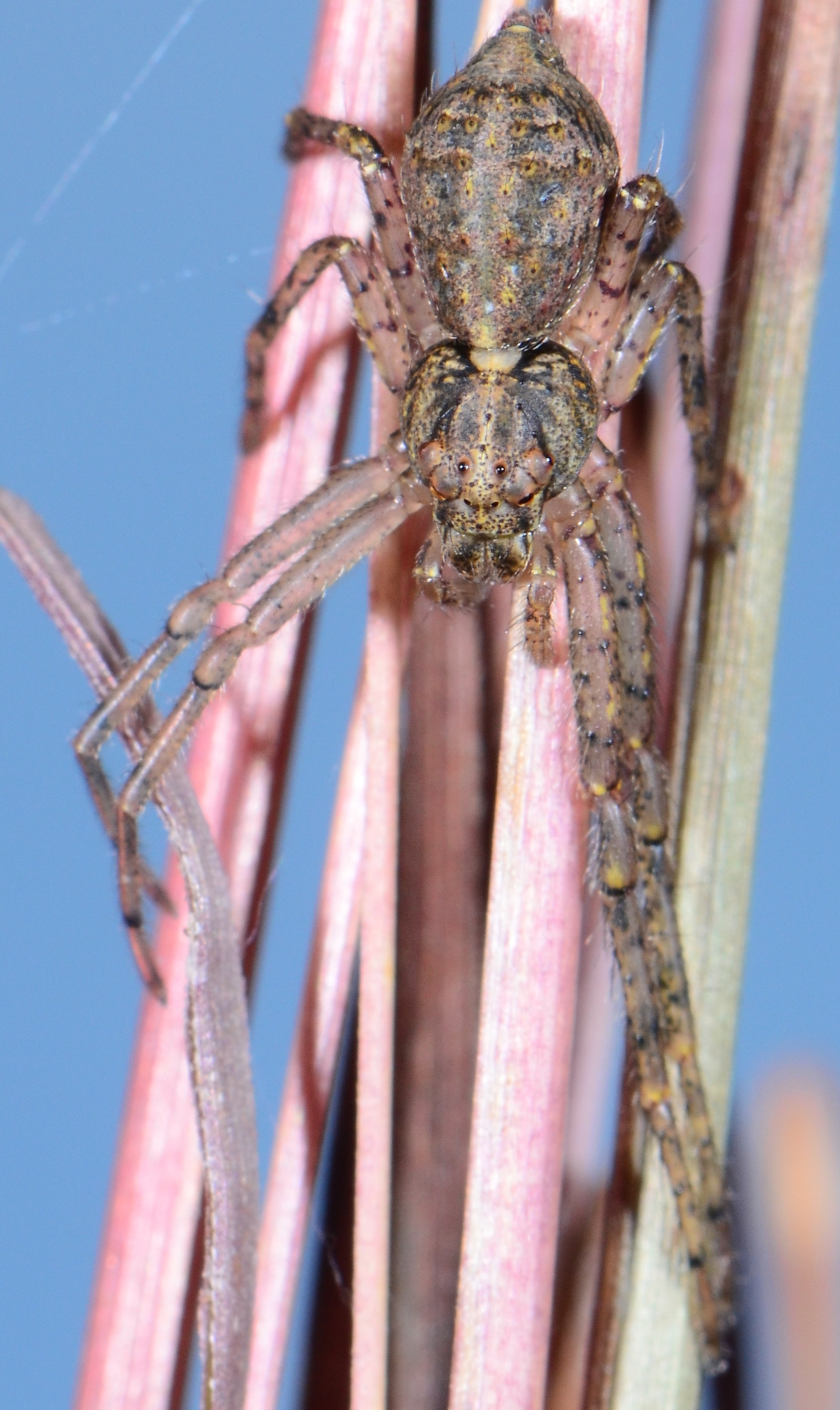
female

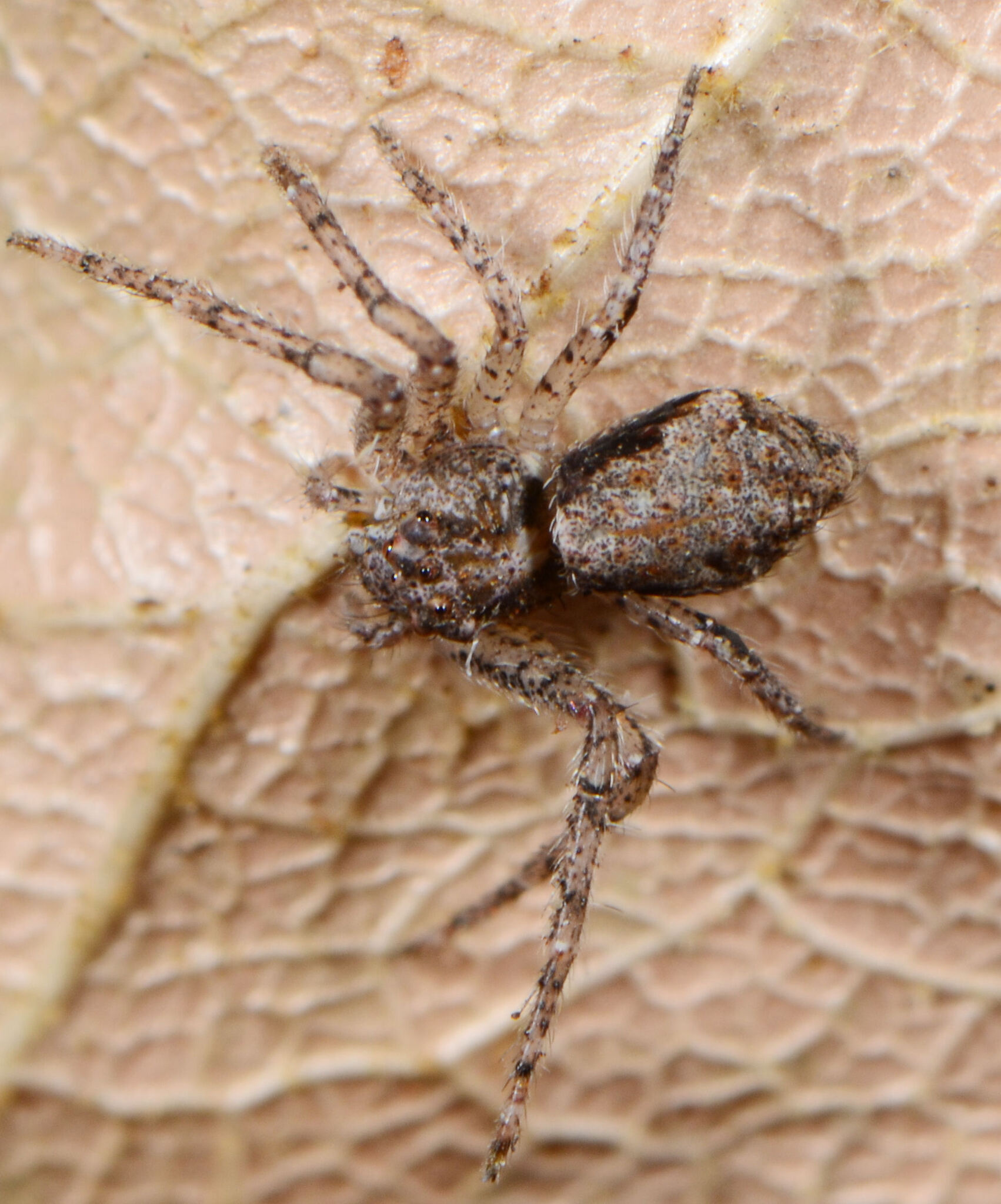
female

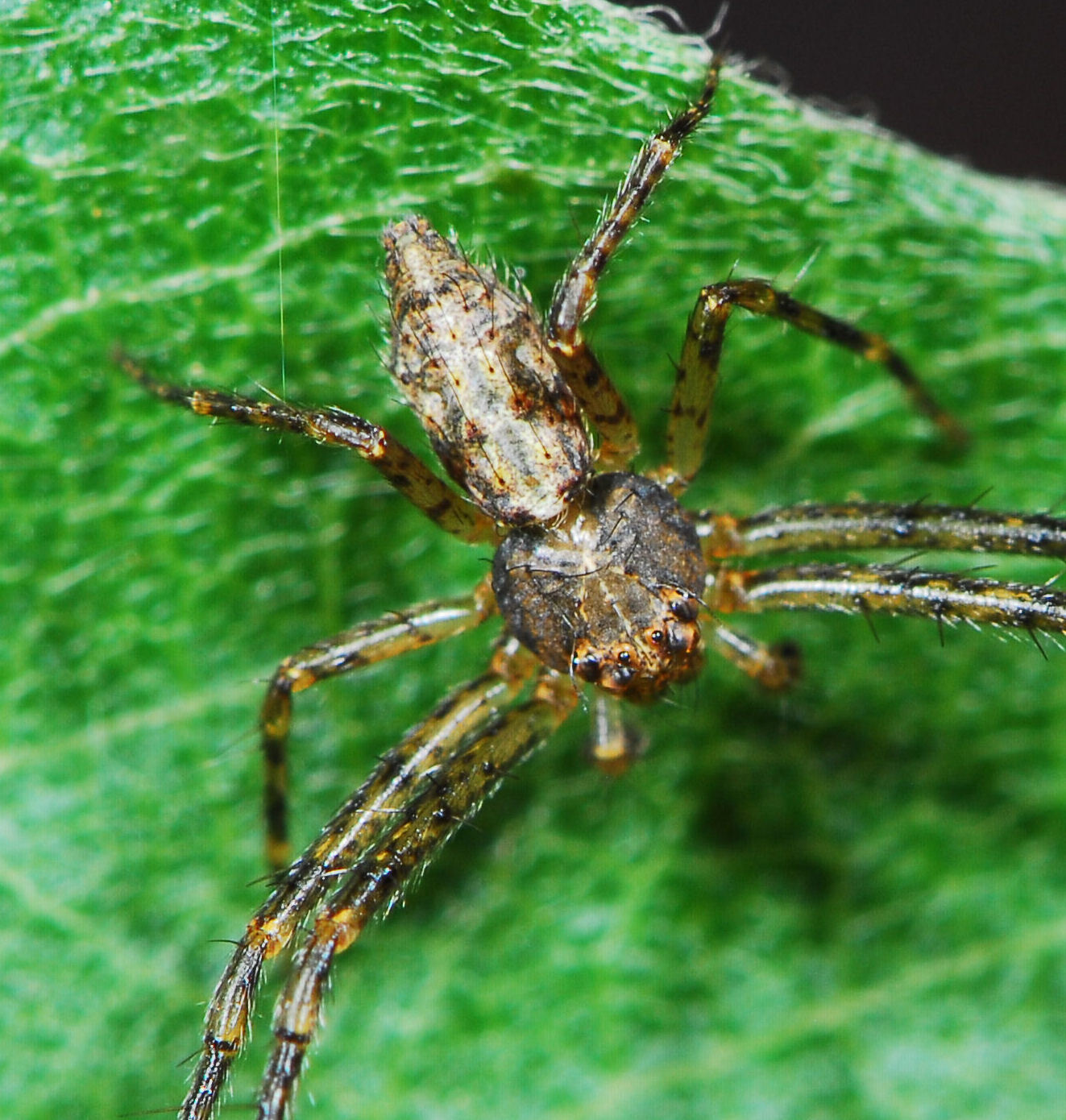
male

Females have an ivory general coloration with light brown spots and a dark brown posterior slope of the cephalothorax. The upper surface of the chelicerae is covered with spines, and the patella, tibia, and tarsus of the pedipalp have more robust spines on the underside than those of the chelicerae. The femur of this appendage has about fifteen spines of various sizes on the underside.

The sternum is spiny, and the sides are bordered with increasingly fine hairs toward the rear. The labial piece and maxillary plates are covered with spines. The anterior border of the labrum has eight forward-pointing spiniform hairs. The abdominal tubercle is very prominent and quite elongated.

Body length reaches 9 mm.

== Etymology ==
The species name comellinii honors André Comellini, who first described this spider in 1955.

== Taxonomy ==
The species was originally described as Tmarus hirsutus by Comellini in 1955. However, this name was preoccupied by Tmarus hirsutus Mello-Leitão, 1929, creating a case of secondary homonymy. Garcia-Neto proposed the replacement name Tmarus comellinii in 1989, honoring the original describer.

== Conservation ==
The species is listed as Least Concern due to its wide geographical range. It has been recorded in more than 10 protected areas, including Ndumo Game Reserve, Polokwane Nature Reserve, Lekgalameetse Nature Reserve, and Blouberg Nature Reserve. There are no significant threats to this species, and no conservation actions are recommended.
