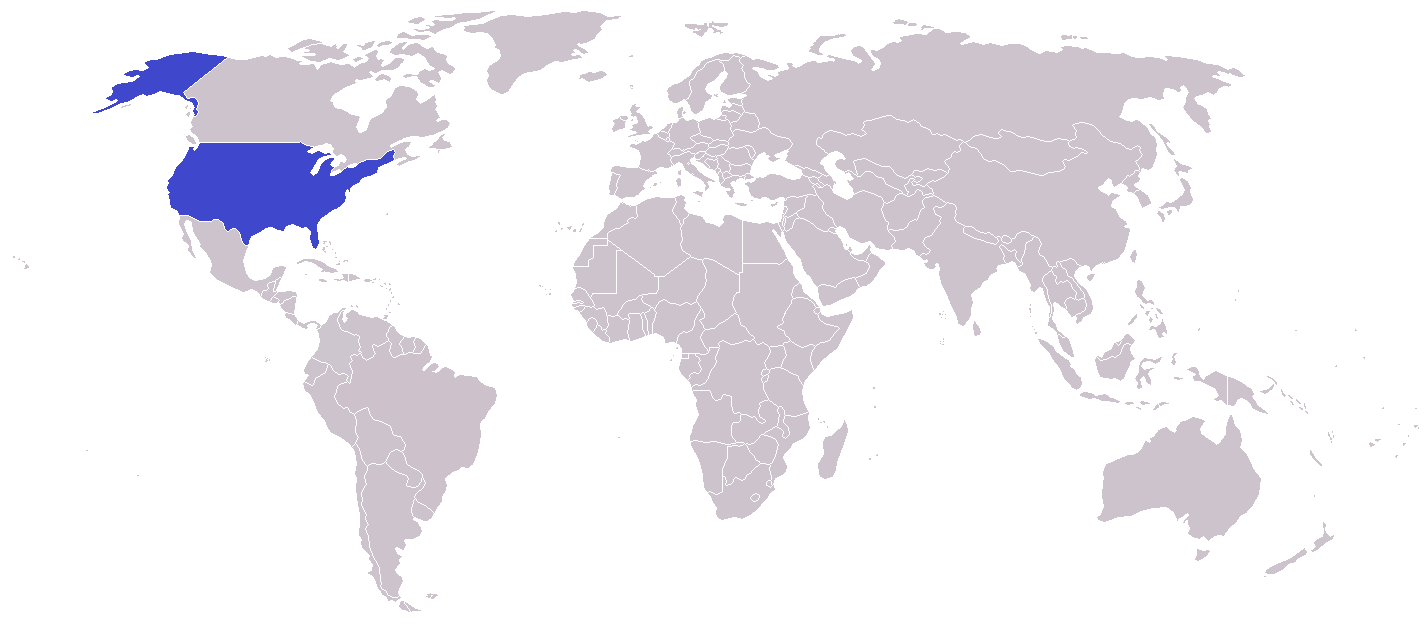

Scientific classification
- Kingdom: Animalia
- Phylum: Arthropoda
- Subphylum: Chelicerata
- Class: Arachnida
- Order: Araneae
- Infraorder: Araneomorphae
- Family: Thomisidae
- Genus: Tmarus
- Species: T. minutus

Binomial name
- Tmarus minutus Banks, 1904

= Tmarus minutus =

Species of spider

Tmarus minutus is a species of crab spider in the family Thomisidae. It is found in the United States.
