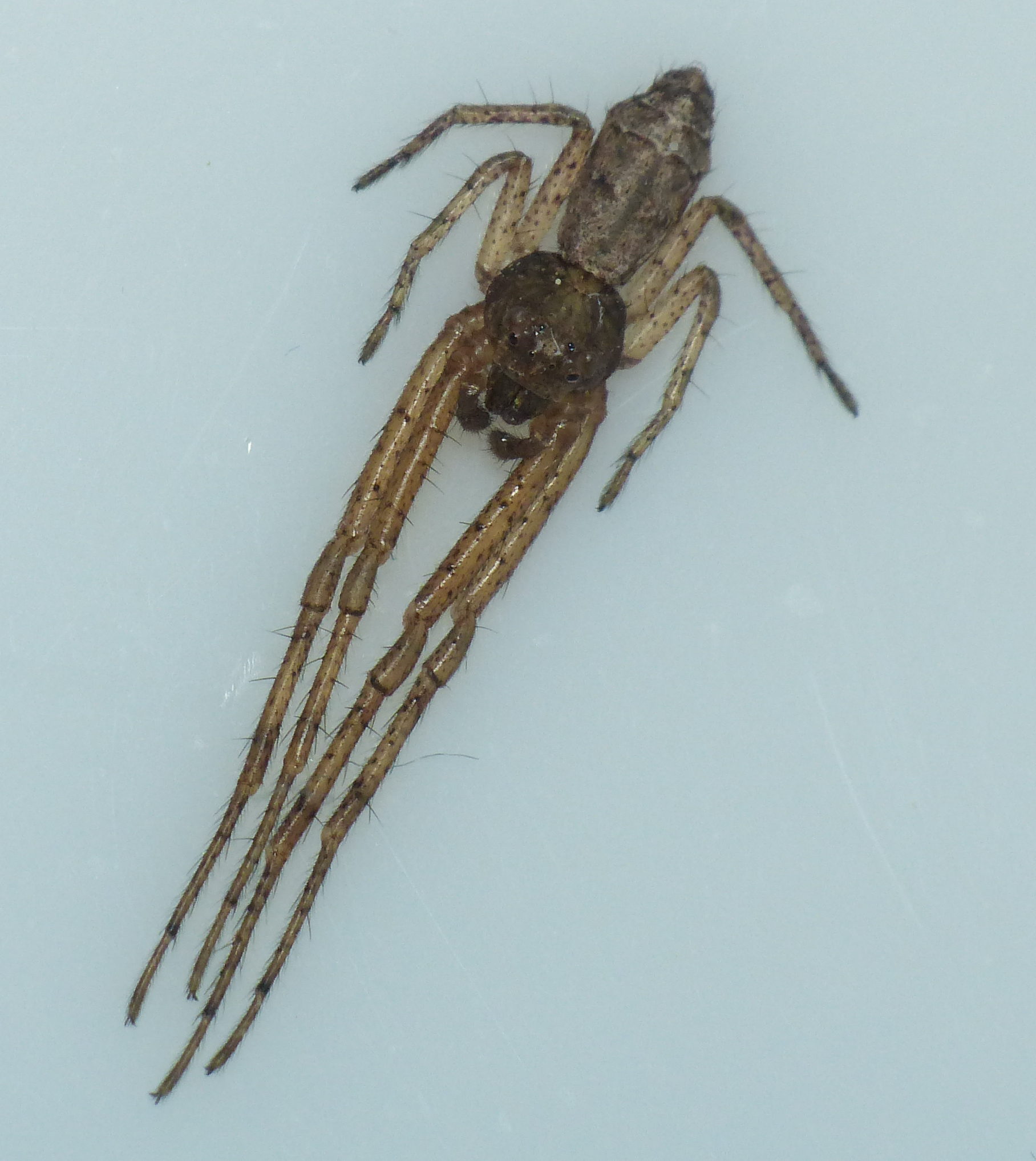

Scientific classification
- Domain: Eukaryota
- Kingdom: Animalia
- Phylum: Arthropoda
- Subphylum: Chelicerata
- Class: Arachnida
- Order: Araneae
- Infraorder: Araneomorphae
- Family: Thomisidae
- Genus: Tmarus
- Species: T. angulatus

Binomial name
- Tmarus angulatus (Walckenaer, 1837)

= Tmarus angulatus =

Species of spider

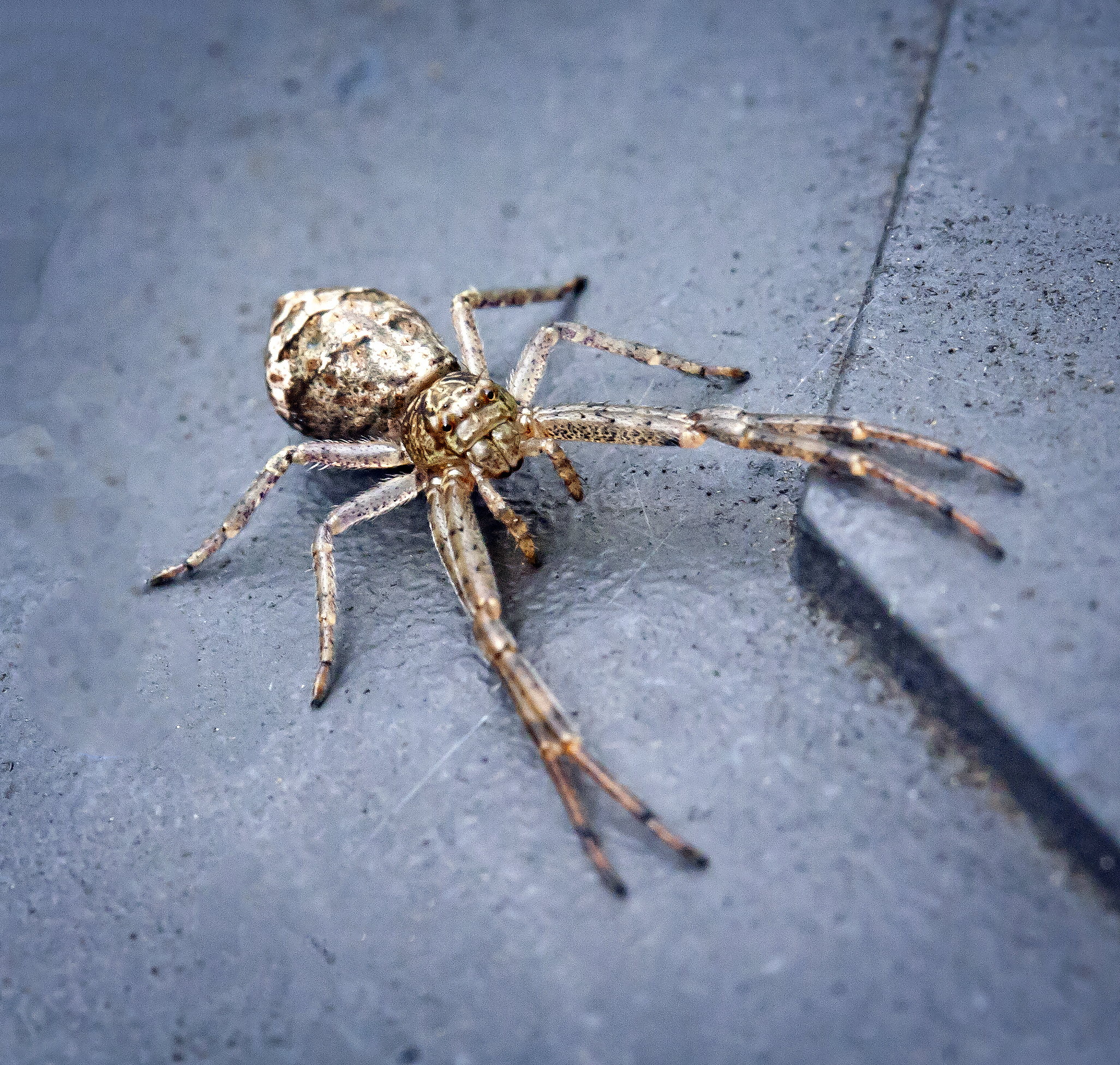
Tmarus angulatus female

Tmarus angulatus is a species of crab spider in the family Thomisidae. It is found in North America.

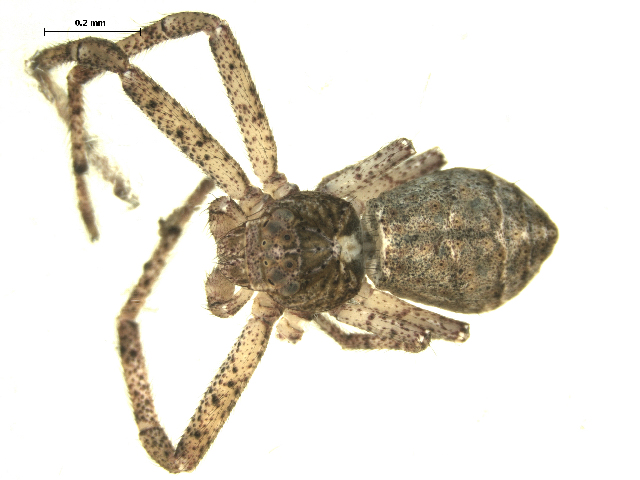
