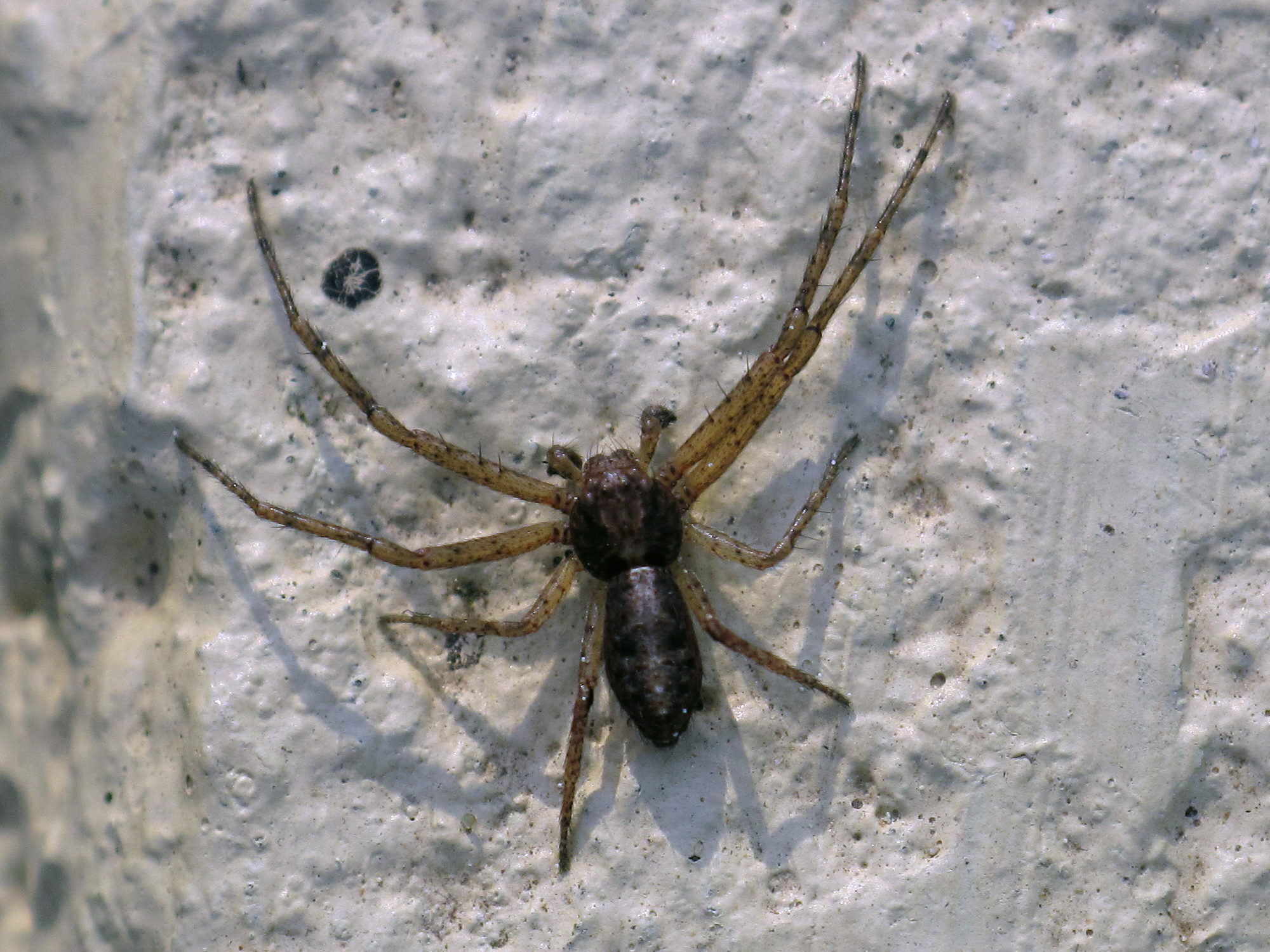
- Male
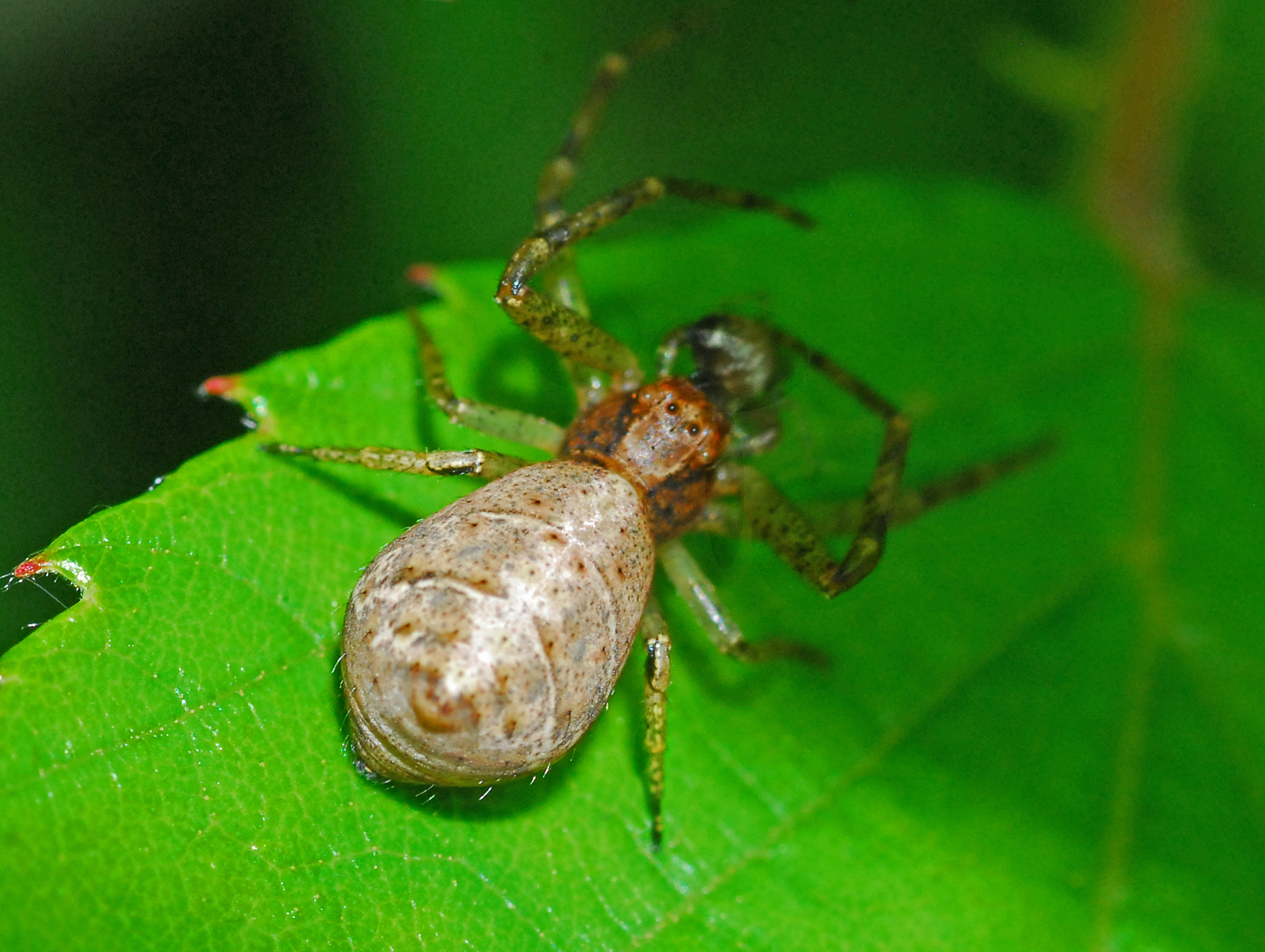
- Possible female

Scientific classification
- Domain: Eukaryota
- Kingdom: Animalia
- Phylum: Arthropoda
- Subphylum: Chelicerata
- Class: Arachnida
- Order: Araneae
- Infraorder: Araneomorphae
- Family: Thomisidae
- Genus: Tmarus
- Species: T. piger

Binomial name
- Tmarus piger (Walckenaer, 1802)

Synonyms
- Aranea pigra Walckenaer, 1802; Aranea bilineata Walckenaer, 1802; Thomisus pigrus (Walckenaer, 1802); Thomisus bilineatus (Walckenaer, 1802); Thomisus lynceus Latreille, 1806; Xysticus cuneolus C. L. Koch, 1835; Thomisus piger (Walckenaer, 1837); Thomisus cuneatus Walckenaer, 1841; Monastes lapidarius Lucas, 1846; Thomisus atomarius Blackwall, 1861; Xysticus polonicus Taczanowski, 1867; Tmarus piger (Walckenaer, 1802); Monaeses piger (Walckenaer, 1802); Monaeses cuneolus (C. L. Koch, 1835); Tmarus lapidarius (Lucas, 1846); Tmarus amoenus Kishida, 1931; Tmarus polonicus (Taczanowski, 1867)

= Tmarus piger =

Species of spider

Tmarus piger is a species of crab spider belonging to the family Thomisidae.

== Taxonomy ==
The species was first described by Charles Athanase Walckenaer in 1802 as Aranea piger. In the same work he described Aranea bilineata, now regarded as a synonym of this species. In 1805, Walckenaer transferred both species to his new genus Thomisus. In 1875, Eugène Simon made it the type species of his new genus Tmarus.

== Description ==
Tmarus piger can reach a body length of about 3.5–4 mm (0.14–0.16 in) in males, of about 5.9–6 mm (0.23–0.24 in) in females. The carapace is brownish, with a brown-grey band on each sides and small spines. Sometimes it is entirely yellow-brown or black-brown. The abdomen (opisthosoma) is highly variable in colour and markings. Usually it varies from silvery-grey to dark brown with dark or light transverse lines. Sometimes may appears orange-red with a whitish back. It is rather high, V-like compressed, caudally extended, with a small tubercle on the posterior part. The legs are lightly annulated with dark brown and show short spines arising from black spots. The palpal bulbs of the males, located at the end of the pedipalps, are round to longish oval.

== Biology ==
These rather uncommon crab spiders can be found in spring and summer. Usually they stay on thin branches, stretching the front two pairs of legs. Frequently they catch small ants. The egg cocoon is laid out in a folded leaf of grass.

== Distribution and habitat ==
This species is present in the Palearctic realm, in Europe (Austria, Belarus, Belgium, Bulgaria, Croatia, Czech Republic, France, Germany, Greece, Hungary, Italy, Lithuania, Republic of Moldova, Poland, Portugal, Romania, Slovakia, Slovenia, Spain, Switzerland, The Netherlands, Ukraine and Yugoslavia), Turkey, Caucasus, Kazakhstan, European Russia up to Far East, China, Korea and Japan. These spiders occur in many different habitats, in warm areas, in bogs and swamps, in grasslands, open forests, bushes and hedges. Usually they can be found on leaves, branches, twigs and tree barks, where they are well camouflaged.
