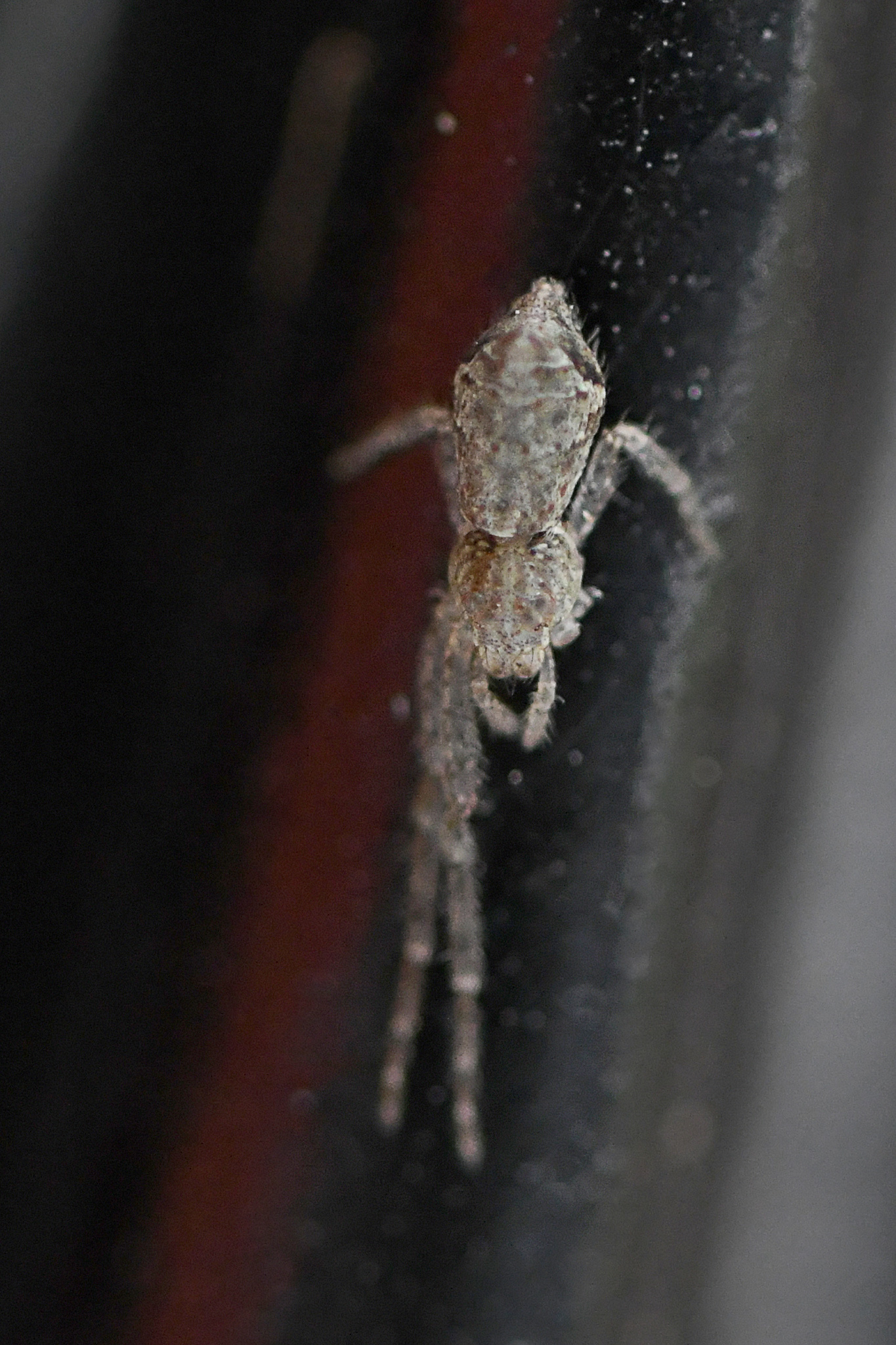

Scientific classification
- Kingdom: Animalia
- Phylum: Arthropoda
- Subphylum: Chelicerata
- Class: Arachnida
- Order: Araneae
- Infraorder: Araneomorphae
- Family: Thomisidae
- Genus: Tmarus
- Species: T. cancellatus

Binomial name
- Tmarus cancellatus Thorell, 1899

Synonyms
- Tmarus semicretaceus Simon, 1907

= Tmarus cancellatus =

Cameroon Tmarus crab spider

Species of crab spider

Tmarus cancellatus is a species of crab spider in the family Thomisidae. It is found across sub-Saharan Africa, from West Africa to southern Africa. The species is also known by the common name Cameroon Tmarus crab spider.

== Taxonomy ==
Tmarus cancellatus was first described by Tamerlan Thorell in 1899 from specimens collected in Cameroon. In 1907, Eugène Simon described Tmarus semicretaceus from the same region, which was later determined to be a junior synonym of T. cancellatus by Comellini in 1955.

== Distribution ==
Tmarus cancellatus has a wide distribution across sub-Saharan Africa. It has been recorded from Ivory Coast, Gabon, Nigeria, Cameroon, Republic of the Congo, Equatorial Guinea (Bioko), Zimbabwe, and South Africa.

In South Africa, the species is known from Eastern Cape, KwaZulu-Natal, Limpopo, and Mpumalanga. Notable locations include the Kruger National Park, iSimangaliso Wetland Park, and Polokwane Nature Reserve.

== Habitat ==
Tmarus cancellatus is a free-living spider that inhabits plants, typically found on trees. In South Africa, it has been recorded from various biomes including Forest, Savanna, Indian Ocean Coastal Belt, and Thicket biomes. The species occurs at elevations ranging from 51 to 1,310 m above sea level.

== Conservation status ==
Tmarus cancellatus is classified as Least Concern due to its wide geographical range across Africa. In South Africa, the species is found in several protected areas and faces no significant threats.

== Description ==
Females of Tmarus cancellatus reach a body length of 5.75 mm, while a larger specimen from Basoko measured 7.5 mm. The legs are light brown with white markings along their entire length, except on the underside of the anterior segments. The chelicerae are dull white on top, with this white coloration dominating the entire body, particularly in females where the upper surface is almost completely white.
