= Tmarus floridensis =

Scientific classification
- Domain: Eukaryota
- Kingdom: Animalia
- Phylum: Arthropoda
- Subphylum: Chelicerata
- Class: Arachnida
- Order: Araneae
- Infraorder: Araneomorphae
- Family: Thomisidae
- Genus: Tmarus
- Species: T. floridensis

Binomial name
- Tmarus floridensis Keyserling, 1884

Species of spider

Tmarus floridensis is a species of crab spider in the family Thomisidae. It is found in the United States.
