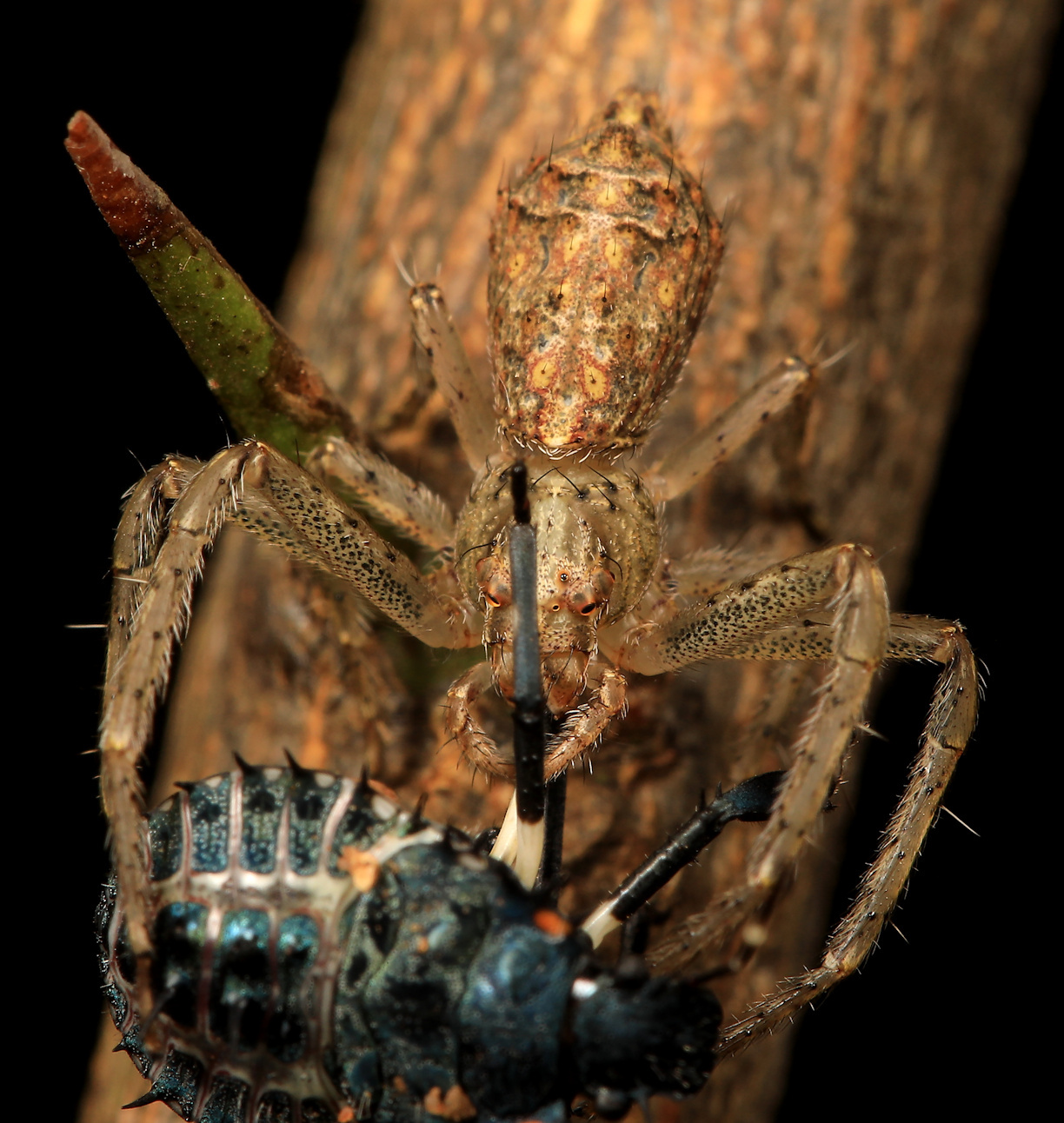
- T. africanus from South Africa
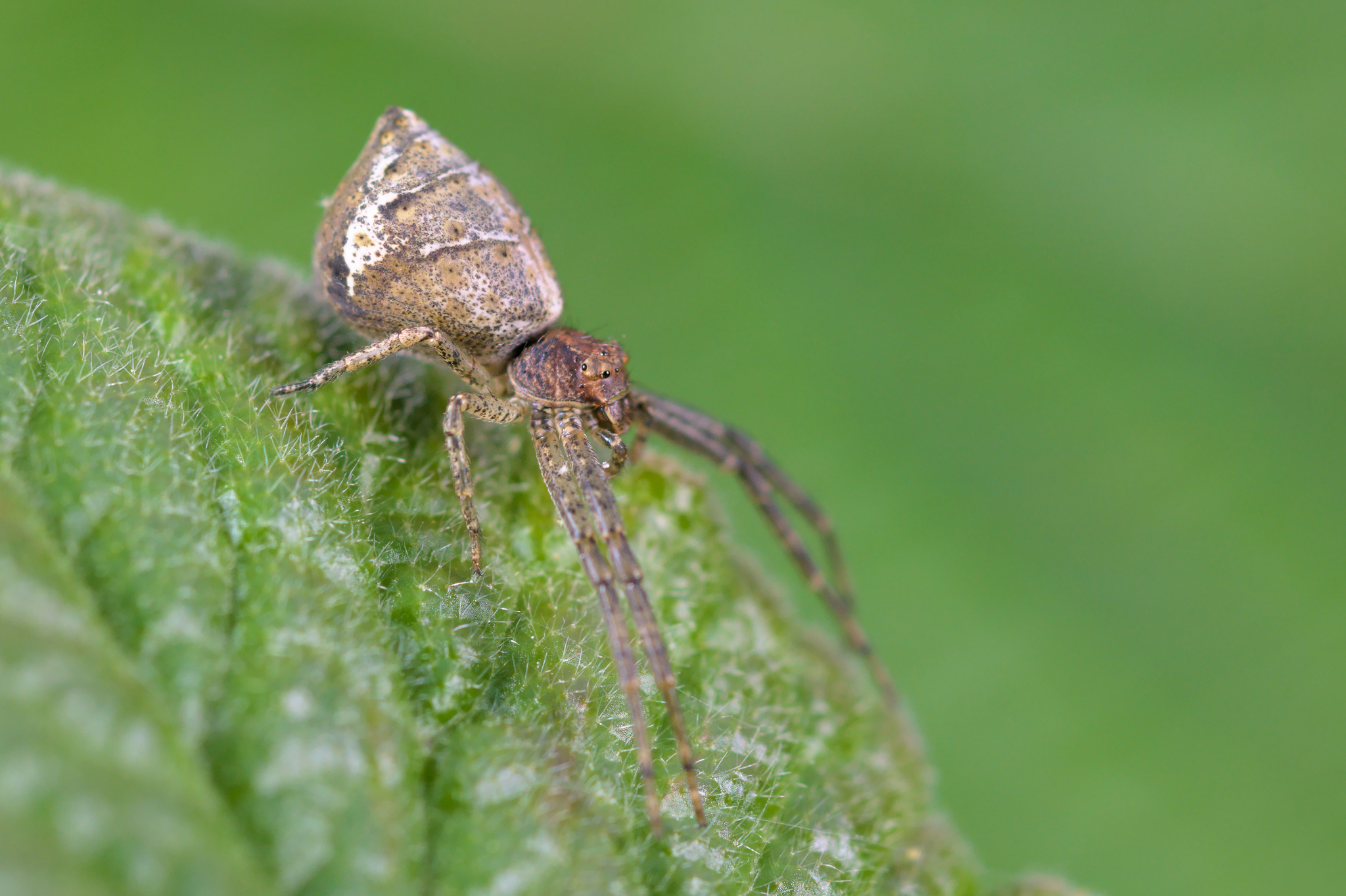
- T. piger from Belgium

Scientific classification
- Kingdom: Animalia
- Phylum: Arthropoda
- Subphylum: Chelicerata
- Class: Arachnida
- Order: Araneae
- Infraorder: Araneomorphae
- Family: Thomisidae
- Genus: Tmarus; Simon, 1875

Type species
- Aranea pigra Walckenaer, 1802

Diversity
- > 230 species

= Tmarus =

Genus of spiders

Tmarus is a genus of crab spiders in the family Thomisidae. The genus was established by Eugène Simon in 1875, with Tmarus piger (Walckenaer, 1802) as the type species.

The genus includes more than 230 described species distributed across all continents except Antarctica.

== Taxonomy ==
The genus Tmarus has undergone several taxonomic revisions. The generic name Martus Mello-Leitão, 1943 was considered a nomen nudum and synonymized with Tmarus. Additionally, Peritraeus Simon, 1895 was found to be a junior synonym of Tmarus.

== Description ==
Tmarus spiders are small to moderate-sized crab spiders with body lengths ranging from 3.7 to 7.3 millimeters. Females are typically larger than males, with males being slightly smaller in size. The spiders display cryptic coloration ranging from cream to dull grey, often mottled with cream, brown or black patterns that resemble bark, providing excellent camouflage.

The cephalothorax is as wide as long and rather convex, declining abruptly towards the posterior border. The clypeus is porrect (projecting forward), and the ocular area is well elevated. The lateral eyes are situated on well-defined tubercles, with both eye rows appearing almost straight or only slightly recurved. The lateral eyes are larger than the median eyes, while the anterior median eyes are the smallest.

The opisthosoma often features a posterior tubercle dorsally, though some species may have an elongated body form. The abdomen is clothed with numerous short, stiff setae, which are sometimes situated on small tubercles. The legs are spinous, with legs I and II being almost the same length and longer than legs III and IV. In Tmarus species, the posterior median eyes (PME) are situated nearer to each other than to the posterior lateral eyes (PLE), which distinguishes them from the closely related genus Monaeses.

== Distribution and habitat ==
Tmarus species are found worldwide, with the highest diversity in tropical and subtropical regions. They typically inhabit vegetation, where they hunt by ambush rather than building webs. Many species are found on bark or leaves, where their cryptic coloration provides camouflage.

== Species ==
As of September 2025, this genus includes 230 species and two subspecies.

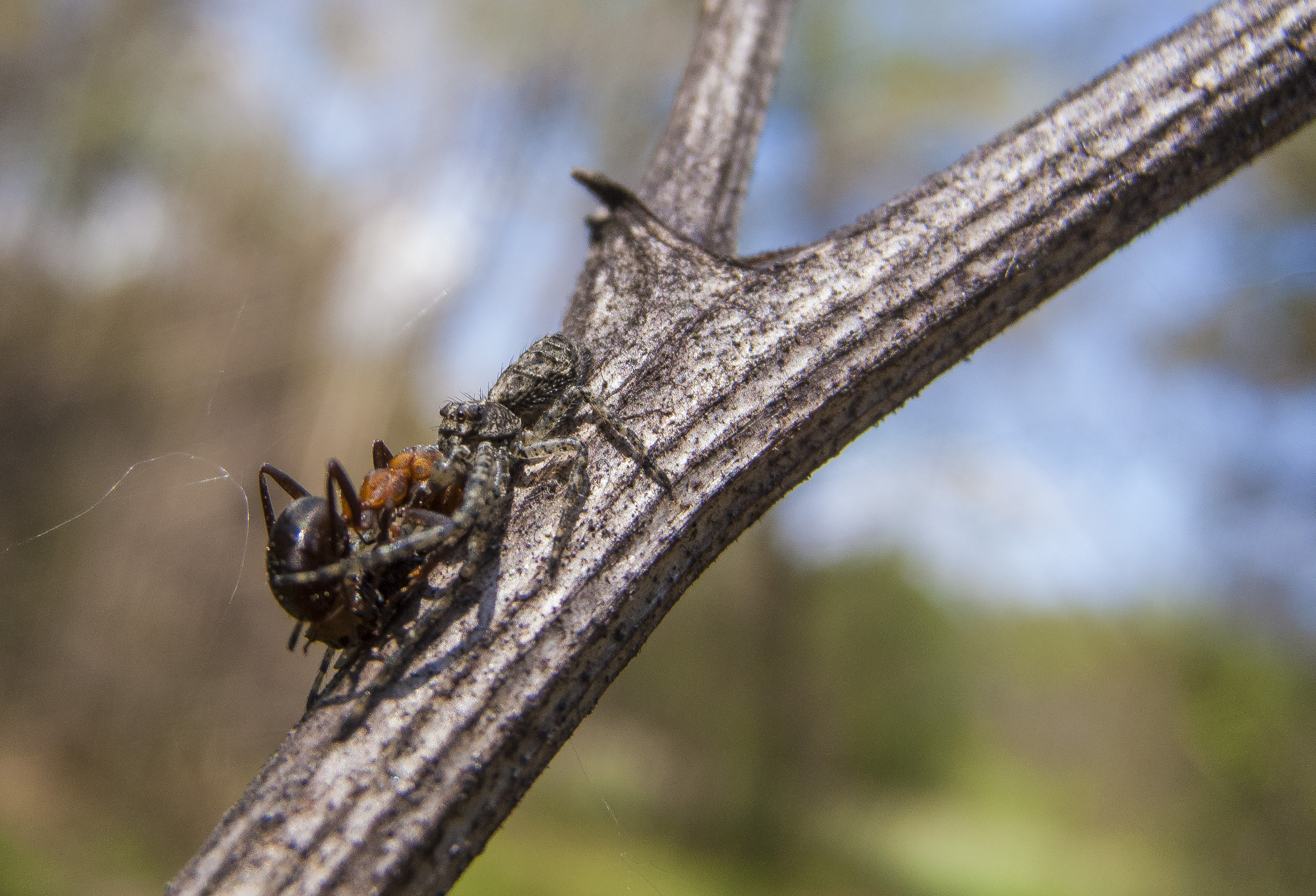
T. stellio from Ukraine

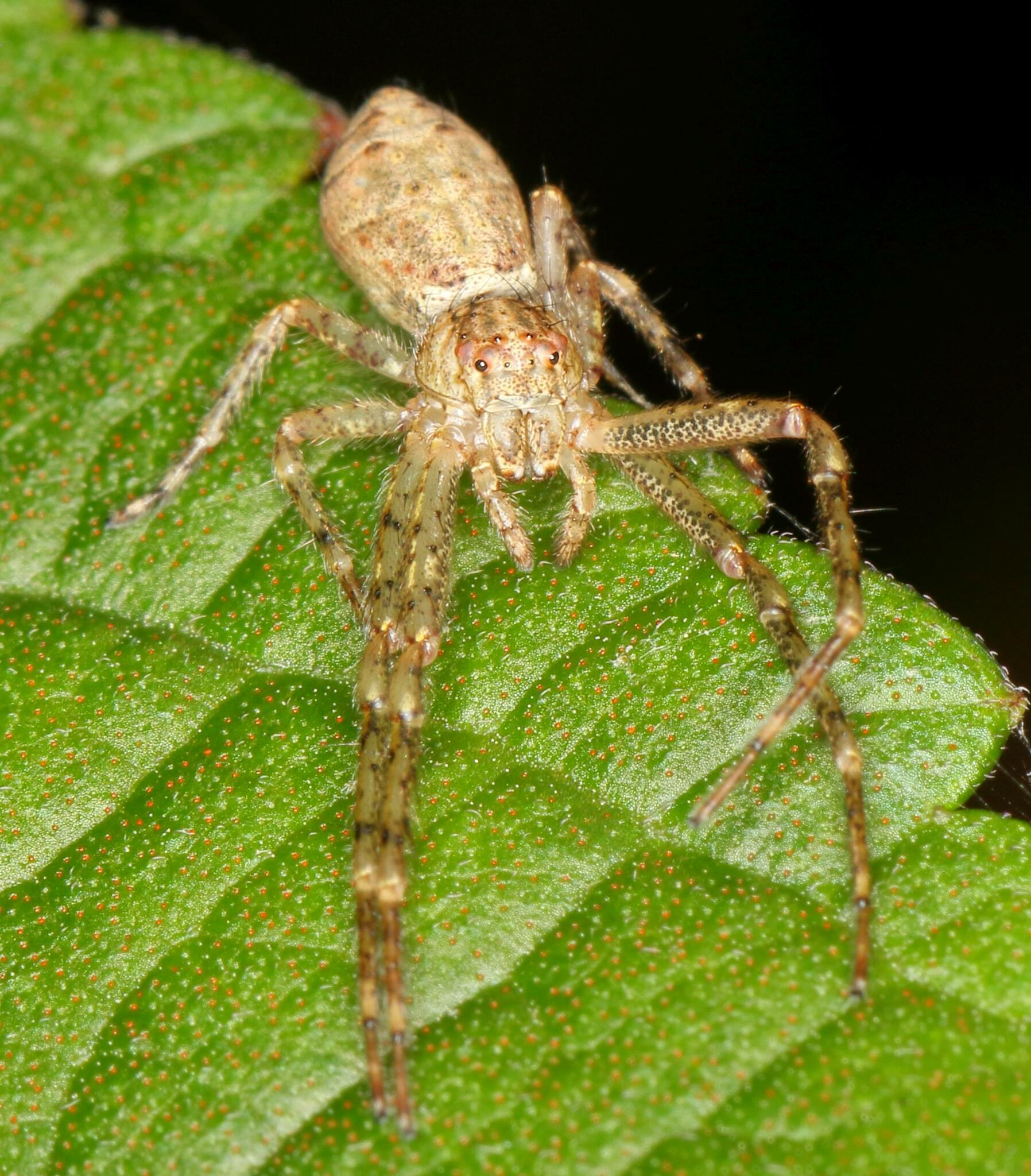
T. cameliformis from South Africa

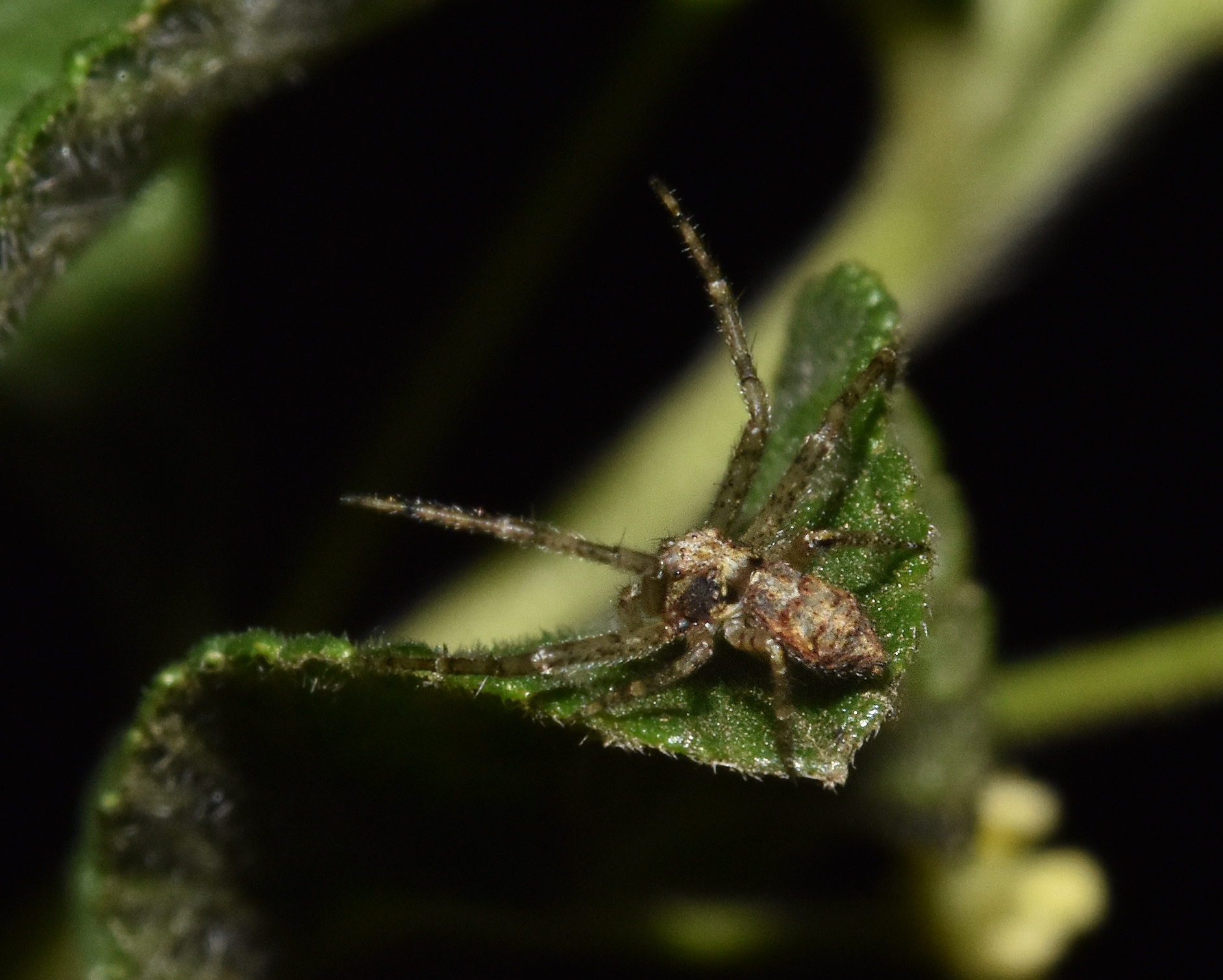
T. comellinii from South Africa

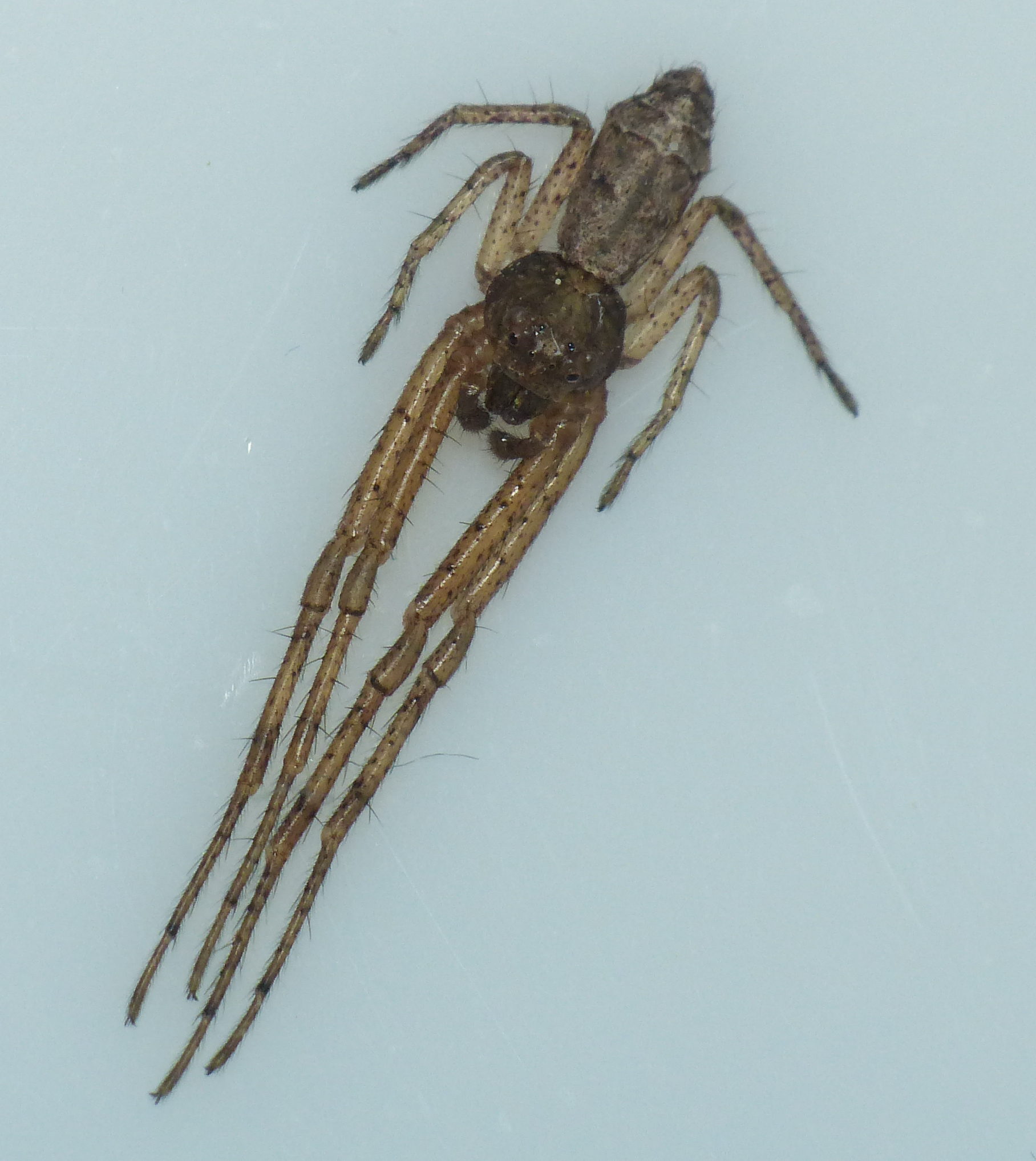
T. angulatus from North America

These species have articles on Wikipedia:

- Tmarus africanus Lessert, 1919 – Tanzania, Botswana, South Africa
- Tmarus angulatus (Walckenaer, 1837) – North America
- Tmarus cameliformis Millot, 1942 – Ghana, Guinea, DR Congo, Tanzania, Malawi, Botswana, South Africa, Eswatini
- Tmarus cancellatus Thorell, 1899 – Ivory Coast, Gabon, Nigeria, Cameroon, Rep. Congo, Equatorial Guinea (Bioko), Zimbabwe, South Africa
- Tmarus comellinii Garcia-Neto, 1989 – Congo to South Africa
- Tmarus floridensis Keyserling, 1884 – United States
- Tmarus foliatus Lessert, 1928 – Senegal, Ivory Coast, DR Congo, Burundi, Tanzania, Zimbabwe, South Africa, Lesotho, Comoros
- Tmarus guineensis Millot, 1942 – Guinea, South Africa
- Tmarus hystrix (Simon, 1895) – India, Sri Lanka
- Tmarus longicaudatus Millot, 1942 – Mauritania, Niger, Namibia, South Africa, Yemen, Saudi Arabia, United Arab Emirates
- Tmarus minutus Banks, 1904 – United States
- Tmarus natalensis Lessert, 1925 – South Africa
- Tmarus piger (Walckenaer, 1802) – Europe, Turkey, Caucasus, Russia (Europe to Far East), Kazakhstan, China, Korea, Japan (type species)
- Tmarus planetarius Simon, 1903 – Guinea Bissau, Sierra Leone, Ivory Coast, Nigeria, Cameroon, DR Congo, Kenya, Malawi, South Africa

Complete list of species as of October 2025
- Tmarus aberrans Mello-Leitão, 1944 – Brazil
- Tmarus aculeatus Chickering, 1950 – Panama
- Tmarus africanus Lessert, 1919 – Tanzania, Botswana, South Africa
- Tmarus albidus (L. Koch, 1876) – Australia (Queensland)
- Tmarus albifrons Piza, 1944 – Brazil
- Tmarus albisterni Mello-Leitão, 1942 – Argentina
- Tmarus albolineatus Keyserling, 1880 – Brazil
- Tmarus alticola Mello-Leitão, 1929 – Brazil
- Tmarus amazonicus Mello-Leitão, 1929 – Brazil
- Tmarus ampullatus Soares, 1943 – Brazil
- Tmarus angulatus (Walckenaer, 1837) – North America
- Tmarus angulifer Simon, 1895 – Australia (Queensland)
- Tmarus aporus Soares & Camargo, 1948 – Brazil
- Tmarus atypicus Mello-Leitão, 1929 – Brazil
- Tmarus australis Mello-Leitão, 1941 – Argentina
- Tmarus baptistai Silva-Moreira, 2010 – Brazil
- Tmarus bedoti Lessert, 1928 – DR Congo
- Tmarus berlandi Lessert, 1928 – DR Congo
- Tmarus bifasciatus Mello-Leitão, 1929 – Peru, Brazil
- Tmarus bifidipalpus Mello-Leitão, 1943 – Brazil
- Tmarus biocellatus Mello-Leitão, 1929 – Brazil
- Tmarus bisectus Piza, 1944 – Brazil
- Tmarus borgmeyeri Mello-Leitão, 1929 – Brazil
- Tmarus bucculentus Chickering, 1950 – Panama
- Tmarus byssinus Tang & Li, 2009 – China
- Tmarus caeruleus Keyserling, 1880 – Brazil
- Tmarus cameliformis Millot, 1942 – Ghana, Guinea, DR Congo, Tanzania, Malawi, Botswana, South Africa, Eswatini
- Tmarus camellinus Mello-Leitão, 1929 – Brazil
- Tmarus cancellatus Thorell, 1899 – Ivory Coast, Gabon, Nigeria, Cameroon, Rep. Congo, Equatorial Guinea (Bioko), Zimbabwe, South Africa
  - T. c. congoensis Comellini, 1955 – DR Congo
- Tmarus candefactus Caporiacco, 1954 – French Guiana
- Tmarus candidissimus Mello-Leitão, 1947 – Brazil
- Tmarus caporiaccoi Comellini, 1955 – DR Congo
- Tmarus caretta Mello-Leitão, 1929 – Brazil
- Tmarus caxambuensis Mello-Leitão, 1929 – Brazil
- Tmarus cinerasceus (L. Koch, 1876) – Australia (Queensland)
- Tmarus cinereus Mello-Leitão, 1929 – Brazil, Guyana
- Tmarus circinalis Song & Chai, 1990 – China
- Tmarus clarus (Mello-Leitão, 1937) – Brazil
- Tmarus clavimanus Mello-Leitão, 1929 – Brazil
- Tmarus clavipes Keyserling, 1891 – Brazil
- Tmarus cognatus Chickering, 1950 – Panama
- Tmarus comellinii Garcia-Neto, 1989 – Congo to South Africa
- Tmarus contortus Chickering, 1950 – Panama
- Tmarus corruptus O. Pickard-Cambridge, 1892 – Mexico, Panama
- Tmarus craneae Chickering, 1966 – Trinidad
- Tmarus cretatus Chickering, 1965 – Panama
- Tmarus curvus Chickering, 1950 – Panama
- Tmarus decens O. Pickard-Cambridge, 1892 – Panama
- Tmarus decoloratus Keyserling, 1883 – Peru
- Tmarus decorus Chickering, 1965 – Panama
- Tmarus dejectus (O. Pickard-Cambridge, 1885) – India
- Tmarus digitatus Mello-Leitão, 1929 – Brazil
- Tmarus digitiformis Yang, Zhu & Song, 2005 – China
- Tmarus dostinikus Barrion & Litsinger, 1995 – Philippines
- Tmarus ehecatltocatl Jiménez, 1992 – Mexico
- Tmarus elongatus Mello-Leitão, 1929 – Brazil
- Tmarus eques Thorell, 1890 – Indonesia (Java)
- Tmarus espiritosantensis B. A. M. Soares & H. E. M. Soares, 1946 – Brazil
- Tmarus estylifer Mello-Leitão, 1929 – Brazil
- Tmarus fallax Mello-Leitão, 1929 – Brazil, Guyana
- Tmarus fanjing Yang & Yu, 2022 – China
- Tmarus farri Chickering, 1966 – Jamaica
- Tmarus fasciolatus Simon, 1906 – India
- Tmarus femellus Caporiacco, 1941 – Ethiopia
- Tmarus floridensis Keyserling, 1884 – United States
- Tmarus foliatus Lessert, 1928 – Senegal, Ivory Coast, DR Congo, Burundi, Tanzania, Zimbabwe, South Africa, Lesotho, Comoros
- Tmarus formosus Mello-Leitão, 1917 – Brazil
- Tmarus gajdosi Marusik & Logunov, 2002 – Mongolia
- Tmarus galapagosensis Baert, 2013 – Galapagos
- Tmarus geayi Caporiacco, 1954 – French Guiana
- Tmarus gladiatus Tang & Li, 2010 – China
- Tmarus grandis Mello-Leitão, 1929 – Brazil
- Tmarus guineensis Millot, 1942 – Guinea, South Africa
- Tmarus hastatus Tang & Li, 2009 – China
- Tmarus hazevensis Levy, 1973 – Israel
- Tmarus hirsutus Mello-Leitão, 1929 – Brazil
- Tmarus histrix Caporiacco, 1954 – French Guiana
- Tmarus hiyarensis Ileperuma Arachchi & Benjamin, 2019 – Sri Lanka
- Tmarus holmbergi Schiapelli & Gerschman, 1941 – Argentina
- Tmarus homanni Chrysanthus, 1964 – Indonesia (New Guinea)
- Tmarus humphreyi Chickering, 1965 – Panama
- Tmarus hystrix (Simon, 1895) – India, Sri Lanka
- Tmarus impedus Chickering, 1965 – Panama
- Tmarus incertus Keyserling, 1880 – Colombia
- Tmarus incognitus Mello-Leitão, 1929 – Brazil
- Tmarus ineptus O. Pickard-Cambridge, 1892 – Panama, Colombia, Bonaire
- Tmarus infrasigillatus Mello-Leitão, 1947 – Brazil
- Tmarus innotus Chickering, 1965 – Panama
- Tmarus innumus Chickering, 1965 – Panama
- Tmarus insuetus Chickering, 1966 – Trinidad
- Tmarus intentus O. Pickard-Cambridge, 1892 – Guatemala, Panama
- Tmarus interritus Keyserling, 1880 – Panama, Brazil
- Tmarus jabalpurensis Gajbe & Gajbe, 1999 – India
- Tmarus jelskii (Taczanowski, 1872) – French Guiana
- Tmarus jocosus O. Pickard-Cambridge, 1898 – Costa Rica
- Tmarus karolae Jézéquel, 1964 – Ivory Coast
- Tmarus komi Ono, 1996 – Japan (Ryukyu Is.)
- Tmarus koreanus Paik, 1973 – China, Korea
- Tmarus kotigeharus Tikader, 1963 – India
- Tmarus lanyu Zhang, Zhu & Tso, 2006 – Taiwan
- Tmarus lapadui Jézéquel, 1964 – Ivory Coast
- Tmarus latifrons Thorell, 1895 – Myanmar, Indonesia (Krakatau)
- Tmarus lawrencei Comellini, 1955 – DR Congo
- Tmarus levii Chickering, 1965 – Panama
- Tmarus lichenoides Mello-Leitão, 1929 – Brazil
- Tmarus littoralis Keyserling, 1880 – Brazil
- Tmarus locketi Millot, 1942 – Guinea, DR Congo
  - T. l. djuguensis Comellini, 1955 – DR Congo
- Tmarus longicaudatus Millot, 1942 – Mauritania, Niger, Namibia, South Africa, Yemen, Saudi Arabia, United Arab Emirates
- Tmarus longipes Caporiacco, 1947 – Tanzania
- Tmarus longqicus Song & Zhu, 1993 – China
- Tmarus longus Chickering, 1965 – Panama
- Tmarus loriae Thorell, 1890 – Malaysia
- Tmarus macilentus (L. Koch, 1876) – Australia (Queensland)
- Tmarus maculosus Keyserling, 1880 – Colombia
- Tmarus makiharai Ono, 1988 – Japan (Ryukyu Is.)
- Tmarus malleti Lessert, 1919 – Guinea, DR Congo, Tanzania
- Tmarus manojkaushalyai Ileperuma Arachchi & Benjamin, 2019 – Sri Lanka
- Tmarus marmoreus (L. Koch, 1876) – Australia (Queensland)
- Tmarus menglae Song & Zhao, 1994 – China
- Tmarus menotus Chickering, 1966 – Jamaica
- Tmarus metropolitanus Mello-Leitão, 1929 – Brazil
- Tmarus milloti Comellini, 1955 – Cameroon, DR Congo
- Tmarus minensis Mello-Leitão, 1929 – Brazil
- Tmarus minutus Banks, 1904 – United States
- Tmarus misumenoides Mello-Leitão, 1927 – Brazil
- Tmarus montericensis Keyserling, 1880 – Peru
- Tmarus morosus Chickering, 1950 – Panama, Colombia
- Tmarus mourei Mello-Leitão, 1947 – Brazil
- Tmarus mundulus O. Pickard-Cambridge, 1892 – Panama
- Tmarus mutabilis Soares, 1944 – Brazil
- Tmarus natalensis Lessert, 1925 – South Africa
- Tmarus neocaledonicus Kritscher, 1966 – New Caledonia
- Tmarus nigrescens Mello-Leitão, 1929 – Brazil
- Tmarus nigridorsi Mello-Leitão, 1929 – Brazil
- Tmarus nigristernus Caporiacco, 1947 – Uganda
- Tmarus nigrofasciatus Mello-Leitão, 1929 – Brazil
- Tmarus nigroviridis Mello-Leitão, 1929 – Brazil
- Tmarus ningshaanensis Wang & Xi, 1998 – China
- Tmarus obesus Mello-Leitão, 1929 – Brazil, French Guiana
- Tmarus oblectator Logunov, 1992 – Russia (Far East)
- Tmarus obsecus Chickering, 1965 – Panama
- Tmarus okinawanus Tanikawa, 2024 – Japan (Ryukyu Is.)
- Tmarus orientalis Schenkel, 1963 – China, Korea
- Tmarus pallidus Mello-Leitão, 1929 – Brazil
- Tmarus parallelus Mello-Leitão, 1943 – Brazil
- Tmarus parki Chickering, 1950 – Panama
- Tmarus paulensis Piza, 1935 – Brazil
- Tmarus pauper O. Pickard-Cambridge, 1892 – Panama
- Tmarus perditus Mello-Leitão, 1929 – Brazil
- Tmarus peregrinus Chickering, 1950 – Panama
- Tmarus peruvianus Berland, 1913 – Peru
- Tmarus piger (Walckenaer, 1802) – Europe, Turkey, Caucasus, Russia (Europe to Far East), Kazakhstan, China, Korea, Japan (type species)
- Tmarus piochardi (Simon, 1866) – Mediterranean, Turkey, Georgia, Iran
- Tmarus pizai Soares, 1941 – Brazil
- Tmarus planetarius Simon, 1903 – Guinea Bissau, Sierra Leone, Ivory Coast, Nigeria, Cameroon, DR Congo, Kenya, Malawi, South Africa
- Tmarus planifrons Mello-Leitão, 1943 – Brazil
- Tmarus planquettei Jézéquel, 1966 – Ivory Coast
- Tmarus pleuronotatus Mello-Leitão, 1941 – Brazil
- Tmarus plurituberculatus Mello-Leitão, 1929 – Brazil
- Tmarus polyandrus Mello-Leitão, 1929 – Brazil
- Tmarus posticatus Simon, 1929 – Brazil
- Tmarus primitivus Mello-Leitão, 1929 – Brazil
- Tmarus probus Chickering, 1950 – Panama
- Tmarus productus Chickering, 1950 – Panama
- Tmarus prognathus Simon, 1929 – Brazil
- Tmarus projectus (L. Koch, 1876) – Australia (Queensland)
- Tmarus protobius Chickering, 1965 – Panama
- Tmarus pugnax Mello-Leitão, 1929 – Brazil
- Tmarus pulchripes Thorell, 1895 – Singapore
- Tmarus punctatissimus (Simon, 1870) – Portugal, Spain, France, Caucasus, Russia (Europe to Far East), Iran, Turkmenistan, Korea, Japan
- Tmarus punctatus (Nicolet, 1849) – Chile
- Tmarus qinlingensis Song & Wang, 1994 – China
- Tmarus rainbowi Mello-Leitão, 1929 – Australia (South Australia)
- Tmarus rarus B. A. M. Soares & H. E. M. Soares, 1946 – Brazil
- Tmarus riccii Caporiacco, 1941 – Ethiopia
- Tmarus rimosus Paik, 1973 – Russia (Urals to Far East), China, Korea, Japan
- Tmarus rostratus Y. C. Zhou, Qin, G. C. Zhou, Peng & Liu, 2025 – China
- Tmarus rubinus Chickering, 1965 – Panama
- Tmarus rubromaculatus Keyserling, 1880 – United States
- Tmarus salai Schick, 1965 – United States
- Tmarus schoutedeni Comellini, 1955 – DR Congo
- Tmarus scopullitus Liu & Zhang, 2025 – China
- Tmarus semiroseus Simon, 1909 – Vietnam
- Tmarus separatus Banks, 1898 – Panama
- Tmarus serratus Yang, Zhu & Song, 2005 – China
- Tmarus shimojanai Ono, 1997 – Japan (Ryukyu Is.)
- Tmarus sigillatus Chickering, 1950 – Panama
- Tmarus simoni Comellini, 1955 – Sierra Leone
- Tmarus songi Han & Zhu, 2009 – China
- Tmarus soricinus Simon, 1906 – India
- Tmarus spicatus Tang & Li, 2009 – China
- Tmarus spinosus Comellini, 1955 – DR Congo
- Tmarus staintoni (O. Pickard-Cambridge, 1873) – Spain, France, Italy, Morocco, Algeria
- Tmarus stellio Simon, 1875 – Southern, Central and Eastern Europe, Turkey, Caucasus, Iran
- Tmarus stolzmanni Keyserling, 1880 – Peru
- Tmarus striolatus Mello-Leitão, 1943 – Brazil
- Tmarus studiosus O. Pickard-Cambridge, 1892 – Panama
- Tmarus subqinlingensis R. Zhang & F. Zhang, 2023 – China
- Tmarus taibaiensis Song & Wang, 1994 – China
- Tmarus taishanensis Zhu & Wen, 1981 – Russia (South Siberia), China
- Tmarus taiwanus Ono, 1977 – China, Taiwan
- Tmarus tamazolinus Jiménez, 1988 – Mexico
- Tmarus thorelli Comellini, 1955 – DR Congo
- Tmarus tinctus Keyserling, 1880 – Peru
- Tmarus tonkinus Simon, 1909 – Vietnam
- Tmarus toschii Caporiacco, 1949 – Kenya
- Tmarus trifidus Mello-Leitão, 1929 – Brazil
- Tmarus trituberculatus Mello-Leitão, 1929 – Brazil
- Tmarus truncatus (L. Koch, 1876) – Australia (Queensland)
- Tmarus tuberculitibiis Caporiacco, 1940 – Ethiopia
- Tmarus undatus Tang & Li, 2009 – China
- Tmarus ungulatus Chen, Liu & Hu, 2025 – China
- Tmarus unicus Gertsch, 1936 – United States
- Tmarus vachoni Millot, 1942 – Ivory Coast
- Tmarus variabilis (L. Koch, 1876) – Australia (Queensland)
- Tmarus variatus Keyserling, 1891 – Brazil
- Tmarus verrucosus Mello-Leitão, 1948 – Guyana
- Tmarus vertumus Chickering, 1966 – Puerto Rico
- Tmarus vexillifer (Butler, 1876) – Mauritius (Rodriguez)
- Tmarus villasboasi Mello-Leitão, 1949 – Brazil
- Tmarus viridis Keyserling, 1880 – Peru, Brazil
- Tmarus viridomaculatus Ileperuma Arachchi & Benjamin, 2019 – Sri Lanka
- Tmarus vitusus Chickering, 1965 – Mexico, Panama
- Tmarus wiedenmeyeri Schenkel, 1953 – Venezuela
- Tmarus yaginumai Ono, 1977 – Korea, Japan
- Tmarus yani Yin, Peng, Gong & Kim, 2004 – China
- Tmarus yerohamus Levy, 1973 – Israel
- Tmarus yiminhensis Zhu & Wen, 1981 – China
- Tmarus yueluensis Y. C. Zhou, Qin, G. C. Zhou, Peng & Liu, 2025 – China
- Tmarus zhui Sherwood & Li, 2021 – China
