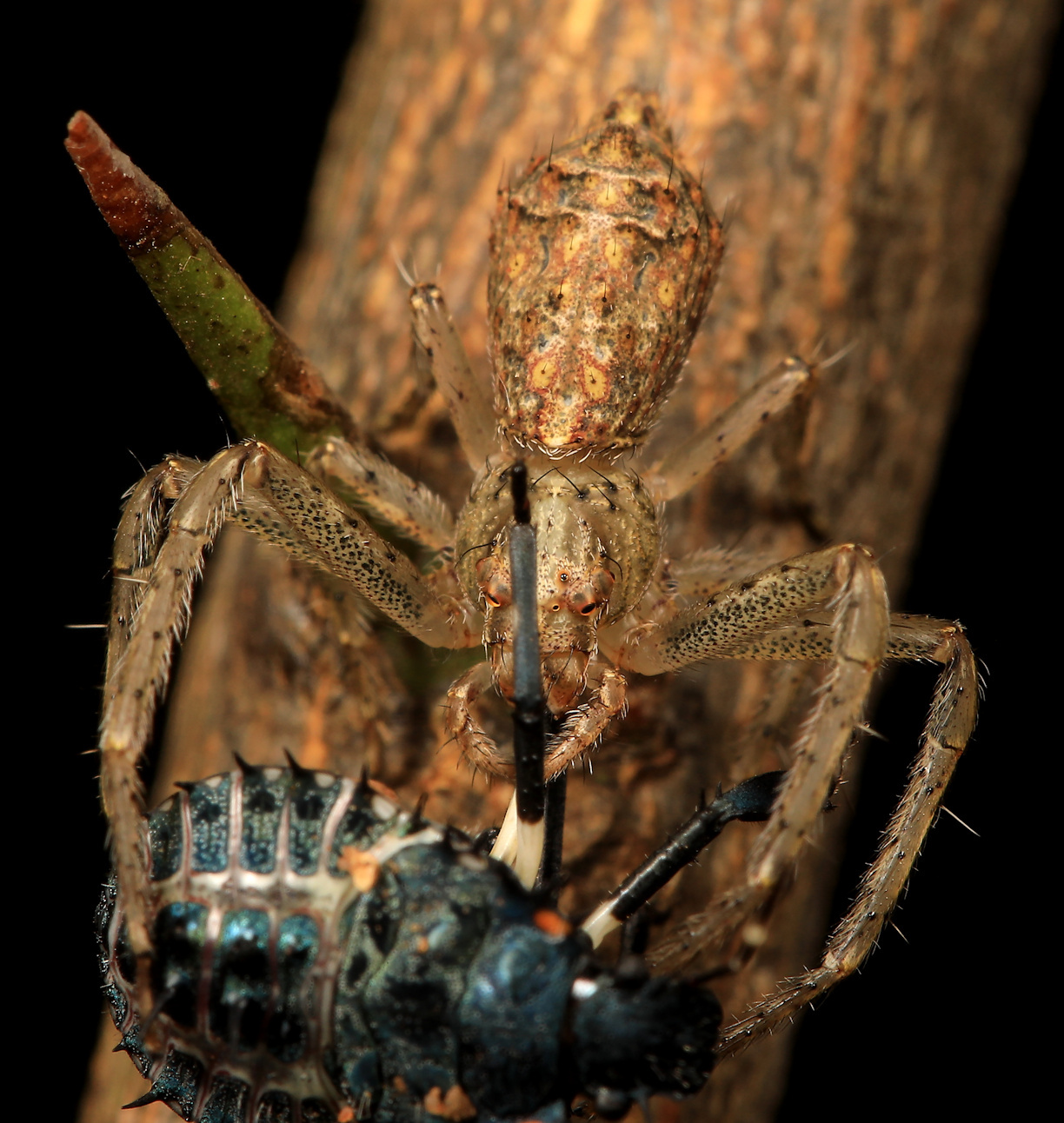
- from South Africa
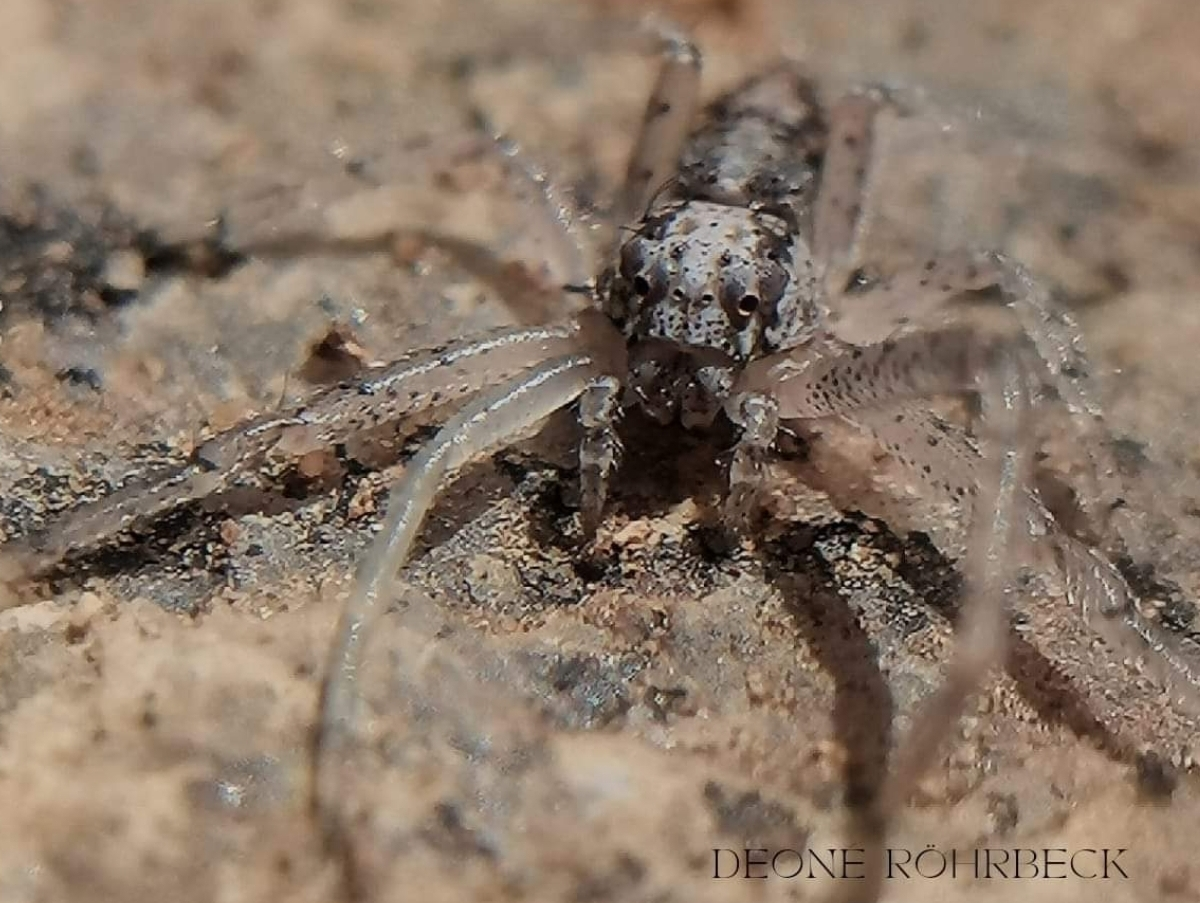

Scientific classification
- Kingdom: Animalia
- Phylum: Arthropoda
- Subphylum: Chelicerata
- Class: Arachnida
- Order: Araneae
- Infraorder: Araneomorphae
- Family: Thomisidae
- Genus: Tmarus
- Species: T. africanus

Binomial name
- Tmarus africanus Lessert, 1919

= Tmarus africanus =

Long bodied Tmarus crab spider

Species of spider

Tmarus africanus is a species of crab spider in the family Thomisidae. It is found in Tanzania, Botswana, and South Africa.

== Distribution ==
Tmarus africanus is distributed across eastern and southern Africa, with confirmed records from Tanzania, Botswana, and South Africa. In South Africa, it has been recorded from eight provinces including the Eastern Cape, Gauteng, KwaZulu-Natal, Limpopo, Mpumalanga, North West, Northern Cape, and Western Cape.

== Habitat ==
Tmarus africanus is a free-living species that inhabits plants, primarily trees. The species has been collected from the Grassland, Indian Ocean Coastal Belt, Savanna, and Thicket biomes. Specific host plants include Combretum molle and Dombeya rotundifolia trees in the Savanna biome.

== Behavior and ecology ==
Tmarus africanus is a hunting spider that does not build webs but instead ambushes prey on vegetation. Males have been collected during November and December, while females are active in March, suggesting seasonal reproductive activity.

== Description ==
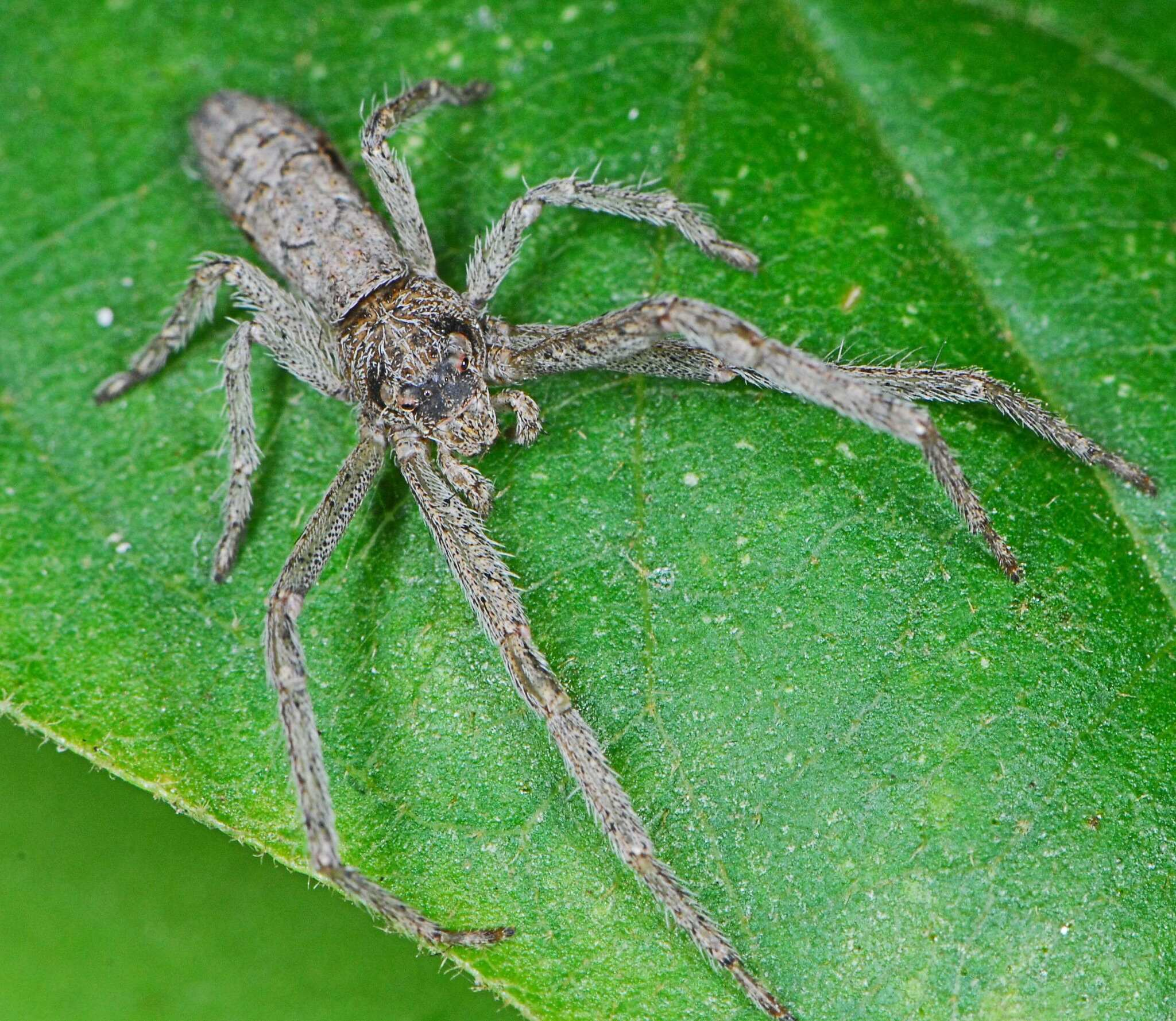
female

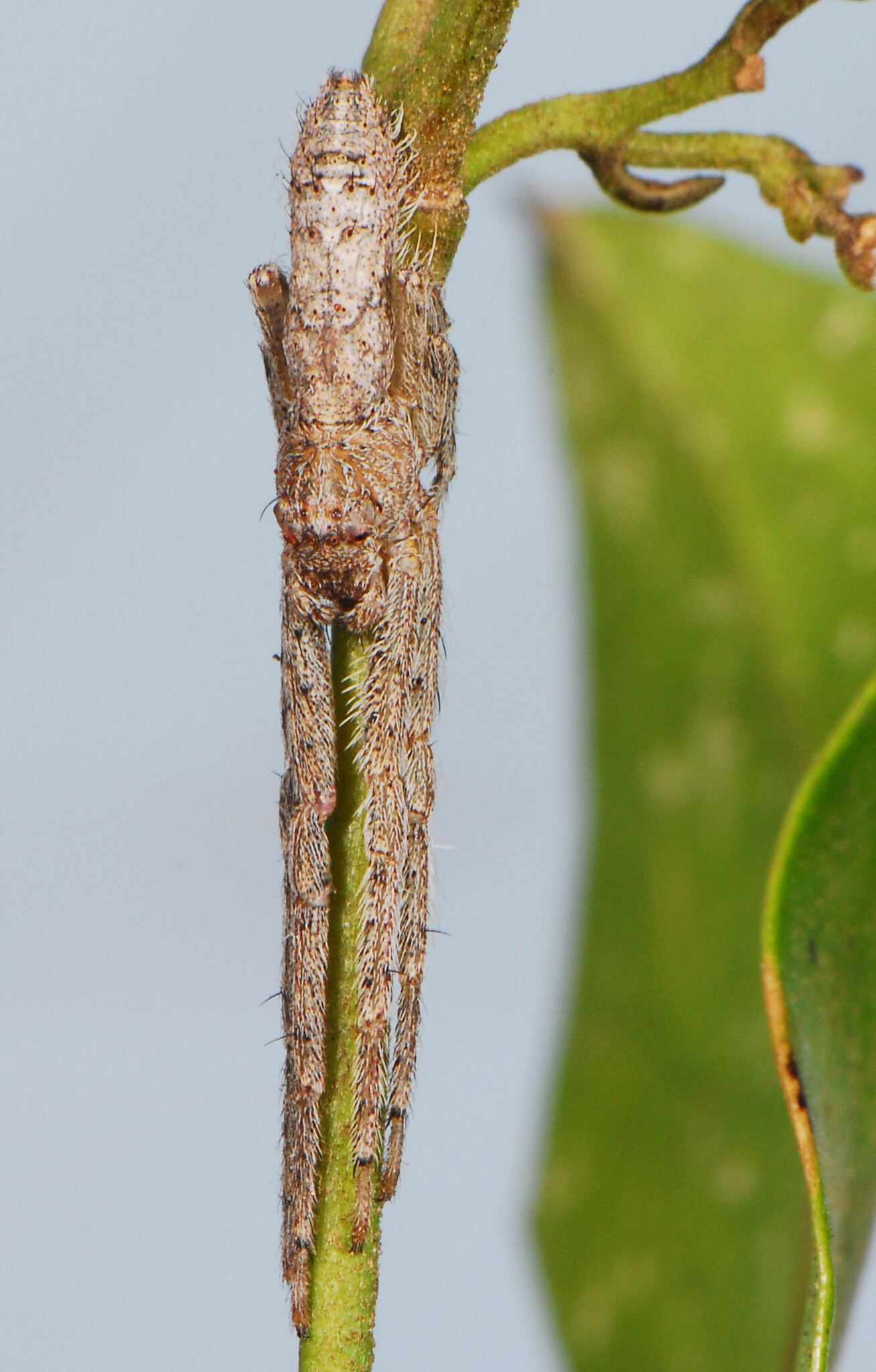
female

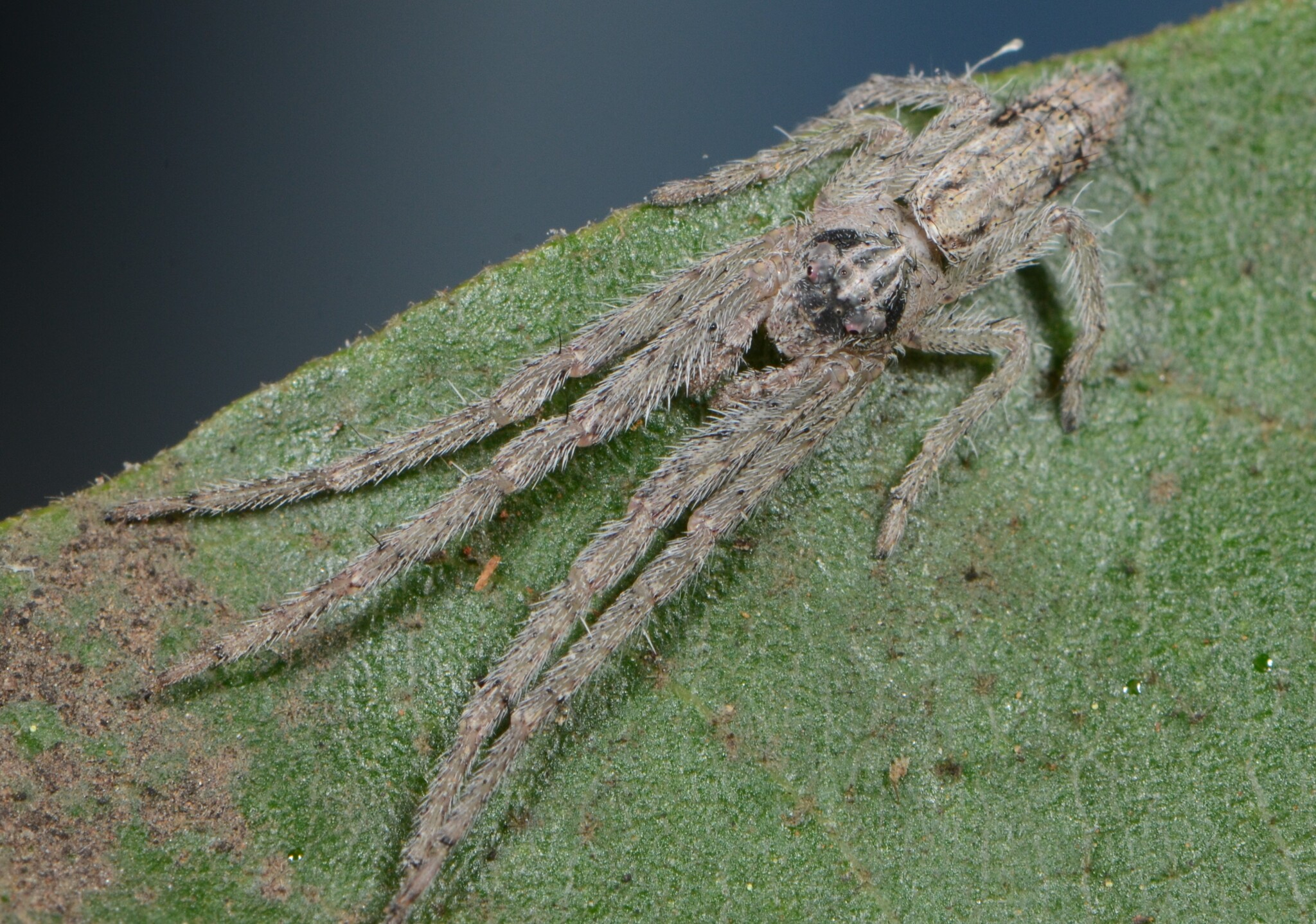
female

The species exhibits sexual dimorphism typical of crab spiders, with females being larger than males.

=== Female ===
Females have a total length of 7.3 mm, with a cephalothorax length of 2.5 mm and width of 2.0 mm. The clypeus height is 1.25 mm, with specific eye arrangements where the distance between posterior median eyes is 0.40 mm, posterior median to posterior lateral eyes is 0.54 mm, and posterior median to anterior median eyes is 0.28 mm.

The carapace coloration ranges from fawn to grey, mottled with black markings. The cephalic area displays distinctive ray-like dark lines, while the eye area appears white. The carapace sometimes features black mediolateral lines.

The opisthosoma is grey and mottled with black, occasionally showing two broad black lines laterally. Ventrally, it displays a broad black median line with fawn-colored legs that are spotted with black. The carapace is longer than wide with nearly parallel sides, and the clypeus slopes, with the anterior row of eyes being straight and the posterior row recurved.

=== Male ===
Males are considerably smaller, with a total length of 5.8 mm, cephalothorax length of 2.2 mm, and width of 1.9 mm. The male coloration is similar to females but generally darker, ranging from fawn to dark brown. The abdomen is dark brown with white ventral areas and a dark broad median line.

== Etymology ==
The species name africanus refers to its African distribution, with only two Tmarus species having been previously described from the African continent.

== Conservation status ==
The species is listed as Least Concern due to its wide geographical range across three African countries. It occurs in several protected areas including Kruger National Park, Makalali Game Reserve, and Polokwane Nature Reserve.
