= Cavanilla =

Cavanilla is a name that has been used four times, applied to four different groups of plants. None of the names is in common use today. Names are

- Cavanilla J.F.Gmel. 1792 (Dombeya or Pentapetes or Pterospermum or Trochetia in Malvaceae; impossible to equate with a modern genus because no type was ever designated)
- Cavanilla Thunb. 1792 (Pyrenacantha in Icacinaceae)
- Cavanilla Salisb. 1792 (Stewartia in Theaceae)
- Cavanilla Vell. 1829 (Caperonia in Euphorbiaceae)

Species assigned to these various generic names with their closest modern equivalents

- Cavanilla acerifolia (L.) J.F.Gmel. - Pterospermum acerifolium (L.) Willd.
- Cavanilla acutangula J.F.Gmel. - Dombeya acutangula Cav.
- Cavanilla angulata J.F.Gmel. - Dombeya acutangula Cav.
- Cavanilla florida Salisb. - Stewartia malacodendron L.
- Cavanilla palmata J.F.Gmel. - Dombeya acutangula Cav.
- Cavanilla phoenicea J.F.Gmel. - Pentapetes phoenicea L.
- Cavanilla tiliifolia J.F.Gmel. - Dombeya acutangula Cav.
