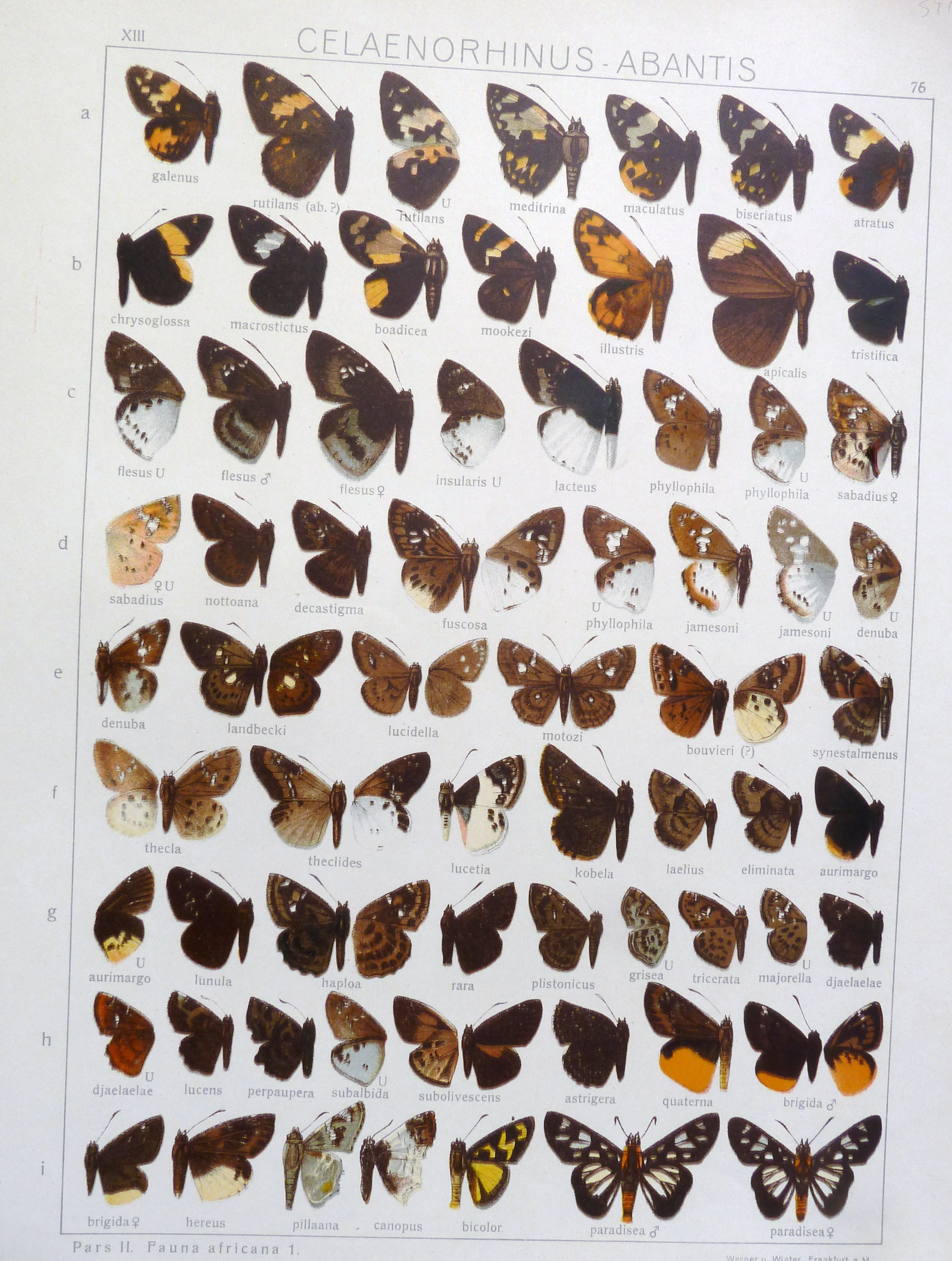

Scientific classification
- Domain: Eukaryota
- Kingdom: Animalia
- Phylum: Arthropoda
- Class: Insecta
- Order: Lepidoptera
- Family: Hesperiidae
- Genus: Abantis
- Species: A. pillaana

Binomial name
- Abantis pillaana (Wallengren, 1857)

Synonyms
- Stethotrix heterogyna Mabille, 1889; Caprona pillaana Wallengren, 1857

= Abantis pillaana =

Species of butterfly

Abantis pillaana, the ragged skipper, is a butterfly of the family Hesperiidae. It is found in South Africa, Zimbabwe, Botswana, from Mozambique to eastern Africa, Ethiopia and south-western Arabia.

The wingspan is 30–37 mm for males and 35–44 mm for females. Adults are on wing year-round, with peaks from September to November and from March to May in southern Africa.

The larvae feed on Grewia species (including Grewia flava and Grewia monticola), Dombeya species (including Dombeya rotundifolia and Dombeya burgessiae) and Sterculia quinqueloba.
