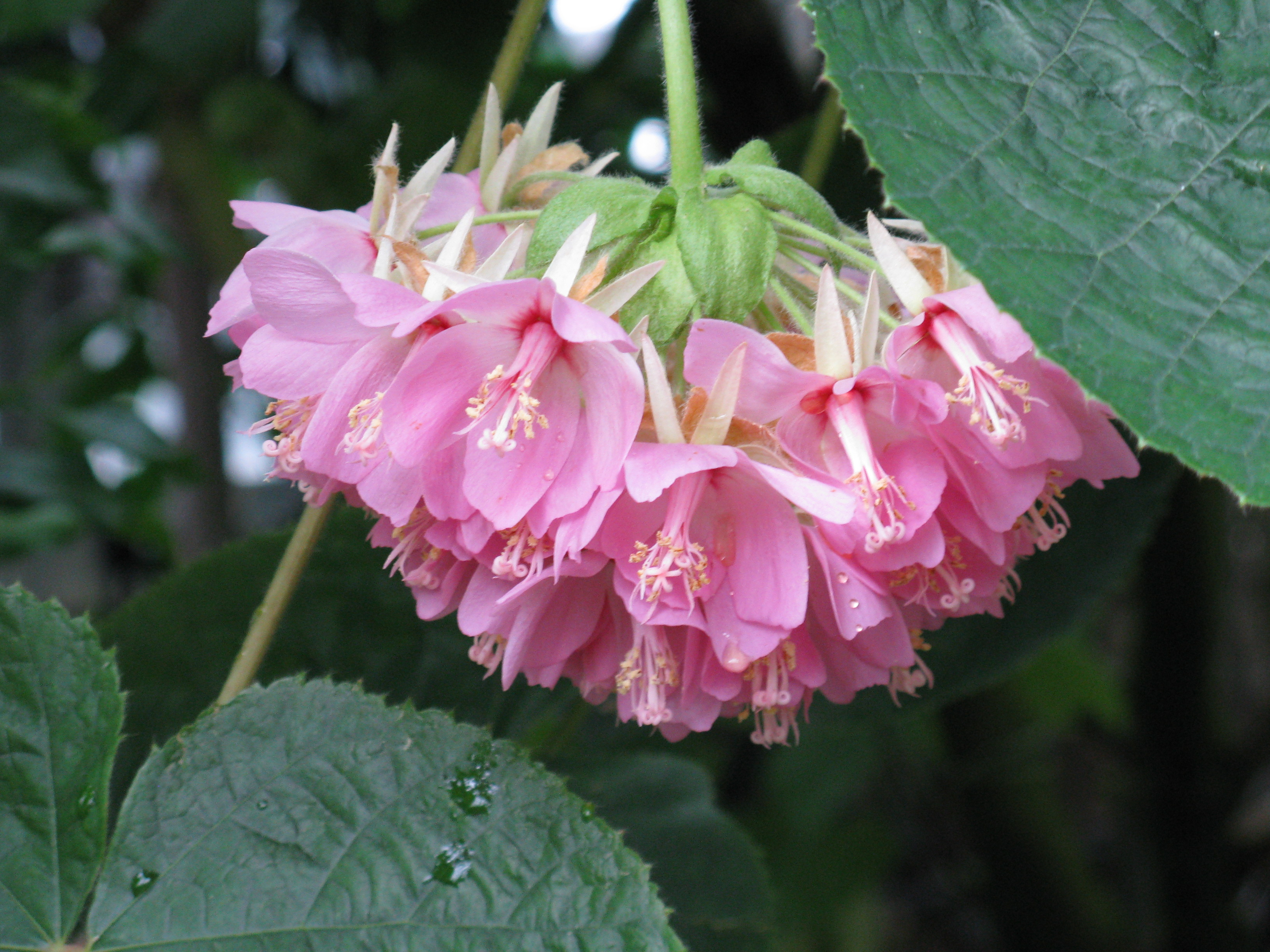
- Inflorescence

Scientific classification
- Kingdom: Plantae
- Clade: Tracheophytes
- Clade: Angiosperms
- Clade: Eudicots
- Clade: Rosids
- Order: Malvales
- Family: Malvaceae
- Genus: Dombeya
- Species: D. wallichii

Binomial name
- Dombeya wallichii (Lindl.) Benth. ex Baill. (1885)

Synonyms
- Assonia wallichii (Lindl.) Kuntze (1891); Astrapaea penduliflora DC. (1828); Astrapaea speciosa F.Dietr. (1825); Astrapaea wallichii Lindl. (1821); Dombeya penduliflora (DC.) M.Gómez (1890); Dombeya speciosa A.Dietr. ex Salomon (1880), nom. superfl.

= Dombeya wallichii =

Species of shrub

Dombeya wallichii is a flowering shrub of the family Malvaceae known by the common names pinkball, pink ball tree, and tropical hydrangea.

== Description ==
The plant can grow 15 to 30 feet (5 to 9 m) tall and has a spread of up to 25 ft (8 m). The alternately arranged leaves are heart-shaped with serrated edges. The hanging flower clusters are pink, showy, and fragrant.

== Range and habitat ==
It is native to eastern Madagascar. Its natural distribution isn't well understood, but wild specimens were collected from two coastal streamside locations on the eastern coast of Madagascar – at Antalaha on the northeastern coast, and at Mandena on the southeastern coast.

It has been introduced by humans to Cuba, the Dominican Republic, Marianas, Mauritius, southwestern Mexico, Réunion, Thailand, and the Windward Islands, where it has naturalized.

== Cultivation ==
Dombeya wallichii is grown widely as a garden plant.

This species can be crossed with Dombeya burgessiae to produce the hybrid Dombeya × cayeuxii.
