= Dombeya amaniensis =

Conservation status
- Vulnerable (IUCN 2.3)

Scientific classification
- Kingdom: Plantae
- Clade: Tracheophytes
- Clade: Angiosperms
- Clade: Eudicots
- Clade: Rosids
- Order: Malvales
- Family: Malvaceae
- Genus: Dombeya
- Species: D. amaniensis

Binomial name
- Dombeya amaniensis Engl.

Species of flowering plant

Dombeya amaniensis is a flowering plant species found only in Tanzania. Formerly placed in the family Sterculiaceae, this artificial assemblage is now included in the Malvaceae by most authors.

Its relationships are not well determined. It seems to belong to an ill-defined clade containing congeners from eastern Africa and the Madagascar region, such as D. tiliacea and several species from the Mascarenes. Among the latter, D. delislei, D. elegans and D. punctata might be somewhat closer to the present species than the "rainforest group" around D. ciliata.

Dombeya amaniensis is a rare tree of moist forest between 900 and 1,000 m ASL. It has hitherto only been found at Makuyuni, on the Mahenge Plateau, and in the East Usambara Mountains. This plant is endangered due to habitat loss.
