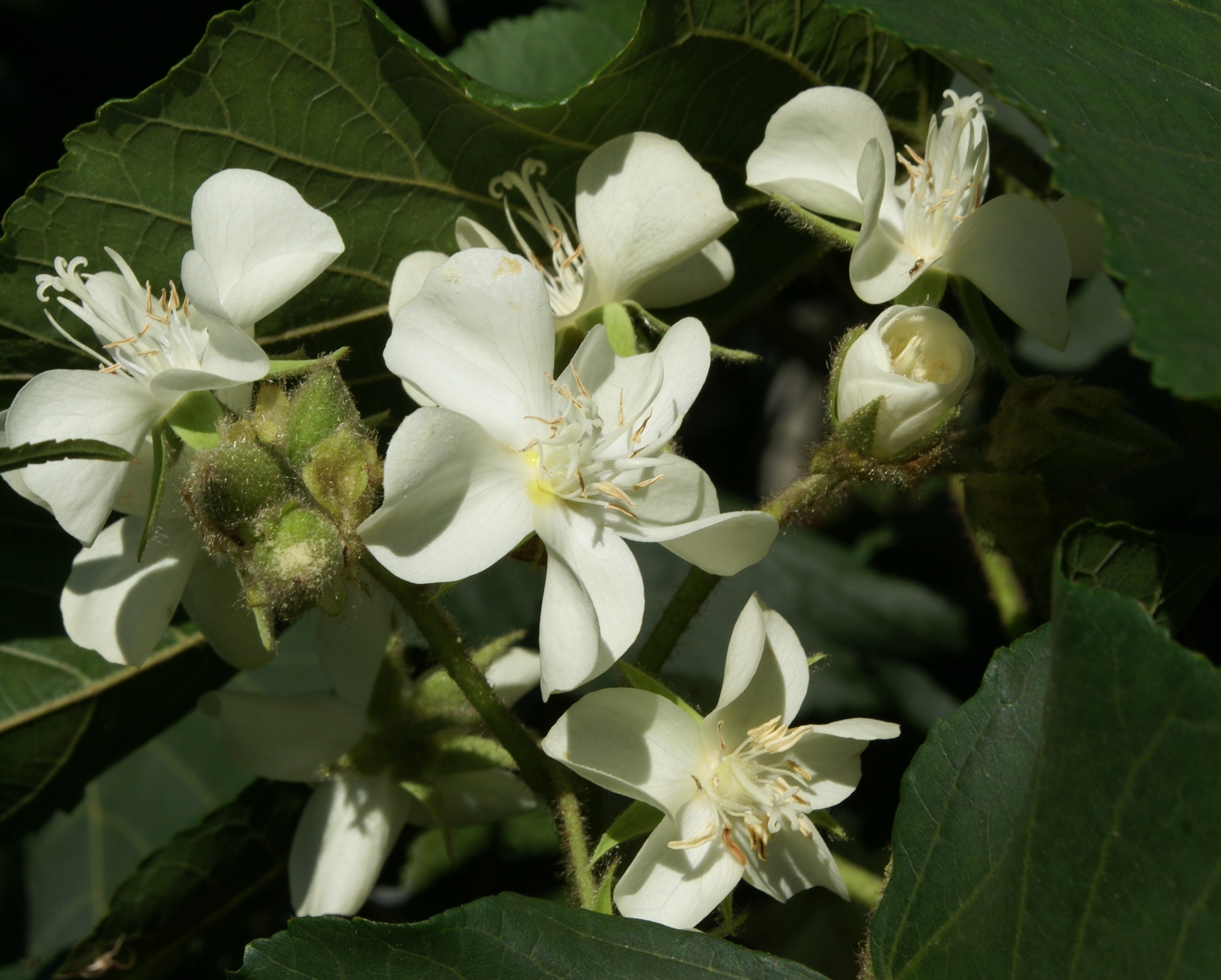

Conservation status
- Least Concern (IUCN 3.1)

Scientific classification
- Kingdom: Plantae
- Clade: Tracheophytes
- Clade: Angiosperms
- Clade: Eudicots
- Clade: Rosids
- Order: Malvales
- Family: Malvaceae
- Genus: Dombeya
- Species: D. acutangula

Binomial name
- Dombeya acutangula Cav. (1787)

Synonyms
- Synonymy: Assonia angulata (Cav.) Kuntze in Revis. Gen. Pl. 1: 76 (1891); Assonia botryoides (Baker) Kuntze in Revis. Gen. Pl. 1: 76 (1891); Assonia greveana (Baill.) Kuntze in Revis. Gen. Pl. 1: 76 (1891); Assonia palmata Kuntze in Revis. Gen. Pl. 1: 76 (1891); Assonia rubifolia (Baill.) Kuntze in Revis. Gen. Pl. 1: 76 (1891); Assonia stuhlmannii (K.Schum.) Kuntze in Deutsche Bot. Monatsschr. 21: 173 (1903); Assonia tiliifolia Kuntze in Revis. Gen. Pl. 1: 76 (1891); Assonia triumfettifolia (Bojer) Kuntze in Revis. Gen. Pl. 1: 76 (1891); Astrapaea tiliifolia (Cav.) Sweet in Hort. Brit.: 58 (1826); Cavanilla acutangula (Cav.) J.F.Gmel. (1792); Cavanilla angulata (Cav.) J.F.Gmel. in Syst. Nat., ed. 13[bis].: 1037 (1792); Cavanilla palmata J.F.Gmel. in Syst. Nat., ed. 13[bis].: 1037 (1792); Cavanilla tiliifolia J.F.Gmel. in Syst. Nat., ed. 13[bis].: 1037 (1792); Dombeya acutangula var. palmata (Cav.) Arènes in Mém. Inst. Sci. Madagascar, Sér. B, Biol. Vég. 9: 198 (1959); Dombeya acutangula subsp. rosea F.Friedmann in Adansonia, n.s., 20: 445 (1981); Dombeya acutangula var. tiliifolia (Cav.) Arènes in Mém. Inst. Sci. Madagascar, Sér. B, Biol. Vég. 9: 198 (1959); Dombeya angulata Cav. in Diss. 3: 123 (1787); Dombeya borraginopsis Hochr. in Candollea 3: 22 (1926); Dombeya botryoides Baker in J. Linn. Soc., Bot. 25: 298 (1889); Dombeya cincinnata K.Schum. in H.G.A.Engler (ed.), Pflanzenw. Ost-Afrikas, C: 271 (1895); Dombeya cincinnata var. stuhlmannii (K.Schum.) K.Schum. in H.G.A.Engler, Monogr. Afrik. Pflanzen-Fam. 5: 32 (1900); Dombeya cordifolia DC. in Prodr. 1: 499 (1824); Dombeya greveana Baill. in Bull. Mens. Soc. Linn. Paris 1: 492 (1885); Dombeya greveana var. metameropsis (Hochr.) Arènes in Candollea 16: 301 (1958); Dombeya leucorrhoea K.Schum. in Bot. Jahrb. Syst. 30: 353 (1901); Dombeya metameropsis Hochr. in Candollea 3: 22 (1926); Dombeya metameropsis var. belambanensis Hochr. in Candollea 3: 68 (1926); Dombeya metameropsis var. kitombaensis Hochr. in Candollea 3: 67 (1926); Dombeya metameropsis var. typica Hochr. in Candollea 3: 67 (1926), not validly publ.; Dombeya palmata Cav. in Diss. 3: 122 (1787); Dombeya palmatiformis Arènes in Mém. Inst. Sci. Madagascar, Sér. B, Biol. Vég. 9: 209 (1960); Dombeya quinquecostata Arènes in Candollea 16: 298 (1958); Dombeya rubifolia Baill. in Bull. Mens. Soc. Linn. Paris 1: 492 (1885); Dombeya stuhlmannii K.Schum. in Notizbl. Königl. Bot. Gart. Berlin 2: 302 (1899); Dombeya tiliifolia Cav. in Diss. 3: 124 (1787); Dombeya triumfettifolia Bojer in Ann. Sci. Nat., Bot., sér. 2, 18: 191 (1842); Dombeya urenoides Hochr. in Candollea 3: 21 (1926); Pentapetes acutangula (Cav.) Poir. (1804); Pentapetes angulosa Poir. in J.B.A.M.de Lamarck, Encycl. 5: 155 (1804); Pentapetes palmata (Cav.) Poir. in J.B.A.M.de Lamarck, Encycl. 5: 154 (1804); Pentapetes tiliifolia (Cav.) Poir. in J.B.A.M.de Lamarck, Encycl. 5: 156 (1804)

= Dombeya acutangula =

Species of flowering plant

Dombeya acutangula, the bois bete or mahot tantan, is a species of flowering plant in the family Malvaceae. It is native to the Mascarene Islands (Mauritius, Réunion, and Rodrigues), and Madagascar, Malawi, Mozambique, Tanzania, and Zambia.

It has charming pale (white or light pink) flowers in small clusters.

On Mauritius it grows in forests from 300 to 500 meters elevation. It is almost extinct on the island due to habitat loss; some 50 plants remain in the wild, growing in a narrowly circumscribed area at Corps de garde, Trois Mamelles, Yemen, Magenta and Chamarel.

== Systematics ==
Bois bete was sometimes placed in Pentapetes. It is somewhat variable and thus was described under a number of names, which are now considered junior synonyms:

- Pentapetes acutangula Poir.
- Pentapetes angulosa Poir.
- Pentapetes palmata Poir.

This species is rather isolated among its congeners and may belong to the more basal members of its genus. It differs both from the "xeric forest" group of Mascarene Dombeya (e.g. D. mauritiana and D. rodriguesiana) and the "rainforest group" (e.g. D. blattiolens and D. ciliata).
