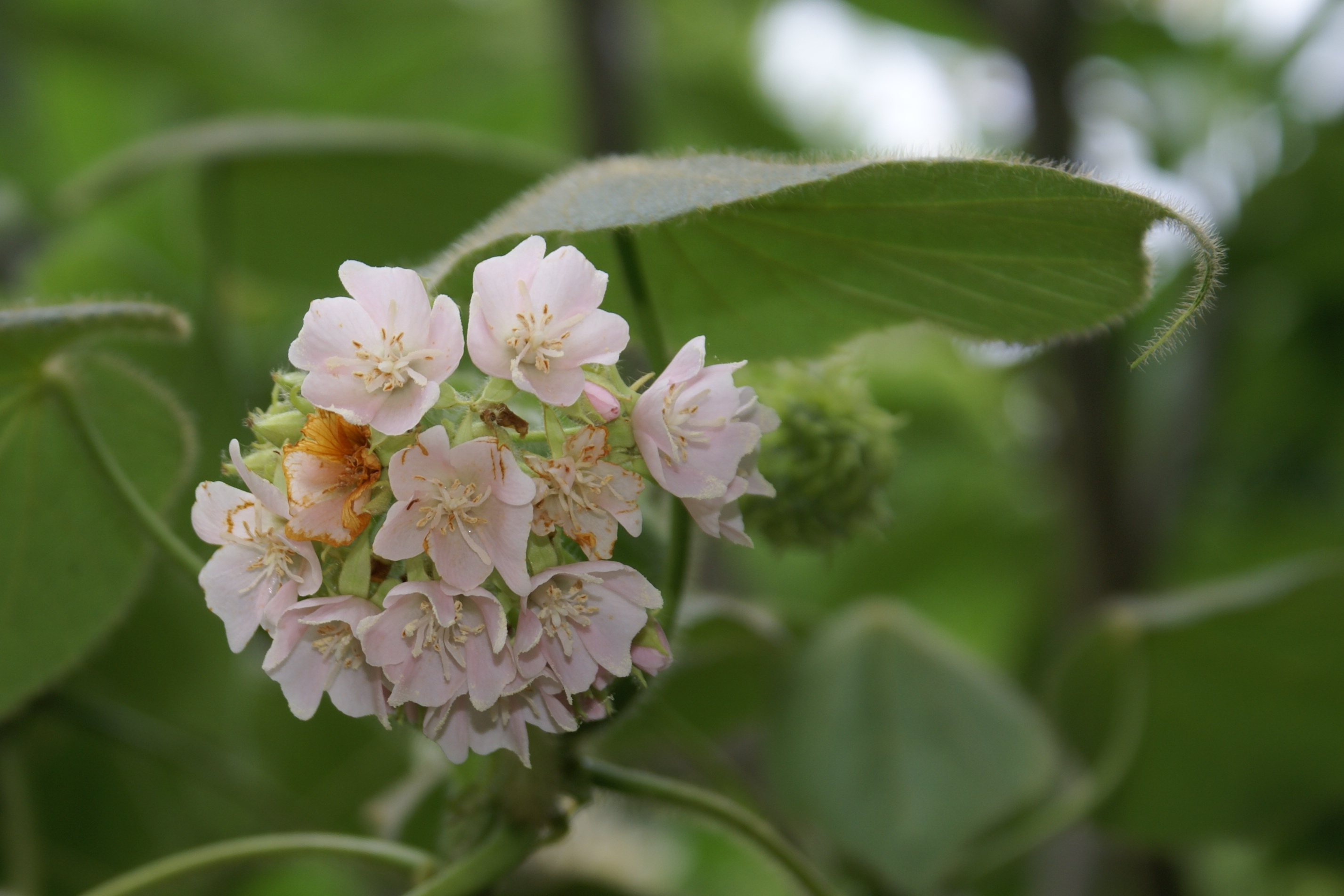

Scientific classification
- Kingdom: Plantae
- Clade: Tracheophytes
- Clade: Angiosperms
- Clade: Eudicots
- Clade: Rosids
- Order: Malvales
- Family: Malvaceae
- Genus: Dombeya
- Species: D. pilosa

Binomial name
- Dombeya pilosa Cordem.

Synonyms
- Dombeya bailloniana Arènes; Dombeya hispidipes Arènes; Dombeya pilosa var. amplifolia Cordem.; Dombeya pilosa var. globigera Cordem.

= Dombeya pilosa =

Species of flowering plant

Dombeya pilosa is a species of flowering plant in the family Malvaceae.

== Distribution ==
Dombeya pilosa is found in La Réunion.
