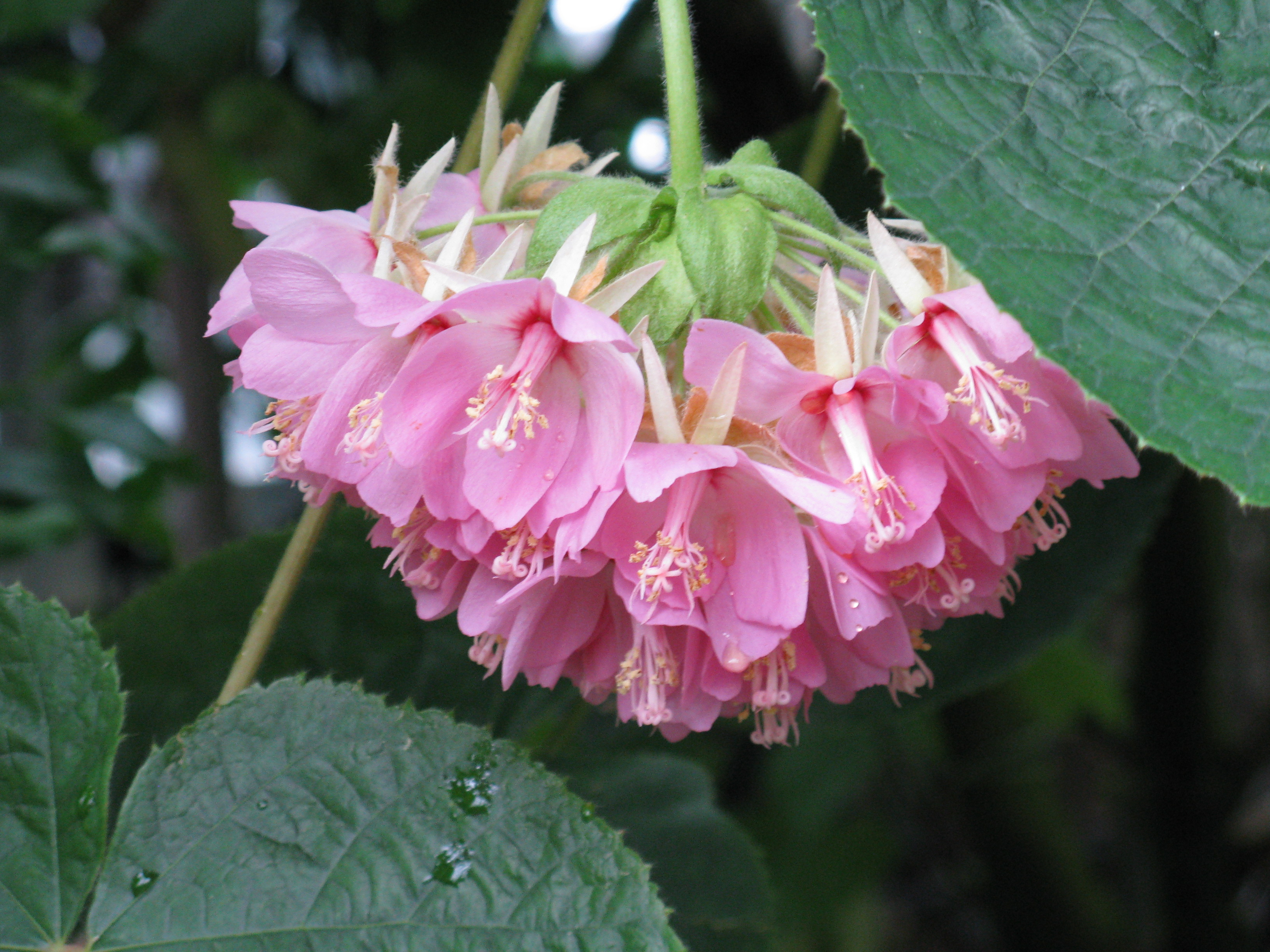
- Pink-ball (Dombeya wallichii) inflorescence

Scientific classification
- Kingdom: Plantae
- Clade: Tracheophytes
- Clade: Angiosperms
- Clade: Eudicots
- Clade: Rosids
- Order: Malvales
- Family: Malvaceae
- Subfamily: Dombeyoideae
- Genus: Dombeya; Cav. (1786)

Species
- Several, see text

Synonyms
- Acropetalum A.Juss. (1849), nom. superfl.; Assonia Cav. (1786); Astrapaea Lindl. (1821); Cavanilla J.F.Gmel. (1792); Hilsenbergia Bojer (1842), nom. illeg.; Leeuwenhoeckia E.Mey. ex Endl. (1839), not validly publ.; Vahlia Dahl (1787), nom. illeg.; Walcuffa J.F.Gmel. (1792); Walkuffa Bruce ex Steud.; Xeropetalum Delile (1826)

= Dombeya =

Genus of flowering plants

Dombeya is a flowering plant genus. Traditionally included in the family Sterculiaceae, it is included in the expanded Malvaceae in the APG and most subsequent systematics. These plants are known by a number of vernacular names which sometimes, misleadingly, allude to the superficial similarity of flowering Dombeya to pears or hydrangeas (which are unrelated). Therefore, the genus as a whole is often simply called dombeyas. The generic name commemorates Joseph Dombey (1742–1794), a French botanist and explorer in South America, involved in the notorious "Dombey affair", embroiling scientists and governments of France, Spain, and Britain for more than two years.

== Distribution ==
These plants grow chiefly throughout Africa and Madagascar. Madagascar has the majority of species, with approximately 175 native species. 19 are found on the African mainland, with one, Dombeya torrida, also extending into the southwestern Arabian Peninsula. 24 species are native to the Mascarene Islands, of which 23 are endemic to the islands. Dombeya acutangula is native to east Africa, Madagascar, and the Mascarenes, with a disjunct population in Laos in Southeast Asia.

== Taxonomy ==
Formerly believed to hold only about 80 species, in the present delimitation, Dombeya is one of the most speciose Malvaceae genera, containing as many as 255 species. Most have been moved here from distinct genera, which are now considered junior synonyms. Some of these might warrant recognition as subgenera, to show the evolutionary and phylogenetic patterns of the numerous dombeyas more clearly. In addition to the synonyms listed here, Astiria is suspected to be a rather distinct derivative of Dombeya and would thus have to be included in the present genus. This requires renaming of species, as A. rosea conflicts with D. rosea, a junior synonym of D. burgessiae. Furthermore, several species have been moved here from related genera that are still valid, namely Pentapetes.

Dombeya of L'Héritier de Brutelle is a synonym of Tourrettia (Bignoniaceae). Dombeya of Lamarck is a synonym of Araucaria.

== Selected species ==
There are 197 accepted species of Dombeya. Selected species include:

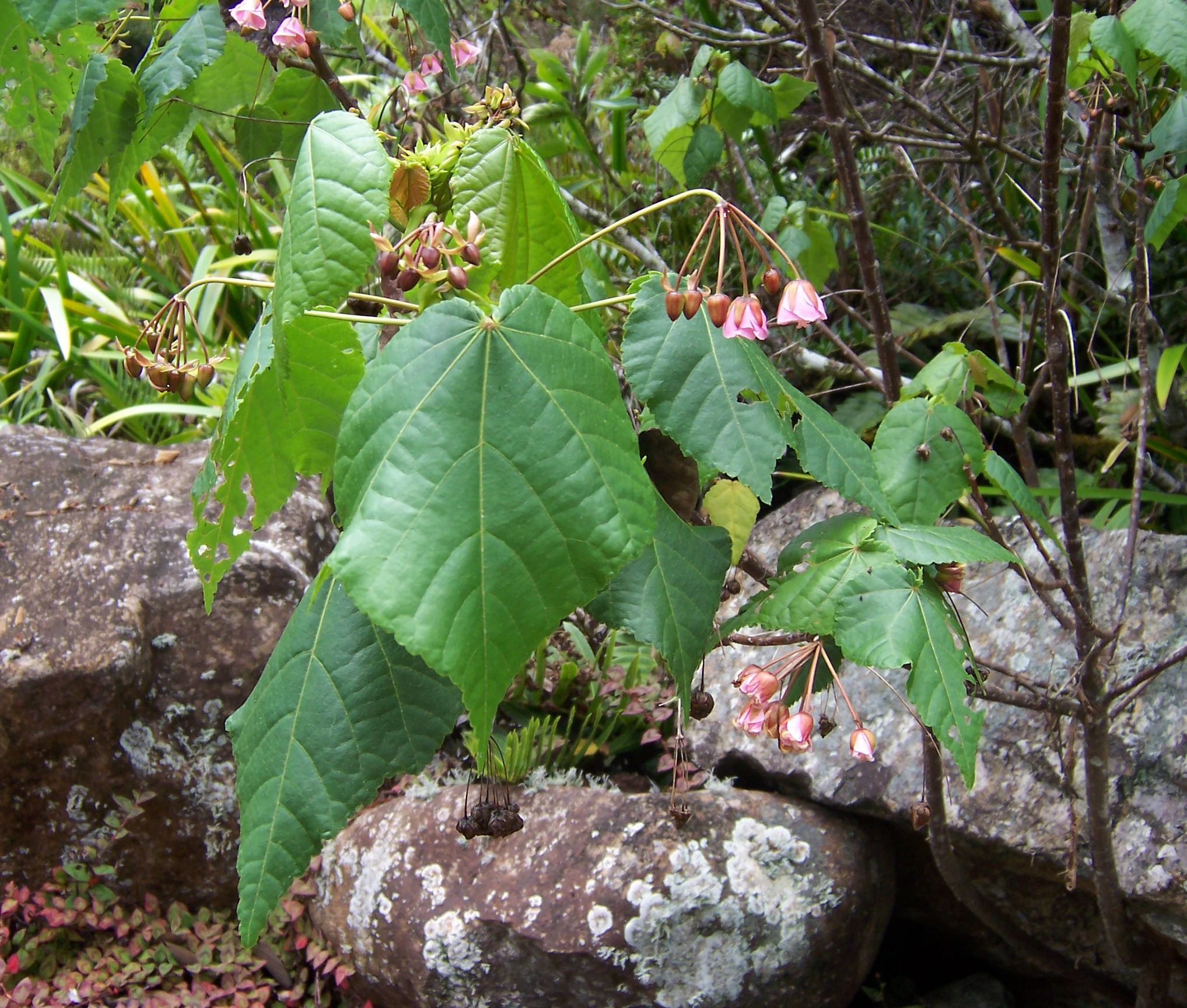
Dombeya elegans

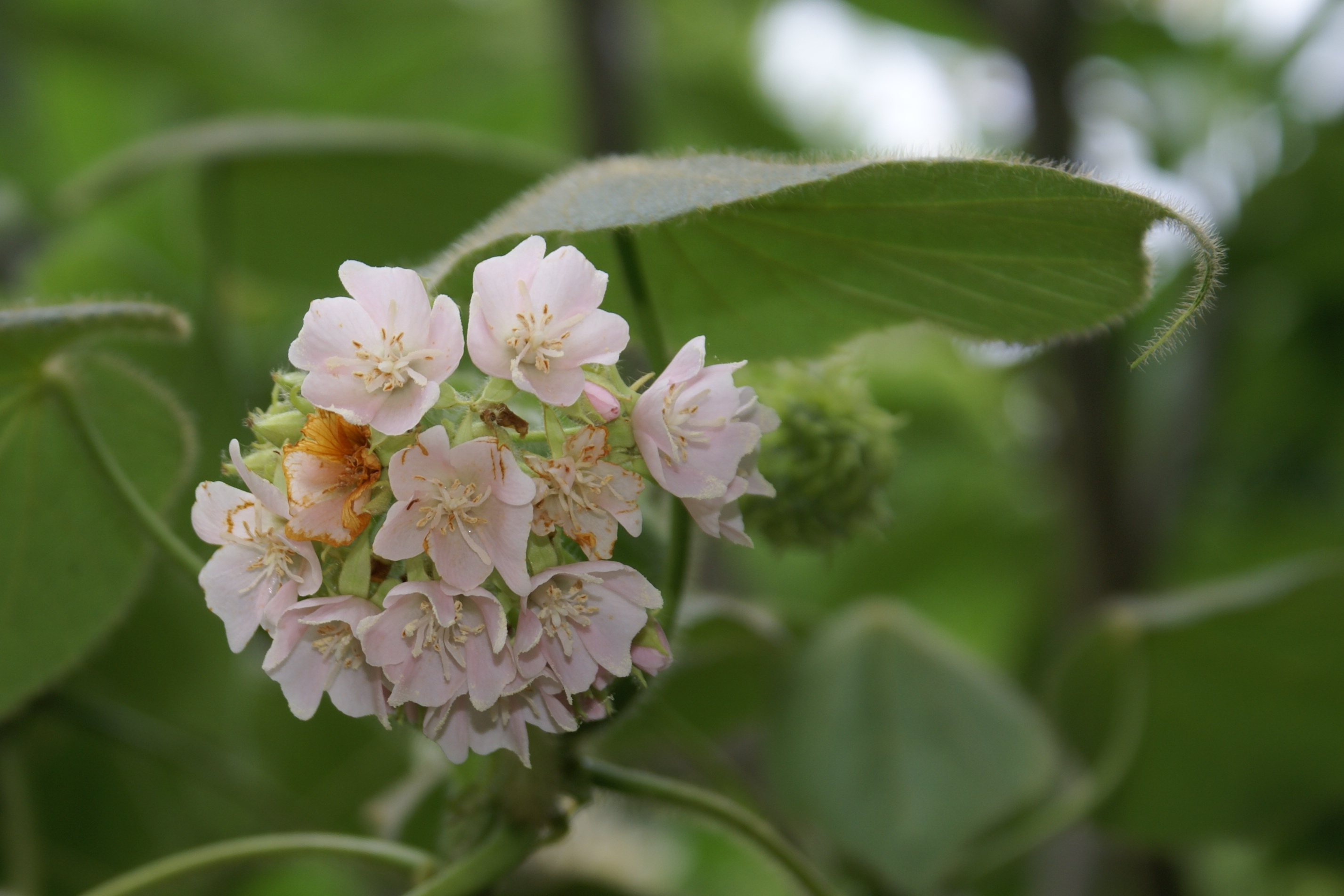
Dombeya pilosa flowers

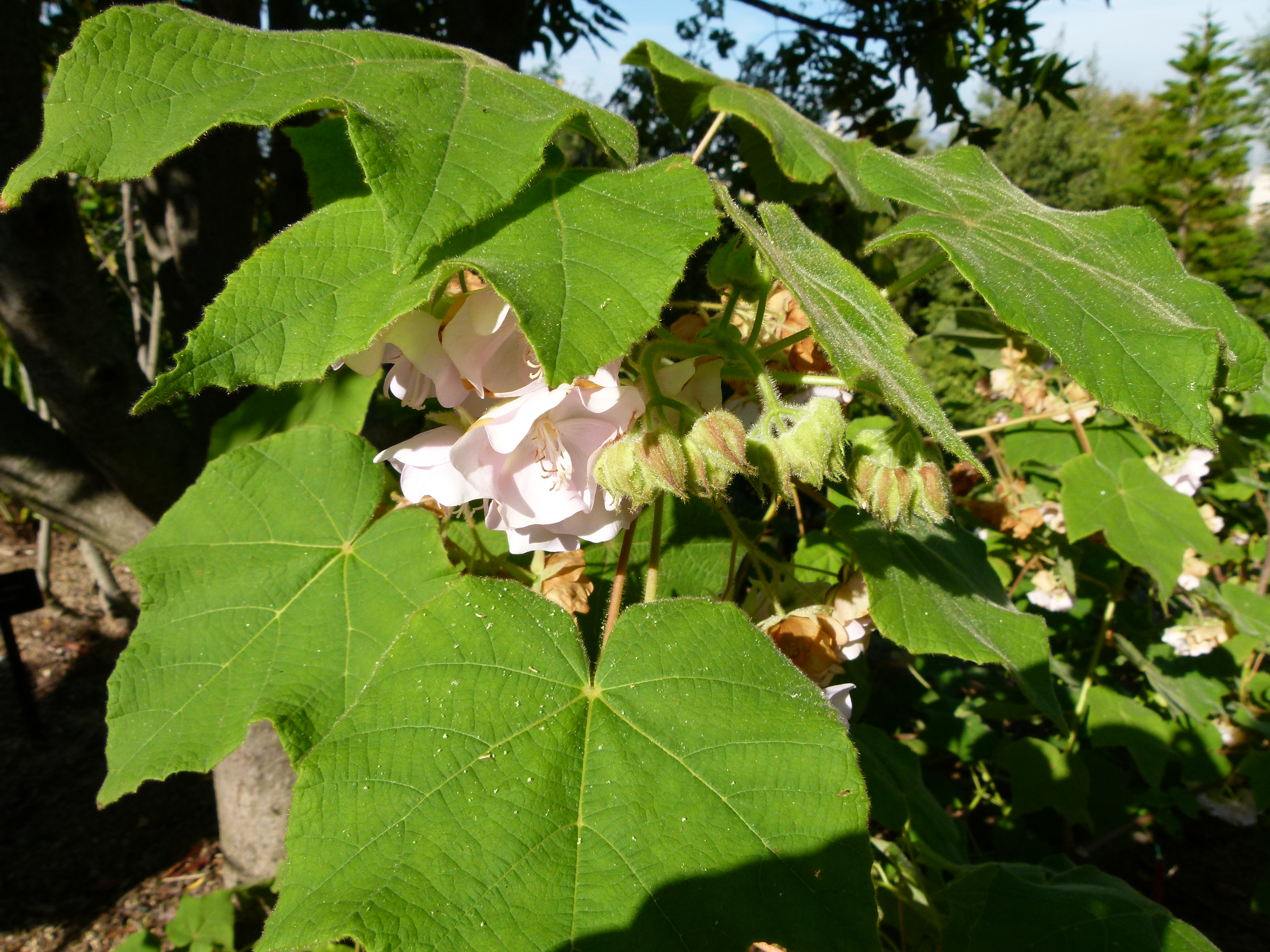
Dombeya burgessiae

- Dombeya acuminatissima Hochr. – eastern Madagascar
- Dombeya acutangula Cav. – Bois Bete, mahot tantan. East Africa (Tanzania to Mozambique), Madagascar, Mascarene Islands, and Laos
- Dombeya aethiopica Gilli – Ethiopia
- Dombeya albisquama Arènes – central-eastern Madagascar
- Dombeya albotomentosa Arènes – central Madagascar
- Dombeya alleizettei Arènes – central Madagascar
- Dombeya amaniensis Engl. – Tanzania
- Dombeya ambalabeensis Arènes – southwestern and southern Madagascar
- Dombeya ambatosoratrensis Arènes – central-eastern Madagascar
- Dombeya ambohitrensis Arènes – northern Madagascar
- Dombeya ambositrensis Arènes – central Madagascar
- Dombeya ameliae Guill. – east-central Madagascar
- Dombeya amplifolia Arènes – central-eastern Madagascar
- Dombeya anakaensis Arènes – southwestern Madagascar
- Dombeya andapensis Arènes – central and eastern Madagascar
- Dombeya andrahomanensis Arènes – southern Madagascar
- Dombeya angustipetala Arènes – eastern Madagascar
- Dombeya ankaratrensis Arènes – central Madagascar
- Dombeya ankazobeensis Arènes – central Madagascar
- Dombeya anonyensis Arènes – central Madagascar
- Dombeya antsianakensis Baill. – central and eastern Madagascar
- Dombeya apikyensis Arènes – southeastern Madagascar
- Dombeya aquifoliopsis Hochr. – eastern Madagascar
- Dombeya asymmetrica Appleq. – Madagascar
- Dombeya australis Scott Elliot – southeastern Madagascar
- Dombeya autumnalis I.Verd. – Northern Province of South Africa
- Dombeya baronii Baker – central and eastern Madagascar
- Dombeya bathiei Hochr. – central Madagascar
- Dombeya befotakensis Arènes – eastern Madagascar
- Dombeya bemarivensis (Hochr.) Arènes – central Madagascar
- Dombeya biumbellata Baker – central Madagascar
- Dombeya blattiolens Frapp. ex Cordem. – Réunion
- Dombeya borraginea Hochr. – western Madagascar
- Dombeya breonii Baill. – central and eastern Madagascar
- Dombeya brevistyla Arènes – central and eastern Madagascar
- Dombeya buettneri K.Schum. – tropical Africa from Guinea to Ethiopia and Zambia
- Dombeya burgessiae Gerrard ex Harv. (= D. greenwayi Wild, D. mastersii Hook.f., D. parvifolia K.Schum., D. rosea E.G.Baker, D. tanganyikensis Baker) – South Sudan to Angola and South Africa
- Dombeya cacuminum Hochr. – northern and central Madagascar
- Dombeya cannabina Hils. & Bojer ex Hook. – central Madagascar
- Dombeya capuroniana Arènes – north-central Madagascar (Montagne d'Ambre)
- Dombeya capuronii Arènes – central Madagascar
- Dombeya catatii Hochr. – southeastern Madagascar
- Dombeya ciliata Cordem. – Réunion
- Dombeya condensata Hochr. – central Madagascar
- Dombeya coria Baill. – central and eastern Madagascar
- Dombeya cymosa Harv. – southern Mozambique to South Africa
- Dombeya decanthera Cav. (= D. bojeriana Baill., Melhania decanthera (Cav.) DC) – southeastern Madagascar
- Dombeya delislei Arènes – Réunion
- Dombeya elegans Cordem. – sometimes included in D. burgessiae – Réunion
- Dombeya ficulnea Baill. – sometimes erroneously included in D. punctata. – Réunion
- Dombeya formosa Le Péchon & Pausé – Réunion
- Dombeya glandulosissima Arènes – eastern Madagascar
- Dombeya kirkii Mast. – southern Ethiopia to KwaZulu-Natal
- Dombeya laurifolia (Bojer) Baill. (= D. parkeri Baill., D. valimpony R.Vig. & Humbert, D. valimpony f. obovalopsis Hochr., Melhania laurifolia Bojer) – central Madagascar
- Dombeya leandrii Arènes – western Madagascar
- Dombeya ledermannii Engl. – Nigeria and Cameroon
- Dombeya longebracteolata Seyani – southwestern and southern Ethiopia
- Dombeya montana (Hochr.) Arènes (= D. acerifolia var. montana Hochr.) – central Madagascar
- Dombeya palmatisecta Hochr. – Madagascar
- Dombeya pilosa Cordem. – Réunion
- Dombeya pulchra N.E.Br. – South Africa: Northern Province to KwaZulu-Natal
- Dombeya punctata Cav. (= D. lancea Cordem., D. pervillei Baill., Pentapetes punctata Poir.) – Réunion
- Dombeya quinqueseta (Delile) Exell – tropical Africa to Namibia
- Dombeya reclinata Cordem. – Réunion
- Dombeya rottleroides Baill. – northern and central Madagascar
- Dombeya rotundifolia (Hochst.) Planch. – Blompeer or "South African Wild Pear". southern Ethiopia to South Africa
- Dombeya shupangae K.Schum. – southeastern Kenya to Mozambique and Democratic Republic of the Congo
- Dombeya spectabilis Bojer (= D. chapelieri Baill., D. humblotii Baill., D. lantziana Baill., D. rotundifolia Bojer) – east-central Madagascar
- Dombeya tiliacea (Endl.) Planch. (= Xeropetalum tiliaceum Endl.) – South Africa: Eastern Cape Province to KwaZulu-Natal
- Dombeya torrida (J.F.Gmel.) Bamps – Central African Republic to Eritrea, Zambia, and Malawi; also Yemen and southwestern Saudi Arabia.
- Dombeya tsaratananensis (Hochr.) Arènes (= D. ficulnea var. tsaratananensis Hochr.) – central Madagascar
- Dombeya umbellata Cav. (= Pentapetes umbellata Poir.) – Réunion
- Dombeya wallichii (Lindl.) K.Schum. (= Astrapaea wallichii Lindl.) – Pink-ball, "Tropical Hydrangea". Eastern Madagascar

=== Formerly placed here ===
- Friedmannodendron rodriguesiana (F.Friedmann) Le Péchon & Skema (as Dombeya rodriguesiana F.Friedmann) – Rodrigues
