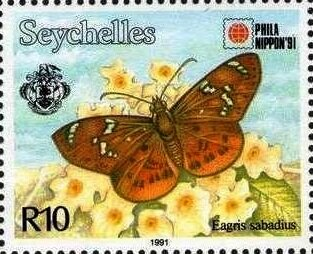

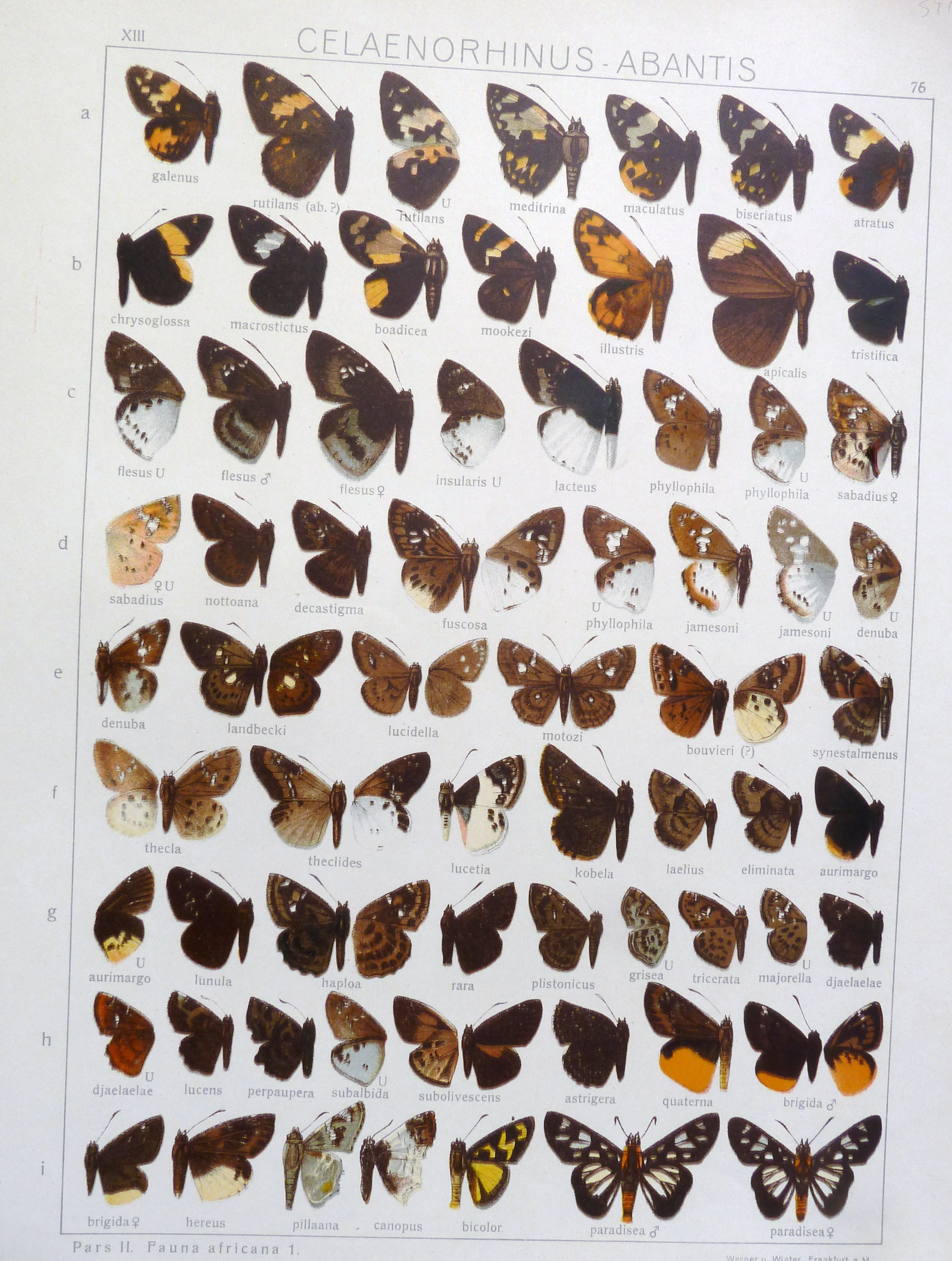

Scientific classification
- Kingdom: Animalia
- Phylum: Arthropoda
- Class: Insecta
- Order: Lepidoptera
- Family: Hesperiidae
- Genus: Eagris
- Species: E. sabadius

Binomial name
- Eagris sabadius (Gray, 1832)

Synonyms
- List: Hesperia sabadius Gray, 1832; Thymele sabadius Boisduval, 1833; Eagris sabadius var. mauritiana Mabille and Boullet, 1916; Eagris sabadius var. aldabranus Fryer, 1912; Hesperia andracne Boisduval, 1833; Plesioneura hyalinata Saalmüller, 1878; Eagris astoria Holland, 1896; Eagris epira Karsch, 1896; Eagris plicata Butler, 1901; Eagris ochreana Lathy, 1901

= Eagris sabadius =

Species of butterfly

Eagris sabadius is a species of butterfly in the family Hesperiidae. It is found in Uganda, Kenya, Tanzania, Malawi, Zambia, Zimbabwe and on Madagascar, Mauritius, Réunion, the Seychelles and the Comoro Islands. The habitat consists of montane forests, forests and forest margins.

The larvae feed on Grewia similis, Grewia forbesii, Hibiscus × rosa-sinensis, Dombeya burgessiae and Rhus species.

== Subspecies ==
- Eagris sabadius sabadius (Mauritius, Reunion)
- Eagris sabadius aldabranus Fryer, 1912 (Seychelles: Aldabra)
- Eagris sabadius andracne (Boisduval, 1833) (Madagascar)
- Eagris sabadius astoria Holland, 1896 (eastern Uganda, central and western Kenya, northern Tanzania)
- Eagris sabadius comorana Evans, 1937 (Comoro Islands)
- Eagris sabadius isabella Turlin, 1995 (Comoro Islands)
- Eagris sabadius maheta Evans, 1937 (Seychelles)
- Eagris sabadius ochreana Lathy, 1901 (Malawi, north-eastern Zambia, Tanzania, south-eastern Kenya)
