= Dombeya ledermannii =

Conservation status
- Critically Endangered (IUCN 2.3)

Scientific classification
- Kingdom: Plantae
- Clade: Tracheophytes
- Clade: Angiosperms
- Clade: Eudicots
- Clade: Rosids
- Order: Malvales
- Family: Malvaceae
- Genus: Dombeya
- Species: D. ledermannii

Binomial name
- Dombeya ledermannii Engl.

Synonyms
- Dombeya discolor Engl.

Species of flowering plant

Dombeya ledermannii is a species of flowering plant in the family Malvaceae. It is found in Cameroon and Nigeria. Its natural habitat is subtropical or tropical dry forests. It is threatened by habitat loss.
