= Dombeya aethiopica =

Conservation status
- Least Concern (IUCN 3.1)

Scientific classification
- Kingdom: Plantae
- Clade: Tracheophytes
- Clade: Angiosperms
- Clade: Eudicots
- Clade: Rosids
- Order: Malvales
- Family: Malvaceae
- Genus: Dombeya
- Species: D. aethiopica

Binomial name
- Dombeya aethiopica Gilli

Species of flowering plant

Dombeya aethiopica is a species of flowering plant in the Malvaceae family. It is found only in Ethiopia.
