= Dombeya longebracteolata =

Conservation status
- Vulnerable (IUCN 3.1)

Scientific classification
- Kingdom: Plantae
- Clade: Tracheophytes
- Clade: Angiosperms
- Clade: Eudicots
- Clade: Rosids
- Order: Malvales
- Family: Malvaceae
- Genus: Dombeya
- Species: D. longebracteolata

Binomial name
- Dombeya longebracteolata Seyani

Species of flowering plant

Dombeya longebracteolata is a species of flowering plant in the family Malvaceae. It is found only in Ethiopia.
