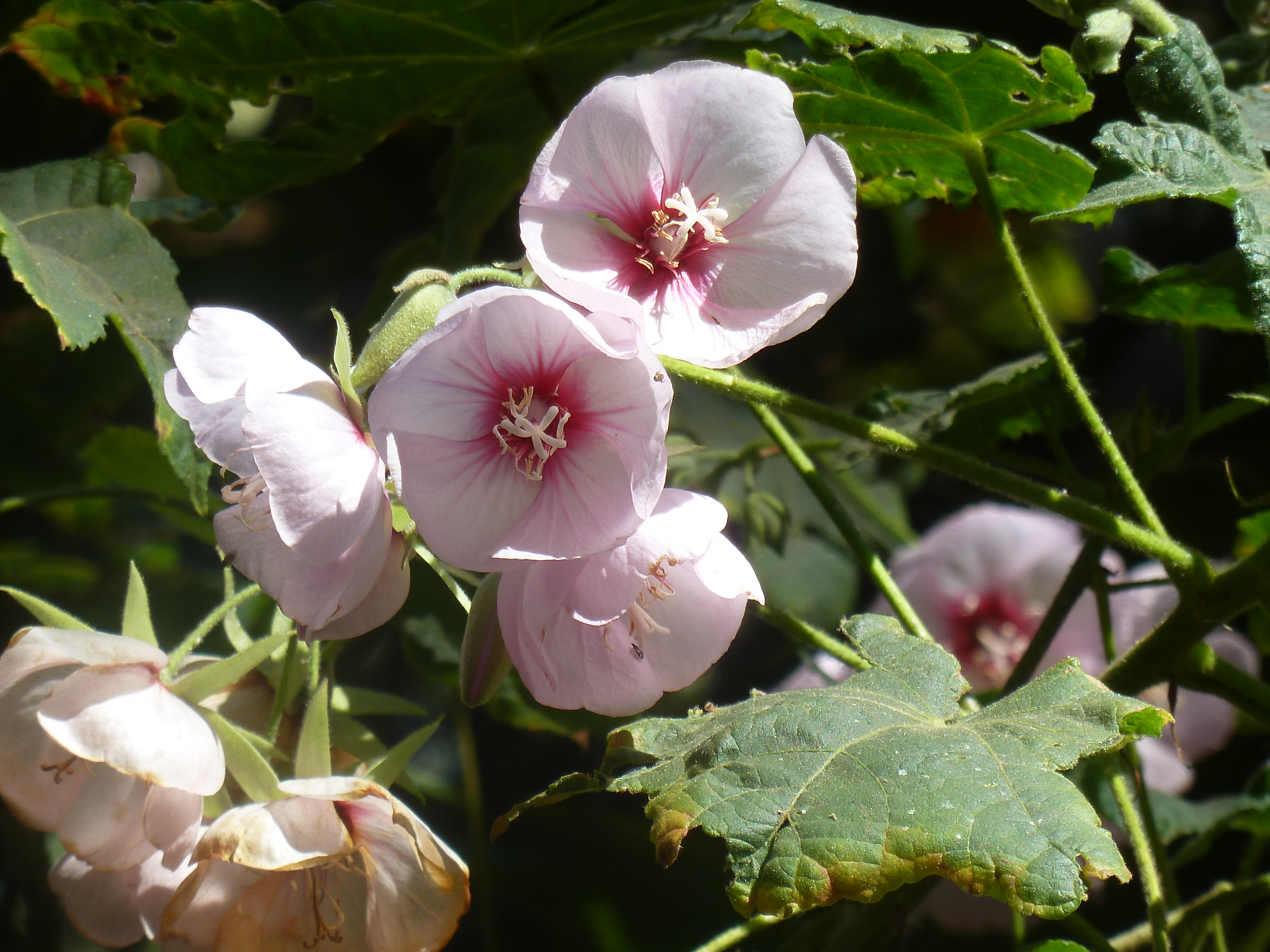
- Flowers
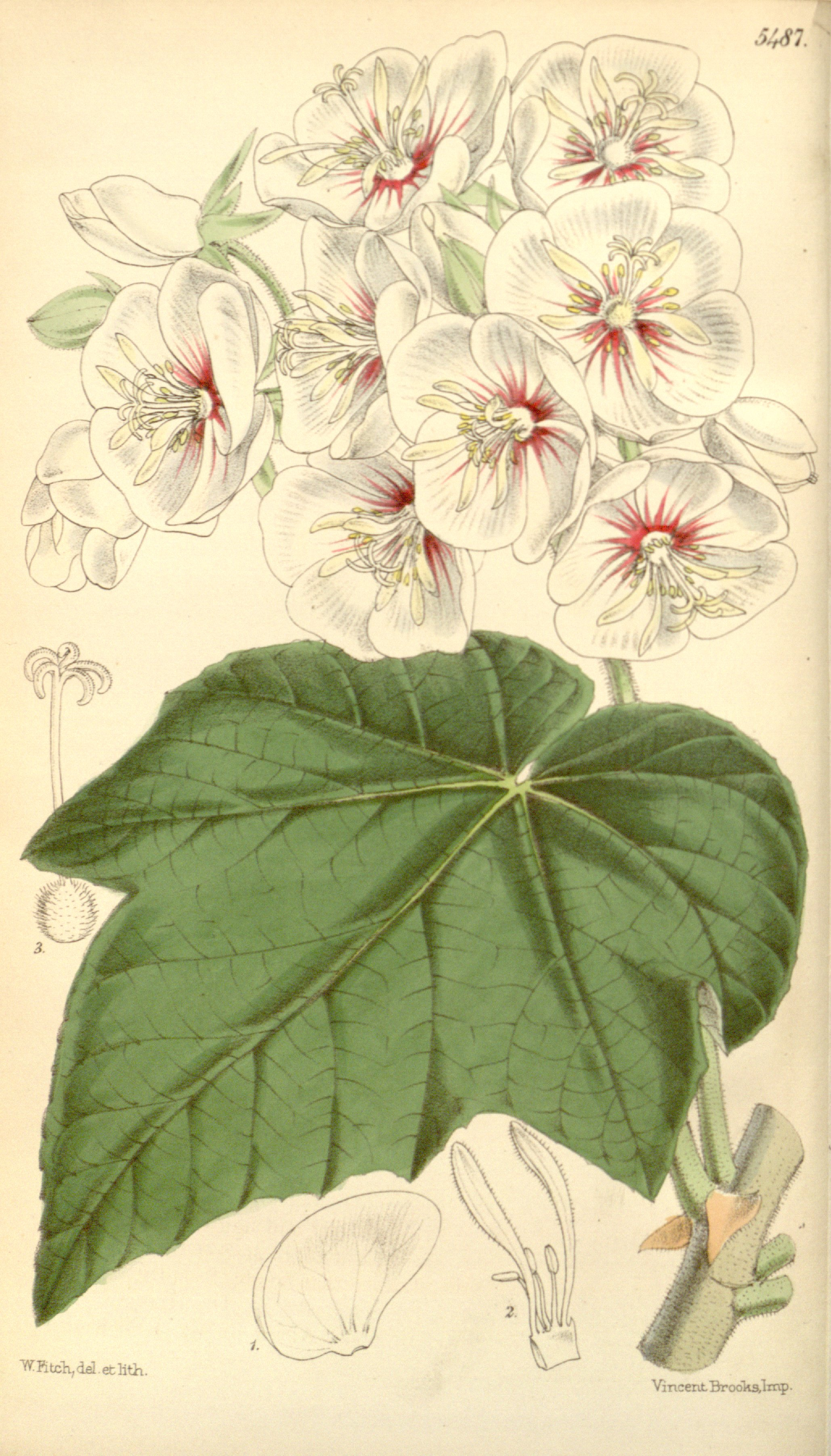
- Botanical illustration

Conservation status
- Least Concern (IUCN 3.1)

Scientific classification
- Kingdom: Plantae
- Clade: Embryophytes
- Clade: Tracheophytes
- Clade: Spermatophytes
- Clade: Angiosperms
- Clade: Eudicots
- Clade: Rosids
- Order: Malvales
- Family: Malvaceae
- Genus: Dombeya
- Species: D. burgessiae

Binomial name
- Dombeya burgessiae Gerrard ex Harv.

Synonyms
- List: Assonia burgessiae (Gerrard ex Harv.) Kuntze; Assonia calantha (K.Schum.) Stuntz; Assonia sparmannioides Hiern; Dombeya angulata Mast.; Dombeya antunesii Exell & Mendonça; Dombeya auriculata K.Schum.; Dombeya burttii Exell; Dombeya calantha K.Schum.; Dombeya concinna K.Schum.; Dombeya dawei Sprague; Dombeya endlichii Engl. & K.Krause; Dombeya gamwelliae Exell; Dombeya globiflora Staner; Dombeya greenwayi Wild; Dombeya johnstonii Baker; Dombeya kindtiana De Wild.; Dombeya lasiostylis K.Schum.; Dombeya mastersii Hook.f.; Dombeya nairobensis Engl.; Dombeya nyasica Exell; Dombeya parvifolia K.Schum.; Dombeya platypoda K.Schum.; Dombeya rosea Baker f.; Dombeya sparmannioides (Hiern) K.Schum.; Dombeya sphaerantha Gilli; Dombeya tanganyikensis Baker; Dombeya trichoclada Mildbr.; Dombeya velutina De Wild. & Staner

= Dombeya burgessiae =

Species of flowering plant

Dombeya burgessiae, the rosemound, is a widespread species of flowering plant in the family Malvaceae. It is native to seasonally dry areas of tropical Africa, and has been introduced to Pakistan, Assam, and Trinidad and Tobago. A variable shrub or multi-stemmed tree from 2 to 8 m (7 to 26 ft) tall, it is used for its fiber (for ropes and baskets), wood (bows and tool handles), its edible pith, and for friction sticks to make fire. It is occasionally planted as an ornamental.

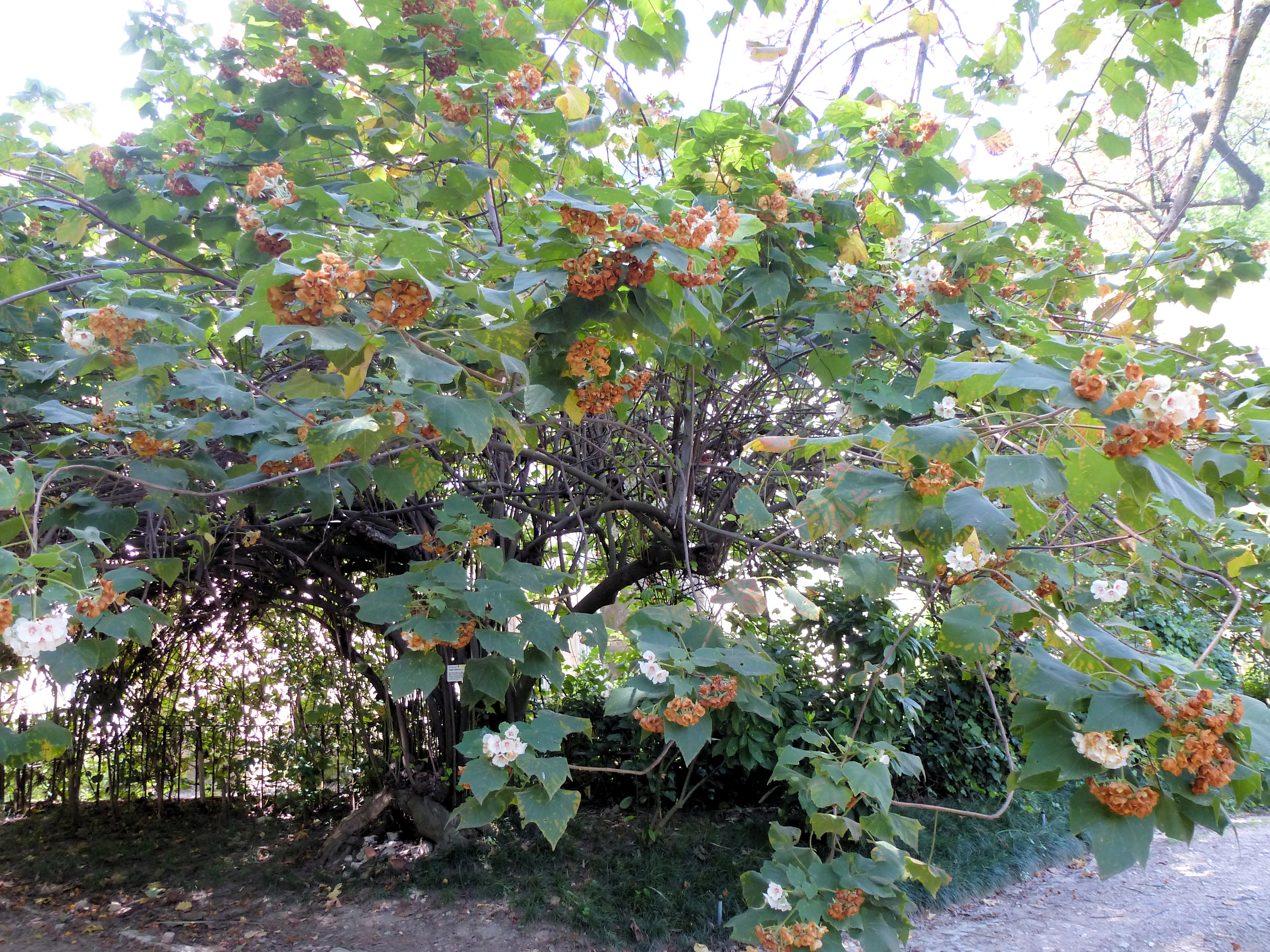
Growth habit

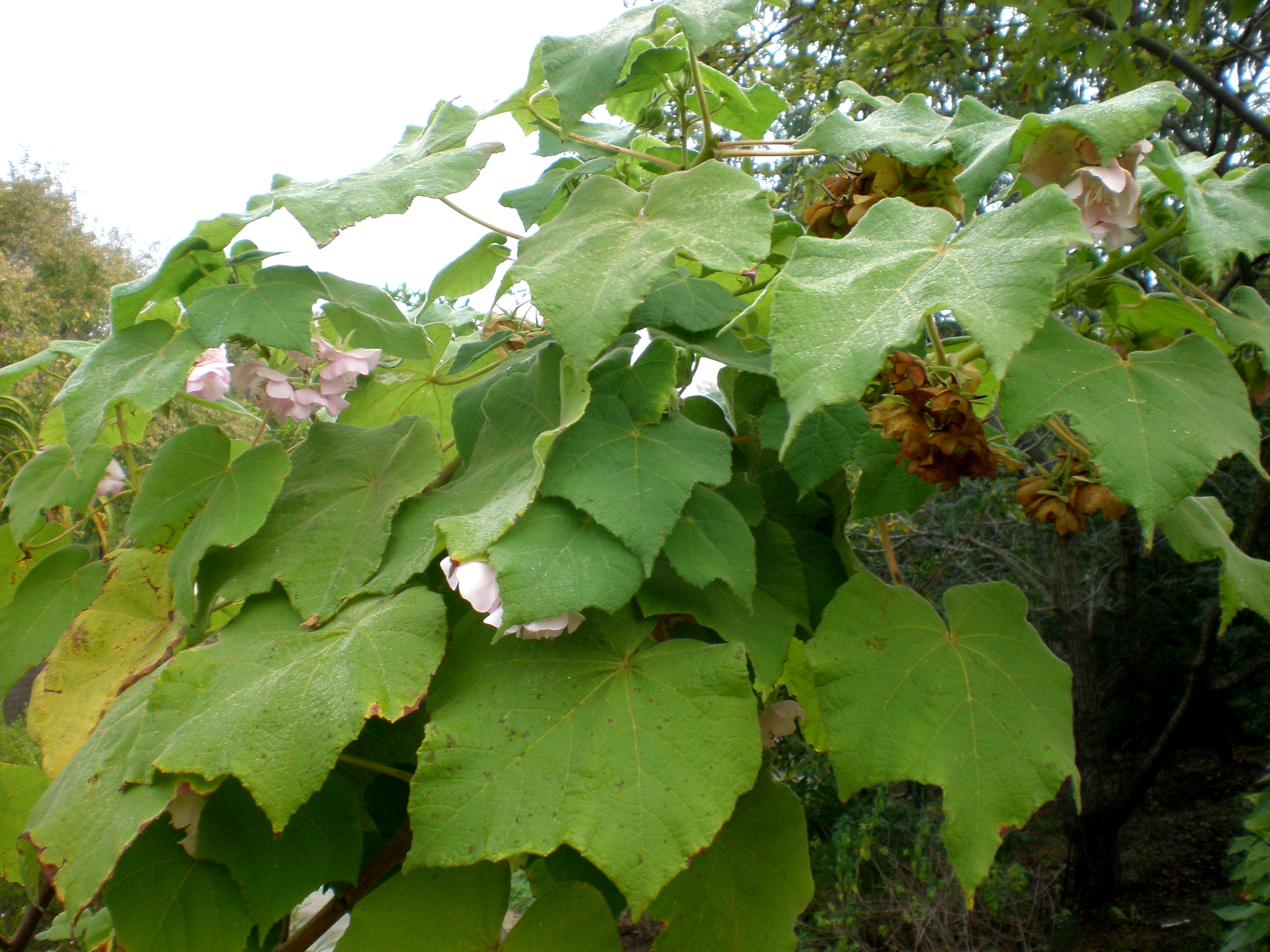
Foliage

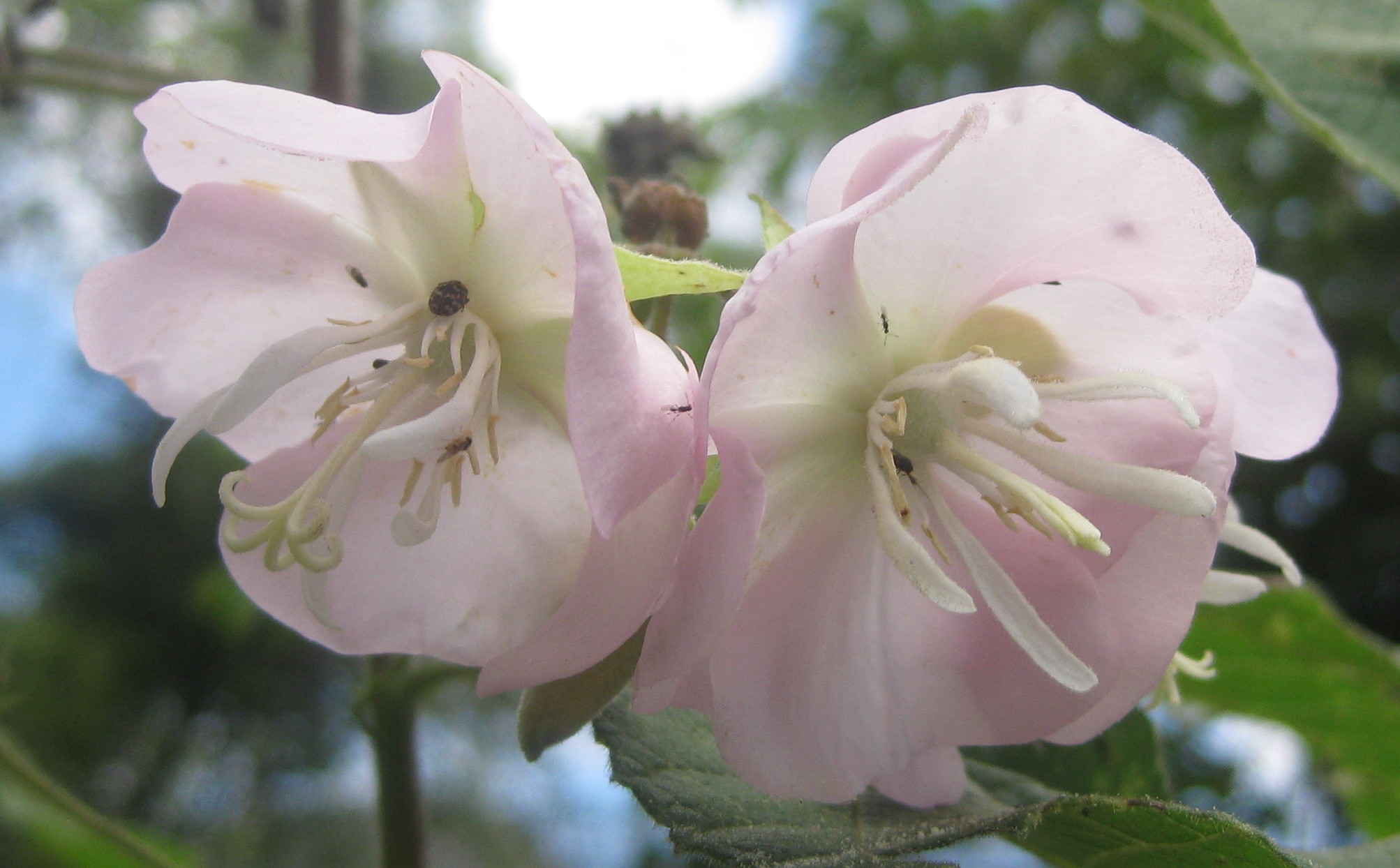
Extreme close-up of flowers

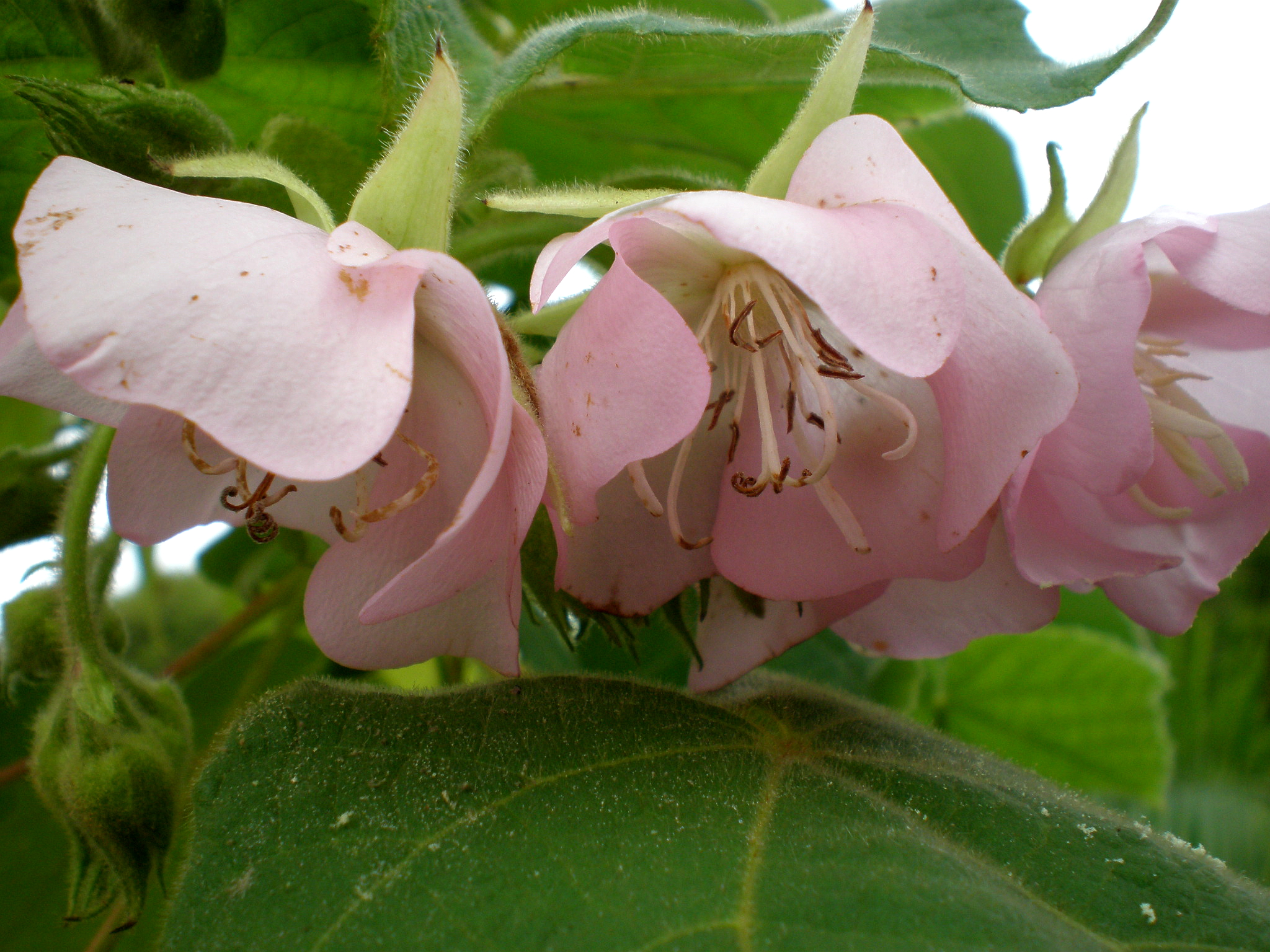
Flowers beginning to senesce

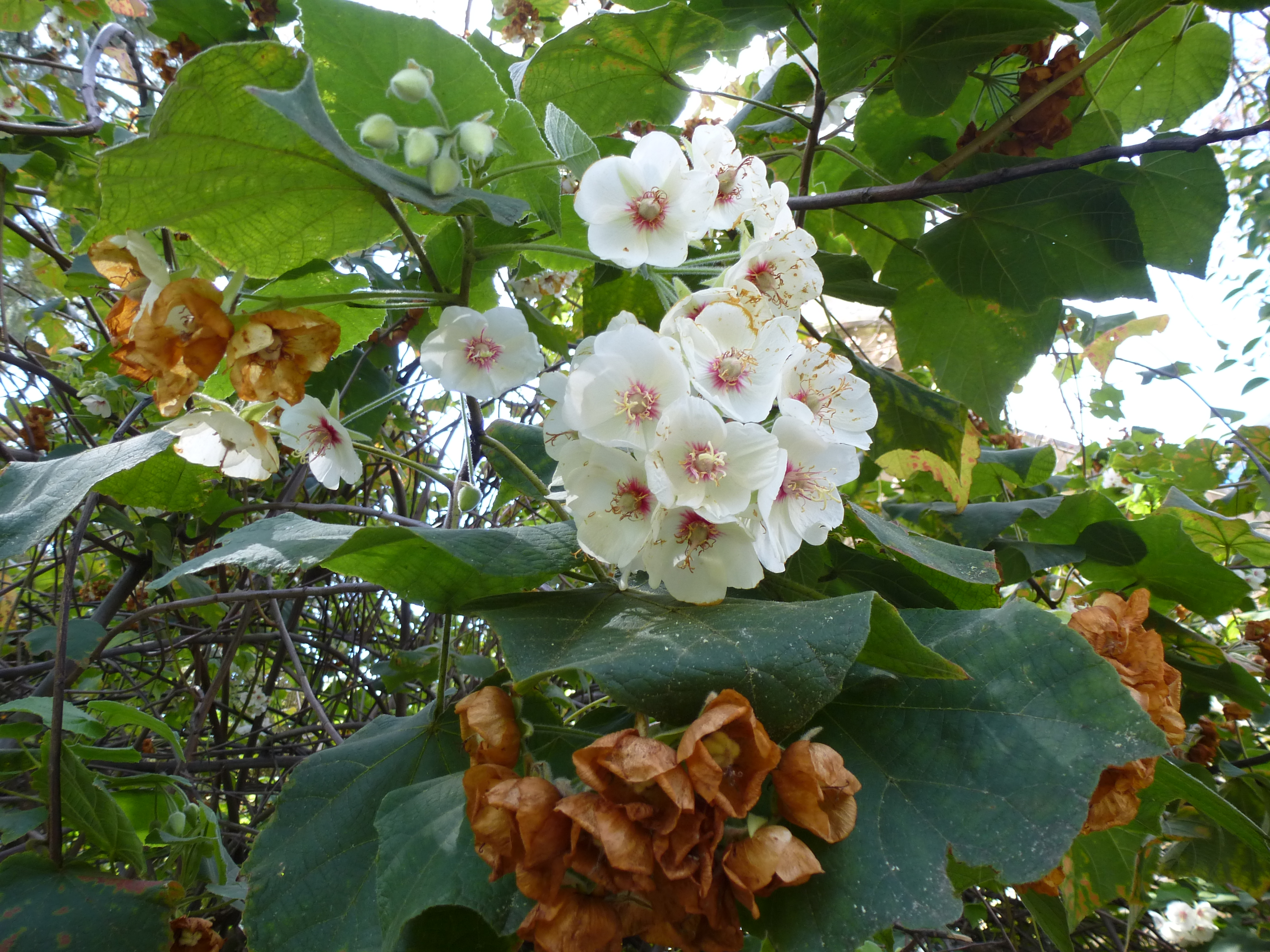
Budding, mature, and spent flowers

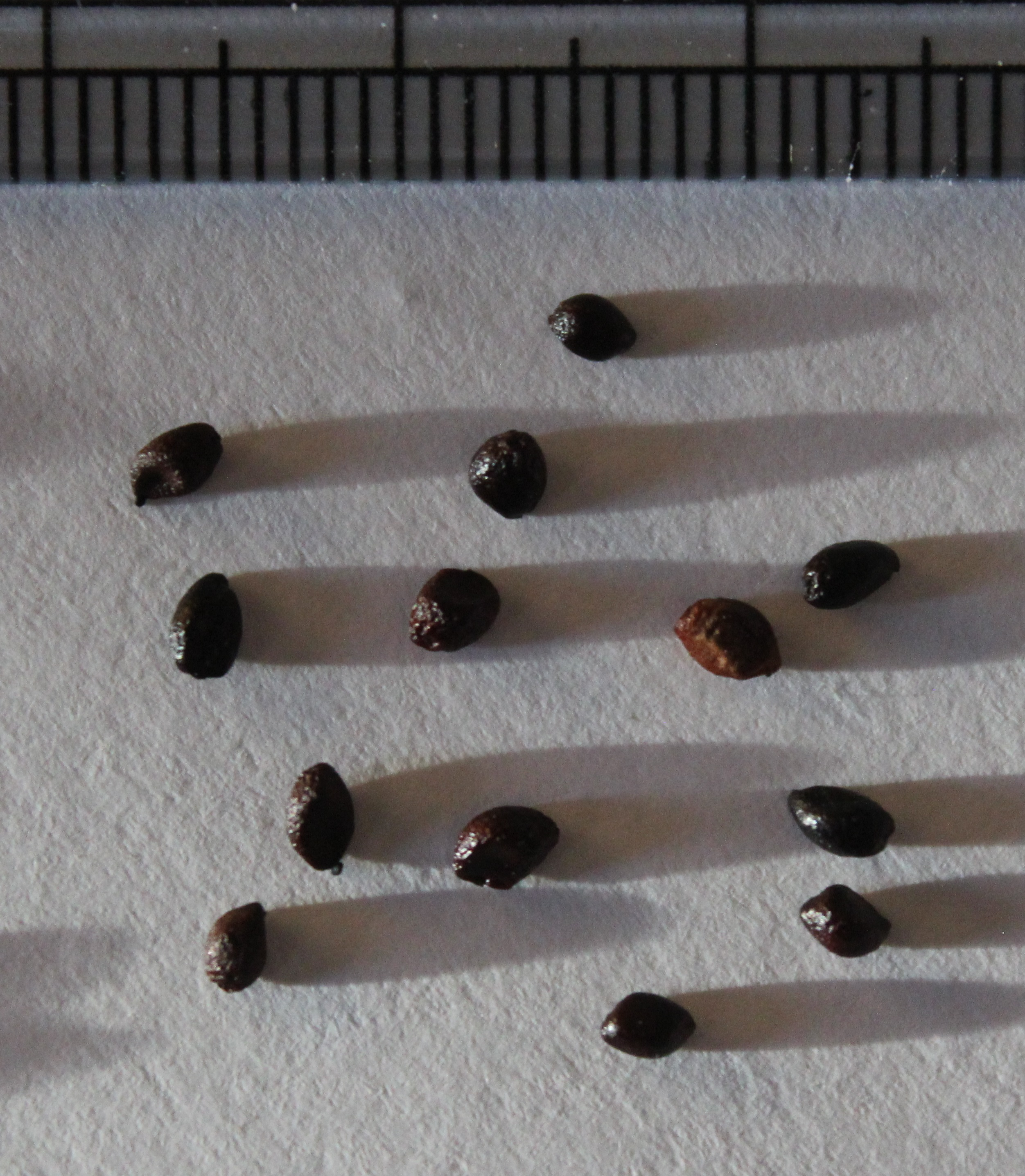
Seeds

== Larval food plant ==
Dombeya burgessiae is known to be a larval host plant of the Hesperiidae Eagris sabadius (Grey, 1832) and Abantis pillaana (Wallengren, 1857).
