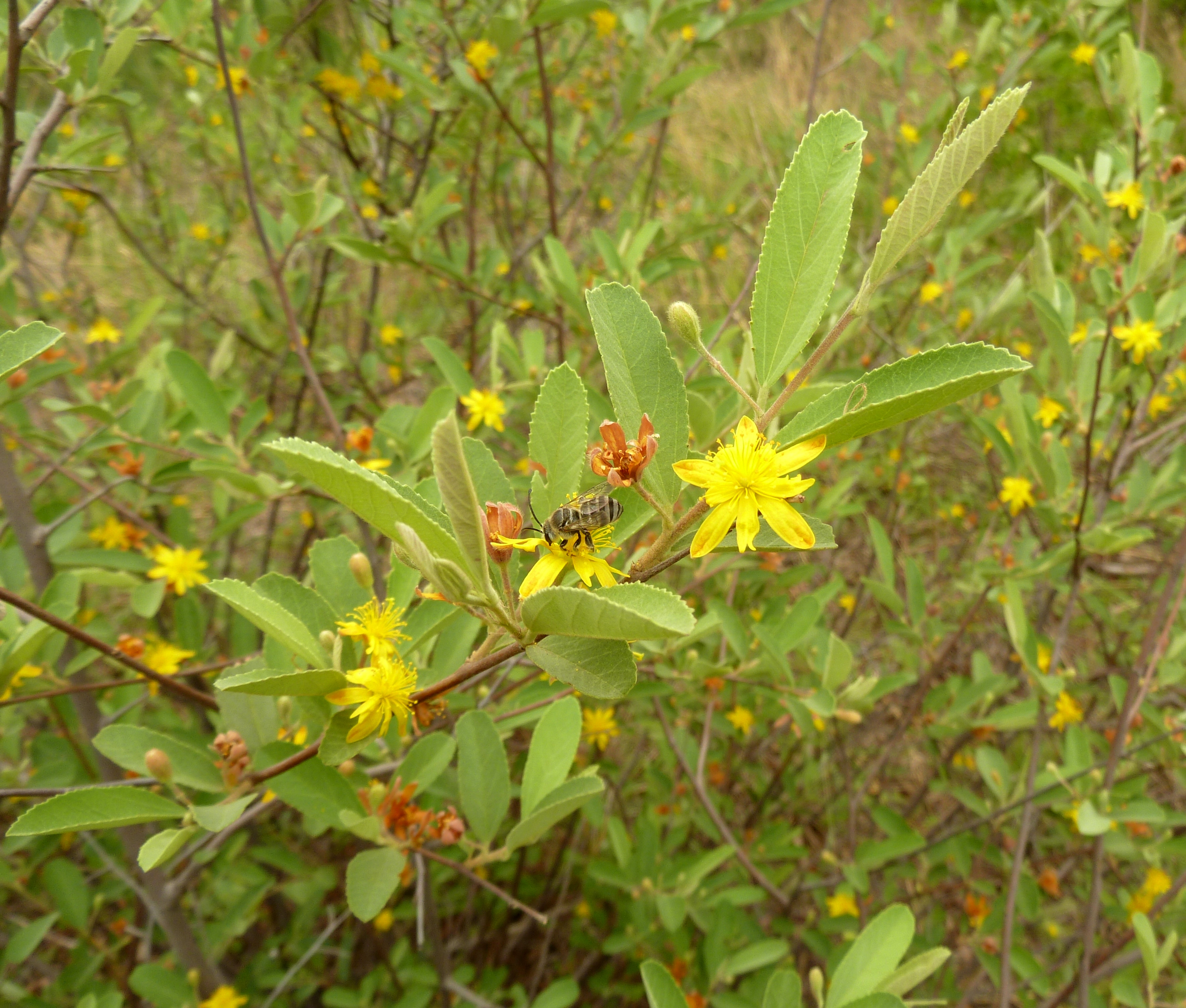
- Flowers
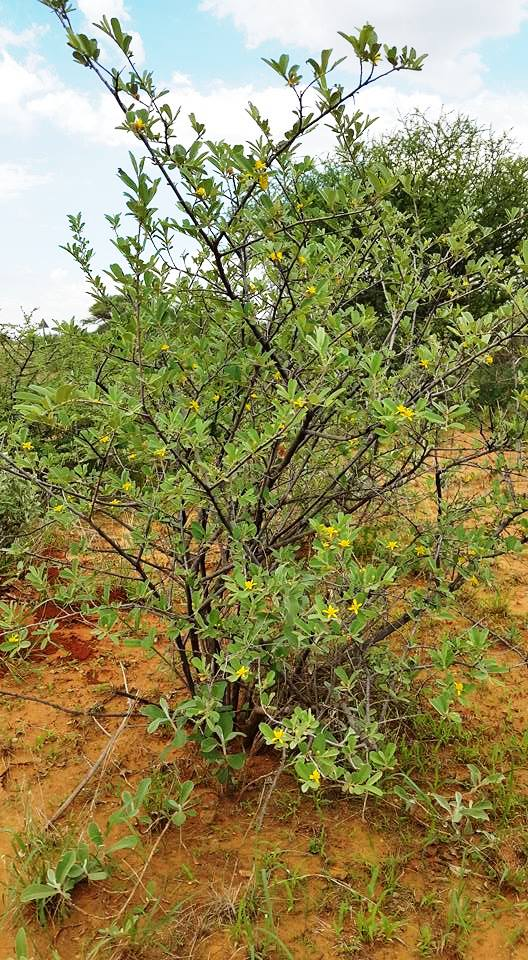
- Habit

Conservation status
- Least Concern (IUCN 3.1)

Scientific classification
- Kingdom: Plantae
- Clade: Tracheophytes
- Clade: Angiosperms
- Clade: Eudicots
- Clade: Rosids
- Order: Malvales
- Family: Malvaceae
- Genus: Grewia
- Species: G. flava

Binomial name
- Grewia flava DC.

Synonyms
- Grewia cana Sond.; Grewia hermannioides Harv.

= Grewia flava =

Species of flowering plant

Grewia flava, the brandy bush, wild currant, velvet raisin, or raisin tree, is a species of flowering plant in the family Malvaceae, native to southern Africa. A common shrub species, it is spreading into grasslands due to human rangeland management practices, and increasing rainfall. The berries, which are yellowish-brown and slightly lobed, are sweet and edible, but have little flesh and so are typically collected in large quantities to be eaten raw, dried or fermented into alcoholic beverages. The wood has a number of uses such as for making bows, knobkerries, traps and other tools. The desert truffle Kalaharituber pfeilii is often found in association with its roots.

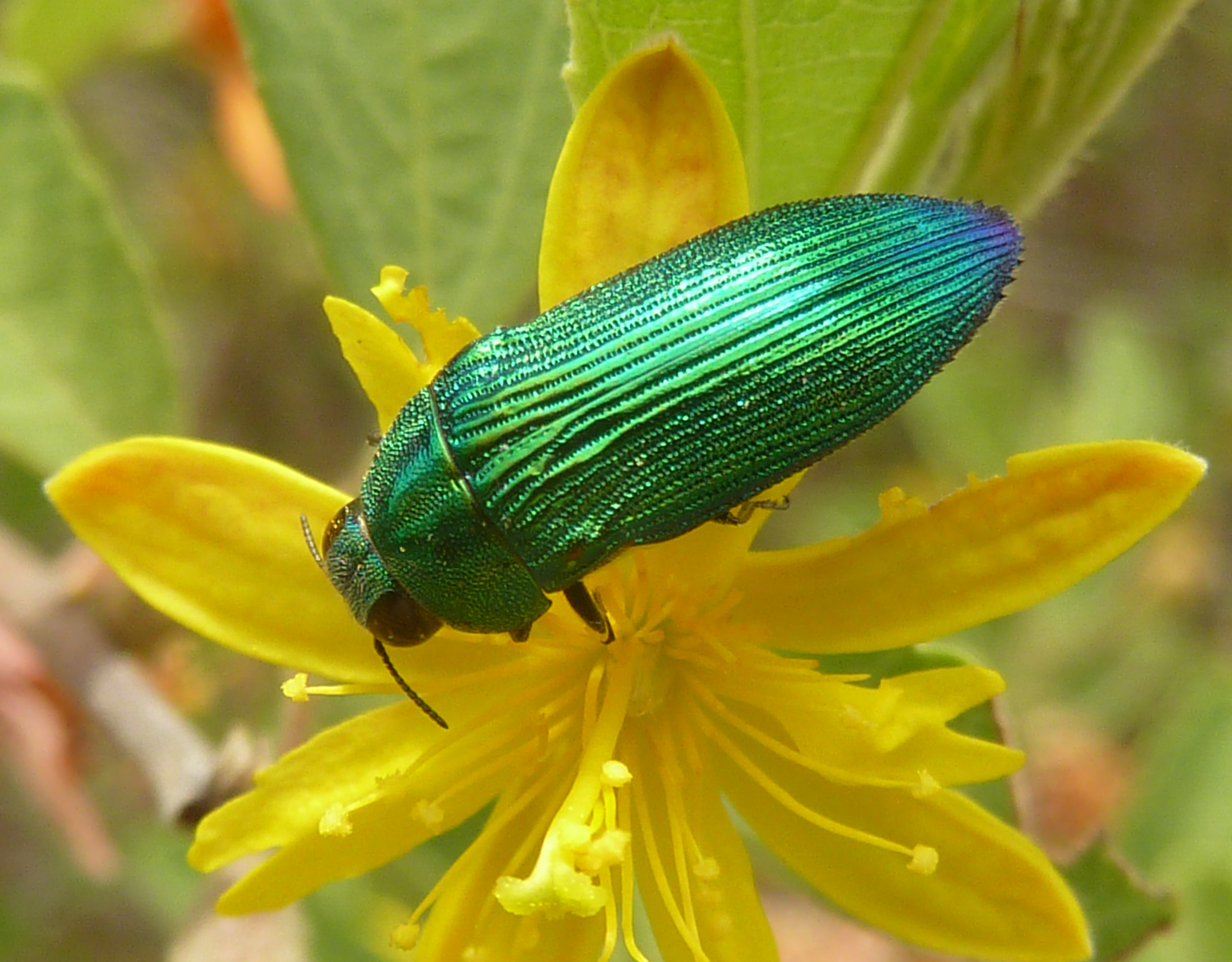
Female Acmaeodera viridaenea feeding on a flower

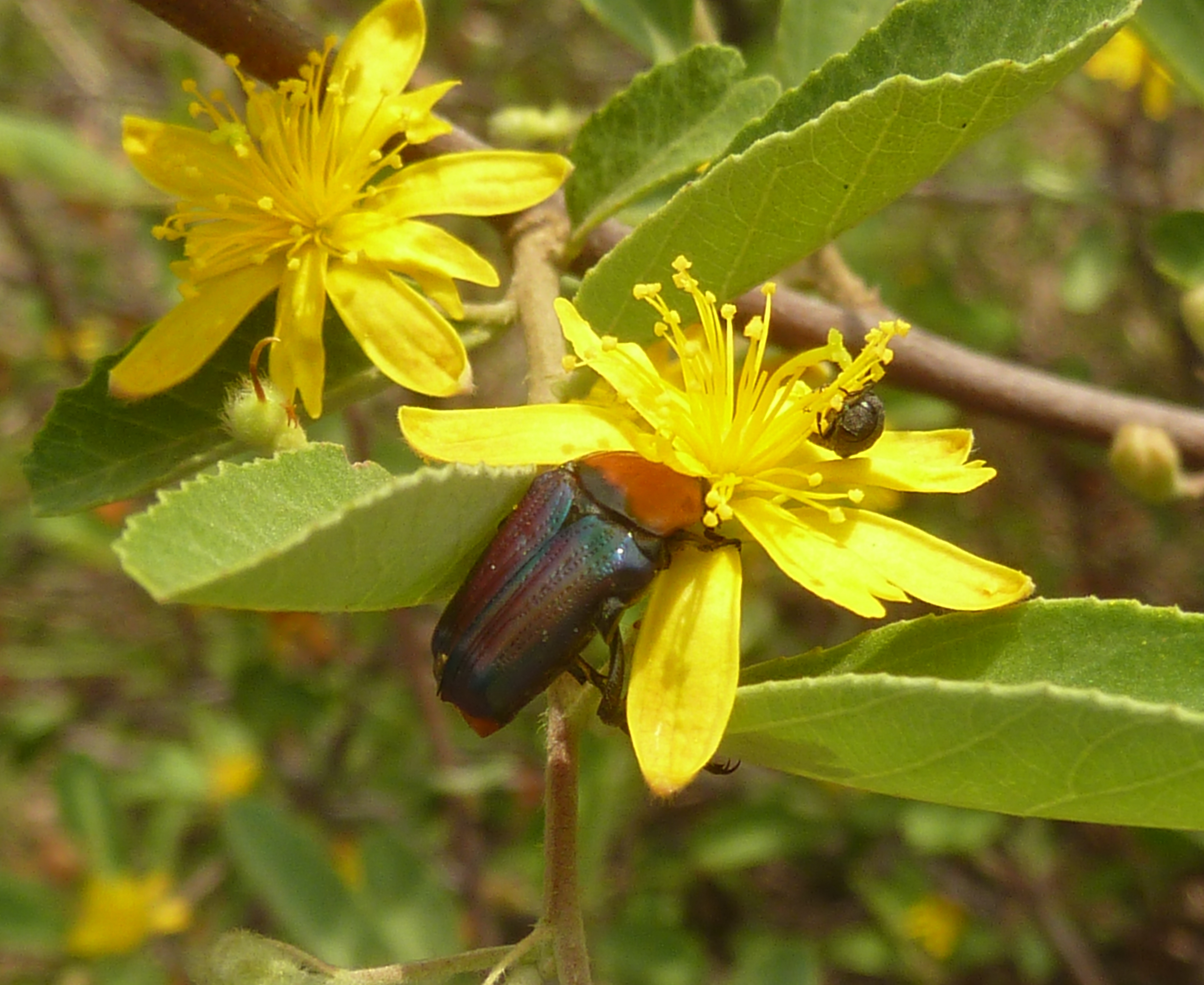
Leucocelis amethystina drinking nectar

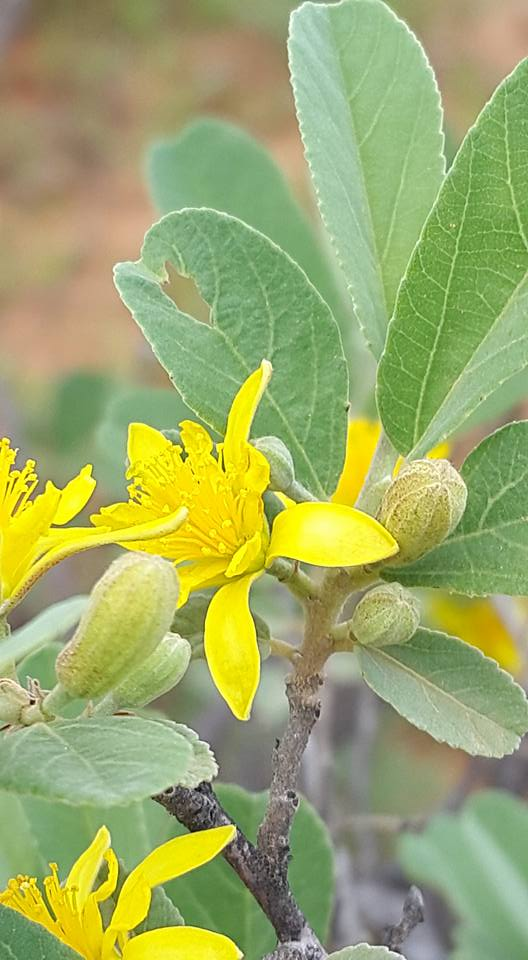
Close-up of flowers and flower buds

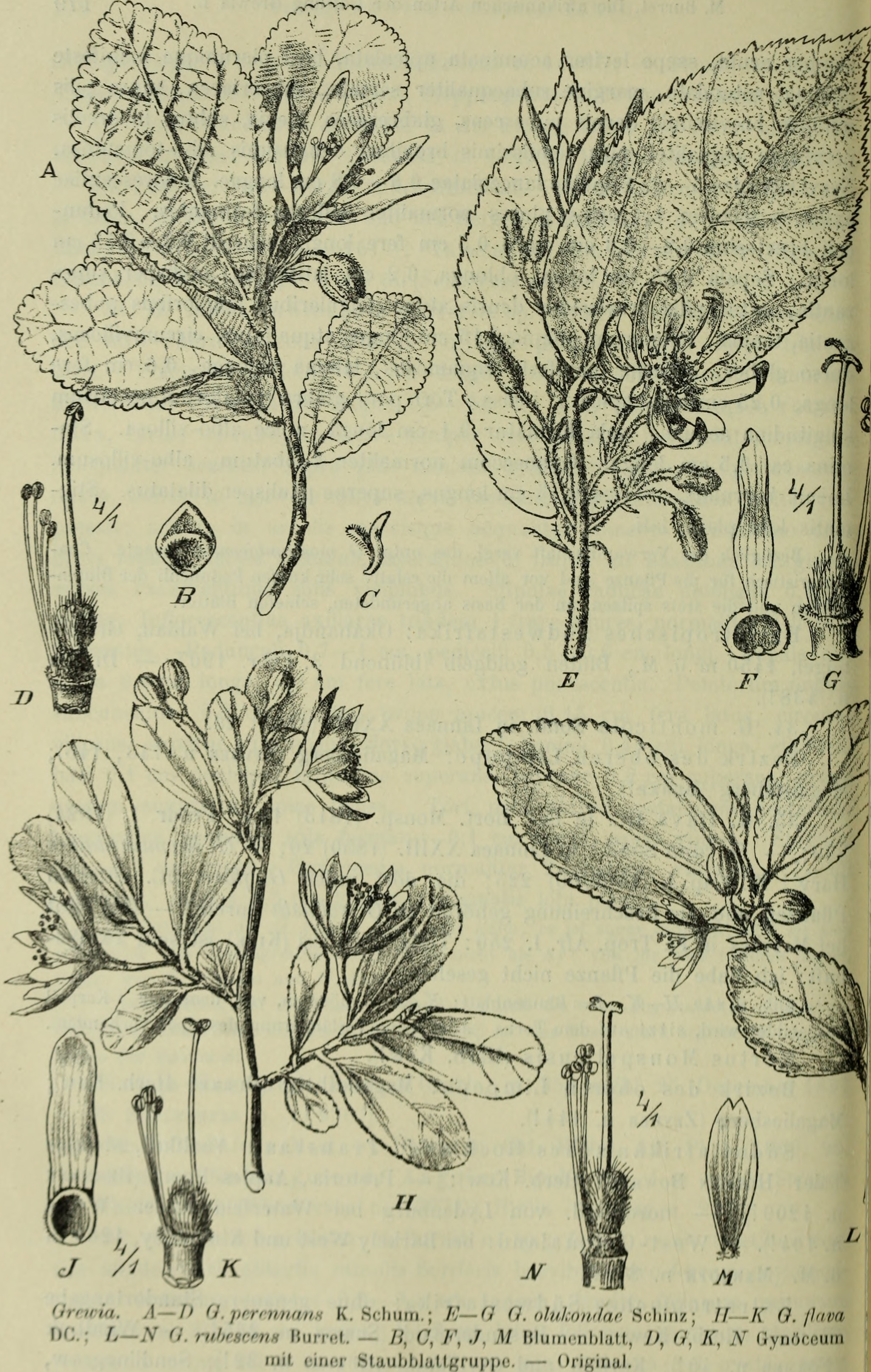
Botanical illustration
