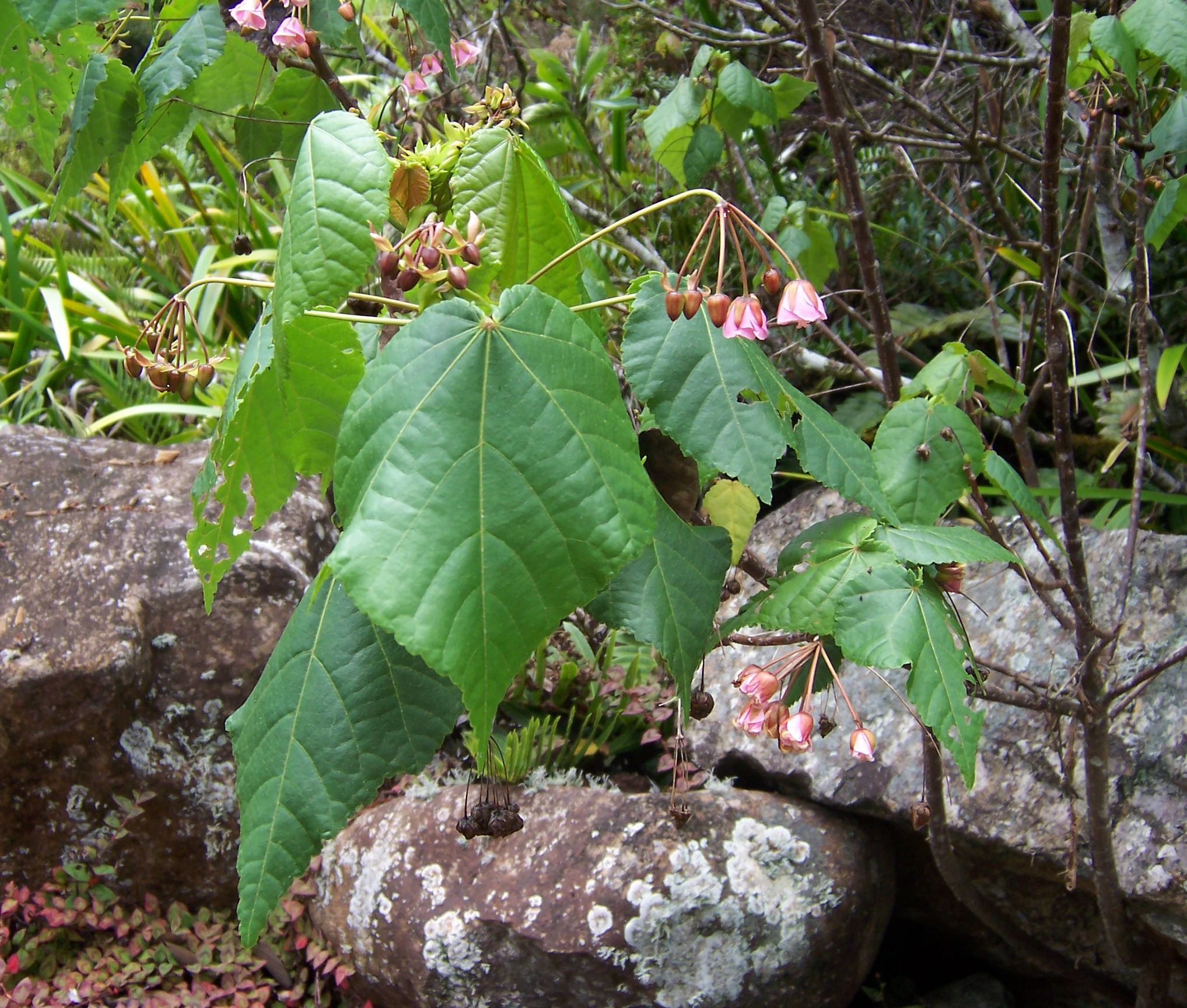

Scientific classification
- Kingdom: Plantae
- Clade: Tracheophytes
- Clade: Angiosperms
- Clade: Eudicots
- Clade: Rosids
- Order: Malvales
- Family: Malvaceae
- Genus: Dombeya
- Species: D. elegans

Binomial name
- Dombeya elegans Cordem.

= Dombeya elegans =

Species of flowering plant

Dombeya elegans is a species of plant in the family Malvaceae.

== Distribution ==
Dombeya elegans is found in La Réunion.
