= Friedmannodendron =

Conservation status
- Extinct in the Wild (IUCN 3.1)

Scientific classification
- Kingdom: Plantae
- Clade: Tracheophytes
- Clade: Angiosperms
- Clade: Eudicots
- Clade: Rosids
- Order: Malvales
- Family: Malvaceae
- Genus: Friedmannodendron; Le Péchon & Skema
- Species: F. rodriguesiana

Binomial name
- Friedmannodendron rodriguesiana (F.Friedmann) Le Péchon & Skema

Synonyms
- Dombeya rodriguesiana F.Friedmann

Genus of flowering plants

Friedmannodendron is a genus of flowering plants in the family Malvaceae. It includes a single species, Friedmannodendron rodriguesiana, a tree endemic to the island of Rodrigues.

The species was first described as Dombeya rodriguesiana by Francis Friedmann in 1981. In 2024 Timothée Le Péchon and Cynthia Skema placed the species in the new monotypic genus Friedmanniodendron as F. rodriguesiana.
