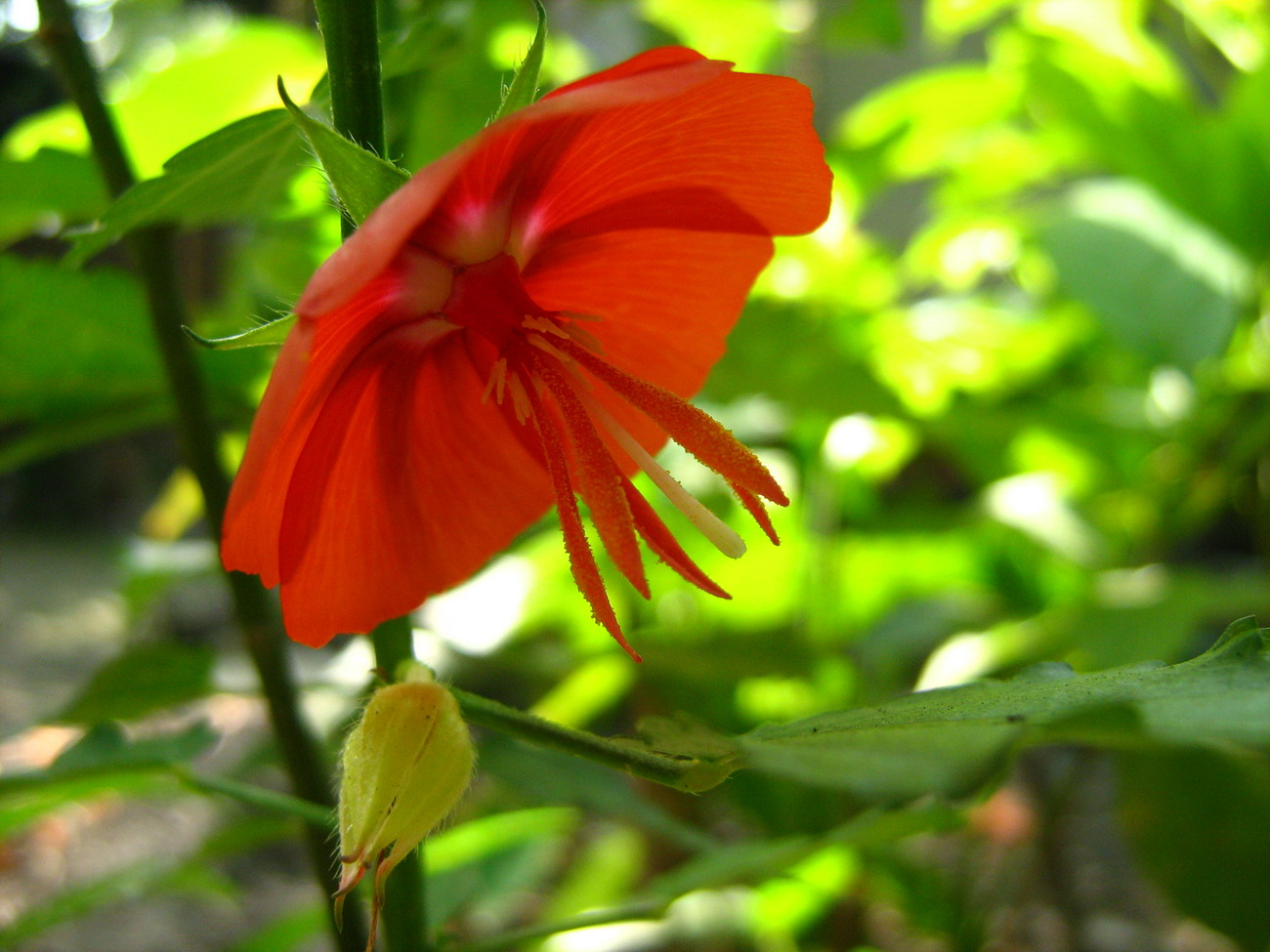
- Pentapetes phoenicea

Scientific classification
- Kingdom: Plantae
- Clade: Tracheophytes
- Clade: Angiosperms
- Clade: Eudicots
- Clade: Rosids
- Order: Malvales
- Family: Malvaceae
- Subfamily: Dombeyoideae
- Genus: Pentapetes; L.
- Species: P. phoenicea

Binomial name
- Pentapetes phoenicea L.

Synonyms
- Eriorhaphe Miq.; Moranda Scop.; Assonia phoenicea (L.) Raeusch.; Blattaria phoenicea Kuntze; Brotera phoenicea (L.) Cav.; Cavanilla phoenicea J.F.Gmel.; Dombeya phoenicea Cav.; Eriorhaphe phoenicea (L.) Bamps; Eriorhaphe punicea Miq.; Pentapetes angustifolia Blume; Pentapetes cebuana Blanco; Pentapetes coccinea Blanco

= Pentapetes =

Genus of flowering plants

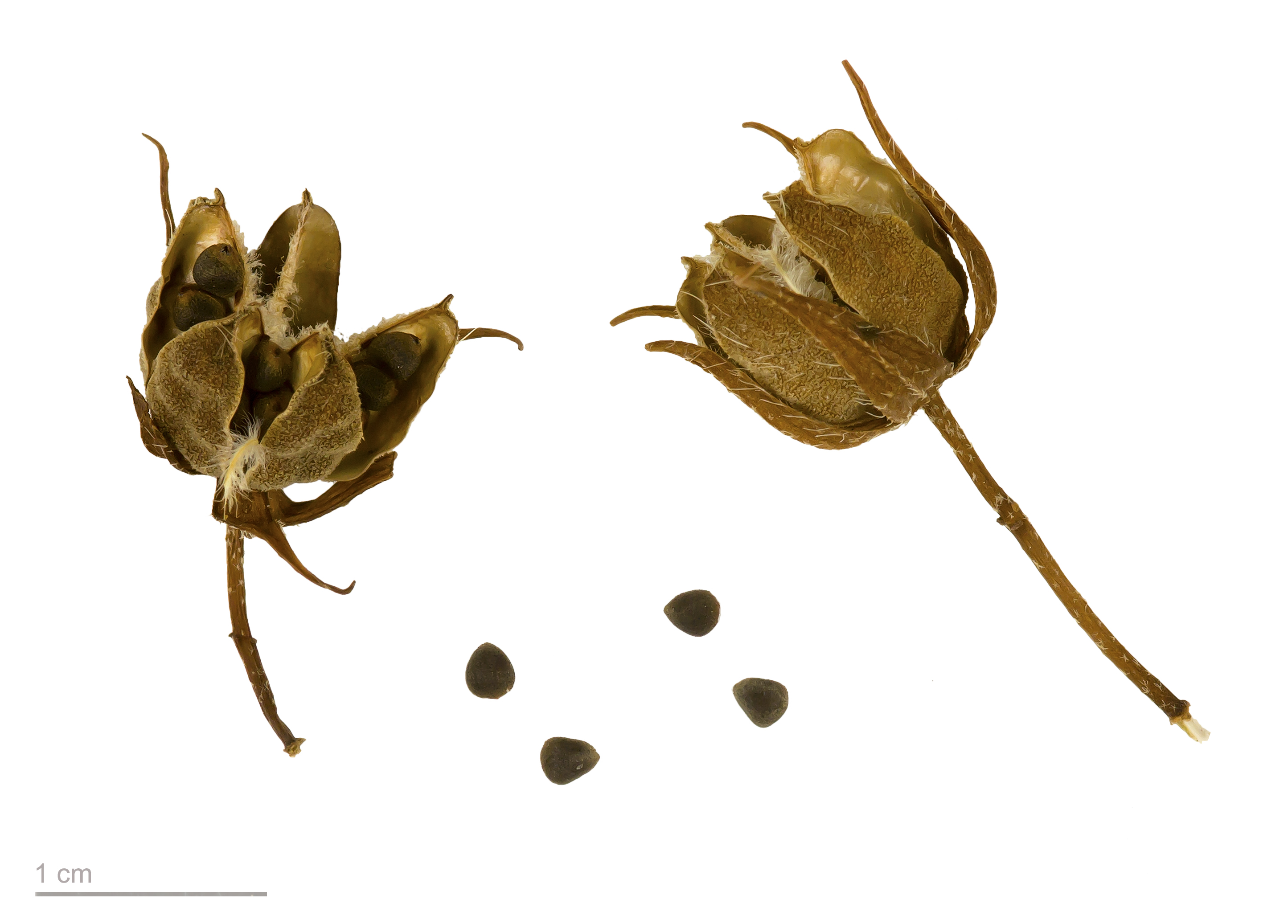
Pentapetes phoenicea fruit and seeds

Pentapetes is a genus of flowering plants in the family Malvaceae. It contains a single species, Pentapetes phoenicea. The plant is commonly known as noon flower, midday flower or scarlet mallow and occasionally cultivated. This is so named as the flowers open around noon, and closes around next day early morning.

The plant grows around 4–6 ft in height and the branches are long and spreading. Leaves are 6–10 cm in length, toothed at the margins, usually having a broad base and tapering to a pointed tip. Flowers are born in the axils of the leaves with 5 large deep red colored petals. The fruit is a 5-valved, rounded, hairy capsule, about 1 centimetre in diameter. The seeds, which are not winged, occur 8–12 in two series in each cell.

The flower is native to a wide region of tropical Asia, from India and Sri Lanka through Indochina to southern China, Peninsular Malaysia, the Philippines, and New Guinea.
