= List of butterflies of Zimbabwe =

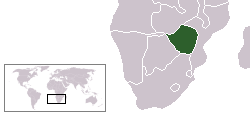
Location of Zimbabwe

This is a list of butterflies of Zimbabwe. About 527 species are known from Zimbabwe, 22 of which are endemic.

== Papilionidae ==
=== Papilioninae ===
==== Papilionini ====
- Papilio nireus lyaeus Doubleday, 1845
- Papilio dardanus cenea Stoll, 1790
- Papilio constantinus Ward, 1871
- Papilio demodocus Esper, [1798]
- Papilio echerioides chirindanus van Son, 1956
- Papilio ophidicephalus chirinda van Son, 1939

==== Leptocercini ====
- Graphium antheus (Cramer, 1779)
- Graphium policenes (Cramer, 1775)
- Graphium junodi (Trimen, 1893)
- Graphium colonna (Ward, 1873)
- Graphium porthaon (Hewitson, 1865)
- Graphium angolanus (Goeze, 1779)
- Graphium morania (Angas, 1849)
- Graphium leonidas (Fabricius, 1793)

== Pieridae ==
=== Coliadinae ===
- Eurema brigitta (Stoll, [1780])
- Eurema desjardinsii marshalli (Butler, 1898)
- Eurema regularis (Butler, 1876)
- Eurema hapale (Mabille, 1882)
- Eurema hecabe solifera (Butler, 1875)
- Catopsilia florella (Fabricius, 1775)
- Colias electo (Linnaeus, 1763)

=== Pierinae ===
- Colotis amata calais (Cramer, 1775)
- Colotis antevippe gavisa (Wallengren, 1857)
- Colotis auxo (Lucas, 1852)
- Colotis celimene amina (Hewitson, 1866)
- Colotis danae annae (Wallengren, 1857)
- Colotis dissociatus (Butler, 1897)
- Colotis euippe mediata Talbot, 1939
- Colotis euippe omphale (Godart, 1819)
- Colotis evagore antigone (Boisduval, 1836)
- Colotis evenina evenina (Wallengren, 1857)
- Colotis evenina casta (Gerstaecker, 1871)
- Colotis evenina sipylus (Swinhoe, 1884)
- Colotis ione (Godart, 1819)
- Colotis pallene (Hopffer, 1855)
- Colotis regina (Trimen, 1863)
- Colotis vesta argillaceus (Butler, 1877)
- Colotis vesta mutans (Butler, 1877)
- Colotis eris (Klug, 1829)
- Colotis subfasciatus (Swainson, 1833)
- Colotis agoye (Wallengren, 1857)
- Eronia leda (Boisduval, 1847)
- Pinacopterix eriphia (Godart, [1819])
- Nepheronia argia mhondana (Suffert, 1904)
- Nepheronia buquetii (Boisduval, 1836)
- Nepheronia thalassina sinalata (Suffert, 1904)
- Leptosia alcesta inalcesta Bernardi, 1959
- Leptosia nupta pseudonupta Bernardi, 1959

==== Pierini ====
- Appias epaphia contracta (Butler, 1888)
- Appias sabina phoebe (Butler, 1901)
- Pontia helice (Linnaeus, 1764)
- Mylothris agathina (Cramer, 1779)
- Mylothris carcassoni van Son, 1948 (endemic)
- Mylothris rubricosta attenuata Talbot, 1944
- Mylothris rueppellii haemus (Trimen, 1879)
- Mylothris sagala umtaliana d'Abrera, 1980
- Mylothris yulei Butler, 1897
- Dixeia doxo parva Talbot, 1943
- Dixeia leucophanes Vári, 1976
- Dixeia pigea (Boisduval, 1836)
- Dixeia spilleri (Spiller, 1884)
- Belenois aurota (Fabricius, 1793)
- Belenois creona severina (Stoll, 1781)
- Belenois gidica abyssinica (Lucas, 1852)
- Belenois thysa (Hopffer, 1855)
- Belenois zochalia (Boisduval, 1836)

== Lycaenidae ==
=== Miletinae ===
==== Liphyrini ====
- Aslauga atrophifurca Cottrell, 1981 (endemic)
- Aslauga marshalli Butler, 1899

==== Miletini ====
- Spalgis lemolea Druce, 1890
- Lachnocnema bibulus (Fabricius, 1793)
- Lachnocnema pseudobibulus Libert, 1996
- Lachnocnema durbani Trimen & Bowker, 1887
- Lachnocnema brimoides Libert, 1996
- Thestor basutus (Wallengren, 1857)

=== Poritiinae ===
==== Liptenini ====
- Alaena amazoula ochroma Vári, 1976
- Alaena nyassa Hewitson, 1877
- Pentila pauli obsoleta Hawker-Smith, 1933
- Pentila swynnertoni Stempffer & Bennett, 1961
- Pentila tropicalis fuscipunctata Henning & Henning, 1994
- Ornipholidotos peucetia (Hewitson, 1866)
- Cooksonia neavei rhodesiae Pinhey, 1962
- Mimacraea marshalli Trimen, 1898
- Mimacraea neokoton Druce, 1907 (endemic)
- Teriomima puellaris (Trimen, 1894)
- Baliochila barnesi Stempffer & Bennett, 1953
- Baliochila lipara Stempffer & Bennett, 1953
- Baliochila singularis Stempffer and Bennett, 1953
- Cnodontes pallida (Trimen, 1898)

==== Epitolini ====
- Deloneura sheppardi Stevenson, 1934
- Deloneura subfusca Hawker-Smith, 1933

=== Aphnaeinae ===
- Lipaphnaeus aderna spindasoides (Aurivillius, 1916)
- Chloroselas argentea Riley, 1932 (endemic)
- Chloroselas mazoensis (Trimen, 1898)
- Chloroselas pseudozeritis (Trimen, 1873)
- Crudaria leroma (Wallengren, 1857)
- Cigaritis brunnea (Jackson, 1966)
- Cigaritis ella (Hewitson, 1865)
- Cigaritis homeyeri (Dewitz, 1887)
- Cigaritis mozambica (Bertoloni, 1850)
- Cigaritis natalensis (Westwood, 1851)
- Cigaritis nyassae (Butler, 1884)
- Cigaritis phanes (Trimen, 1873)
- Cigaritis victoriae (Butler, 1884)
- Zeritis sorhagenii (Dewitz, 1879)
- Axiocerses tjoane (Wallengren, 1857)
- Axiocerses susanae Henning & Henning, 1996 (endemic)
- Axiocerses coalescens Henning & Henning, 1996
- Axiocerses amanga (Westwood, 1881)
- Axiocerses punicea cruenta (Trimen, 1894)
- Aloeides aranda (Wallengren, 1857)
- Aloeides trimeni Tite & Dickson, 1973
- Aloeides damarensis mashona Tite & Dickson, 1973
- Aloeides molomo coalescens Tite & Dickson, 1973
- Aloeides taikosama (Wallengren, 1857)
- Aloeides plowesi Tite & Dickson, 1973 (endemic)
- Aloeides mullini Henning & Henning, 1996 (endemic)
- Aphnaeus erikssoni barnesi Stempffer, 1954
- Aphnaeus erikssoni mashunae Stempffer, 1954
- Aphnaeus hutchinsonii Trimen & Bowker, 1887
- Aphnaeus marshalli Neave, 1910

=== Theclinae ===
- Myrina dermaptera nyassae Talbot, 1935
- Myrina silenus ficedula Trimen, 1879
- Hypolycaena buxtoni Hewitson, 1874
- Hypolycaena lochmophila Tite, 1967
- Hypolycaena philippus (Fabricius, 1793)
- Hypolycaena tearei Henning, 1981
- Hemiolaus caeculus (Hopffer, 1855)
- Leptomyrina hirundo (Wallengren, 1857)
- Leptomyrina gorgias sobrina Talbot, 1935
- Leptomyrina henningi Dickson, 1976
- Iolaus alienus Trimen, 1898
- Iolaus australis Stevenson, 1937
- Iolaus bakeri (Riley, 1928)
- Iolaus mimosae rhodosense (Stempffer & Bennett, 1959)
- Iolaus nasisii (Riley, 1928)
- Iolaus penningtoni (Stempffer & Bennett, 1959)
- Iolaus sidus Trimen, 1864
- Iolaus violacea (Riley, 1928)
- Iolaus pallene (Wallengren, 1857)
- Iolaus trimeni Wallengren, 1875
- Iolaus lalos (Druce, 1896)
- Iolaus silarus Druce, 1885
- Iolaus poultoni (Riley, 1928)
- Stugeta bowkeri tearei Dickson, 1980
- Pilodeudorix obscurata (Trimen, 1891)
- Pilodeudorix zeloides (Butler, 1901)
- Deudorix antalus (Hopffer, 1855)
- Deudorix caliginosa Lathy, 1903
- Deudorix dariaves Hewitson, 1877
- Deudorix dinochares Grose-Smith, 1887
- Deudorix dinomenes Grose-Smith, 1887
- Deudorix diocles Hewitson, 1869
- Deudorix lorisona coffea Jackson, 1966
- Deudorix magda Gifford, 1963
- Deudorix vansoni Pennington, 1948
- Capys connexivus Butler, 1897
- Capys disjunctus Trimen, 1895

=== Polyommatinae ===
==== Lycaenesthini ====
- Anthene amarah (Guérin-Méneville, 1849)
- Anthene arnoldi (Jones, 1918)
- Anthene barnesi Stevenson, 1940 (endemic)
- Anthene butleri livida (Trimen, 1881)
- Anthene chirinda (Bethune-Baker, 1910)
- Anthene contrastata mashuna (Stevenson, 1937)
- Anthene crawshayi (Butler, 1899)
- Anthene definita (Butler, 1899)
- Anthene irumu (Stempffer, 1948)
- Anthene kersteni (Gerstaecker, 1871)
- Anthene lasti (Grose-Smith & Kirby, 1894)
- Anthene lemnos (Hewitson, 1878)
- Anthene liodes (Hewitson, 1874)
- Anthene lunulata (Trimen, 1894)
- Anthene mpanda Kielland, 1990
- Anthene nigropunctata (Bethune-Baker, 1910)
- Anthene otacilia (Trimen, 1868)
- Anthene princeps (Butler, 1876)
- Anthene rhodesiana Stempffer, 1962
- Anthene sheppardi Stevenson, 1940
- Anthene talboti Stempffer, 1936
- Anthene wilsoni (Talbot, 1935)
- Anthene nigeriae (Aurivillius, 1905)

==== Polyommatini ====
- Cupidopsis cissus (Godart, [1824])
- Cupidopsis jobates (Hopffer, 1855)
- Pseudonacaduba sichela (Wallengren, 1857)
- Lampides boeticus (Linnaeus, 1767)
- Uranothauma antinorii felthami (Stevenson, 1934)
- Uranothauma falkensteini (Dewitz, 1879)
- Uranothauma nubifer (Trimen, 1895)
- Uranothauma poggei (Dewitz, 1879)
- Uranothauma vansomereni Stempffer, 1951
- Cacyreus lingeus (Stoll, 1782)
- Cacyreus marshalli Butler, 1898
- Cacyreus tespis (Herbst, 1804)
- Cacyreus virilis Stempffer, 1936
- Harpendyreus notoba (Trimen, 1868)
- Leptotes babaulti (Stempffer, 1935)
- Leptotes brevidentatus (Tite, 1958)
- Leptotes jeanneli (Stempffer, 1935)
- Leptotes pirithous (Linnaeus, 1767)
- Leptotes pulchra (Murray, 1874)
- Tuxentius calice (Hopffer, 1855)
- Tuxentius melaena (Trimen & Bowker, 1887)
- Tarucus sybaris (Hopffer, 1855)
- Zintha hintza (Trimen, 1864)
- Zizeeria knysna (Trimen, 1862)
- Zizina antanossa (Mabille, 1877)
- Actizera lucida (Trimen, 1883)
- Zizula hylax (Fabricius, 1775)
- Brephidium metophis (Wallengren, 1860)
- Oraidium barberae (Trimen, 1868)
- Azanus jesous (Guérin-Méneville, 1849)
- Azanus mirza (Plötz, 1880)
- Azanus moriqua (Wallengren, 1857)
- Azanus natalensis (Trimen & Bowker, 1887)
- Azanus ubaldus (Stoll, 1782)
- Eicochrysops eicotrochilus Bethune-Baker, 1924
- Eicochrysops hippocrates (Fabricius, 1793)
- Eicochrysops messapus mahallakoaena (Wallengren, 1857)
- Euchrysops barkeri (Trimen, 1893)
- Euchrysops dolorosa (Trimen & Bowker, 1887)
- Euchrysops malathana (Boisduval, 1833)
- Euchrysops osiris (Hopffer, 1855)
- Euchrysops subpallida Bethune-Baker, 1923
- Thermoniphas colorata (Ungemach, 1932)
- Oboronia bueronica Karsch, 1895
- Freyeria trochylus (Freyer, [1843])
- Lepidochrysops barnesi Pennington, 1953 (endemic)
- Lepidochrysops chittyi Henning & Henning, 1994 (endemic)
- Lepidochrysops chloauges (Bethune-Baker, [1923])
- Lepidochrysops coxii (Pinhey, 1945) (endemic)
- Lepidochrysops glauca glauca (Trimen & Bowker, 1887)
- Lepidochrysops glauca swinburnei Stevenson, 1939
- Lepidochrysops inyangae (Pinhey, 1945)
- Lepidochrysops kocak Seven, 1997
- Lepidochrysops letsea (Trimen, 1870)
- Lepidochrysops longifalces Tite, 1961
- Lepidochrysops mashuna (Trimen, 1894) (endemic)
- Lepidochrysops patricia (Trimen & Bowker, 1887)
- Lepidochrysops peculiaris hypoleucus (Butler, 1893)
- Lepidochrysops plebeia (Butler, 1898)
- Lepidochrysops ruthica Pennington, 1953 (endemic)
- Lepidochrysops solwezii (Bethune-Baker, [1923])
- Lepidochrysops vansoni (Swanepoel, 1949)
- Lepidochrysops variabilis Cottrell, 1965
- Lepidochrysops violetta (Pinhey, 1945) (endemic)

== Nymphalidae ==
=== Libytheinae ===
- Libythea labdaca laius Trimen, 1879

=== Danainae ===
==== Danaini ====
- Danaus chrysippus orientis (Aurivillius, 1909)
- Tirumala petiverana (Doubleday, 1847)
- Amauris niavius dominicanus Trimen, 1879
- Amauris albimaculata chirindana Talbot, 1941
- Amauris echeria lobengula (Sharpe, 1890)
- Amauris ochlea (Boisduval, 1847)

=== Satyrinae ===
==== Melanitini ====
- Aeropetes tulbaghia (Linnaeus, 1764)
- Gnophodes betsimena diversa (Butler, 1880)
- Melanitis leda (Linnaeus, 1758)
- Melanitis libya Distant, 1882
- Aphysoneura pigmentaria vumba Kielland, 1989

==== Satyrini ====
- Bicyclus angulosa selousi (Trimen, 1895)
- Bicyclus anynana (Butler, 1879)
- Bicyclus campina (Aurivillius, 1901)
- Bicyclus condamini van Son, 1963 (endemic)
- Bicyclus cooksoni (Druce, 1905)
- Bicyclus cottrelli (van Son, 1952)
- Bicyclus ena (Hewitson, 1877)
- Bicyclus safitza (Westwood, 1850)
- Heteropsis perspicua (Trimen, 1873)
- Heteropsis simonsii (Butler, 1877)
- Ypthima antennata van Son, 1955
- Ypthima asterope (Klug, 1832)
- Ypthima condamini Kielland, 1982
- Ypthima granulosa Butler, 1883
- Ypthima impura paupera Ungemach, 1932
- Ypthima pupillaris Butler, 1888
- Ypthima rhodesiana Carcasson, 1961
- Ypthimomorpha itonia (Hewitson, 1865)
- Mashuna mashuna (Trimen, 1895) (endemic)
- Coenyropsis bera (Hewitson, 1877)
- Coenyropsis natalii (Boisduval, 1847)
- Physcaeneura panda (Boisduval, 1847)
- Physcaeneura pione Godman, 1880
- Neita extensa (Butler, 1898)
- Pseudonympha cyclops van Son, 1955
- Pseudonympha arnoldi van Son, 1941 (endemic)
- Paternympha loxophthalma (Vári, 1971)
- Stygionympha wichgrafi lannini van Son, 1966

=== Charaxinae ===
==== Charaxini ====
- Charaxes varanes vologeses (Mabille, 1876)
- Charaxes acuminatus vumba van Someren, 1963
- Charaxes candiope (Godart, 1824)
- Charaxes protoclea azota (Hewitson, 1877)
- Charaxes macclounii Butler, 1895
- Charaxes jasius saturnus Butler, 1866
- Charaxes castor flavifasciatus Butler, 1895
- Charaxes brutus natalensis Staudinger, 1885
- Charaxes pollux gazanus van Someren, 1967
- Charaxes druceanus proximans Joicey & Talbot, 1922
- Charaxes druceanus stevensoni van Someren, 1963
- Charaxes bohemani Felder & Felder, 1859
- Charaxes xiphares vumbui van Son, 1936
- Charaxes cithaeron cithaeron Felder & Felder, 1859
- Charaxes cithaeron joanae van Someren, 1964
- Charaxes violetta melloni Fox, 1963
- Charaxes etesipe tavetensis Rothschild, 1894
- Charaxes penricei Rothschild, 1900
- Charaxes achaemenes Felder & Felder, 1867
- Charaxes jahlusa argynnides Westwood, 1864
- Charaxes jahlusa rex Henning, 1978
- Charaxes baumanni selousi Trimen, 1894
- Charaxes pseudophaeus van Someren, 1975
- Charaxes manica Trimen, 1894
- Charaxes fulgurata Aurivillius, 1899
- Charaxes phaeus Hewitson, 1877
- Charaxes vansoni van Someren, 1975
- Charaxes gallagheri van Son, 1962
- Charaxes guderiana (Dewitz, 1879)
- Charaxes zoolina (Westwood, [1850])
- Charaxes nichetes leoninus Butler, 1895
- Charaxes zambeziensis Henning & Henning, 1994 (endemic)
- Charaxes alpinus van Someren & Jackson, 1957 (endemic)

==== Euxanthini ====
- Charaxes wakefieldi (Ward, 1873)

=== Apaturinae ===
- Apaturopsis cleochares schultzei Schmidt, 1921

=== Nymphalinae ===
==== Nymphalini ====
- Antanartia schaeneia dubia Howarth, 1966
- Vanessa dimorphica (Howarth, 1966)
- Vanessa cardui (Linnaeus, 1758)
- Junonia artaxia Hewitson, 1864
- Junonia hierta cebrene Trimen, 1870
- Junonia natalica (Felder & Felder, 1860)
- Junonia oenone (Linnaeus, 1758)
- Junonia orithya madagascariensis Guenée, 1865
- Junonia terea elgiva Hewitson, 1864
- Junonia touhilimasa Vuillot, 1892
- Salamis cacta eileenae Henning & Joannou, 1994
- Protogoniomorpha anacardii nebulosa (Trimen, 1881)
- Protogoniomorpha parhassus (Drury, 1782)
- Precis actia Distant, 1880
- Precis antilope (Feisthamel, 1850)
- Precis archesia (Cramer, 1779)
- Precis ceryne (Boisduval, 1847)
- Precis cuama (Hewitson, 1864)
- Precis octavia sesamus Trimen, 1883
- Precis tugela Trimen, 1879
- Hypolimnas anthedon wahlbergi (Wallengren, 1857)
- Hypolimnas deceptor (Trimen, 1873)
- Hypolimnas misippus (Linnaeus, 1764)
- Catacroptera cloanthe (Stoll, 1781)

=== Cyrestinae ===
==== Cyrestini ====
- Cyrestis camillus sublineata Lathy, 1901

=== Biblidinae ===
==== Biblidini ====
- Byblia anvatara acheloia (Wallengren, 1857)
- Byblia ilithyia (Drury, 1773)
- Neptidopsis ophione nucleata Grünberg, 1911
- Eurytela dryope angulata Aurivillius, 1899
- Eurytela hiarbas lita Rothschild & Jordan, 1903

==== Epicaliini ====
- Sevenia boisduvali (Wallengren, 1857)
- Sevenia morantii (Trimen, 1881)
- Sevenia natalensis (Boisduval, 1847)
- Sevenia rosa (Hewitson, 1877)

=== Limenitinae ===
==== Limenitidini ====
- Cymothoe alcimeda rhodesiae Stevenson, 1934
- Cymothoe coranus Grose-Smith, 1889
- Cymothoe vumbui Bethune-Baker, 1926
- Pseudacraea boisduvalii trimenii Butler, 1874
- Pseudacraea lucretia expansa (Butler, 1878)

==== Neptidini ====
- Neptis alta Overlaet, 1955
- Neptis carcassoni Van Son, 1959
- Neptis goochii Trimen, 1879
- Neptis jordani Neave, 1910
- Neptis kiriakoffi Overlaet, 1955
- Neptis laeta Overlaet, 1955
- Neptis penningtoni van Son, 1977
- Neptis saclava marpessa Hopffer, 1855
- Neptis serena Overlaet, 1955
- Neptis swynnertoni Trimen, 1912
- Neptis trigonophora Butler, 1878

==== Adoliadini ====
- Euryphura achlys (Hopffer, 1855)
- Euryphura concordia (Hopffer, 1855)
- Hamanumida daedalus (Fabricius, 1775)
- Pseudargynnis hegemone (Godart, 1819)
- Aterica galene theophane Hopffer, 1855
- Bebearia orientis malawiensis Holmes, 2001
- Euphaedra orientalis Rothschild, 1898
- Euphaedra neophron (Hopffer, 1855)

=== Heliconiinae ===
==== Acraeini ====
- Acraea cerasa Hewitson, 1861
- Acraea acara Hewitson, 1865
- Acraea anemosa Hewitson, 1865
- Acraea boopis Wichgraf, 1914
- Acraea cuva Grose-Smith, 1889
- Acraea horta (Linnaeus, 1764)
- Acraea insignis gorongozae van Son, 1963
- Acraea machequena Grose-Smith, 1887
- Acraea neobule Doubleday, 1847
- Acraea rabbaiae perlucida Henning & Henning, 1996
- Acraea satis Ward, 1871
- Acraea acrita Hewitson, 1865
- Acraea asema Hewitson, 1877
- Acraea atolmis Westwood, 1881
- Acraea egina areca Mabille, 1889
- Acraea nohara nohara Boisduval, 1847
- Acraea nohara halali Marshall, 1896
- Acraea petraea Boisduval, 1847
- Acraea pseudatolmis Eltringham, 1912 (endemic)
- Acraea violarum Boisduval, 1847
- Acraea aglaonice Westwood, 1881
- Acraea atergatis Westwood, 1881
- Acraea axina Westwood, 1881
- Acraea caldarena Hewitson, 1877
- Acraea lygus Druce, 1875
- Acraea natalica Boisduval, 1847
- Acraea oncaea Hopffer, 1855
- Acraea stenobea Wallengren, 1860
- Acraea aganice Hewitson, 1852
- Acraea acerata Hewitson, 1874
- Acraea cabira Hopffer, 1855
- Acraea encedon (Linnaeus, 1758)
- Acraea serena (Fabricius, 1775)
- Acraea esebria Hewitson, 1861
- Acraea goetzei Thurau, 1903
- Acraea johnstoni Godman, 1885
- Acraea burni Butler, 1896
- Acraea pentapolis epidica Oberthür, 1893
- Acraea anacreon Trimen, 1868
- Acraea bomba Grose-Smith, 1889
- Acraea induna Trimen, 1895
- Acraea parei (Henning & Henning, 1996)
- Acraea rahira Boisduval, 1833
- Acraea igola Trimen & Bowker, 1889
- Acraea vumbui Stevenson, 1934 (endemic)
- Pardopsis punctatissima (Boisduval, 1833)

==== Argynnini ====
- Issoria smaragdifera (Butler, 1895)

==== Vagrantini ====
- Lachnoptera ayresii Trimen, 1879
- Phalanta eurytis (Doubleday, 1847)
- Phalanta phalantha aethiopica (Rothschild & Jordan, 1903)

== Hesperiidae ==
=== Coeliadinae ===
- Coeliades anchises (Gerstaecker, 1871)
- Coeliades forestan (Stoll, [1782])
- Coeliades libeon (Druce, 1875)
- Coeliades pisistratus (Fabricius, 1793)
- Coeliades sejuncta (Mabille & Vuillot, 1891)

=== Pyrginae ===
==== Celaenorrhinini ====
- Celaenorrhinus bettoni Butler, 1902
- Celaenorrhinus galenus biseriata (Butler, 1888)
- Eretis djaelaelae (Wallengren, 1857)
- Eretis melania Mabille, 1891
- Eretis umbra nox (Neave, 1910)
- Sarangesa astrigera Butler, 1894
- Sarangesa laelius (Mabille, 1877)
- Sarangesa lucidella (Mabille, 1891)
- Sarangesa maculata (Mabille, 1891)
- Sarangesa motozi (Wallengren, 1857)
- Sarangesa phidyle (Walker, 1870)
- Sarangesa ruona Evans, 1937
- Sarangesa seineri Strand, 1909

==== Tagiadini ====
- Tagiades flesus (Fabricius, 1781)
- Eagris nottoana (Wallengren, 1857)
- Calleagris jamesoni (Sharpe, 1890)
- Caprona pillaana Wallengren, 1857
- Netrobalane canopus (Trimen, 1864)
- Leucochitonea levubu Wallengren, 1857
- Abantis bamptoni Collins & Larsen, 1994
- Abantis paradisea (Butler, 1870)
- Abantis tettensis Hopffer, 1855
- Abantis venosa Trimen & Bowker, 1889
- Abantis zambesiaca (Westwood, 1874)

==== Carcharodini ====
- Spialia asterodia (Trimen, 1864)
- Spialia colotes transvaaliae (Trimen & Bowker, 1889)
- Spialia confusa Evans, 1937
- Spialia delagoae (Trimen, 1898)
- Spialia depauperata australis de Jong, 1978
- Spialia diomus ferax (Wallengren, 1863)
- Spialia dromus (Plötz, 1884)
- Spialia mafa (Trimen, 1870)
- Spialia paula (Higgins, 1924)
- Spialia secessus (Trimen, 1891)
- Spialia spio (Linnaeus, 1764)
- Gomalia elma (Trimen, 1862)

=== Hesperiinae ===
==== Aeromachini ====
- Astictopterus stellata mineni (Trimen, 1894)
- Ampittia capenas (Hewitson, 1868)
- Kedestes barberae (Trimen, 1873)
- Kedestes callicles (Hewitson, 1868)
- Kedestes lema linka Evans, 1956
- Kedestes macomo (Trimen, 1862)
- Kedestes marshalli Aurivillius, 1925 (endemic)
- Kedestes michaeli Gardiner & Hancock, 1982
- Kedestes mohozutza (Wallengren, 1857)
- Kedestes monostichus Hancock & Gardiner, 1982
- Kedestes nerva paola Plötz, 1884
- Kedestes wallengrenii (Trimen, 1883)
- Gorgyra johnstoni (Butler, 1894)
- Teniorhinus harona (Westwood, 1881)
- Teniorhinus herilus (Hopffer, 1855)
- Xanthodisca vibius (Hewitson, 1878)
- Acada biseriata (Mabille, 1893)
- Parosmodes morantii (Trimen, 1873)
- Acleros mackenii (Trimen, 1868)
- Acleros ploetzi Mabille, 1890
- Semalea pulvina (Plötz, 1879)
- Andronymus caesar philander (Hopffer, 1855)
- Andronymus neander (Plötz, 1884)
- Chondrolepis niveicornis (Plötz, 1883)
- Zophopetes dysmephila (Trimen, 1868)
- Artitropa erinnys nyasae Riley, 1925
- Artitropa reducta Aurivillius, 1925
- Fresna nyassae (Hewitson, 1878)
- Platylesches affinissima Strand, 1921
- Platylesches galesa (Hewitson, 1877)
- Platylesches langa Evans, 1937
- Platylesches moritili (Wallengren, 1857)
- Platylesches neba (Hewitson, 1877)
- Platylesches picanini (Holland, 1894)
- Platylesches robustus Neave, 1910
- Platylesches shona Evans, 1937
- Platylesches tina Evans, 1937

==== Baorini ====
- Zenonia zeno (Trimen, 1864)
- Pelopidas mathias (Fabricius, 1798)
- Pelopidas thrax (Hübner, 1821)
- Borbo borbonica (Boisduval, 1833)
- Borbo chagwa (Evans, 1937)
- Borbo detecta (Trimen, 1893)
- Borbo fallax (Gaede, 1916)
- Borbo fanta (Evans, 1937)
- Borbo fatuellus (Hopffer, 1855)
- Borbo ferruginea dondo Evans, 1956
- Borbo gemella (Mabille, 1884)
- Borbo holtzi (Plötz, 1883)
- Borbo lugens (Hopffer, 1855)
- Borbo micans (Holland, 1896)
- Parnara monasi (Trimen & Bowker, 1889)
- Gegenes hottentota (Latreille, 1824)
- Gegenes niso (Linnaeus, 1764)
- Gegenes pumilio gambica (Mabille, 1878)

=== Heteropterinae ===
- Metisella abdeli (Krüger, 1928)
- Metisella aegipan inyanga Evans, 1956
- Metisella metis paris Evans, 1937
- Metisella willemi (Wallengren, 1857)
- Tsitana tsita (Trimen, 1870)

== See also ==
- List of moths of Zimbabwe
- Wildlife of Zimbabwe
