= Lepidochrysops rossouwi =

Conservation status
- Least Concern (IUCN 3.1)

Scientific classification
- Kingdom: Animalia
- Phylum: Arthropoda
- Class: Insecta
- Order: Lepidoptera
- Family: Lycaenidae
- Genus: Lepidochrysops
- Species: L. rossouwi

Binomial name
- Lepidochrysops rossouwi Henning & Henning, 1994

Species of butterfly

Lepidochrysops glauca, the Rossouw's blue, is a butterfly of the family Lycaenidae. It is found in South Africa, where it is restricted to grassy escarpments near the Stoffberg, Dullstroom and Lydenburg in Mpumalanga.

The wingspan is 33–43 mm for males and 42–50 mm for females. Adults are on wing from October to December and from January to March. There are two generations per year.

The larvae feed on Lantana rugosa. Third and later instar larvae feed on the brood of Camponotus maculatus ants.
