= Spialia agylla =

Scientific classification
- Kingdom: Animalia
- Phylum: Arthropoda
- Clade: Pancrustacea
- Class: Insecta
- Order: Lepidoptera
- Family: Hesperiidae
- Genus: Spialia
- Species: S. agylla

Binomial name
- Spialia agylla (Trimen, 1889)

Synonyms
- Pyrgus agylla Trimen, 1889; Syrichtus agylla

Species of butterfly

Spialia agylla, the grassveld sandman, is a butterfly of the family Hesperiidae. It is found in South Africa.

The wingspan is 20–22 mm for males and 22–24 mm for females. Adults are on wing from August to April with peaks in midsummer. There are several generations per year.

The larvae feed on Hermannia species and Pavonia burchelli.

== Subspecies ==
- Spialia agylla agylla (western Cape to the southern part of the northern Cape, across the western part of the eastern Cape to the Orange Free State, eastern Lesotho, southern Gauteng, south-western Mpumalanga and the arid savanna in the North West Province)
- Spialia agylla bamptoni Vári, 1976 (around the coastal border of the western Cape and Namaqualand in the northern Cape)
