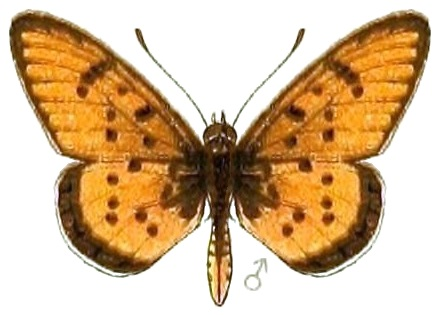
- Acraea axina in Seitz (1925)

Conservation status
- Least Concern (IUCN 3.1)

Scientific classification
- Kingdom: Animalia
- Phylum: Arthropoda
- Class: Insecta
- Order: Lepidoptera
- Family: Nymphalidae
- Genus: Acraea
- Species: A. axina

Binomial name
- Acraea axina Westwood, 1881

Synonyms
- Acraea axina f. illuminata van Son, 1963

= Acraea axina =

Little acraea

Species of butterfly

Acraea axina, the little acraea, is a butterfly of the family Nymphalidae. It is found in south-west Africa, in KwaZulu-Natal, Zimbabwe, Mozambique, Transvaal, Botswana, and Malawi.

== Description ==
The wingspan is 35–40 mm for males and 36–44 mm for females. A. axina Westw. (55 e) is a small species, only measuring 30 to 50 mm., and recalls oncaea and in many respects also doubledayi; the wings above have the ground-colour reddish-yellow or grey-yellow, at the base, especially on the hind wing, blackish; fore wing at the apex and distal margin narrowly black with black veins and short black streaks on the folds in 3 to 5; marginal band of the hindwing above deep black, unspotted, 1 mm. in breadth, beneath with semicircular whitish marginal spots; wings beneath light yellowish with orange- yellow or reddish spots; beyond discal dots 4 to 6 on the forewing the ground-colour is usually somewhat lighter. Angola and Damaraland to Rhodesia and Nyassaland.

== Taxonomy ==
It is a member of the Acraea caecilia species group. See also Pierre & Bernaud, 2014.

== Biology ==
Adults are on wing year round, with a peak from September to May. There are multiple generations per year.
