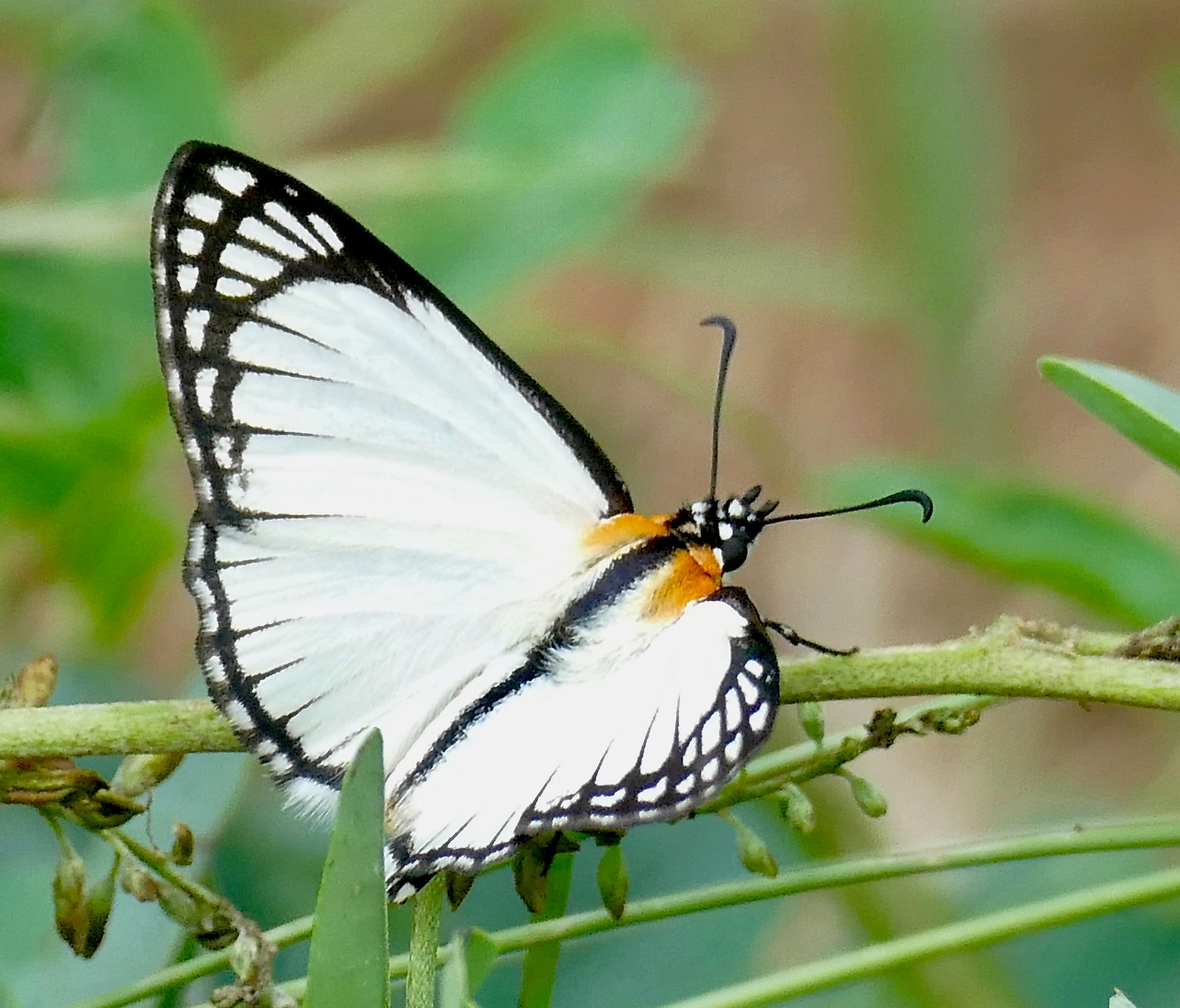
- Perched imago in Kruger National Park

Scientific classification
- Kingdom: Animalia
- Phylum: Arthropoda
- Class: Insecta
- Order: Lepidoptera
- Family: Hesperiidae
- Genus: Abantis
- Species: A. levubu

Binomial name
- Abantis levubu Wallengren, 1857

Synonyms
- Sapaea lactea Plötz, 1885; Abantis levebu f. defecta Aurivillius, 1925

= Leucochitonea levubu =

White-cloaked skipper

Species of butterfly

Leucochitonea levubu, the white-cloaked skipper, is a butterfly of the family Hesperiidae. It is found from Botswana to the former Transvaal and to Zimbabwe. The habitat consists of dry savanna.

The wingspan is 30–40 mm for males and 35–45 mm for females. Adults are on the wing from November to April (with a peak from January to February). There is one extended generation per year.

The larvae feed on Grewia flava.

== Gallery ==
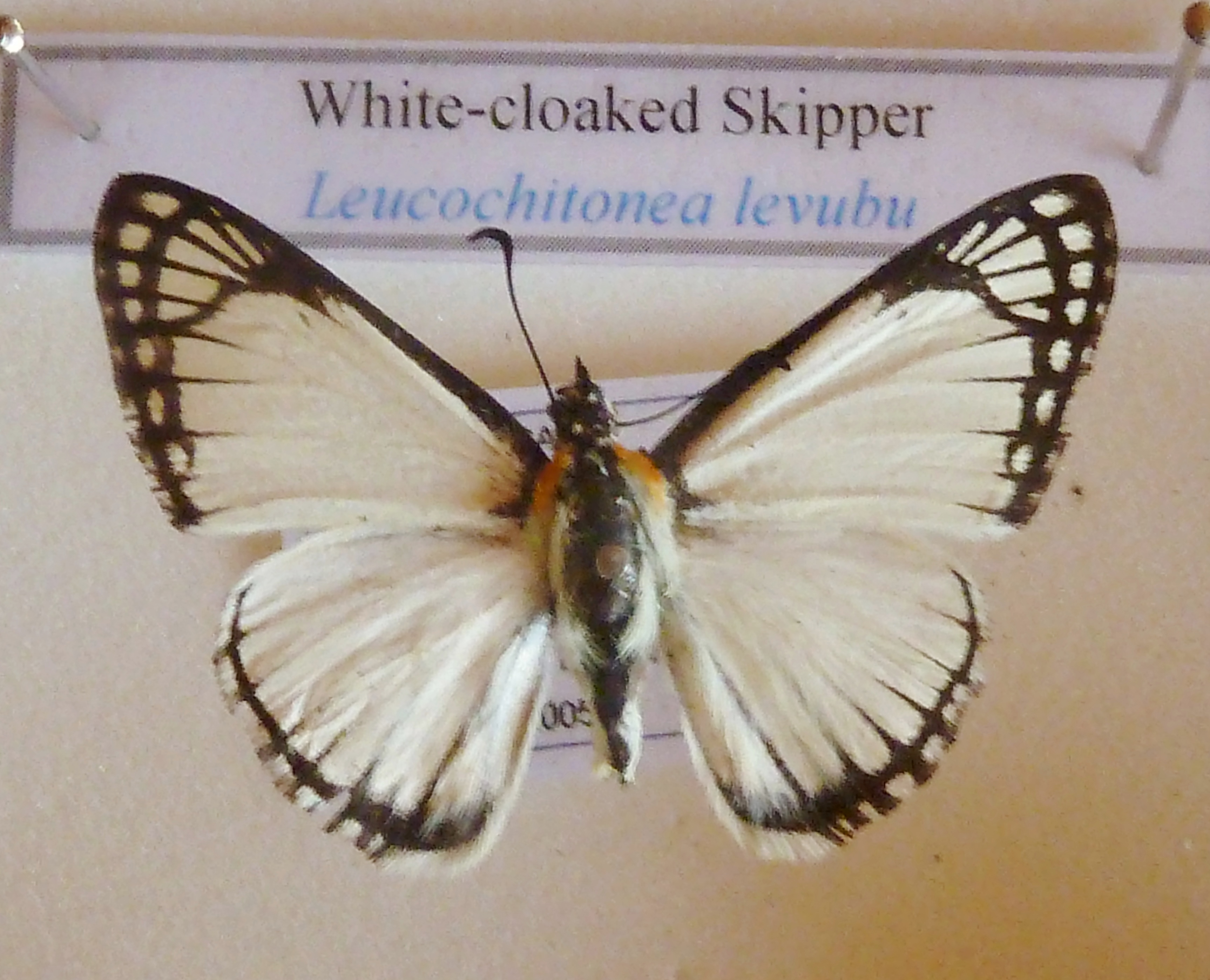
Imago specimen

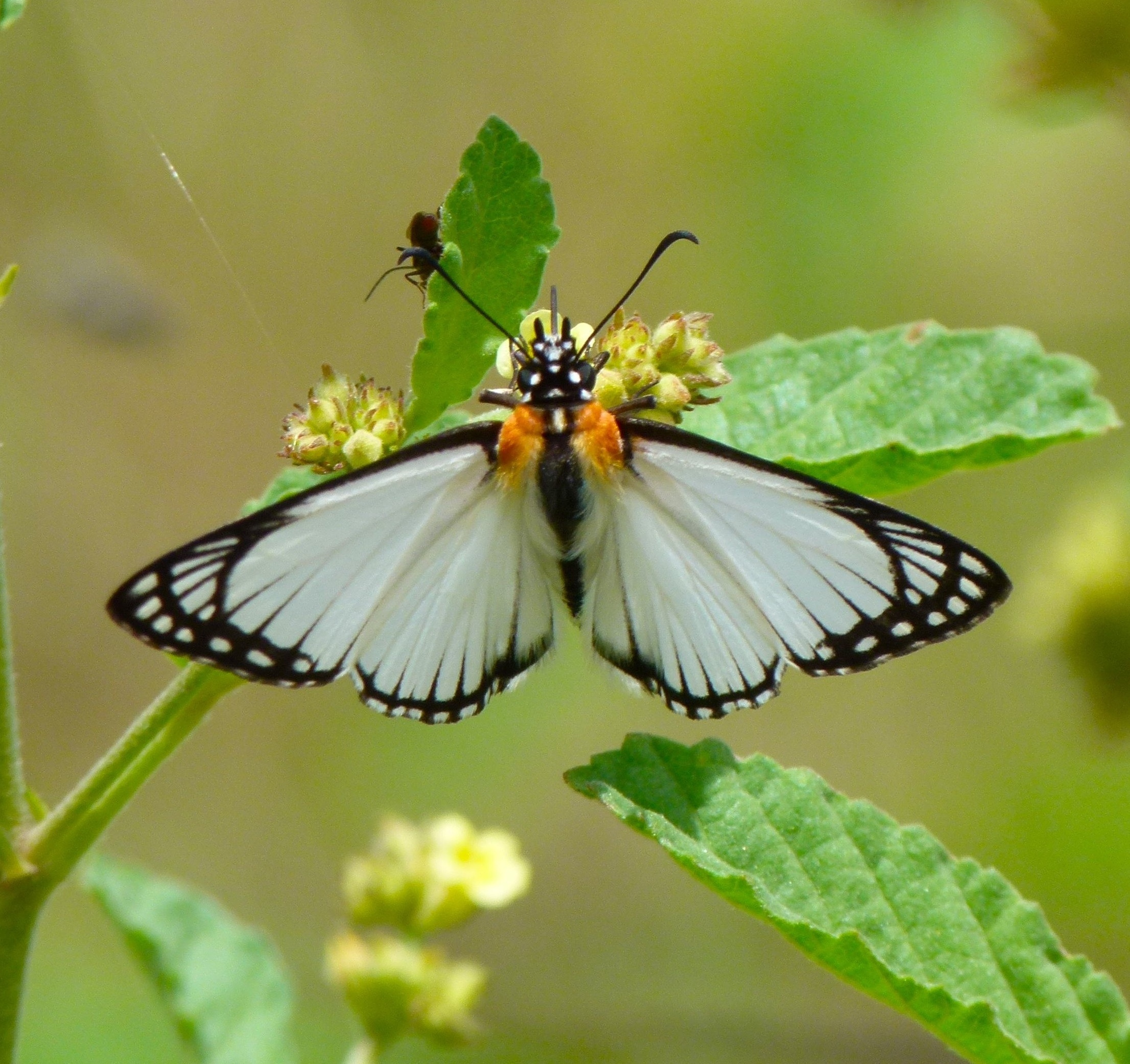
Feeding on sleepy morning nectar
