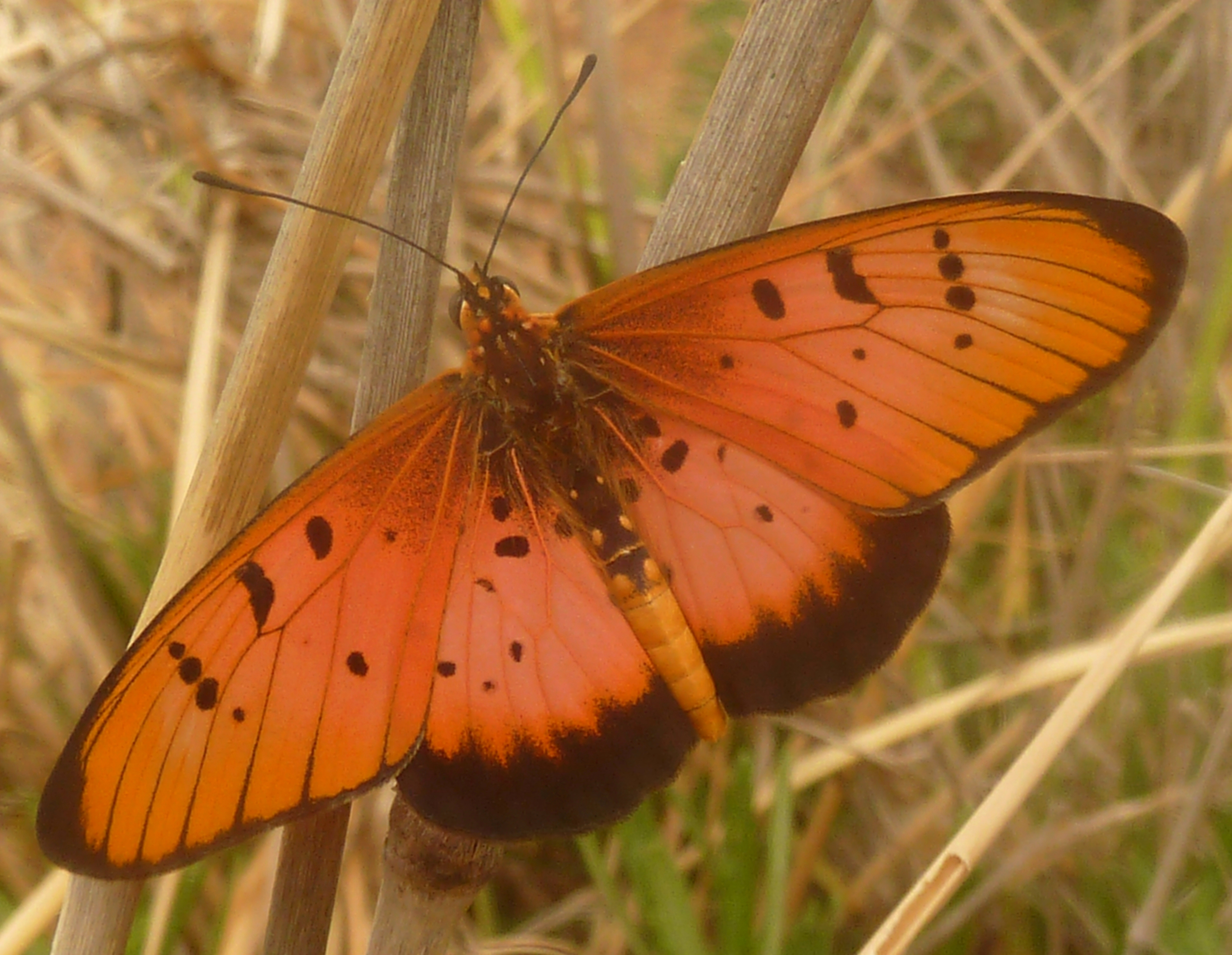

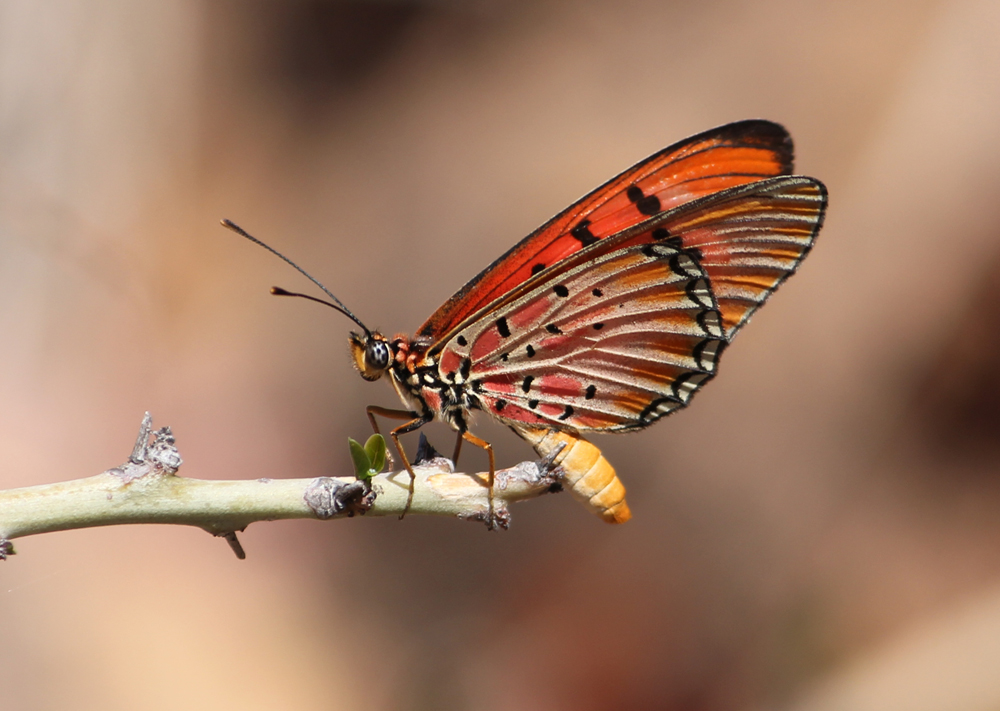
- Dorsal and lateral aspect of male

Conservation status
- Least Concern (IUCN 3.1)

Scientific classification
- Kingdom: Animalia
- Phylum: Arthropoda
- Clade: Pancrustacea
- Class: Insecta
- Order: Lepidoptera
- Family: Nymphalidae
- Genus: Acraea
- Species: A. aglaonice

Binomial name
- Acraea aglaonice Westwood, 1881

Synonyms
- Acraea (Acraea) aglaonice; Acraea fenestrata Trimen, 1881; Acraea aglaonice ab. albofasciata Aurivillius, 1913; Acraea aglaonice f. leucaspis Wichgraf, 1914; Acraea aglaonice f. latimarginata van Son, 1963

= Acraea aglaonice =

Clear-spotted acraea

Species of butterfly

Acraea aglaonice, the clear-spotted acraea, is a butterfly of the family Nymphalidae. It is found in KwaZulu-Natal, Mozambique, Transvaal, Zimbabwe and Botswana.

== Description ==
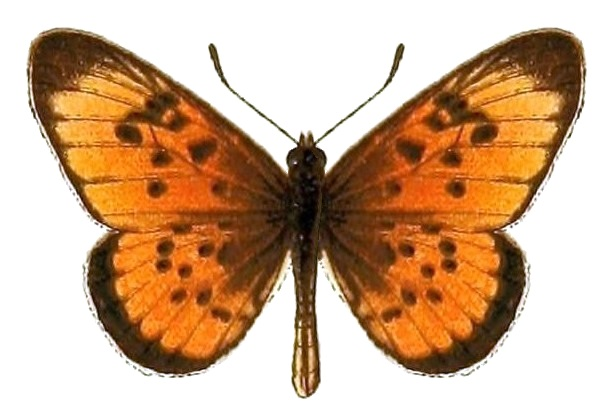
Acraea aglaonice in Seitz (1925)

The wingspan is 43–49 mm for males and 45–55 mm for females. A. aglaonice Westw. Both wings above red-yellow nearly to the base with the usual black dots; the discal dots of the hindwing, however, are smaller than usual and discal dots three to six on the forewing are normally placed far beyond the apex of the cell, opposite to the origin of vein ten; the fore wing above without definite dark apical spot, only with narrow black marginal line as at the costal and distal margins; veins at the distal margin black; hindwing above with black, unspotted marginal band two to three mm. in breadth; wings beneath lighter, hindwing at the base with red spots and in the marginal band with streak-like whitish marginal spots. It is peculiar to this species that the forewing has nearly always in cellules four and five (and six) small hyaline spots, just distally to the discal dots; in the female these spots are often whitish instead of hyaline. Natal; Transvaal; Mashonaland; Manicaland; Delagoa Bay. -ab. albofasciata ab. nov. Fore wing in the basal third blackish, in the middle black-grey and more or less transparent whitish, before the distal margin for a breadth of about five mm. grey-yellow with black veins; at the apex black for about three mm.; black marginal band only one mm. in breadth. Hindwing above black with a white median band seven mm. in breadth, which encloses the comparatively large discal dots. Under surface light grey-yellow with yellow streaks on the interneural folds; forewing only with very fine black marginal line; hindwing with marginal band two mm. in breadth, enclosing large semicircular whitish marginal spots. Manicaland. Should probably be regarded as an extreme rainy-season form.

== Biology ==
Adults are on wing year round, with peaks in early summer and autumn. There are multiple generations per year. The larvae feed on Passiflora edulis and Passiflora incarnata.

== Taxonomy ==
Acraea caecilia species group See also Pierre & Bernaud, 2014
