= Iolaus penningtoni =

Scientific classification
- Kingdom: Animalia
- Phylum: Arthropoda
- Class: Insecta
- Order: Lepidoptera
- Family: Lycaenidae
- Genus: Iolaus
- Species: I. penningtoni

Binomial name
- Iolaus penningtoni (Stempffer & Bennett, 1959)

Synonyms
- Epamera penningtoni Stempffer & Bennett, 1959; Iolaus (Epamera) penningtoni

Species of butterfly

Iolaus penningtoni, the Pennington's sapphire, is a butterfly in the family Lycaenidae. It is found in southern Zambia, Zimbabwe and Botswana. The habitat consists of savanna.

The larvae feed on the Helixanthera species H. kirkii and H. garciana. Young larvae feed on the flowers of their host plant.
