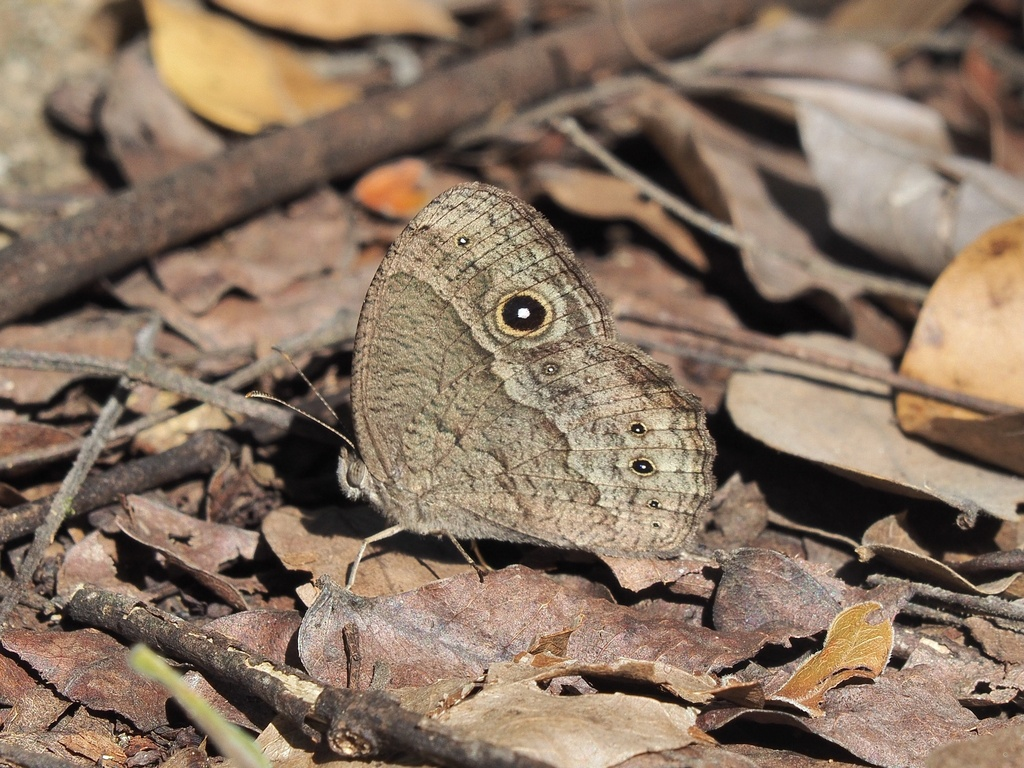

Scientific classification
- Kingdom: Animalia
- Phylum: Arthropoda
- Clade: Pancrustacea
- Class: Insecta
- Order: Lepidoptera
- Family: Nymphalidae
- Genus: Bicyclus
- Species: B. ena

Binomial name
- Bicyclus ena (Hewitson, 1877)

Synonyms
- Mycalesis ena Hewitson, 1877; Mycalesis ena f. kigonserae Aurivillius, 1925

= Bicyclus ena =

Grizzled bush brown

Species of butterfly

Bicyclus ena, the grizzled bush brown, is a butterfly of the family Nymphalidae. It is found from KwaZulu-Natal to Eswatini, Mpumalanga, from Zimbabwe to Kenya and in Uganda.

The wingspan is 38–42 mm for males and 43–48 mm for females.The wings above are uniform dark grey-brown, the forewing with two very distinct, black, white-pupilled eye-spots ringed with dull yellow, a larger one in cellule 2 and a small one in cellule 5. There are two extended generations per year. The wet-season form is on wing in spring and summer and the dry-season form in autumn and winter.
