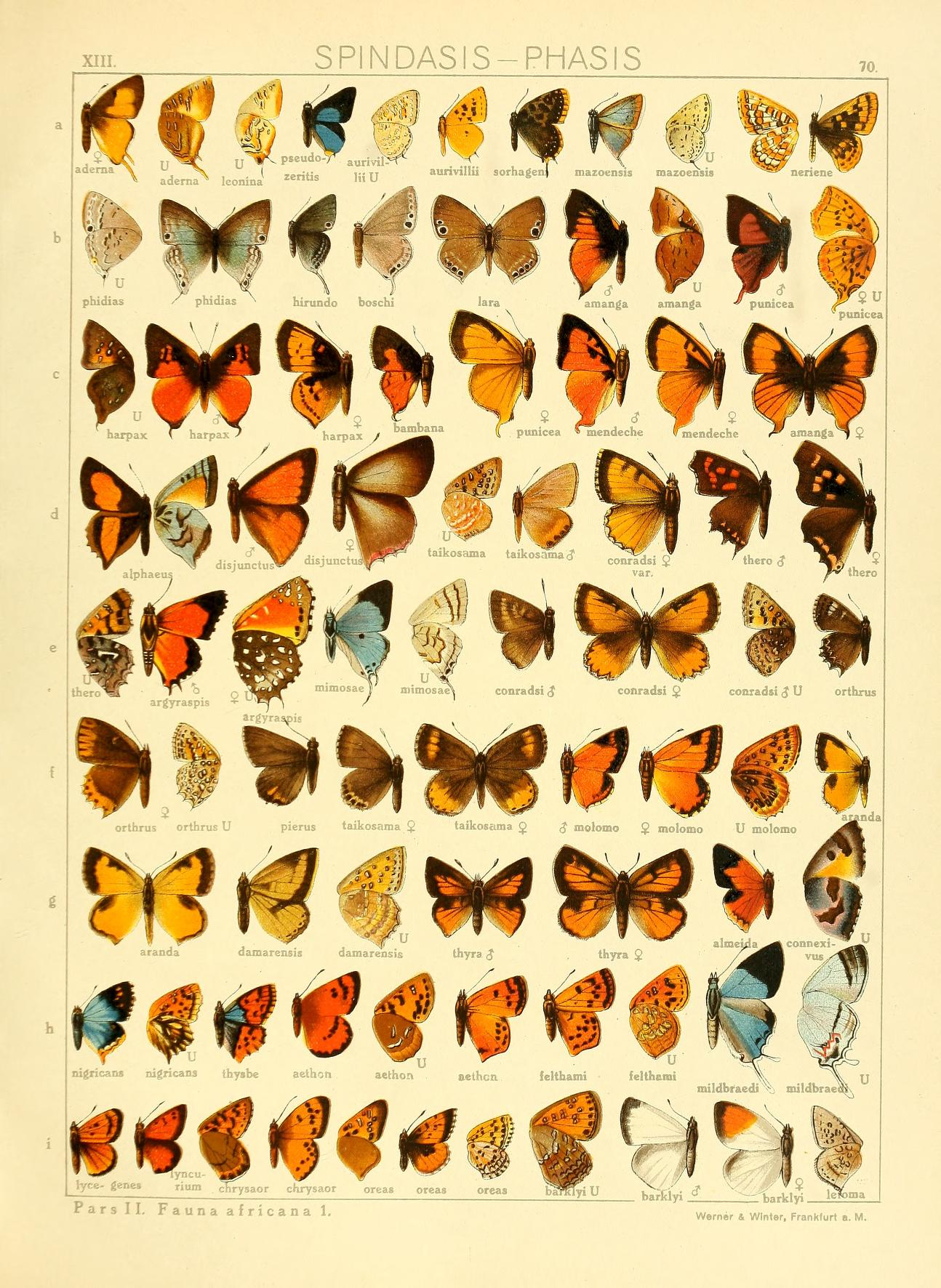

Scientific classification
- Kingdom: Animalia
- Phylum: Arthropoda
- Class: Insecta
- Order: Lepidoptera
- Family: Lycaenidae
- Genus: Zeritis
- Species: Z. sorhagenii

Binomial name
- Zeritis sorhagenii (Dewitz, 1879)

Synonyms
- Plebeius sorhagenii Dewitz, 1879

= Zeritis sorhagenii =

Species of butterfly

Zeritis sorhagenii, the scarce gem, is a butterfly in the family Lycaenidae. It is found in Angola, the Democratic Republic of the Congo (from the southern part of the country to Lualaba and Shaba), Zambia (Lake Bangweulu), Zimbabwe (the north-western part of the country and Kazungulu) and Botswana. The habitat consists of understorey grass in open Brachystegia woodland.

Adults are on wing from December to April.
