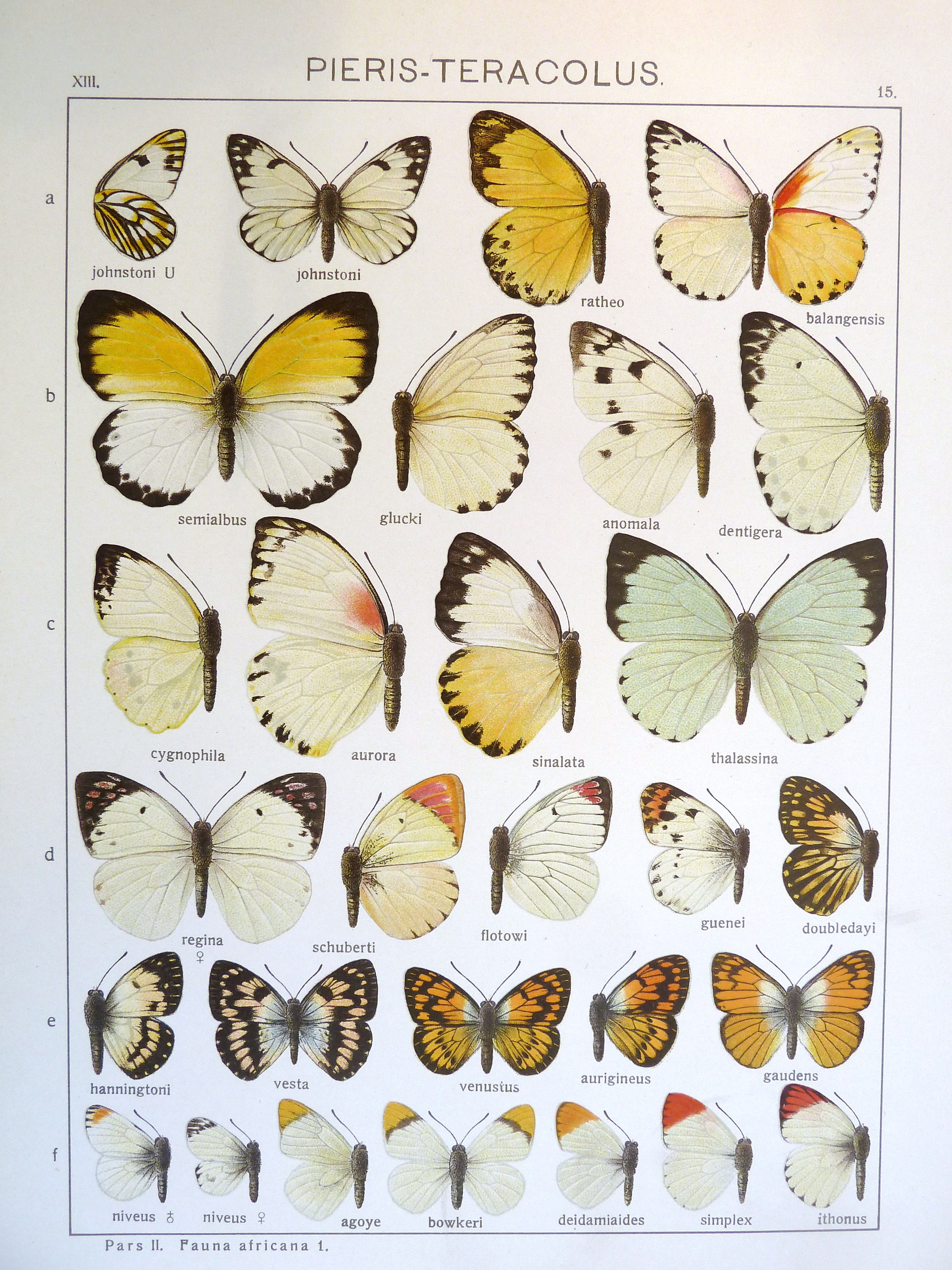
- in Seitz f

Scientific classification
- Kingdom: Animalia
- Phylum: Arthropoda
- Class: Insecta
- Order: Lepidoptera
- Family: Pieridae
- Genus: Colotis
- Species: C. agoye

Binomial name
- Colotis agoye (Wallengren, 1857)

Synonyms
- Anthopsyche agoye Wallengren, 1857; Teracolus agoye Butler, 1897; Anthocharis eosphorus Trimen, 1863; Teracolus bowkeri Trimen, 1883; Teracolus zephyrus Marshall, 1897

= Colotis agoye =

Speckled sulphur tip

Species of butterfly

Colotis agoye, the speckled sulphur tip, is a butterfly of the family Pieridae. It is found in the Afrotropical realm.

The wingspan is 30–44 mm in males and 32–45 mm in females. The adults fly year-round in warm areas, peaking from March to June.

The larvae feed on Boscia and Cadaba species.

== Subspecies ==
The following subspecies are recognised:

- C. a. agoye (Mozambique, southern Zimbabwe, northern and eastern Botswana, northern Namibia South Africa)
- C. a. bowkeri (Trimen, 1883) (south-western Botswana, southern Namibia, South Africa)
- C. a. zephyrus (Marshall, 1897) (Ethiopia, Somalia)
