= Acraea atergatis =

- Acraea atergatis and related species

Scientific classification
- Kingdom: Animalia
- Phylum: Arthropoda
- Clade: Pancrustacea
- Class: Insecta
- Order: Lepidoptera
- Family: Nymphalidae
- Genus: Acraea
- Species: A. atergatis

Binomial name
- Acraea atergatis Westwood, 1881

Synonyms
- Acraea (Acraea) atergatis; Acraea atergatis f. eichleri van Son, 1963

Species of butterfly

Acraea atergatis is a butterfly in the family Nymphalidae. It is found in Malawi, the Democratic Republic of the Congo (Haut-Lomani, Cataractes, Kinshasa), Angola, Zambia, north-western Zimbabwe, northern Botswana and Namibia.

== Description ==
A. atergatis Westw. (55 f) has two rather different seasonal forms. In both forms the wings above are bright uniform orange-yellow to the base, beneath in the dry-season form lighter and in the rainy-season form somewhat darker and more reddish than above; the black dots are arranged as in oncaea, but in the rainy-season form very large and thick; the forewing above is only narrowly black at the costal and distal margins, but without apical spot, and has strong black streaks in 3 to 6; the hindwing is a little blackened at the base of cellule 1 c and the cell; the seasonal forms differ particularly in the development of the marginal band of the hindwing; in the rainy-season form the black marginal band is on both surfaces about 1 mm. in breadth, above unspotted, beneath with narrow streak-like white marginal spots; in the dry-season form the marginal band is entirely absent or is only weakly indicated beneath, hence the marginal streaks of the under surface shade into the ground-colour without any dividing-line; the under surface of the hindwing has more or less distinct red spots. Angola; southern Congo region and Rhodesia.

== Biology ==
The habitat consists of open areas in deciduous woodland.

Adults are on wing year round. There are distinct seasonal forms.

== Taxonomy ==
It is a member of the Acraea caecilia species group. See also Pierre & Bernaud, 2014.
