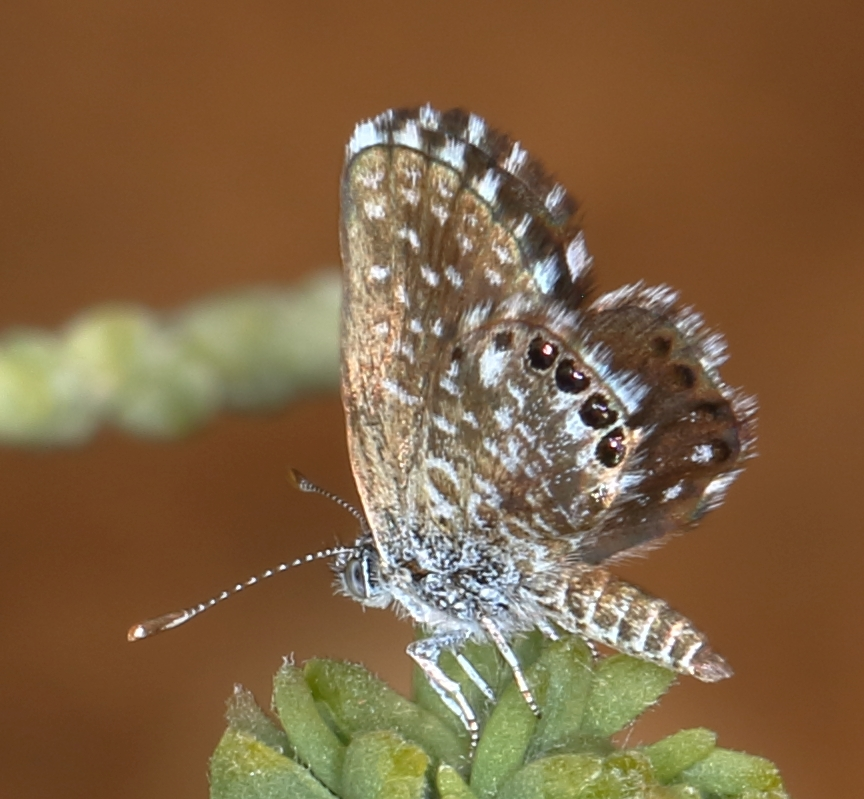

Scientific classification
- Domain: Eukaryota
- Kingdom: Animalia
- Phylum: Arthropoda
- Class: Insecta
- Order: Lepidoptera
- Family: Lycaenidae
- Genus: Brephidium
- Species: B. metophis

Binomial name
- Brephidium metophis (Wallengren, 1860)

Synonyms
- Lycaena metophis Wallengren, 1860

= Brephidium metophis =

Species of butterfly

Brephidium metophis, the tinktinkie blue, is a butterfly of the family Lycaenidae. It is found in southern Africa, including South Africa, Botswana, Mozambique and Zimbabwe. In South Africa, it is found from the Western Cape, north to Namaqualand, which is found both in the northern part of the Western Cape province and the Northern Cape, and east to the Eastern Cape, KwaZulu-Natal and the western part of the Free State province.

The wingspan is 20–24 mm for males and 21–28 mm for females. Adults are on wing continuously depending on the rainfall.

The larvae feed on Exomis axyrioides.
