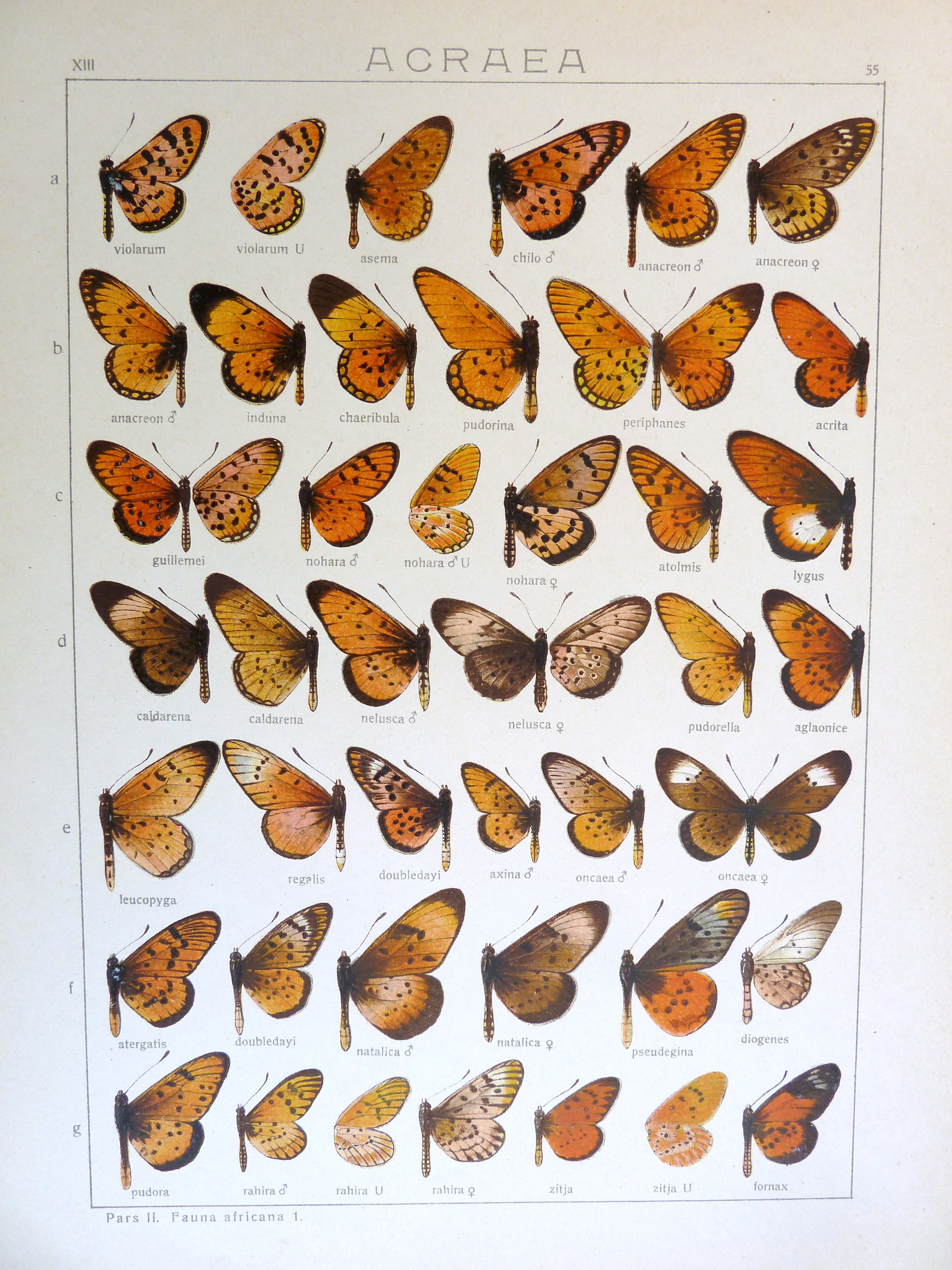
- Seitz Fauna Africana lygus 55c

Conservation status
- Least Concern (IUCN 3.1)

Scientific classification
- Kingdom: Animalia
- Phylum: Arthropoda
- Class: Insecta
- Order: Lepidoptera
- Family: Nymphalidae
- Genus: Acraea
- Species: A. stenobea

Binomial name
- Acraea stenobea Wallengren, 1860

Synonyms
- Acraea (Acraea) stenobea; Acraea acronycta Westwood, 1881; Acraea albomaculata Weymer, 1892

= Acraea stenobea =

Suffused acraea

Species of butterfly

Acraea stenobea, the suffused acraea, is a butterfly of the family Nymphalidae. It is found in Namibia, Botswana, Zimbabwe, Transvaal and the Free State.

== Description ==
The wingspan is 48–55 mm for males and 50–56 mm for females. A. stenobea Wallengr. ( = acronycta Westw.). male Both wings above broadly darkened with black-brown from the base to the middle or often to the apex of the cell; upperside of the forewing only with black marginal line or apical spot; the veins not darkened at the distal margin; that of the hindwing with unspotted, almost entire-margined black marginal band 2 mm. in breadth; ground-colour of the upper surface light brown- yellow, occasionally somewhat reddish. Under surface lighter yellow, at the base of the hindwing reddish; marginal band of the hind wing with large light marginal spots; discal dots of both wings rather large, those in cellules 3 to 5 of the hindwing often absent; the dots in cellules 4 to 6 of the forewing touch one another and are placed rather far beyond the apex of the cell. The female (55 c; = lygus Druce [ now species Acraea lygus ]) only differs from the male in the somewhat darker ground-colour of the upper surface, the broader marginal band of the hindwing, a more or less extended white shade in the middle of the hindwing and often also in the broader scaling at the base. South Africa to Angola and German East Africa.

== Biology ==
Adults are on wing year-round in warm areas, with peaks in September and from March to May.

== Taxonomy ==
It is a member of the Acraea caecilia species group. See also Pierre & Bernaud, 2014.
