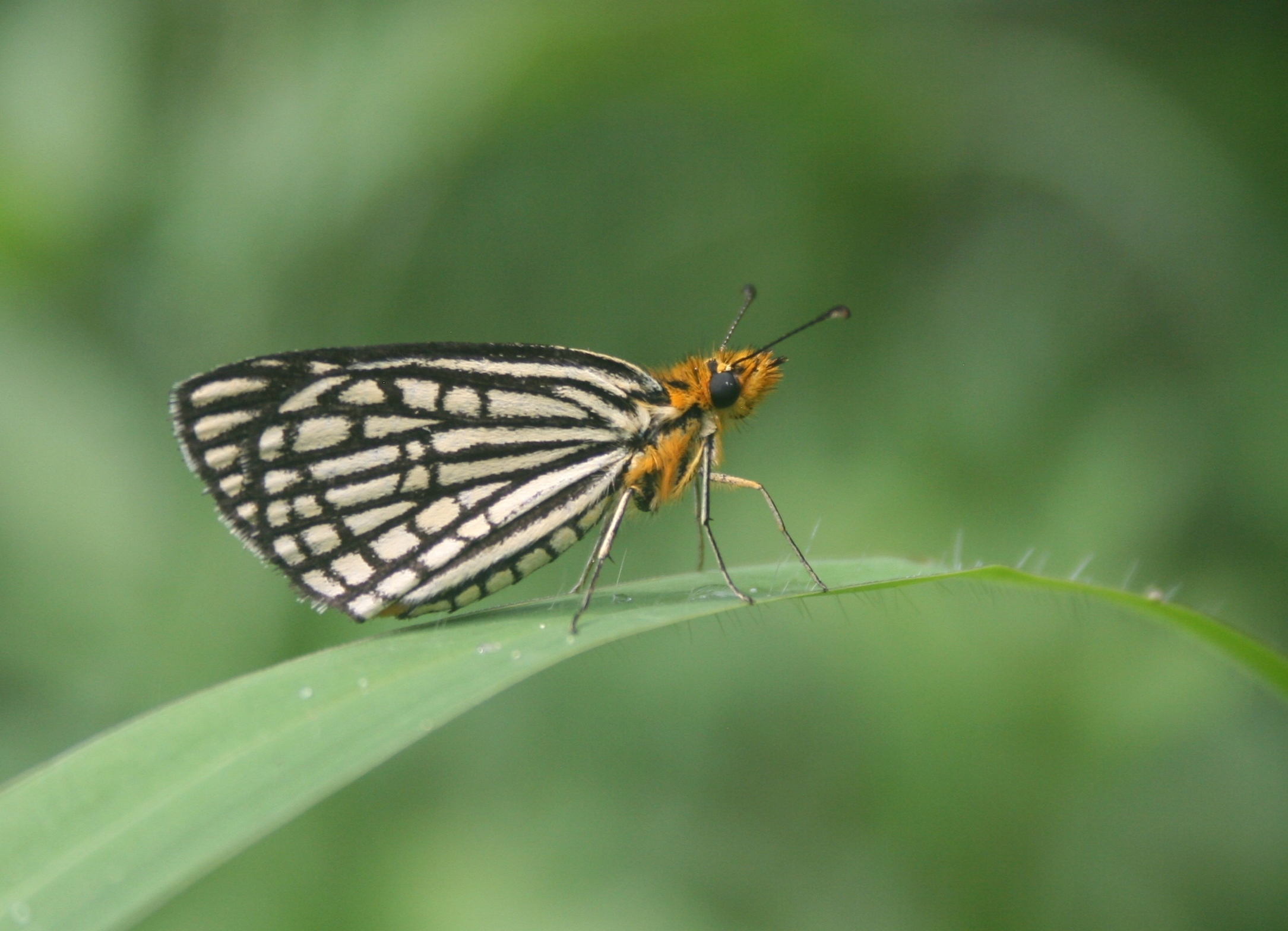

Scientific classification
- Kingdom: Animalia
- Phylum: Arthropoda
- Class: Insecta
- Order: Lepidoptera
- Family: Hesperiidae
- Genus: Willema
- Species: W. willemi

Binomial name
- Willema willemi (Wallengren, 1857)

Synonyms
- List: Heteropterus willemi Wallengren, 1857; Cyclopides willemi; Cyclopides cheles Hewitson, 1868; Metisella willemi (Wallengren, 1857)

= Willema willemi =

Netted sylph

Species of butterfly

Willema willemi, the netted sylph, is a species of butterfly in the family Hesperiidae. It is found from South Africa (Transvaal), Botswana, and Zimbabwe to Kenya, Uganda, and Somalia. The habitat consists of savanna (especially along streams fringed by trees that provide an almost closed canopy) and densely wooded clumps of bush.

The wingspan is 30–32 mm. Adults are on wing from December to May (with a peak from February to March). There is one extended generation per year.

The larvae feed on Setaria species.

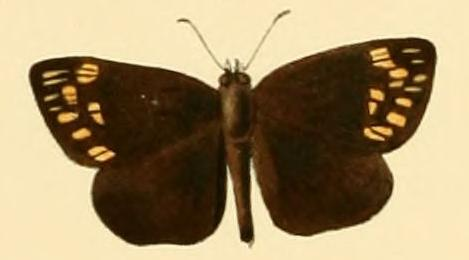
Upperside

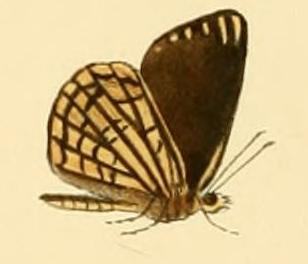
Underside
in Hewitson (1874)
