= Spialia paula =

Mite sandman

Scientific classification
- Domain: Eukaryota
- Kingdom: Animalia
- Phylum: Arthropoda
- Class: Insecta
- Order: Lepidoptera
- Family: Hesperiidae
- Genus: Spialia
- Species: S. paula

Binomial name
- Spialia paula (Higgins, 1925)

Synonyms
- Hesperia paula (Higgins, 1925)

Species of butterfly

Spialia paula, the mite sandman, is a butterfly of the family Hesperiidae.

The wingspan is 20–27 millimetres (0.79–1.06 in). This is a small butterfly that is primarily brown with white spots on the dorsal side of the wings. Adults are on wing between August and April. Adults of both sexes feed from flowers.
