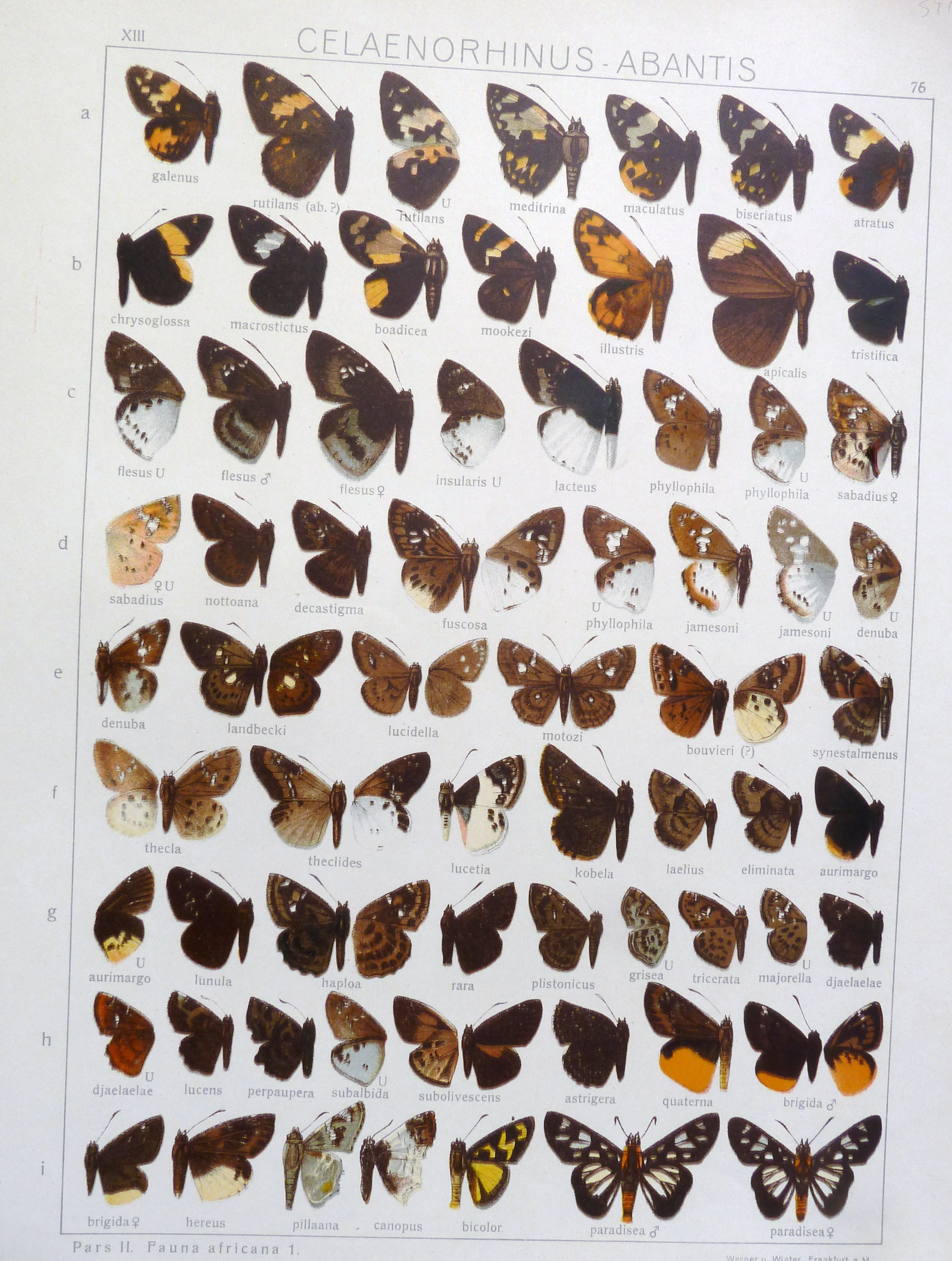
- in Seitz g

Scientific classification
- Kingdom: Animalia
- Phylum: Arthropoda
- Class: Insecta
- Order: Lepidoptera
- Family: Hesperiidae
- Genus: Sarangesa
- Species: S. lucidella

Binomial name
- Sarangesa lucidella (Mabille, 1891)

Synonyms
- Sape lucidella Mabille, 1891; Sarangesa ganyi Bethune-Baker, 1906; Sarangesa lucidella f. marmora Evans, 1937

= Sarangesa lucidella =

Species of butterfly

Sarangesa lucidella, commonly known as the lucidella elfin, is a species of butterfly in the family Hesperiidae. It is found in Ethiopia, Sudan, the Democratic Republic of the Congo, and from Kenya to Zambia, Malawi, Zimbabwe and Botswana. The habitat consists of shady banks of culverts.

Adults are on wing from July to October and from January to May. There are distinct seasonal forms.

== Subspecies ==
- Sarangesa lucidella lucidella - Sudan, Democratic Republic of Congo, Kenya to central and eastern Zambia, Malawi, Zimbabwe, Botswana
- Sarangesa lucidella helena Evans, 1947 - Ethiopia
