= Lepidochrysops longifalces =

Scientific classification
- Kingdom: Animalia
- Phylum: Arthropoda
- Class: Insecta
- Order: Lepidoptera
- Family: Lycaenidae
- Genus: Lepidochrysops
- Species: L. longifalces

Binomial name
- Lepidochrysops longifalces Tite, 1961

Species of butterfly

Lepidochrysops longifalces, the msasa blue, is a butterfly in the family Lycaenidae. It is found in Malawi, Zambia, Zimbabwe and Botswana. The habitat consists of grassy glades in msasa-dominated savanna and rocky hills in deciduous woodland.

Adults are on wing from January to March and have also been recorded in October and April.

The larvae are associated with the ant species Camponotus maculates.
