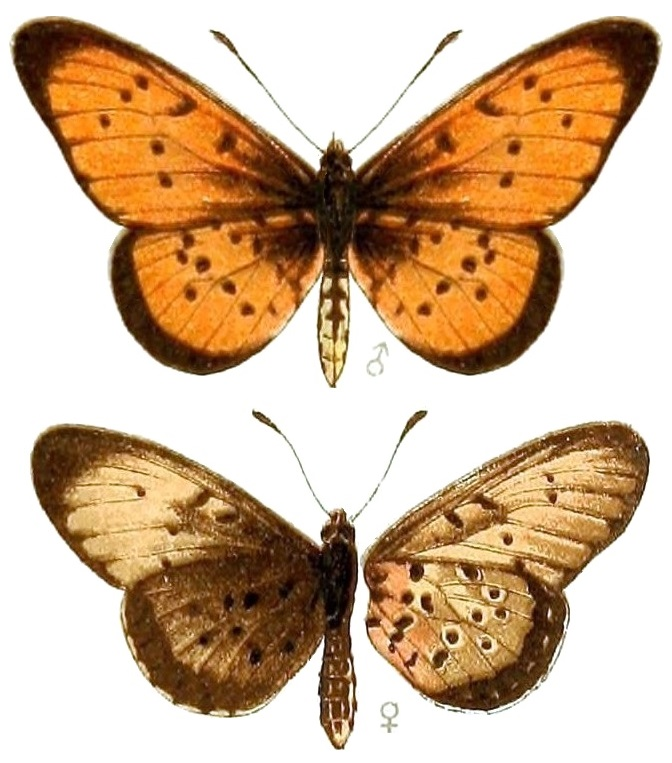
- Acraea caldarena neluska

Scientific classification
- Domain: Eukaryota
- Kingdom: Animalia
- Phylum: Arthropoda
- Class: Insecta
- Order: Lepidoptera
- Family: Nymphalidae
- Genus: Acraea
- Species: A. caldarena

Binomial name
- Acraea caldarena Hewitson, 1877

Synonyms
- Telchinia nero Butler, 1883; Acraea (Acraea) caldarena; Acraea amphimalla Westwood, 1881; Acraea dircaea Westwood, 1881; Acraea caldarena recaldana Suffert, 1904; Acraea caldarena ab. mediofasciata Neustetter, 1916; Acraea leucopyga latiapicalis Joicey and Talbot, 1921; Acraea caldarena caldarena f. pallida Le Doux, 1923; Acraea caldarena necessaria Le Doux, 1923; Acraea caldarena necessaria f. obscuroides Le Doux, 1923; Acraea caldarena necessaria f. decepta Le Doux, 1923; Acraea caldarena necessaria f. kohambullensis Le Doux, 1923; Acraea caldarena intermedia f. marginipunctata Le Doux, 1931; Acraea oncaea var. neluska Oberthür, 1878; Acraea ombria Weymer, 1892

= Acraea caldarena =

Black tip acraea

Species of butterfly

Acraea caldarena, the black tip acraea or black-tipped acraea, is a butterfly of the family Nymphalidae. It is found in southern and southeastern Africa.

== Description ==
A. caldarena Hew. (55 d). male. Ground-colour of both wings above light reddish ochre-yellow to light rose-red (= ab. recaldana Suff.; forewing with a sharply defined black apical spot 7 mm. in breadth, at the costal and distal margins very finely black; discal dots 4 and 5 are small and free and placed nearer to the proximal margin of the apical spot than to the apex of the cell; both wings a little darkened at the base; marginal band of the hindwing usually Avith light spots; under surface of the forewing lighter yellow, of the hindwing reddish; the discal dot in 2 is not placed proximally to the base of vein 3. The female has the wings above broadly darkened at the base, occasionally for the most part blackish. Natal to Damaraland and British East Africa. - female ab. nero Btlr. differs in having the ground-colour of both wings above suffused with dark grey, while the upperside of the hindwing has large, sharply defined, quadrate white spots in cellules 1c to 4 at the proximal side of the unspotted black marginal band. Victoria Nyanza. - f. neluska Oberth. (55f) [now subspecies] is only distinguished from the type-form by having the black apical spot of the forewing narrower, only 3 to 4 mm. in breadth. German East Africa. - The larva has a delicate rose-reddish to orange-yellow ground-colour and black spines and lives on Wormskjoldia longepedunculata. Pupa yellowish with black markings.

== Subspecies ==
- Acraea caldarena caldarena ― South Africa, Zimbabwe, Botswana, Angola, southern DRC (Katanga), Zambia, Malawi, Mozambique, Tanzania and Kenya
- Acraea caldarena neluska Oberthür, 1878 ― coasts of eastern Kenya and eastern Tanzania

== Biology ==
Adults are on the wing year round, with a peak from August to April in southern Africa.

The larvae feed on Passifloraceae species, including Tricliceras longipedunculatum and Adenia species.

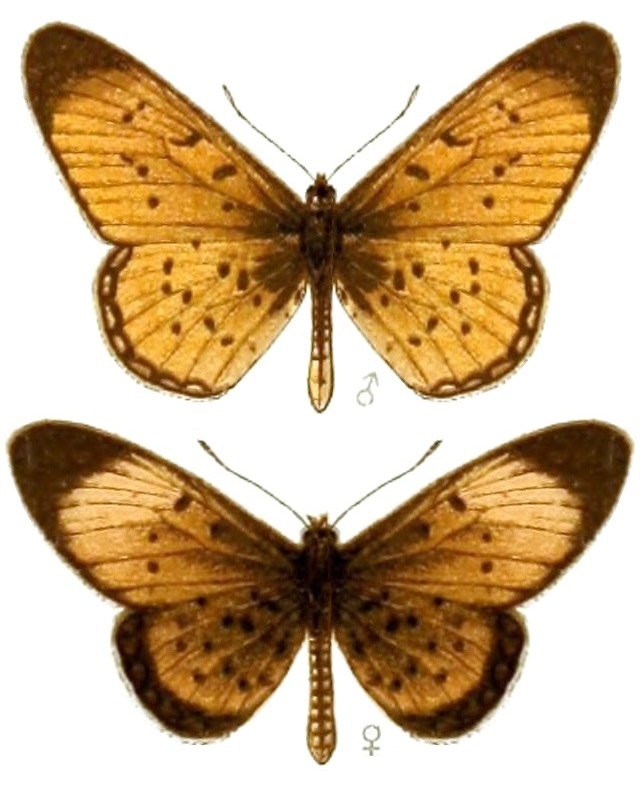
Acraea caldarena caldarena in Seitz (1925)

== Taxonomy ==
It is a member of the Acraea caecilia species group. See also Pierre & Bernaud, 2014.
