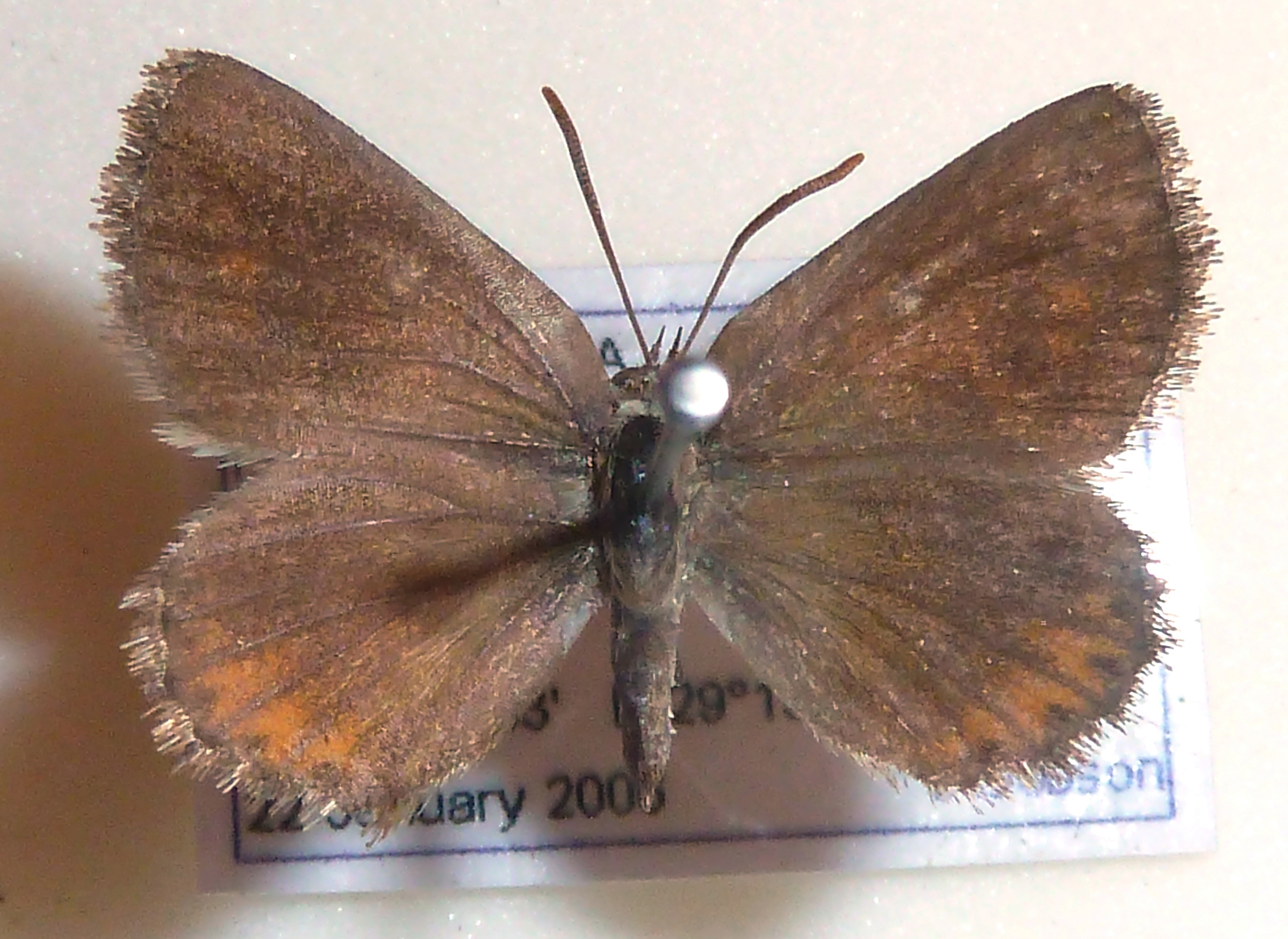

Conservation status
- Least Concern (IUCN 3.1)

Scientific classification
- Kingdom: Animalia
- Phylum: Arthropoda
- Class: Insecta
- Order: Lepidoptera
- Family: Lycaenidae
- Genus: Aloeides
- Species: A. trimeni

Binomial name
- Aloeides trimeni Tite & Dickson, 1973

= Aloeides trimeni =

Trimen's copper

Species of butterfly

Aloeides trimeni, the Trimen's copper, is a butterfly of the family Lycaenidae. It is found in South Africa, where it is found from coastal KwaZulu-Natal to the Drakensberg, north into Mpumalanga and Limpopo.

The wingspan is 22–33 mm for males and 24–35 mm for females. Adults are on wing from September to December (with a peak in October) and from January to April (with a peak in February). There are two generations per year.

The larvae feed on Aspalathus species and Hermannia depressa.

== Subspecies ==
- Aloeides trimeni trimeni (from the Eastern Cape to Free State, Gauteng and Mpumalanga)
- Aloeides trimeni southeayae Tite & Dickson, 1973 (near Mossel Bay in the Western Cape)
