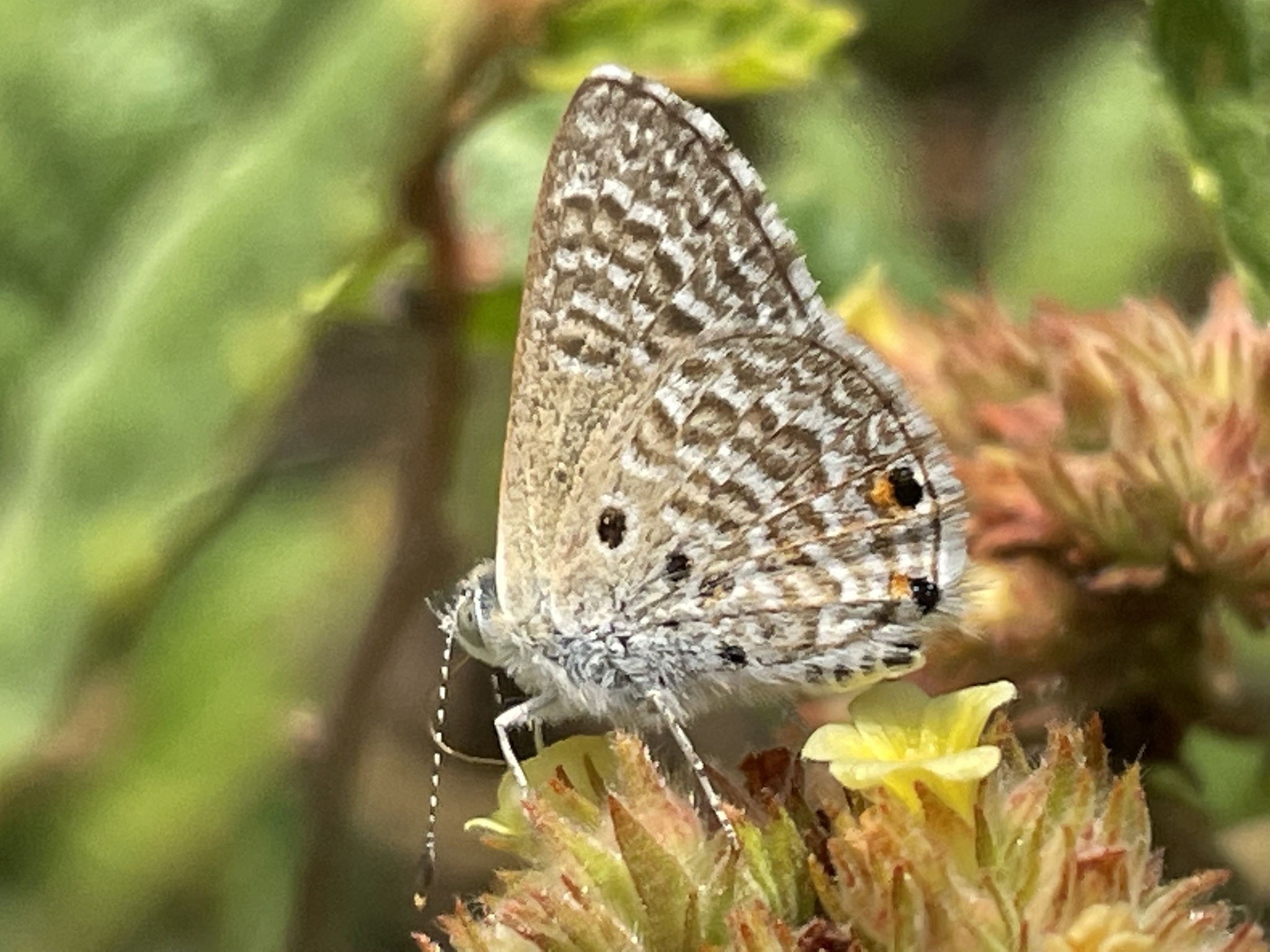

Conservation status
- Least Concern (IUCN 3.1)

Scientific classification
- Kingdom: Animalia
- Phylum: Arthropoda
- Class: Insecta
- Order: Lepidoptera
- Family: Lycaenidae
- Genus: Anthene
- Species: A. talboti

Binomial name
- Anthene talboti Stempffer, 1936

= Anthene talboti =

Species of butterfly

Anthene talboti, the Talbot's hairtail or Talbot's ciliate blue, is a butterfly of the family Lycaenidae. It is found from South Africa to Zimbabwe, Kenya, Uganda and Tanzania. In South Africa it is found in the KwaZulu-Natal midlands, through to Orange Free State, Gauteng, Mpumalanga, the Limpopo Province and the North West Province. It is also present in the North Cape.

The wingspan is 20–24 mm for males and 22–25 mm for females. Adults are on wing from September to June, with peaks in November and from March to April.

The larvae feed on Acacia species, including A. karroo and A. tortilis.
