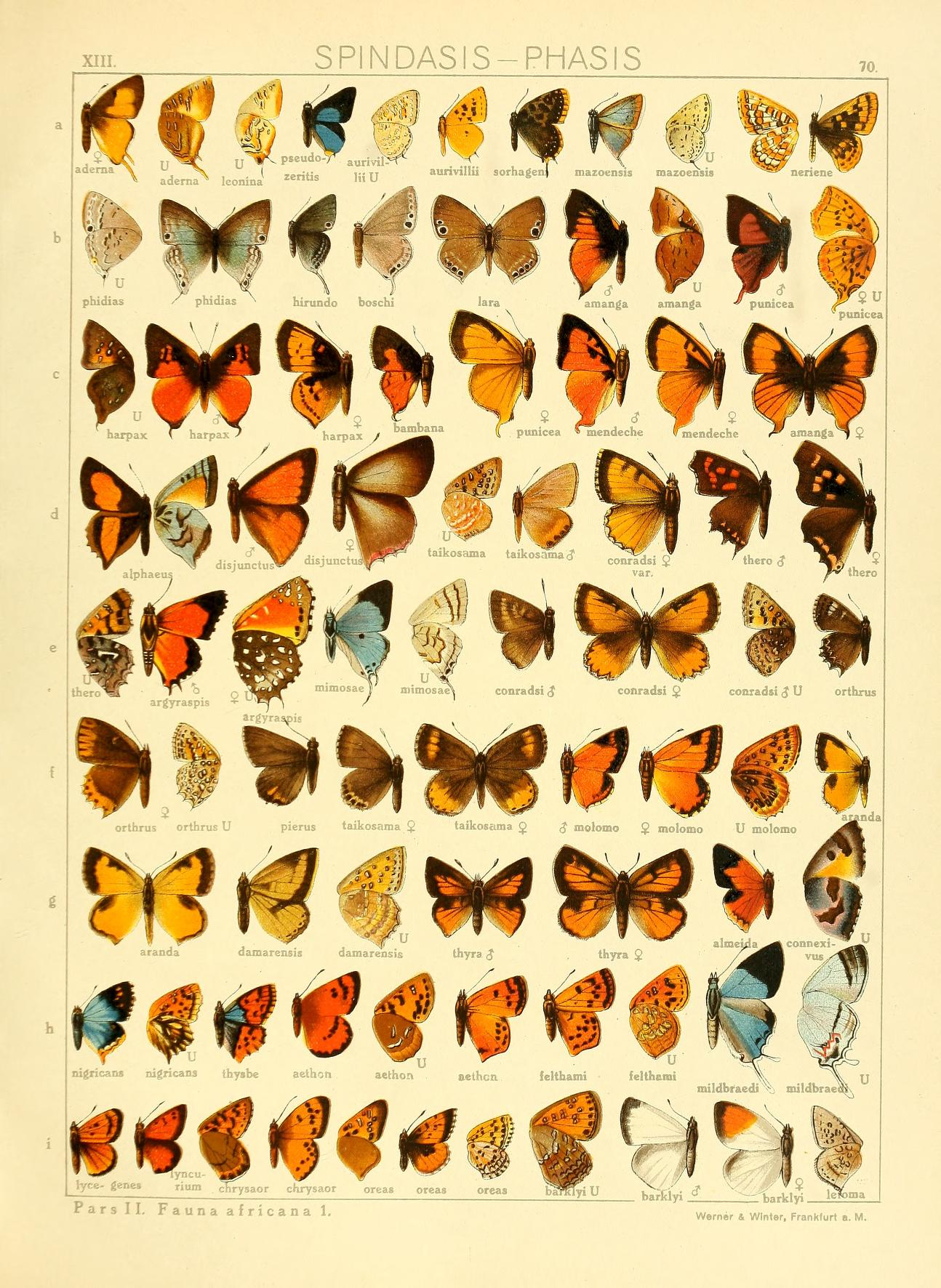

Scientific classification
- Domain: Eukaryota
- Kingdom: Animalia
- Phylum: Arthropoda
- Class: Insecta
- Order: Lepidoptera
- Family: Lycaenidae
- Genus: Chloroselas
- Species: C. mazoensis

Binomial name
- Chloroselas mazoensis (Trimen, 1898)

Synonyms
- Desmolycaena mazoensis Trimen, 1898

= Chloroselas mazoensis =

Purple gem

Species of butterfly

Chloroselas mazoensis, the purple gem, is a butterfly of the family Lycaenidae. It is found in South Africa, in northern KwaZulu-Natal, Mpumalanga, Limpopo and North West provinces. It is also found in Zimbabwe.

The wingspan is 20–24 mm for males and 22–25 mm females. Adults are on wing from September to December and again in May and/or June in a small second generation in northern KwaZulu-Natal.

The larvae probably feed on young shoots of Acacia species.
