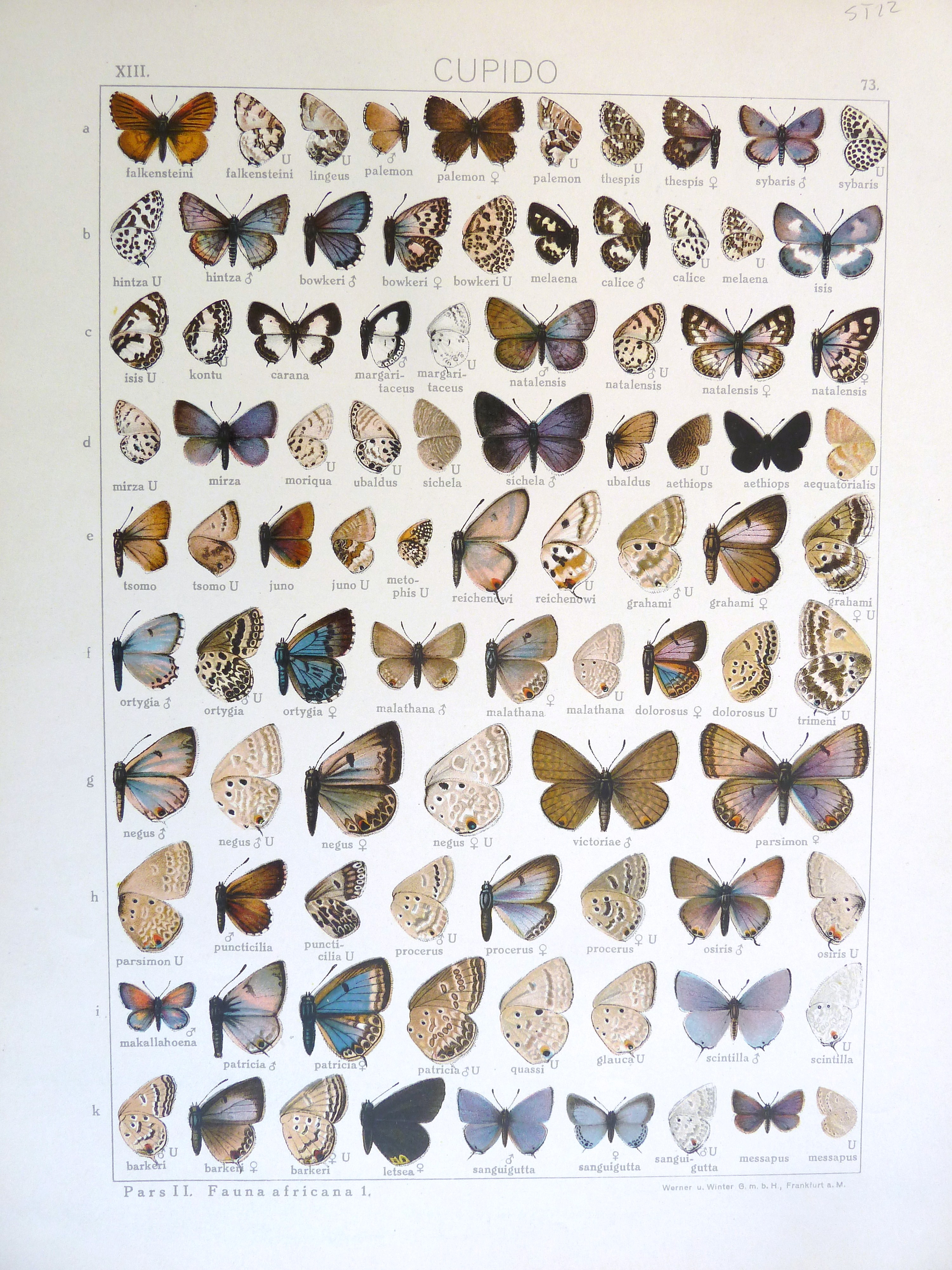
- f

Scientific classification
- Domain: Eukaryota
- Kingdom: Animalia
- Phylum: Arthropoda
- Class: Insecta
- Order: Lepidoptera
- Family: Lycaenidae
- Genus: Euchrysops
- Species: E. dolorosa

Binomial name
- Euchrysops dolorosa (Trimen & Bowker, 1887)

Synonyms
- Lycaena dolorosa Trimen & Bowker, 1887

= Euchrysops dolorosa =

Species of butterfly

Euchrysops dolorosa, the Sabi smoky blue, is a butterfly of the family Lycaenidae. It is found in South Africa, from the Eastern Cape to KwaZulu-Natal, the eastern part of the Free State, Mpumalanga, Gauteng, the Limpopo province, and the North West province.

The wingspan is 22–26 mm for males and 23–29 mm for females. Adults are on wing from August to March depending on spring rains. There are several generations per year.

The larvae feed on Salvia and Ocimum species.
