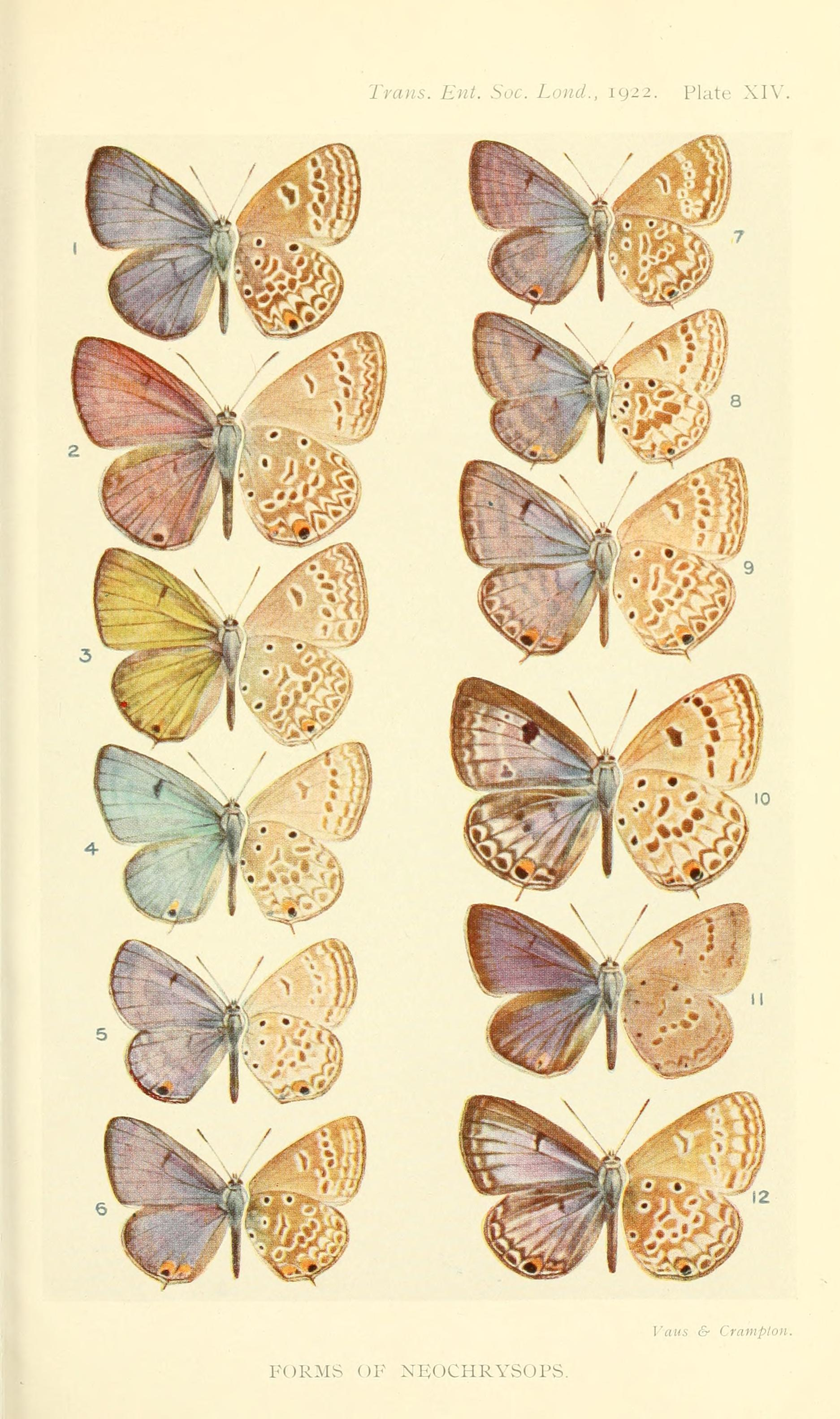
- figure 3

Scientific classification
- Kingdom: Animalia
- Phylum: Arthropoda
- Class: Insecta
- Order: Lepidoptera
- Family: Lycaenidae
- Genus: Lepidochrysops
- Species: L. chloauges

Binomial name
- Lepidochrysops chloauges (Bethune-Baker, [1923])

Synonyms
- Neochrysops chloauges Bethune-Baker, [1923]

= Lepidochrysops chloauges =

Species of butterfly

Lepidochrysops chloauges, the jade blue, is a butterfly in the family Lycaenidae. It is found in Tanzania, Malawi, the Democratic Republic of the Congo (from the southern part of the country to Shaba), Zambia, eastern Angola, northern Zimbabwe and Botswana. The habitat consists of grassy savanna and deciduous woodland.

Both sexes feed from the flowers of herbaceous plants growing amongst grass. Adults are on wing from September to April.
