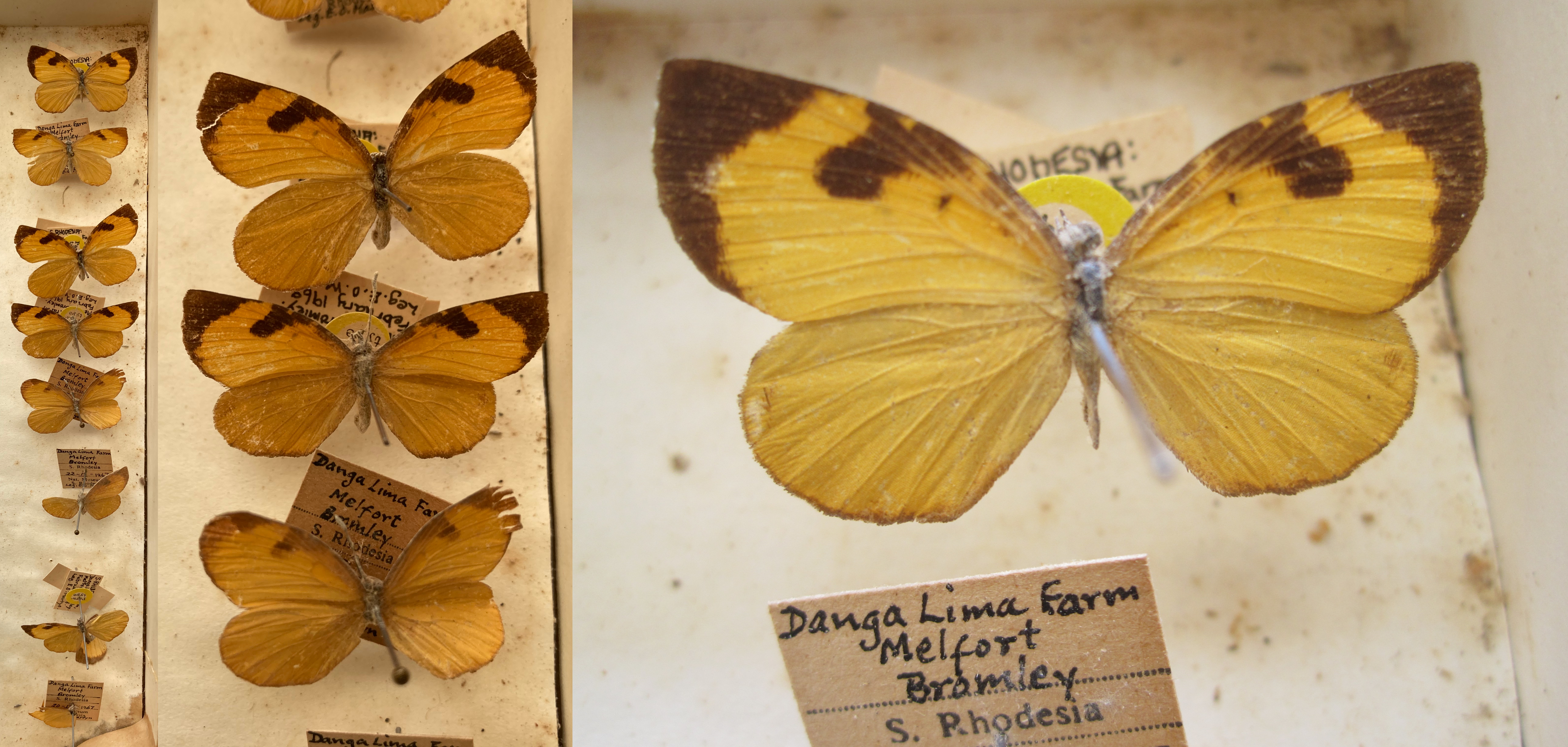
- Various close-ups of the original type specimens used to classify the martyni form of B. singularis.

Scientific classification
- Domain: Eukaryota
- Kingdom: Animalia
- Phylum: Arthropoda
- Class: Insecta
- Order: Lepidoptera
- Family: Lycaenidae
- Genus: Baliochila
- Species: B. singularis

Binomial name
- Baliochila singularis Stempffer and Bennett, 1953

Synonyms
- Baliochila singularis f. martyni Bennett, 1969

= Baliochila singularis =

Lannin's buff

Species of butterfly

Baliochila singularis, the Lannin's buff, is a butterfly in the family Lycaenidae. It is found in Botswana and Zimbabwe. Its habitat consists of bushveld and Brachystegia woodland.

There are two distinct seasonal forms. The wet-season form (f. martyni) and the dry-season form. Adults have been recorded near a Heteropyxis natalensis tree, where they were imbibing the secretions of membracids that were feeding on the tree.

The larvae feed on algae (cyanobacteria) growing on trees.
