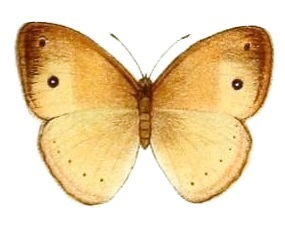
- In Adalbert Seitz's Fauna Africana

Scientific classification
- Kingdom: Animalia
- Phylum: Arthropoda
- Clade: Pancrustacea
- Class: Insecta
- Order: Lepidoptera
- Family: Nymphalidae
- Genus: Heteropsis
- Species: H. simonsii

Binomial name
- Heteropsis simonsii (Butler, 1877)

Synonyms
- Mycalesis simonsii Butler, 1877; Henotesia simonsii; Mycalesis birsha Hewitson, 1877; Mycalesis victorina Westwood, 1881; Henotesia simonsii var. lacus Thurau, 1903; Henotesia teratia f. subolivacea Overlaet, 1955

= Heteropsis simonsii =

Pale bush brown

Species of butterfly

Heteropsis simonsii, the pale bush brown, is a butterfly in the family Nymphalidae. It is found in southern and western Tanzania, the Democratic Republic of the Congo, Zambia, Malawi, Mozambique, Zimbabwe, Namibia, Botswana and South Africa (from Limpopo to the extreme north). The habitat consists of savanna, where it is found on grassy valley slopes, often near streams and rivers.

Both sexes are attracted to fermenting fruit. Adults are on wing year round. There are distinct seasonal forms. Adults of the wet-season form are on wing from November to April, while the dry-season form is on wing from May to October. Intermediate individuals may be observed in April and May.
