= Lepidochrysops vansoni =

Scientific classification
- Kingdom: Animalia
- Phylum: Arthropoda
- Clade: Pancrustacea
- Class: Insecta
- Order: Lepidoptera
- Family: Lycaenidae
- Genus: Lepidochrysops
- Species: L. vansoni

Binomial name
- Lepidochrysops vansoni (Swanepoel, 1949)

Synonyms
- Cupido vansoni Swanepoel, 1949

Species of butterfly

Lepidochrysops vansoni, the Van Son's blue, is a butterfly of the family Lycaenidae. It is found in Limpopo in South Africa, north to Botswana and Zimbabwe.

The wingspan is 28–34 millimetres (1.1–1.3 in) for males and 29–36 millimetres (1.1–1.4 in) for females. Adults are on wing from December to March. There is one generation per year, with adults emerging after rains.
