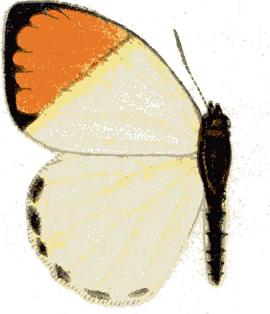
- Male
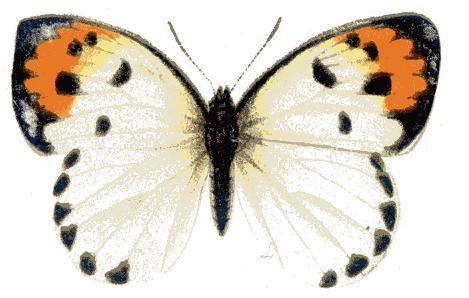
- Female

Scientific classification
- Kingdom: Animalia
- Phylum: Arthropoda
- Class: Insecta
- Order: Lepidoptera
- Family: Pieridae
- Genus: Colotis
- Species: C. dissociatus

Binomial name
- Colotis dissociatus (Butler, 1897)

Synonyms
- Teracolus dissociatus Butler, 1897; Colotis (Colotis) dissociatus

= Colotis dissociatus =

Species of butterfly

Colotis dissociatus is a butterfly in the family Pieridae. It is found in the Tanzania, Malawi, southern and eastern Zambia, northern Mozambique, Zimbabwe and Botswana. The habitat consists of dry savanna and moister savanna.

The larvae feed on Capparis species.
