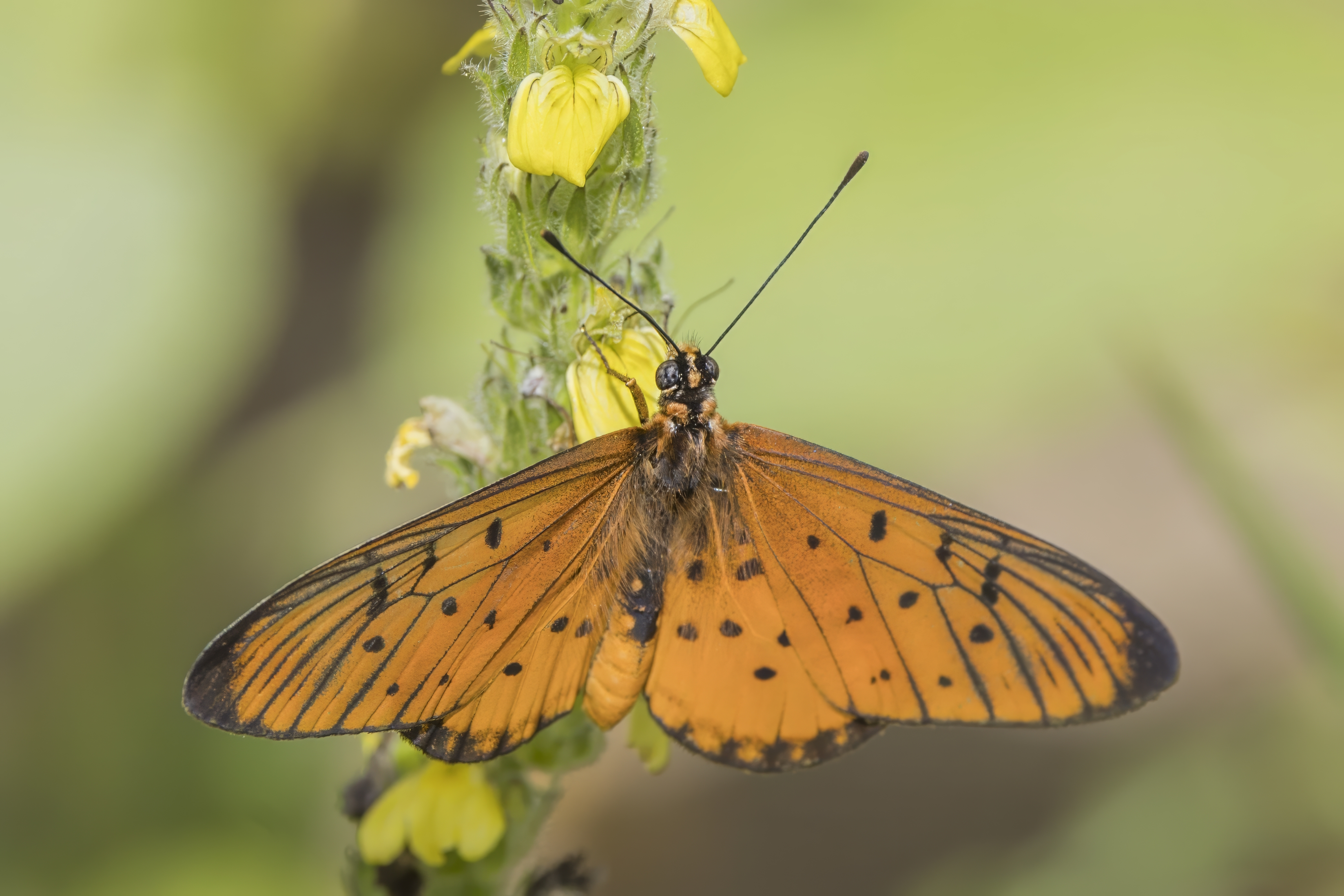
- male
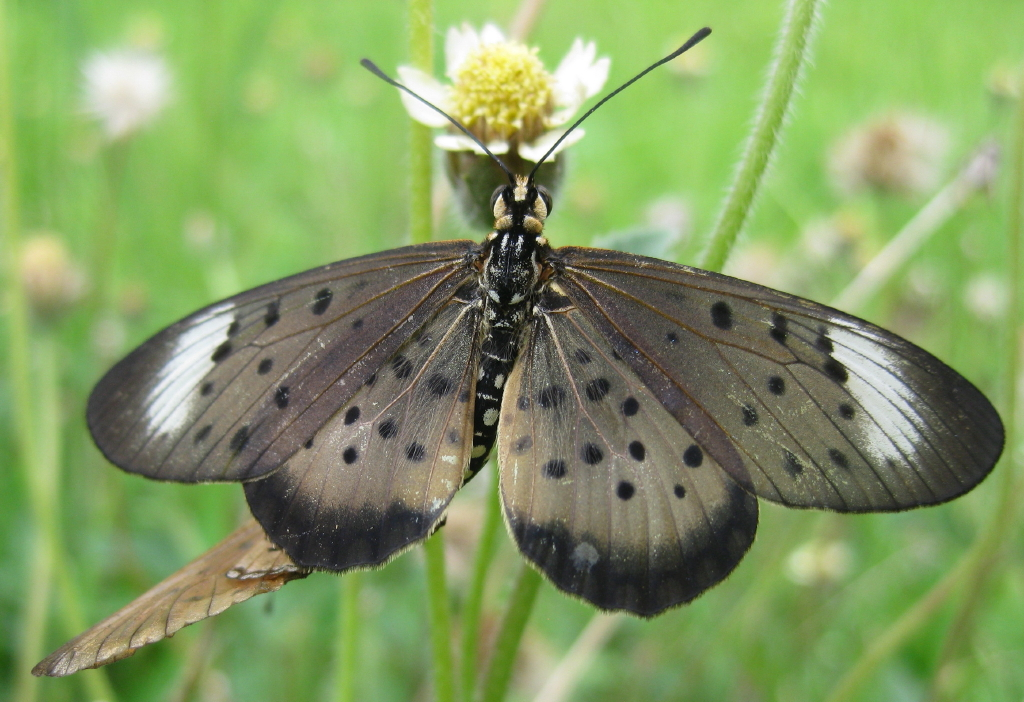
- female

Conservation status
- Least Concern (IUCN 3.1)

Scientific classification
- Kingdom: Animalia
- Phylum: Arthropoda
- Class: Insecta
- Order: Lepidoptera
- Family: Nymphalidae
- Genus: Acraea
- Species: A. oncaea

Binomial name
- Acraea oncaea Hopffer, 1855

Synonyms
- Acraea (Acraea) oncaea; Acraea doubledayi Trimen, 1887; Acraea oncaea caoncius Suffert, 1904; Acraea oncaea alboradiata Suffert, 1904; Acraea oncaea modesta Suffert, 1904; Acraea oncaea obscura Suffert, 1904; Acraea oncaea defasciata Suffert, 1904; Acraea caecilia liacea Suffert, 1904; Acraea oncaea f. distincta Le Doux, 1923

= Acraea oncaea =

Window acraea

Species of butterfly

Acraea oncaea, the window acraea, is a butterfly of the family Nymphalidae. It is found in KwaZulu-Natal, Transvaal, Zimbabwe, Mozambique, from eastern Africa to Abyssinia and in Congo.

== Description ==
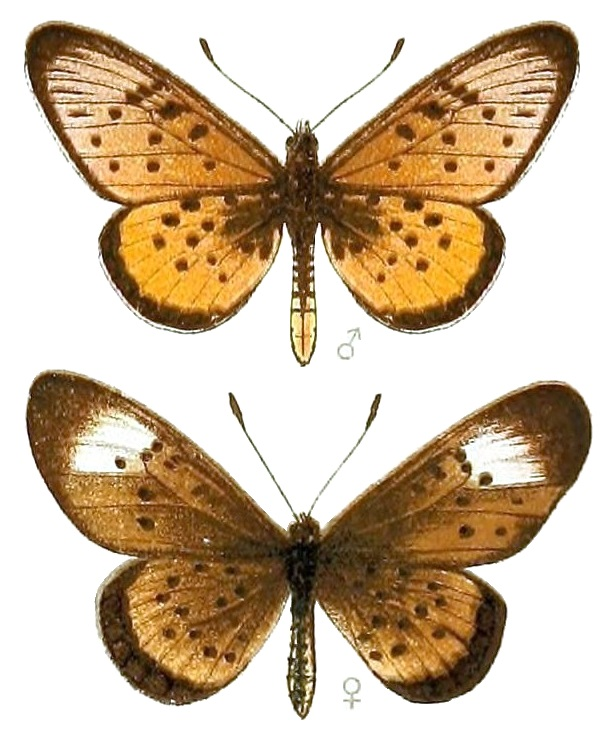
Male and female in Seitz (1925)

The wingspan is 40–48 mm (1.6–1.9 in) for males and 43–55 mm (1.7–2.2 in) for females. A. oncaea Hpff. (55 e) is distinguished at once by the fine black submarginal longitudinal streaks in cellules 3 to 5 (to 6) of the fore wing; the discal dot in 6 is usually wanting on the fore wing. male – the forewing is thinly scaled, with dull orange-yellow ground-colour, at the base not darkened, and at the apex only black for a breadth of 2 mm.; discal dots usually small and punctiform, arranged exactly as in caecilia. Hindwing more densely scaled than the fore wing and above more reddish; its marginal band very narrow but more distinctly spotted. In the female the wings have the ground-colour above dark grey and the fore wing has a broad white subapical band from the costal margin to vein 3. South and East Africa to the southern Congo region and Abyssinia.-female ab. obscura Suff. Forewing above brown, hindwing above whitish with rose-red spots at the base, at the inner margin and behind the discal dots. -female ab. defasciata Suff. Forewing brown without white subapical band. - female ab. alboradiata Suff. has the veins of the hindwing white. -female ab. modesta Suff. Hindwing with a large white area in the middle. - caoncius Suff. is a seasonal form (?), in which the apex of the forewing above has only a fine black marginal line quite as on the under surface. German East Africa, ab. liacea Suff. only differs in having the marginal band of the hindwing not sharply defined above and composed of thick black lunules beneath. German East Africa.

== Biology ==
Adults are on the wing year round, with a peak from September to May. There are multiple generations per year.

The larvae feed on Xylotheca kraussiana, Tricliceras longepedunculatum and Passifloraceae species, including Adenia species.

== Taxonomy ==
It is a member of the Acraea caecilia species group. See also Pierre & Bernaud, 2014.
