= List of butterflies of Lesotho =

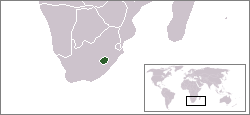
Location of Lesotho

This is a list of butterflies of Lesotho. About 93 species are known from Lesotho, one of which, Torynesis pringlei, is endemic.

== Papilionidae ==
=== Papilioninae ===
==== Papilionini ====
- Papilio demodocus Esper, [1798] - citrus swallowtail

== Pieridae ==
=== Coliadinae ===
- Eurema brigitta (Stoll, [1780]) - small grass yellow
- Eurema hecabe solifera (Butler, 1875) - common grass yellow
- Catopsilia florella (Fabricius, 1775) - African migrant
- Colias electo (Linnaeus, 1763) - African clouded yellow

=== Pierinae ===
- Colotis euippe omphale (Godart, 1819) - smoky orange tip
- Colotis evenina (Wallengren, 1857) - common orange tip

==== Pierini ====
- Pontia helice (Linnaeus, 1764) - meadow white
- Belenois aurota (Fabricius, 1793) - pioneer white

== Lycaenidae ==
=== Miletinae ===
==== Miletini ====
- Thestor basutus (Wallengren, 1857) - Basuto skolly

=== Aphnaeinae ===
- Chrysoritis chrysaor (Trimen, 1864) - burnished opal
- Chrysoritis turneri amatola (Dickson & McMaster, 1967) - Turner's opal
- Chrysoritis pelion (Pennington, 1953) - Machacha opal
- Cigaritis mozambica (Bertoloni, 1850) - Mozambique silverline
- Aloeides aranda (Wallengren, 1857) - Aranda copper
- Aloeides henningi Tite & Dickson, 1973 - Henning's copper
- Aloeides pierus (Cramer, 1779) - dull copper
- Aloeides maluti Pringle, 1983 - Maluti copper
- Aloeides trimeni Tite & Dickson, 1973 - Trimen's copper
- Aloeides molomo (Trimen, 1870) - molomo copper
- Aloeides taikosama (Wallengren, 1857) - dusky copper
- Aloeides oreas Tite & Dickson, 1968 - oreas copper
- Aloeides dentatis maseruna (Riley, 1938) - Roodeport copper
- Aloeides rileyi Tite & Dickson, 1976 - Riley's copper
- Aloeides braueri Tite & Dickson, 1968 - Brauer's copper

=== Theclinae ===
- Leptomyrina hirundo (Wallengren, 1857) - tailed black-eye
- Leptomyrina lara (Linnaeus, 1764) - Cape black-eye

=== Polyommatinae ===
==== Lycaenesthini ====
- Anthene butleri livida (Trimen, 1881) - pale hairtail
- Lycaena clarki Clark & Dickson, 1971 - eastern sorrel copper

==== Polyommatini ====
- Cupidopsis cissus (Godart, [1824]) - common meadow blue
- Cupidopsis jobates (Hopffer, 1855) - tailed meadow blue
- Lampides boeticus (Linnaeus, 1767) - pea blue
- Cacyreus lingeus (Stoll, 1782) - common bush blue
- Cacyreus tespis (Herbst, 1804) - water blue
- Harpendyreus tsomo (Trimen, 1868) - Tsomo blue
- Zizeeria knysna (Trimen, 1862) - dark grass blue
- Actizera lucida (Trimen, 1883) - rayed blue
- Zizula hylax (Fabricius, 1775) - tiny grass blue
- Oraidium barberae (Trimen, 1868) - dwarf blue
- Azanus jesous (Guérin-Méneville, 1849) - topaz-spotted blue
- Azanus moriqua (Wallengren, 1857) - thorn-tree blue
- Azanus ubaldus (Stoll, 1782) - bright babul blue
- Eicochrysops messapus messapus (Godart, 1824) - cupreous blue
- Eicochrysops messapus mahallakoaena (Wallengren, 1857) - cupreous blue
- Orachrysops nasutus remus Henning & Henning, 1994 - nosy blue
- Freyeria trochylus (Freyer, [1843]) - grass jewel
- Lepidochrysops lerothodi (Trimen, 1904) - Lesotho blue
- Lepidochrysops letsea (Trimen, 1870) - Free State blue
- Lepidochrysops loewensteini (Swanepoel, 1951) - Loewenstein's blue
- Lepidochrysops oosthuizeni Swanepoel & Vári, 1983 - Oosthuizen's blue
- Lepidochrysops ortygia (Trimen & Bowker, 1887) - koppie blue
- Lepidochrysops patricia (Trimen & Bowker, 1887) - patrician blue
- Lepidochrysops variabilis Cottrell, 1965 - variable blue

== Nymphalidae ==
=== Danainae ===
==== Danaini ====
- Danaus chrysippus orientis (Aurivillius, 1909) - African queen

=== Satyrinae ===
==== Melanitini ====
- Aeropetes tulbaghia (Linnaeus, 1764) - mountain pride

==== Satyrini ====
- Neita lotenia (van Son, 1949) - Loteni brown
- Pseudonympha magoides van Son, 1955 - false silver-bottom brown
- Pseudonympha varii van Son, 1955 - Vari's brown
- Pseudonympha gaika Riley, 1938 - Gaika brown
- Pseudonympha paludis Riley, 1938 - paludis brown
- Pseudonympha penningtoni Riley, 1938 - Pennington's brown
- Pseudonympha machacha Riley, 1938 - Machacha brown
- Paternympha narycia (Wallengren, 1857) - spotted-eye brown
- Stygionympha vigilans (Trimen & Bowker, 1887) - western hillside brown
- Stygionympha scotina Quickelberge, 1977 - eastern hillside brown
- Stygionympha wichgrafi williami Henning & Henning, 1996 - Wichgraf's brown
- Serradinga bowkeri (Trimen, 1870) - Bowker's widow
- Torynesis pringlei Dickson, 1979 - Pringle's widow

=== Nymphalinae ===
==== Nymphalini ====
- Vanessa cardui (Linnaeus, 1758) - painted lady
- Junonia hierta cebrene Trimen, 1870 - yellow pansy
- Junonia oenone (Linnaeus, 1758) - dark blue pansy
- Junonia orithya madagascariensis Guenée, 1865 - eyed pansy
- Hypolimnas misippus (Linnaeus, 1764) - Danaid eggfly

=== Biblidinae ===
==== Biblidini ====
- Byblia ilithyia (Drury, 1773) - spotted joker

=== Heliconiinae ===
==== Acraeini ====
- Acraea horta (Linnaeus, 1764) - garden acraea
- Acraea neobule Doubleday, 1847 - wandering donkey acraea
- Acraea lygus Druce, 1875 - lygus acraea
- Acraea anacreon Trimen, 1868 - large orange acraea

==== Vagrantini ====
- Phalanta phalantha aethiopica (Rothschild & Jordan, 1903) - common leopard

== Hesperiidae ==
=== Coeliadinae ===
- Coeliades forestan (Stoll, [1782]) - striped policeman
- Coeliades pisistratus (Fabricius, 1793) - two-pip policeman

=== Pyrginae ===
==== Carcharodini ====
- Spialia agylla (Trimen & Bowker, 1889) - grassveld sandman
- Spialia asterodia (Trimen, 1864) - star sandman
- Spialia diomus ferax (Wallengren, 1863) - common sandman
- Spialia mafa (Trimen, 1870) - Mafa sandman
- Spialia spio (Linnaeus, 1764) - mountain sandman

=== Hesperiinae ===
==== Aeromachini ====
- Kedestes barberae (Trimen, 1873) - Barber's ranger
- Kedestes niveostriga (Trimen, 1864) - dark ranger

==== Baorini ====
- Gegenes niso (Linnaeus, 1764) - plain Hottentot skipper

=== Heteropterinae ===
- Metisella aegipan (Trimen, 1868) - mountain sylph
- Metisella malgacha orina Vári, 1976 - grassveld sylph
- Metisella syrinx (Trimen, 1868) - bamboo sylph
- Tsitana tsita (Trimen, 1870) - dismal sylph

== See also ==
- Geography of Lesotho
