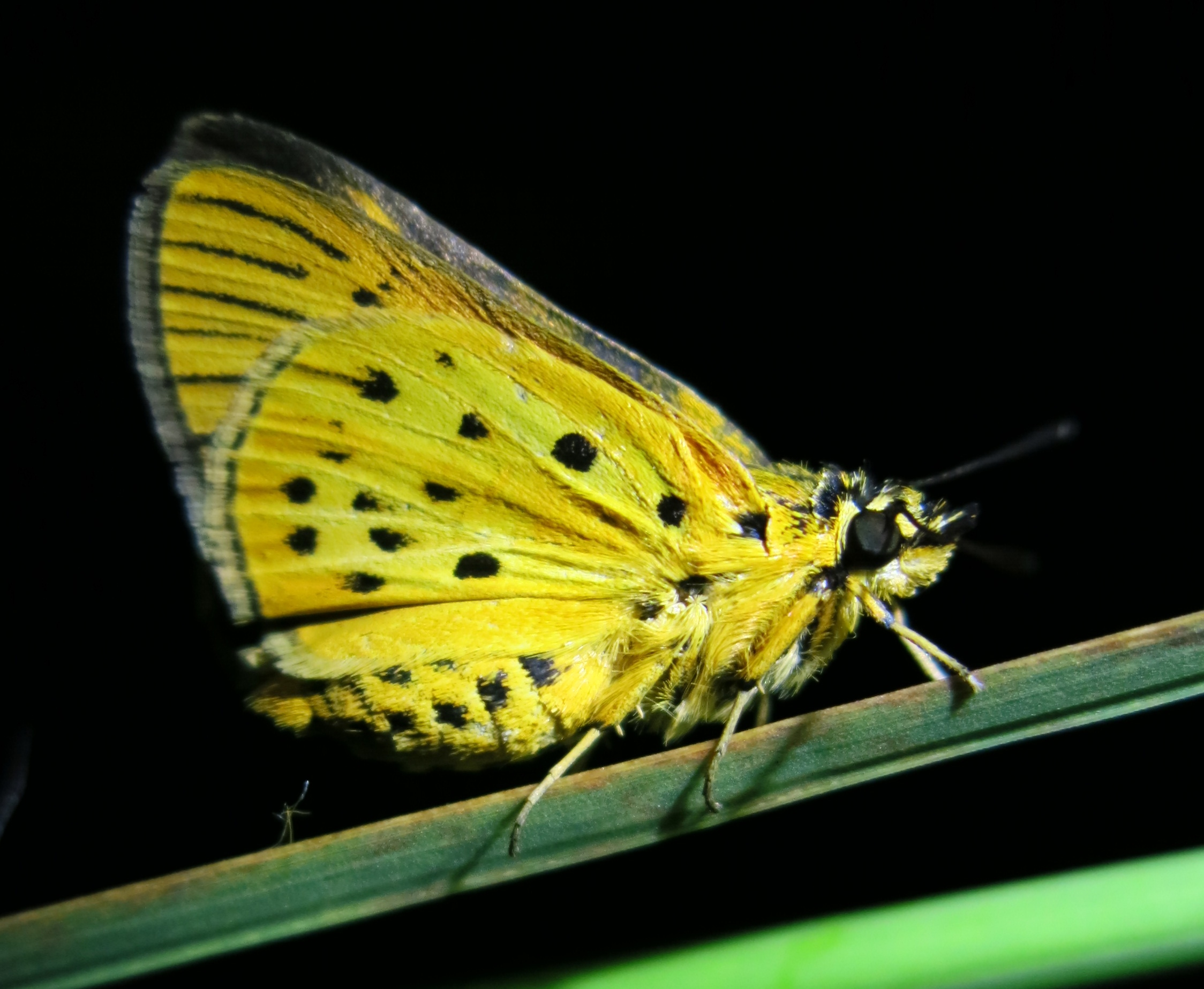
- K. macomo

Scientific classification
- Kingdom: Animalia
- Phylum: Arthropoda
- Class: Insecta
- Order: Lepidoptera
- Family: Hesperiidae
- Tribe: Erionotini
- Genus: Kedestes; Watson, 1893

Species
- see text

= Kedestes =

Rangers

Genus of butterflies

Kedestes is a genus of skippers in the family Hesperiidae, commonly known as rangers. The genus is restricted to the Afrotropical realm, where it occurs mostly in the East and South. The larvae of several species feed on grasses. It is thought to be related to Ampittia.

== Species ==
- Kedestes brunneostriga (Plötz, 1884)
- Kedestes lema Neave, 1910
- Kedestes lenis Riley, 1932
- Kedestes lepenula (Wallengren, 1857)
- Kedestes macomo (Trimen, 1862)
- Kedestes malua Neave, 1910
- Kedestes marshalli Aurivillius, 1925
- Kedestes niveostriga (Trimen, 1864)
- Kedestes rogersi Druce, 1907
- Kedestes straeleni Evans, 1956
- Kedestes sublineata Pennington, 1953

=== Former species ===
- Kedestes barberae (Trimen, 1873) - transferred to Trida barberae (Trimen, 1873)
- Kedestes callicles (Hewitson, 1868) - transferred to Dotta callicles (Hewitson, 1868)
- Kedestes chaca (Trimen, 1873) - transferred to Nervia chaca (Trimen, 1873)
- Kedestes ekouyi Vande weghe and Albert, 2009 - transferred to Nervia ekouyi (Vande weghe and Albert, 2009)
- Kedestes heathi Hancock & Gardiner, 1982 - transferred to Nervia heathi (Hancock & Gardiner, 1982)
- Kedestes michaeli Gardiner & Hancock, 1982 - transferred to Nervia michaeli (Gardiner & Hancock, 1982)
- Kedestes monostichus Hancock & Gardiner, 1982 - transferred to Nervia monostichus (Hancock & Gardiner, 1982)
- Kedestes mohozutza (Wallengren, 1857) - transferred to Nervia mohozutza (Wallengren, 1857)
- Kedestes nancy Collins & Larsen, 1991 - transferred to Nervia nancy (Collins & Larsen, 1991)
- Kedestes nerva (Fabricius, 1793) - transferred to Nervia nerva (Fabricius, 1793))
- Kedestes pinheyi Hancock & Gardiner, 1982 - transferred to Nervia pinheyi (Hancock & Gardiner, 1982)
- Kedestes protensa Butler, 1901 - transferred to Nervia protensa (Butler, 1901)
- Kedestes sarahae Henning & Henning, 1998 - transferred to Trida sarahae (Henning & Henning, 1998)
- Kedestes wallengrenii (Trimen, 1883) - transferred to Nervia wallengrenii (Trimen, 1883)
