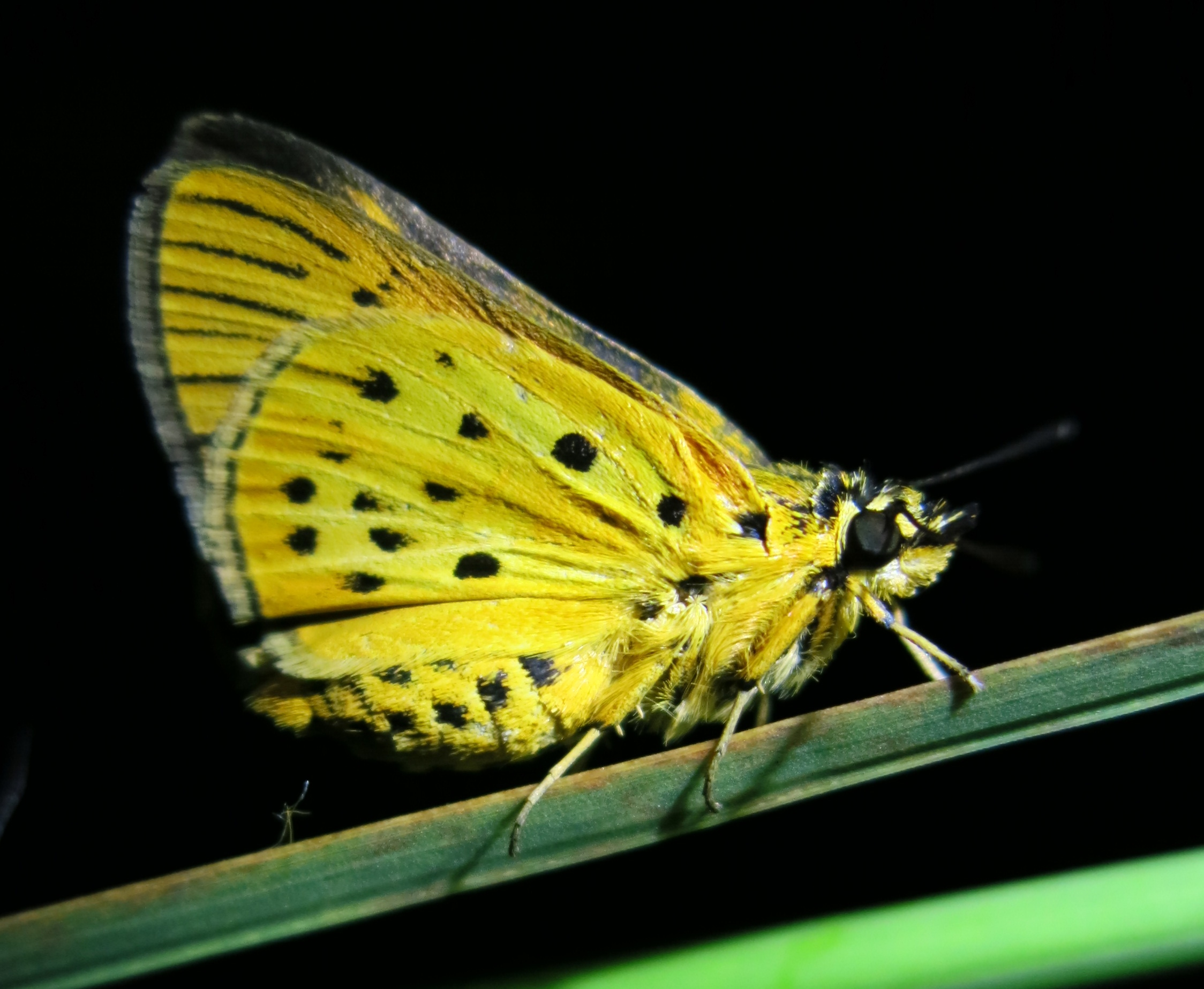
- Imago in the Soutpansberg

Conservation status
- Least Concern (IUCN 3.1)

Scientific classification
- Kingdom: Animalia
- Phylum: Arthropoda
- Class: Insecta
- Order: Lepidoptera
- Family: Hesperiidae
- Genus: Kedestes
- Species: K. macomo

Binomial name
- Kedestes macomo (Trimen, 1862)

Synonyms
- Cyclopides macomo Trimen, 1862

= Kedestes macomo =

Macomo ranger

Species of butterfly

Kedestes macomo, the Macomo ranger, is a butterfly of the family Hesperiidae. It is found from Nigeria to Transvaal, East Cape, KwaZulu-Natal, Mozambique and Zimbabwe. It is also found in Somalia.

The wingspan is 28–32 mm for males and 33–35 mm for females. There are several generations per year, but it is scarce in winter, peaks occur in late summer and autumn.

The larvae feed on a grass species, Imperata cylindrica.

Kedestes macomo f. marshalli Aurivillius, 1925 is now deemed a full species, Kedestes marshalli.
