= Scopula griseolineata =

Scientific classification
- Domain: Eukaryota
- Kingdom: Animalia
- Phylum: Arthropoda
- Class: Insecta
- Order: Lepidoptera
- Family: Geometridae
- Genus: Scopula
- Species: S. griseolineata

Binomial name
- Scopula griseolineata (Rothschild, 1915)

Synonyms
- Acidalia griseolineata Rothschild, 1915

Species of geometer moth in subfamily Sterrhinae

Scopula griseolineata is a moth of the family Geometridae. It is found in New Guinea.

== Taxonomy ==
Scopula griseolineata is a junior secondary homonym of Sterrha griseolineata described by Warren in 1900 and requires a replacement name.
