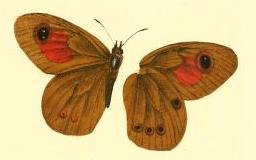

Scientific classification
- Domain: Eukaryota
- Kingdom: Animalia
- Phylum: Arthropoda
- Class: Insecta
- Order: Lepidoptera
- Family: Nymphalidae
- Genus: Neita
- Species: N. neita

Binomial name
- Neita neita (Wallengren, 1875)

Synonyms
- Pseudonympha neita Wallengren, 1875

= Neita neita =

Species of butterfly

Neita neita, the Neita brown, is a butterfly of the family Nymphalidae. It is found in South Africa in several isolated populations in grassland and grassy savanna covered hillsides from Eastern Cape into KwaZulu-Natal, Swaziland, Mpumalanga, Limpopo and North West.

The wingspan is 45–50 mm for males and 45–58 mm for females. Adults are on wing from October to March (with a peak in December). There is a single extended generation per year.

The larvae probably feed on Poaceae grasses.
