= Lecithocera anthologella =

Scientific classification
- Kingdom: Animalia
- Phylum: Arthropoda
- Class: Insecta
- Order: Lepidoptera
- Family: Lecithoceridae
- Genus: Lecithocera
- Species: L. anthologella

Binomial name
- Lecithocera anthologella Wallengren, 1875

Species of moth in genus Lecithocera

Lecithocera anthologella is a moth in the family Lecithoceridae. It was described by Wallengren in 1875. It is found in South Africa.
