= Schizonycha lepidophora =

Scientific classification
- Kingdom: Animalia
- Phylum: Arthropoda
- Clade: Pancrustacea
- Class: Insecta
- Order: Coleoptera
- Suborder: Polyphaga
- Infraorder: Scarabaeiformia
- Family: Scarabaeidae
- Genus: Schizonycha
- Species: S. lepidophora

Binomial name
- Schizonycha lepidophora Moser, 1914

Species of beetle

Schizonycha lepidophora is a species of beetle of the family Scarabaeidae. It is found in Angola.

== Description ==
Adults reach a length of about 12–13 mm (0.47–0.51 in). They are similar to Schizonycha squamifera, but immediately distinguished by the shape of the scales. These are ovoid on the upper surface, somewhat narrower in males than in females. The head is wrinkled and punctate, the clypeus keel is projecting in the middle, the anterior margin of the clypeus is flatly rounded, not emarginate. The pronotum is more than twice as wide as long, densely covered with punctures in females, and somewhat more sparsely in males. The lateral margins are weakly serrated, the anterior and posterior angles are obtuse. The elytra are weakly wrinkled, the ovoid scales are moderately dense and point forward. The pygidium shows, besides very fine and dense punctation, larger, less densely spaced, scaled punctures. The thorax and abdomen are widely punctate in the middle, somewhat more densely punctured at the sides.
