= Kedestes lepenula =

Conservation status
- Least Concern (IUCN 3.1)

Scientific classification
- Kingdom: Animalia
- Phylum: Arthropoda
- Class: Insecta
- Order: Lepidoptera
- Family: Hesperiidae
- Genus: Kedestes
- Species: K. lepenula

Binomial name
- Kedestes lepenula (Wallengren, 1857)

Synonyms
- Kedestes lepedula (missp.); Hesperia lepenula Wallengren, 1857; Cyclopides chersias Hewitson, 1877

Species of butterfly

Kedestes lepenula, the chequered ranger or chequered skipper, is a butterfly of the family Hesperiidae. It is found from the central East Cape through the western part of the Free State, the eastern part of North West Province into the dry western parts of the Limpopo Province up to Polokwane. It is also found in Botswana.

The wingspan is 27 to 29 mm (1.06 to 1.14 in) for males and 30 to 33 mm (1.18 to 1.30 in) for females. There are several generations per year, but it is scarce in September. It is more common during summer with a peak from February to April.

The larvae feed on Imperata cylindrica.
