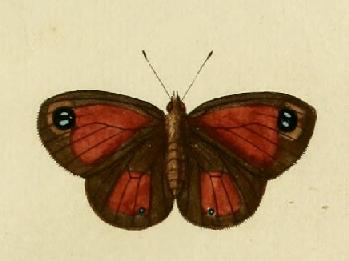
- Pseudonympha hippia

Scientific classification
- Domain: Eukaryota
- Kingdom: Animalia
- Phylum: Arthropoda
- Class: Insecta
- Order: Lepidoptera
- Family: Nymphalidae
- Tribe: Satyrini
- Genus: Pseudonympha; Wallengren, 1857

Type species
- Papilio hippia Cramer, [1779]

Diversity
- 15-17 species

Synonyms
- Paternympha Henning & Henning, 1997

= Pseudonympha =

Genus of butterflies

Pseudonympha is a genus of butterflies from the subfamily Satyrinae in the family Nymphalidae.

== Species ==
- Pseudonympha arnoldi van Son, 1941
- Pseudonympha cyclops van Son, 1955
- Pseudonympha gaika Riley, 1938
- Pseudonympha hippia (Cramer, [1779])
- Pseudonympha loxophthalma Vári, 1971
- Pseudonympha machacha Riley, 1938
- Pseudonympha magoides van Son, 1955
- Pseudonympha magus (Fabricius, 1793)
- Pseudonympha narycia Wallengren, 1857
- Pseudonympha paludis Riley, 1938
- Pseudonympha paragaika Vári, 1971
- Pseudonympha penningtoni Riley, 1938
- Pseudonympha poetula Trimen, 1891
- Pseudonympha southeyi Pennington, 1953
- Pseudonympha swanepoeli van Son, 1955
- Pseudonympha trimenii Butler, 1868
- Pseudonympha varii van Son, 1955
