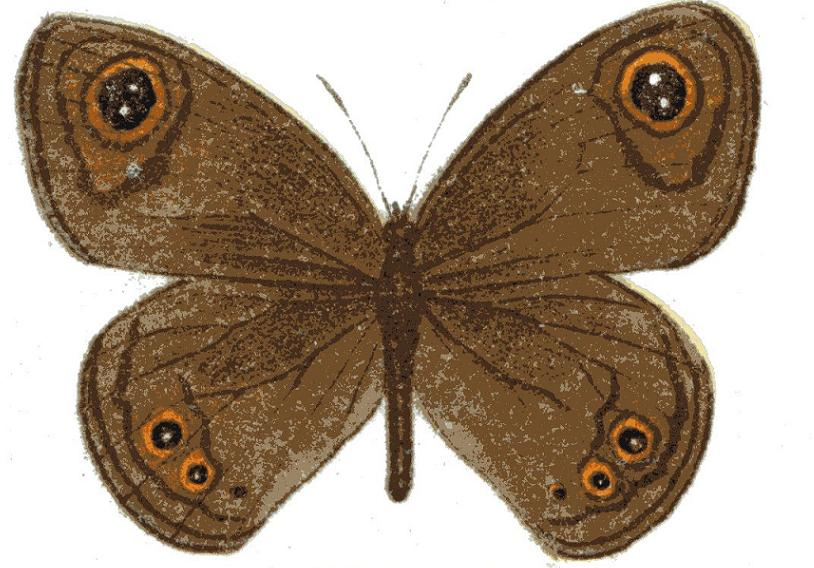
- Neita extensa

Scientific classification
- Domain: Eukaryota
- Kingdom: Animalia
- Phylum: Arthropoda
- Class: Insecta
- Order: Lepidoptera
- Family: Nymphalidae
- Tribe: Satyrini
- Genus: Neita van Son, 1955

Type species
- Pseudonympha neita Wallengren, 1875

Diversity
- Six species

= Neita =

Genus of butterflies

Neita is a genus of butterflies from the subfamily Satyrinae in the family Nymphalidae.

== Species ==
- Neita durbani (Trimen, 1887)
- Neita extensa (Butler, 1898)
- Neita lotenia (van Son, 1949)
- Neita neita (Wallengren, 1875)
- Neita orbipalus Kielland, 1990
- Neita victoriae (Aurivillius, 1899)
