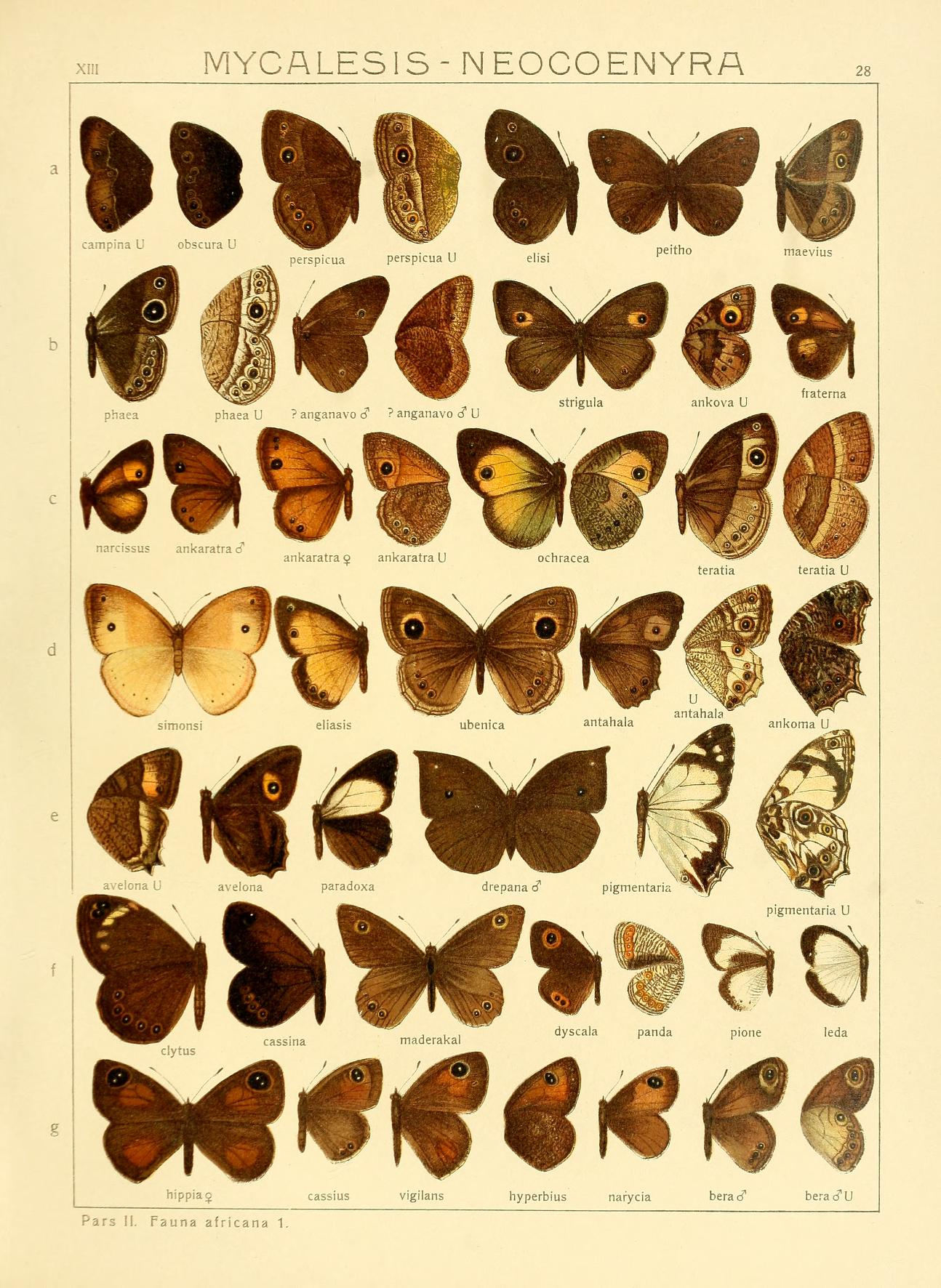
- In Adalbert Seitz's Fauna Africana

Scientific classification
- Domain: Eukaryota
- Kingdom: Animalia
- Phylum: Arthropoda
- Class: Insecta
- Order: Lepidoptera
- Family: Nymphalidae
- Genus: Pseudonympha
- Species: P. narycia

Binomial name
- Pseudonympha narycia Wallengren, 1857

Synonyms
- Paternympha narycia Wallengren, 1857

= Pseudonympha narycia =

Species of butterfly

Pseudonympha narycia, the spotted-eye brown or small hillside brown, is a butterfly of the family Nymphalidae. It is found in South Africa, from the Northern Cape north to Vryburg, east Gauteng and North West, Limpopo, south to Free State, KwaZulu-Natal and the Eastern Cape. It is also present in Zimbabwe.

The wingspan is 40–44 mm for males and 42–47 mm for females. Adults are on wing from October to December and from January to April. There are two generations per year.

The larvae probably feed on Poaceae grasses.
