= Pseudonympha southeyi =

Scientific classification
- Kingdom: Animalia
- Phylum: Arthropoda
- Clade: Pancrustacea
- Class: Insecta
- Order: Lepidoptera
- Family: Nymphalidae
- Genus: Pseudonympha
- Species: P. southeyi

Binomial name
- Pseudonympha southeyi (Pennington, 1953)

Synonyms
- Melampius southeyi Pennington, 1953

Species of butterfly

Pseudonympha southeyi, or Southey's brown, is a butterfly of the family Nymphalidae. It is found in South Africa.

The wingspan is 46–48 mm for males and 48–52 mm for females. Adults are on wing from September to December in most of the range but earlier in the south. There is one generation per year.

The larvae probably feed on Poaceae grasses.

== Subspecies ==
- Pseudonympha southeyi southeyi (the Witteberge Mountains in the north-eastern Cape)
- Pseudonympha southeyi wykehami Dickson, 1967 (the Western Wagenbooms Bergen in the Western Cape)
- Pseudonympha southeyi kamiesbergensis Dickson, 1967 (the Kamiesberg Mountains in the Northern Cape)
