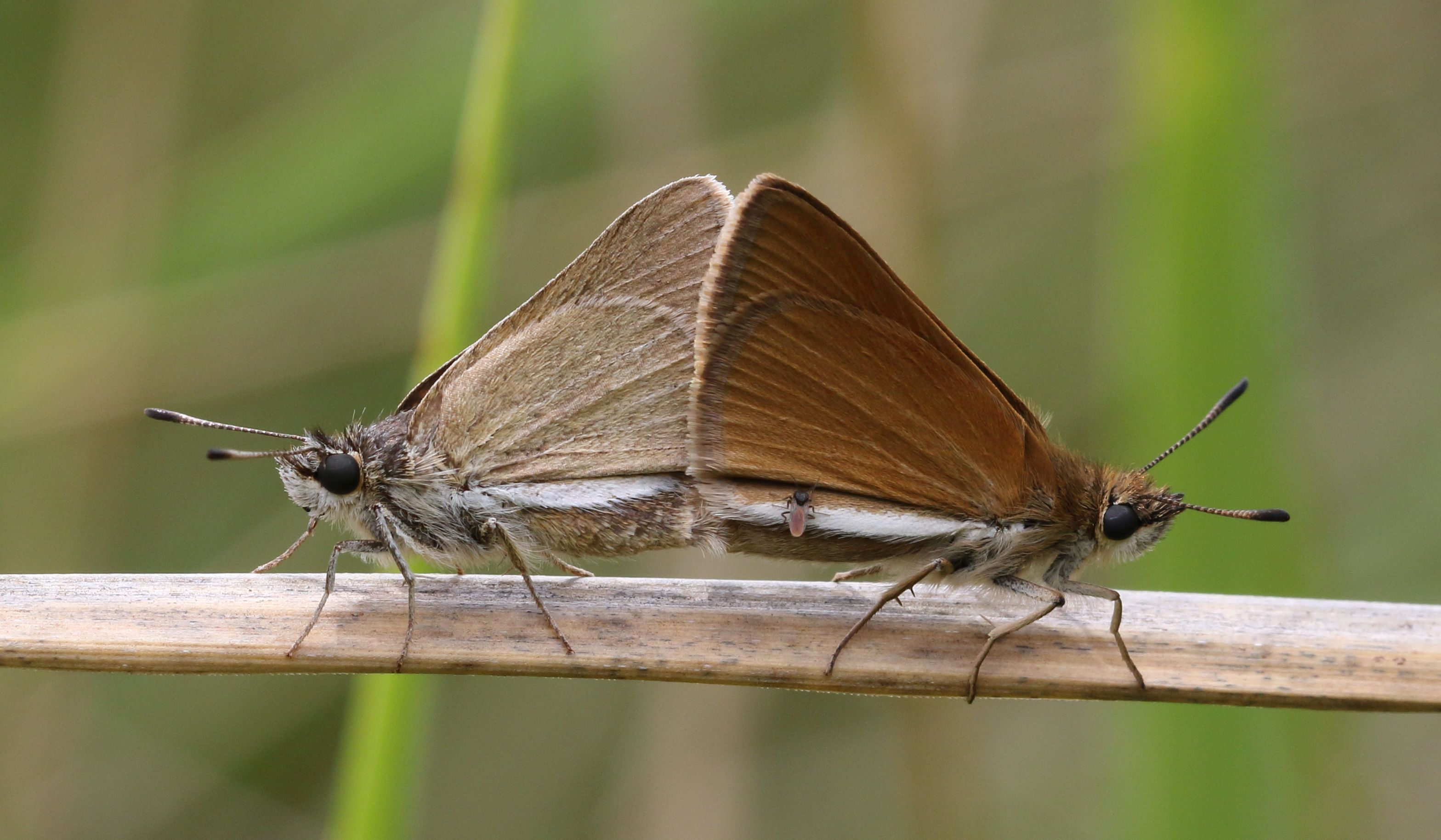
- Mating pair

Scientific classification
- Domain: Eukaryota
- Kingdom: Animalia
- Phylum: Arthropoda
- Class: Insecta
- Order: Lepidoptera
- Family: Hesperiidae
- Genus: Kedestes
- Species: K. lenis

Binomial name
- Kedestes lenis Riley, 1932

= Kedestes lenis =

Species of butterfly

Kedestes lenis, the unique ranger, is a butterfly of the family Hesperiidae. It is found in South Africa.

The wingspan is 26–31 mm for males and 29–35 mm for females. Adults are on wing from October to March (with a peak in spring for subspecies K. l. lenis and in midsummer for subspecies K. l. alba). There is one generation per year.

The larvae feed on Imperata cylindrica and Imperata arundinacea.

== Subspecies ==
- Kedestes lenis lenis (Strandfontein east of Muizenberg in West Cape)
- Kedestes lenis alba Henning, Henning, Joannou & Woodhall, 1997 (mountains in northern East Cape and Orange Free State, and along the south-eastern foothills of the Drakensberg in KwaZulu-Natal)
