= Stygionympha irrorata =

Scientific classification
- Domain: Eukaryota
- Kingdom: Animalia
- Phylum: Arthropoda
- Class: Insecta
- Order: Lepidoptera
- Family: Nymphalidae
- Subfamily: Satyrinae
- Tribe: Satyrini
- Genus: Stygionympha
- Species: S. irrorata

Binomial name
- Stygionympha irrorata (Trimen, 1873)

Synonyms
- Erebia irrorata Trimen, 1873

Species of butterfly

Stygionympha irrorata, the Karoo brown, is a butterfly of the family Nymphalidae. It is found in South Africa, it is widespread in the Nama Karoo areas of Northern Cape, the southern parts of Free State, the northern part of the Western Cape and the Eastern Cape.

The wingspan is 32–36 mm. Adults are on wing from September to November in winter rainfall areas and from September to May in summer rainfall areas. There is one generation per year, although there might be two generations in summer rainfall areas.

The larvae feed on Poaceae grasses.
