= Stygionympha geraldi =

Scientific classification
- Domain: Eukaryota
- Kingdom: Animalia
- Phylum: Arthropoda
- Class: Insecta
- Order: Lepidoptera
- Family: Nymphalidae
- Subfamily: Satyrinae
- Tribe: Satyrini
- Genus: Stygionympha
- Species: S. geraldi

Binomial name
- Stygionympha geraldi Pennington, 1970

Species of butterfly

Stygionympha geraldi, or Gerald's brown, is a butterfly of the family Nymphalidae. It is found in South Africa, in succulent Karoo areas inland from the Northern Cape coast.

The wingspan is 32–36 mm. Adults are on wing from September to October. There is one generation per year.

The larvae probably feed on Poaceae grasses.
