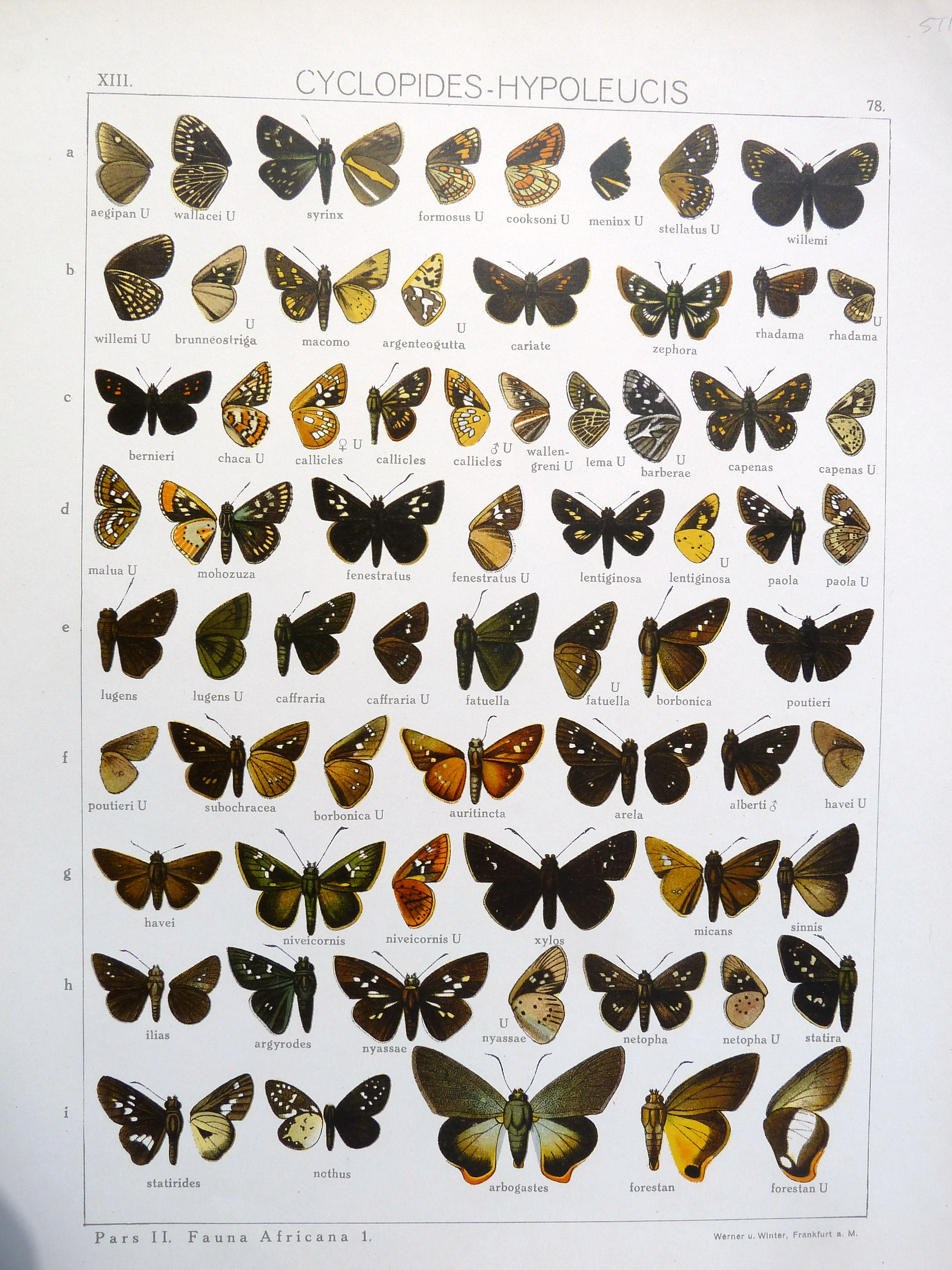

Scientific classification
- Domain: Eukaryota
- Kingdom: Animalia
- Phylum: Arthropoda
- Class: Insecta
- Order: Lepidoptera
- Family: Hesperiidae
- Genus: Kedestes
- Species: K. brunneostriga

Binomial name
- Kedestes brunneostriga (Plötz, 1884)

Synonyms
- Cyclopides brunneostriga Plötz, 1884

= Kedestes brunneostriga =

Species of butterfly

Kedestes brunneostriga is a butterfly in the family Hesperiidae. It is found in the Republic of the Congo, Angola, the Democratic Republic of the Congo (Shaba), Uganda, Kenya, Tanzania, Malawi and Zambia (from the north-western part of the country to the Copperbelt).

The larvae feed on Setaria species.
