= Stygionympha curlei =

Scientific classification
- Domain: Eukaryota
- Kingdom: Animalia
- Phylum: Arthropoda
- Class: Insecta
- Order: Lepidoptera
- Family: Nymphalidae
- Subfamily: Satyrinae
- Tribe: Satyrini
- Genus: Stygionympha
- Species: S. curlei

Binomial name
- Stygionympha curlei Henning & Henning, 1996

Species of butterfly

Stygionympha curlei, or Curle's brown, is a butterfly of the family Nymphalidae. It is found in South Africa, at high altitudes ranging from 1,500 to 2,000 meters along the Drakensberg mountain-range in northern KwaZulu-Natal and Mpumalanga.

The wingspan is 43–48 mm for males and 45–48 mm for females. Adults are on wing from December to January. There is one generation per year.

The larvae probably feed on Poaceae grasses or Cyperaceae sedges.
