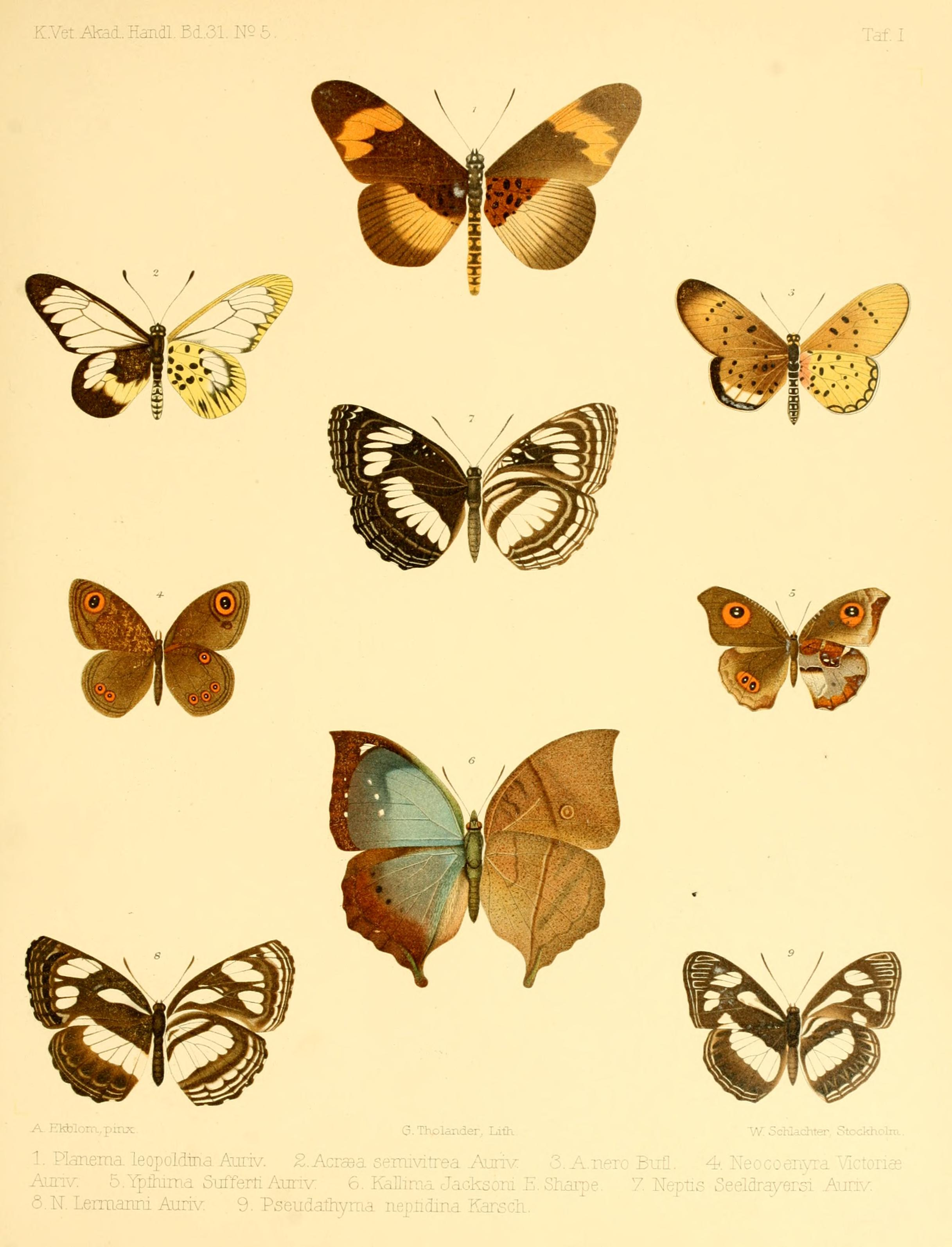
- 'Neita victoriae in Rhopalocera Aethiopica Aurivillius, 1899 (4)

Scientific classification
- Domain: Eukaryota
- Kingdom: Animalia
- Phylum: Arthropoda
- Class: Insecta
- Order: Lepidoptera
- Family: Nymphalidae
- Genus: Neita
- Species: N. victoriae

Binomial name
- Neita victoriae (Aurivillius, 1899)

Synonyms
- Neocoenyra victoriae Aurivillius, 1899

= Neita victoriae =

Species of butterfly

Neita victoriae is a butterfly in the family Nymphalidae. It is found in Tanzania (the southern shores of Lake Victoria) and south-western Kenya. The habitat consists of Brachystegia woodland.
