= Scopula gazellaria =

Scientific classification
- Kingdom: Animalia
- Phylum: Arthropoda
- Clade: Pancrustacea
- Class: Insecta
- Order: Lepidoptera
- Family: Geometridae
- Genus: Scopula
- Species: S. gazellaria

Binomial name
- Scopula gazellaria (Wallengren, 1863)

Synonyms
- Acidalia gazellaria Wallengren, 1863; Acidalia gazella Distant, 1892; Sterrha griseolineata Warren, 1900

Species of geometer moth in subfamily Sterrhinae

Scopula gazellaria is a moth of the family Geometridae. It is found in Lesotho, South Africa and Zimbabwe.
