= Stygionympha dicksoni =

Conservation status
- Critically Endangered (IUCN 3.1)

Scientific classification
- Kingdom: Animalia
- Phylum: Arthropoda
- Clade: Pancrustacea
- Class: Insecta
- Order: Lepidoptera
- Family: Nymphalidae
- Subfamily: Satyrinae
- Tribe: Satyrini
- Genus: Stygionympha
- Species: S. dicksoni

Binomial name
- Stygionympha dicksoni (Riley, 1938)

Synonyms
- Pseudonympha dicksoni Riley, 1938

Species of butterfly

Stygionympha dicksoni, or Dickson's hillside brown, is a butterfly of the family Nymphalidae. It is found in South Africa, in the south-western part of the Western Cape. It was also found at the Tygerberg, but is now extirpated from there.

The wingspan is 34–37 mm for males and 35–38 mm for females. Adults are on wing from September to October. There is one generation per year.

The larvae feed on Poaceae grasses, including Tribolium echinatum.
