= Kedestes straeleni =

Scientific classification
- Domain: Eukaryota
- Kingdom: Animalia
- Phylum: Arthropoda
- Class: Insecta
- Order: Lepidoptera
- Family: Hesperiidae
- Genus: Kedestes
- Species: K. straeleni

Binomial name
- Kedestes straeleni Evans, 1956

Species of butterfly

Kedestes straeleni is a butterfly in the family Hesperiidae. It is found in the south-eastern part of the Democratic Republic of the Congo and north-western and north-eastern Zambia.
