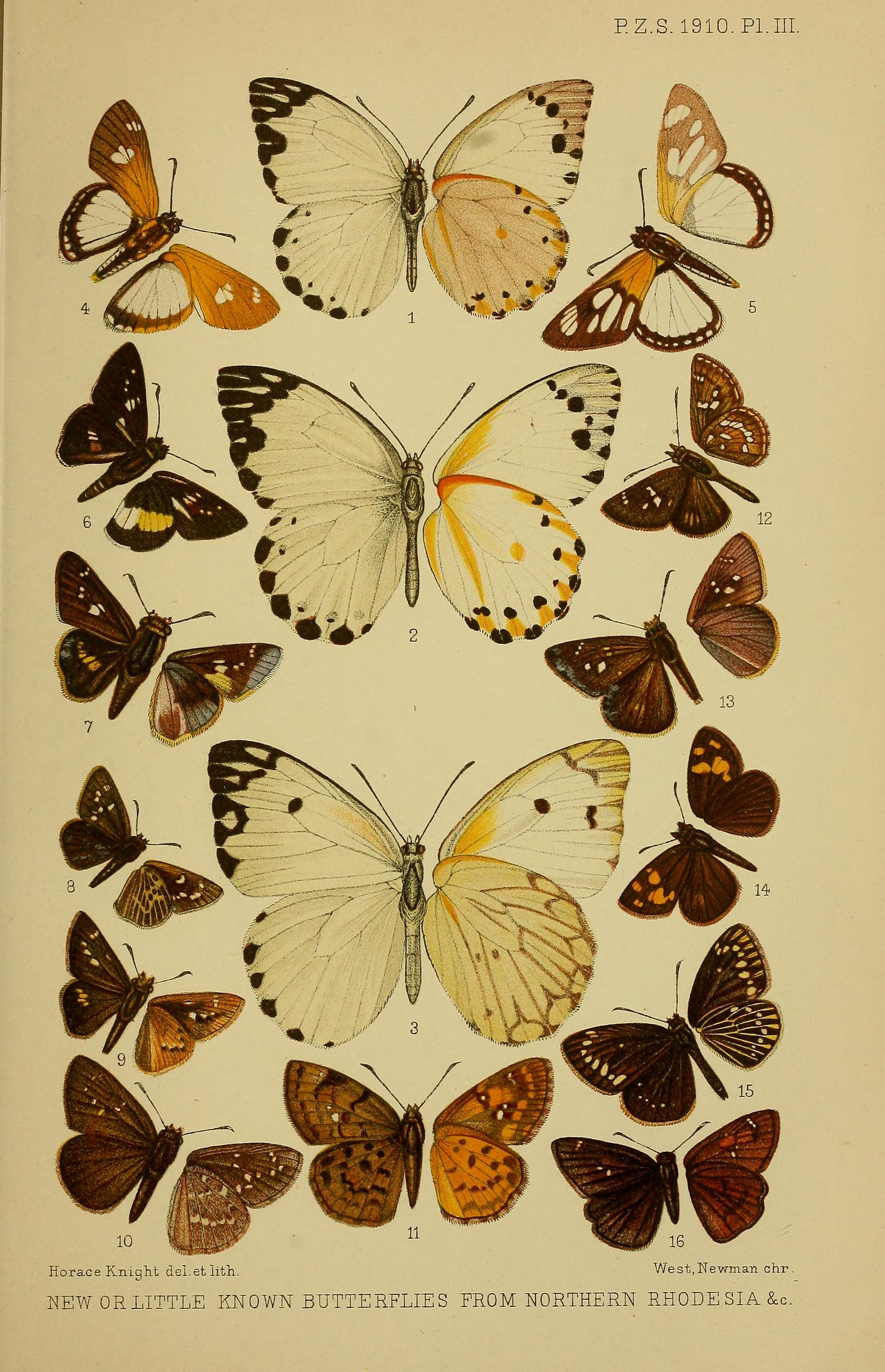
- Kedestes malua figure 12

Scientific classification
- Domain: Eukaryota
- Kingdom: Animalia
- Phylum: Arthropoda
- Class: Insecta
- Order: Lepidoptera
- Family: Hesperiidae
- Genus: Kedestes
- Species: K. malua

Binomial name
- Kedestes malua Neave, 1910

= Kedestes malua =

Species of insect

Kedestes malua is a butterfly in the family Hesperiidae. It is found in north-eastern Zambia.
