= Stygionympha vansoni =

Scientific classification
- Domain: Eukaryota
- Kingdom: Animalia
- Phylum: Arthropoda
- Class: Insecta
- Order: Lepidoptera
- Family: Nymphalidae
- Subfamily: Satyrinae
- Tribe: Satyrini
- Genus: Stygionympha
- Species: S. vansoni

Binomial name
- Stygionympha vansoni (Pennington, 1953)

Synonyms
- Melampias vansoni Pennington, 1953

Species of butterfly

Stygionympha vansoni, also known as Van Son's brown, is a butterfly of the family Nymphalidae. It is found in South Africa, specifically in the Northern Cape, from the Kamiesberge to the Springbok area.

The wingspan is 36–38 mm for males and 38–40 mm for females. Adults are on wing from August to October. There is one generation per year.

The larvae probably feed on Poaceae grasses.
