= Kedestes sublineata =

Scientific classification
- Domain: Eukaryota
- Kingdom: Animalia
- Phylum: Arthropoda
- Class: Insecta
- Order: Lepidoptera
- Family: Hesperiidae
- Genus: Kedestes
- Species: K. sublineata

Binomial name
- Kedestes sublineata Pennington, 1953

Synonyms
- Kedestes lepenula sublineata Pennington, 1953

Species of butterfly

Kedestes sublineata, the black-veined ranger, is a butterfly in the family Hesperiidae. It is found in Namibia. The habitat consists of dry savanna.

Adults are on wing year round, except in the winter months.
