= Pseudonympha poetula =

Conservation status
- Least Concern (IUCN 3.1)

Scientific classification
- Kingdom: Animalia
- Phylum: Arthropoda
- Class: Insecta
- Order: Lepidoptera
- Family: Nymphalidae
- Genus: Pseudonympha
- Species: P. poetula

Binomial name
- Pseudonympha poetula Trimen, 1891

Species of butterfly

Pseudonympha poetula, the Drakenberg brown, is a butterfly of the family Nymphalidae. It is found in South Africa on cool high altitude grassy hills and summits from the Eastern Cape and KwaZulu-Natal border along the Little Berg Hills. It is also found at high altitudes in the Free State, north along the eastern Mpumalanga hills to Limpopo.

The wingspan is 42–44 mm for males and 43–46 mm for females. Adults are on wing from mid-August to late October. There is one generation per year.

The larvae probably feed on Poaceae grasses.
