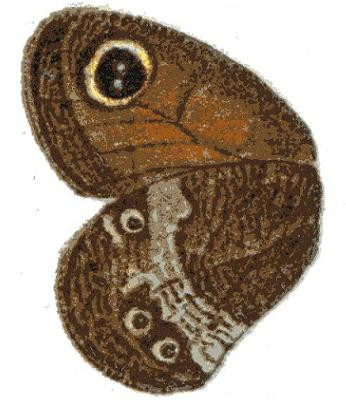

Conservation status
- Least Concern (IUCN 3.1)

Scientific classification
- Kingdom: Animalia
- Phylum: Arthropoda
- Class: Insecta
- Order: Lepidoptera
- Family: Nymphalidae
- Genus: Pseudonympha
- Species: P. magus

Binomial name
- Pseudonympha magus (Fabricius, 1793)

Synonyms
- Papilio magus Fabricius, 1793; Pseudonympha sabacus Trimen 1866

= Pseudonympha magus =

Species of butterfly

Pseudonympha magus, the silver-bottom brown, is a butterfly of the family Nymphalidae. It is found in South Africa, from the Western Cape south to Cape Town and along the southern littoral north to the Eastern Cape.

The wingspan is 40–44 mm for males and females. Adults are on wing from September to April (with a peak in October and February). There are two overlapping generations per year.

The larvae feed on Poaceae grasses, including Cynodon dactylon. Larvae have also been reared on Ehrharta erecta.
