= Stygionympha robertsoni =

Scientific classification
- Domain: Eukaryota
- Kingdom: Animalia
- Phylum: Arthropoda
- Class: Insecta
- Order: Lepidoptera
- Family: Nymphalidae
- Subfamily: Satyrinae
- Tribe: Satyrini
- Genus: Stygionympha
- Species: S. robertson

Binomial name
- Stygionympha robertson (Riley, 1932)

Synonyms
- Pseudonympha vigilans robertsoni Riley, 1932

Species of butterfly

Stygionympha robertsoni, or Robertson's brown, is a butterfly of the family Nymphalidae. It is found in South Africa, in Northern Cape, the southern part of Free State, the northern part of Western Cape and the Eastern Cape.

== Description ==
The wingspan is 38–40 mm. Adults are on wing from August to March. There are probably multiple generations per year.

Individuals based in Witsand feature darker coloration that the specimens from other regions like Free State.

== Habitat and behavior ==
The larvae feed on Poaceae grasses. Larvae have also been reared on Ehrharta erecta.
