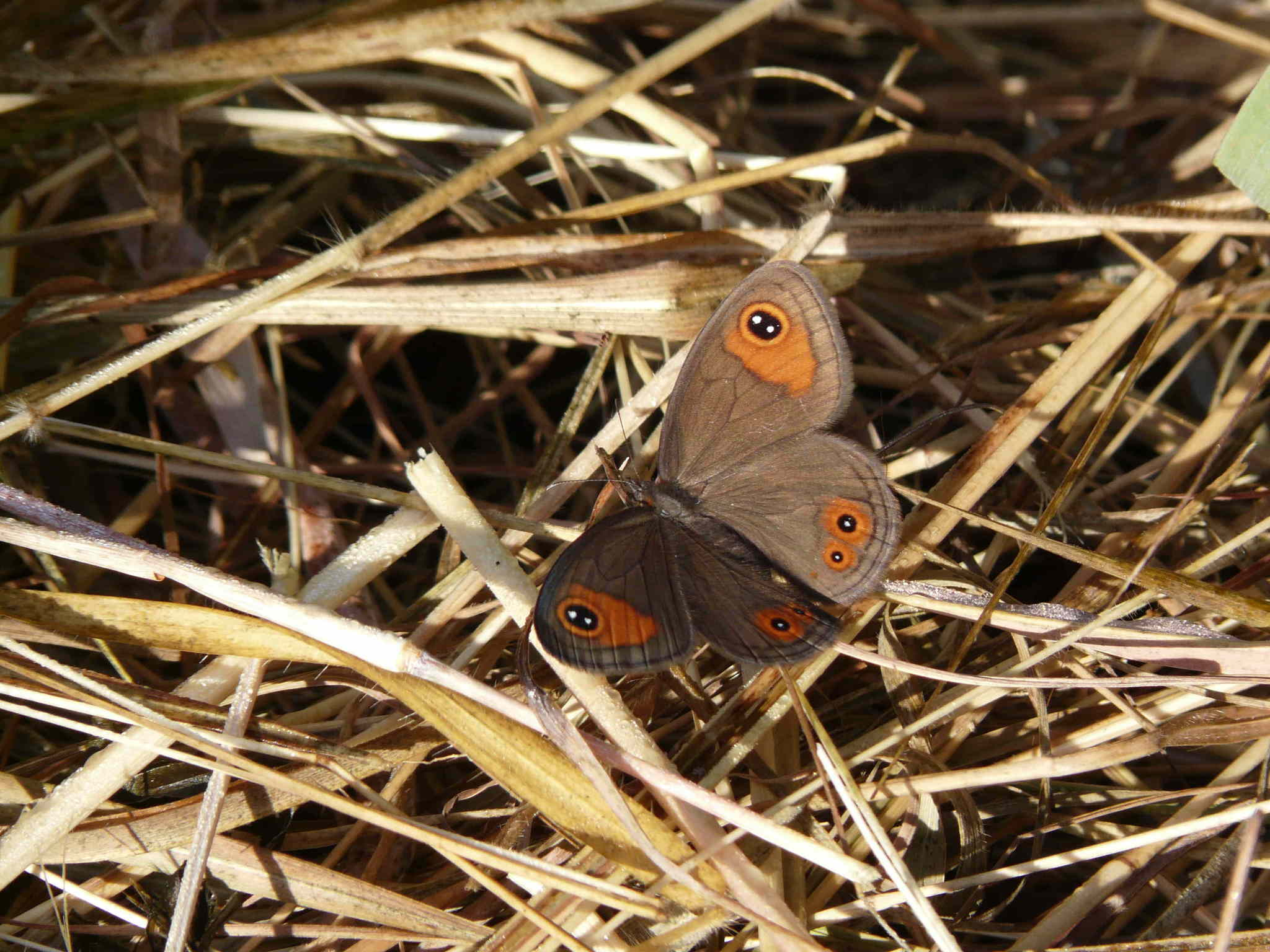

Scientific classification
- Domain: Eukaryota
- Kingdom: Animalia
- Phylum: Arthropoda
- Class: Insecta
- Order: Lepidoptera
- Family: Nymphalidae
- Genus: Neita
- Species: N. extensa

Binomial name
- Neita extensa (Butler, 1898)

Synonyms
- Neocoenyra extensa Butler, 1898; Neocoenyra duplex var. major Trimen, 1906

= Neita extensa =

Species of insect

Neita extensa, is a species of butterfly in the family Nymphalidae. It is found in South Africa from Mpumalanga to Limpopo and further north to Zimbabwe.

The wingspan is 43–48 mm for males and 45–50 mm for females. Adults are on wing from late November to mid-April (with a peak in mid-summer). There is a single extended generation per year.

The larvae probably feed on Poaceae grasses. Larvae have been reared on Ehrharta erecta.
