= Kedestes rogersi =

Scientific classification
- Domain: Eukaryota
- Kingdom: Animalia
- Phylum: Arthropoda
- Class: Insecta
- Order: Lepidoptera
- Family: Hesperiidae
- Genus: Kedestes
- Species: K. rogersi

Binomial name
- Kedestes rogersi Druce, 1907

Species of butterfly

Kedestes rogersi is a butterfly in the family Hesperiidae. It is found in southern Sudan, Uganda, Kenya and northern Tanzania. The habitat consists of dry thornbush and Acacia country.
