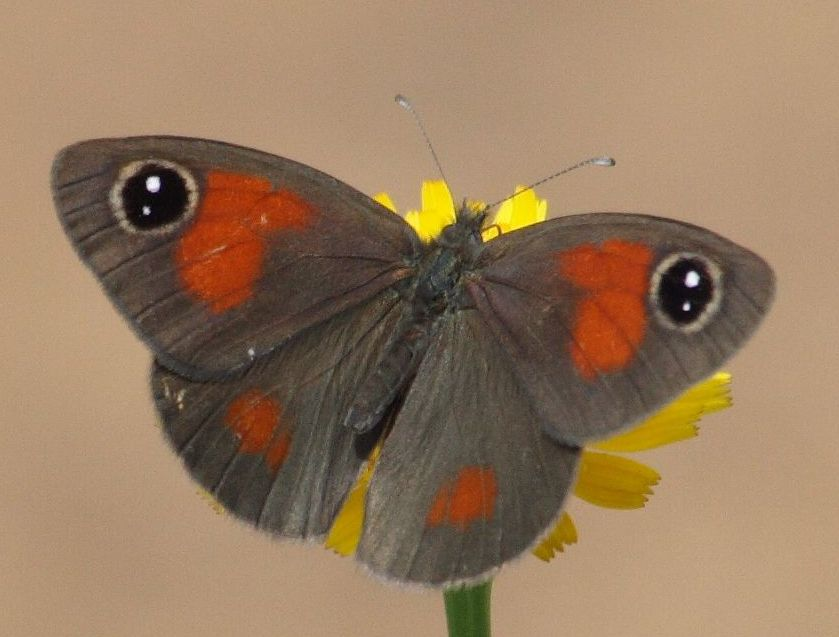
- Stygionympha wichgrafi

Scientific classification
- Kingdom: Animalia
- Phylum: Arthropoda
- Clade: Pancrustacea
- Class: Insecta
- Order: Lepidoptera
- Family: Nymphalidae
- Subfamily: Satyrinae
- Tribe: Satyrini
- Genus: Stygionympha van Son, 1955

Diversity
- Nine species

= Stygionympha =

Genus of butterflies

Stygionympha is a butterfly genus from the subfamily Satyrinae in the family Nymphalidae.

== Species ==
- Stygionympha curlei Henning & Henning, 1996
- Stygionympha dicksoni (Riley, 1938)
- Stygionympha geraldi Pennington, 1970
- Stygionympha irrorata (Trimen, 1873)
- Stygionympha robertsoni (Riley, 1932)
- Stygionympha scotina Quickelberge, 1977
- Stygionympha vansoni (Pennington, 1953)
- Stygionympha vigilans (Trimen, 1887)
- Stygionympha wichgrafi van Son, 1955
