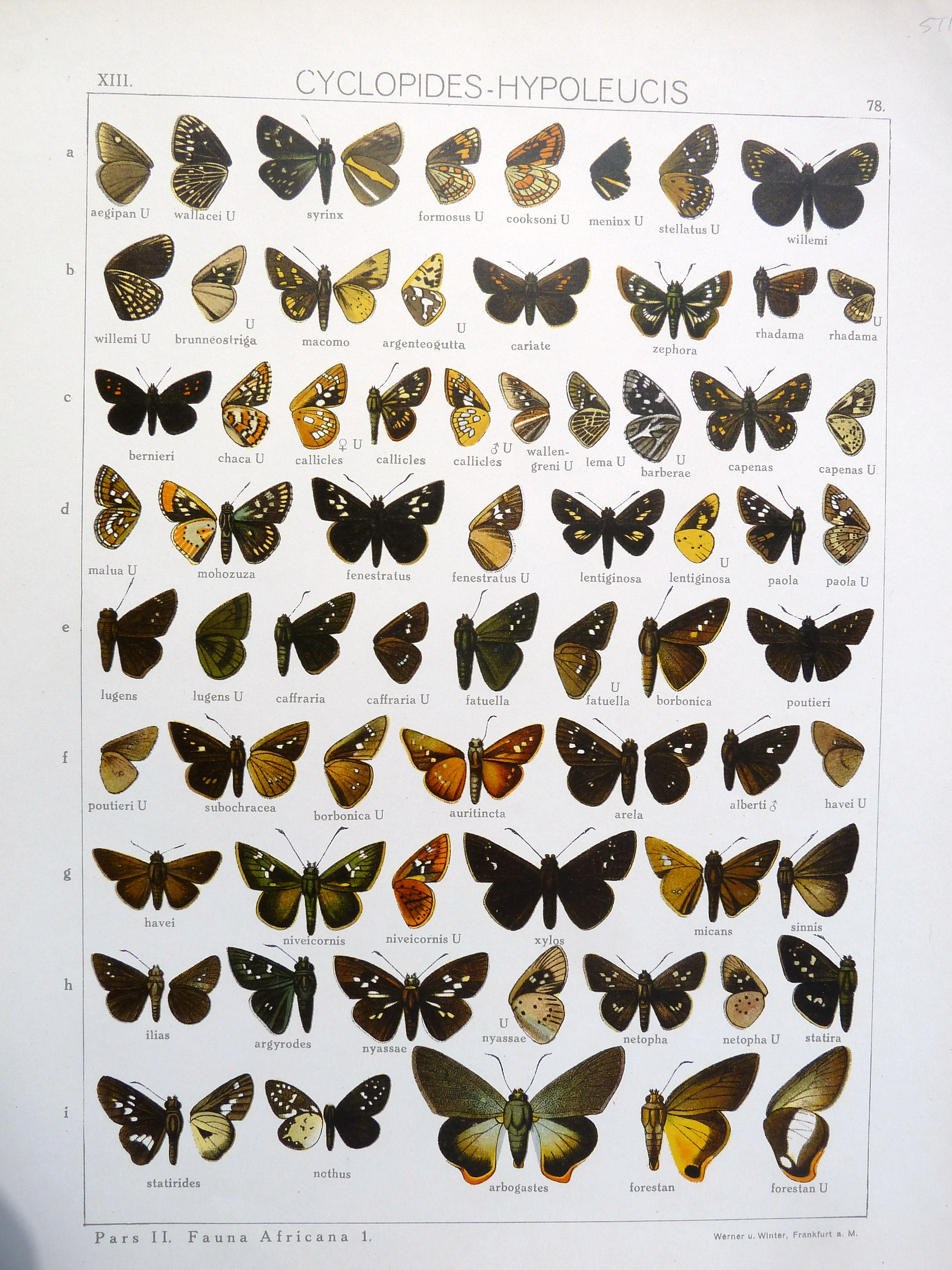

Conservation status
- Least Concern (IUCN 3.1)

Scientific classification
- Kingdom: Animalia
- Phylum: Arthropoda
- Class: Insecta
- Order: Lepidoptera
- Family: Hesperiidae
- Genus: Nervia
- Species: N. mohozutza

Binomial name
- Nervia mohozutza (Wallengren, 1857)

Synonyms
- Hesperia mohozutza Wallengren, 1857; Kedestes mohozutza (Wallengren, 1857)

= Nervia mohozutza =

Species of butterfly

Nervia mohozutza, the fulvous ranger or harlequin skipper, is a species of butterfly in the family Hesperiidae. It is found from South Africa to Kenya, Zaire and Uganda.

The wingspan is 27–31 mm for males and 33–42 mm for females. Adults are on wing from November to March (with a peak from November to December). There is one generation per year.
