= Pseudonympha arnoldi =

Scientific classification
- Domain: Eukaryota
- Kingdom: Animalia
- Phylum: Arthropoda
- Class: Insecta
- Order: Lepidoptera
- Family: Nymphalidae
- Genus: Pseudonympha
- Species: P. arnoldi

Binomial name
- Pseudonympha arnoldi van Son, 1941

Species of butterfly

Pseudonympha arnoldi, or Arnold's brown, is a butterfly in the family Nymphalidae. It is found in north-eastern Zimbabwe. The habitat consists of damp spots in montane grassland.

Adults have been recorded in February.
