= Pseudonympha loxophthalma =

Scientific classification
- Domain: Eukaryota
- Kingdom: Animalia
- Phylum: Arthropoda
- Class: Insecta
- Order: Lepidoptera
- Family: Nymphalidae
- Genus: Pseudonympha
- Species: P. loxophthalma

Binomial name
- Pseudonympha loxophthalma (Vári, 1971)

Synonyms
- Pseudonympha narycia loxophthalma Vári, 1971; Paternympha loxophthalma

Species of butterfly

Pseudonympha loxophthalma, the big-eye brown, is a butterfly of the family Nymphalidae. It is found in South Africa, the Strydpoortberg, Wolkberg and Waterberg in Limpopo.

The wingspan is 38–42 mm for males and 40–45 mm for females. Adults are on wing from October to December and from January to April. There are two generations per year.

The larvae probably feed on Poaceae grasses.
