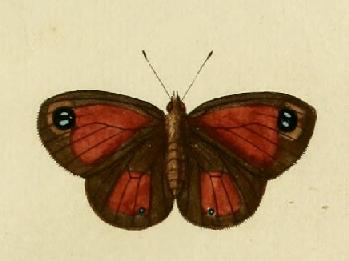

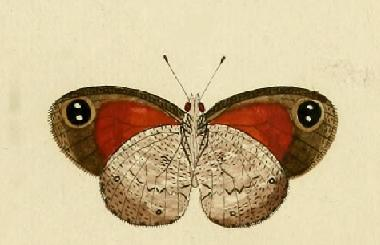

Conservation status
- Least Concern (IUCN 3.1)

Scientific classification
- Kingdom: Animalia
- Phylum: Arthropoda
- Class: Insecta
- Order: Lepidoptera
- Family: Nymphalidae
- Genus: Pseudonympha
- Species: P. hippia

Binomial name
- Pseudonympha hippia (Cramer, [1779])

Synonyms
- Papilio hippia Cramer, [1779]; Hipparchia montana Burchell, 1822

= Pseudonympha hippia =

Species of butterfly

Pseudonympha hippia, or Burchell's brown, is a butterfly of the family Nymphalidae. It is found in South Africa on cool high altitude fynbos covered hills and summits from the Cape Peninsula to the Hottentots Holland Mountains, then along the Riviersonderend Mountains to the Groot Winterhoek.

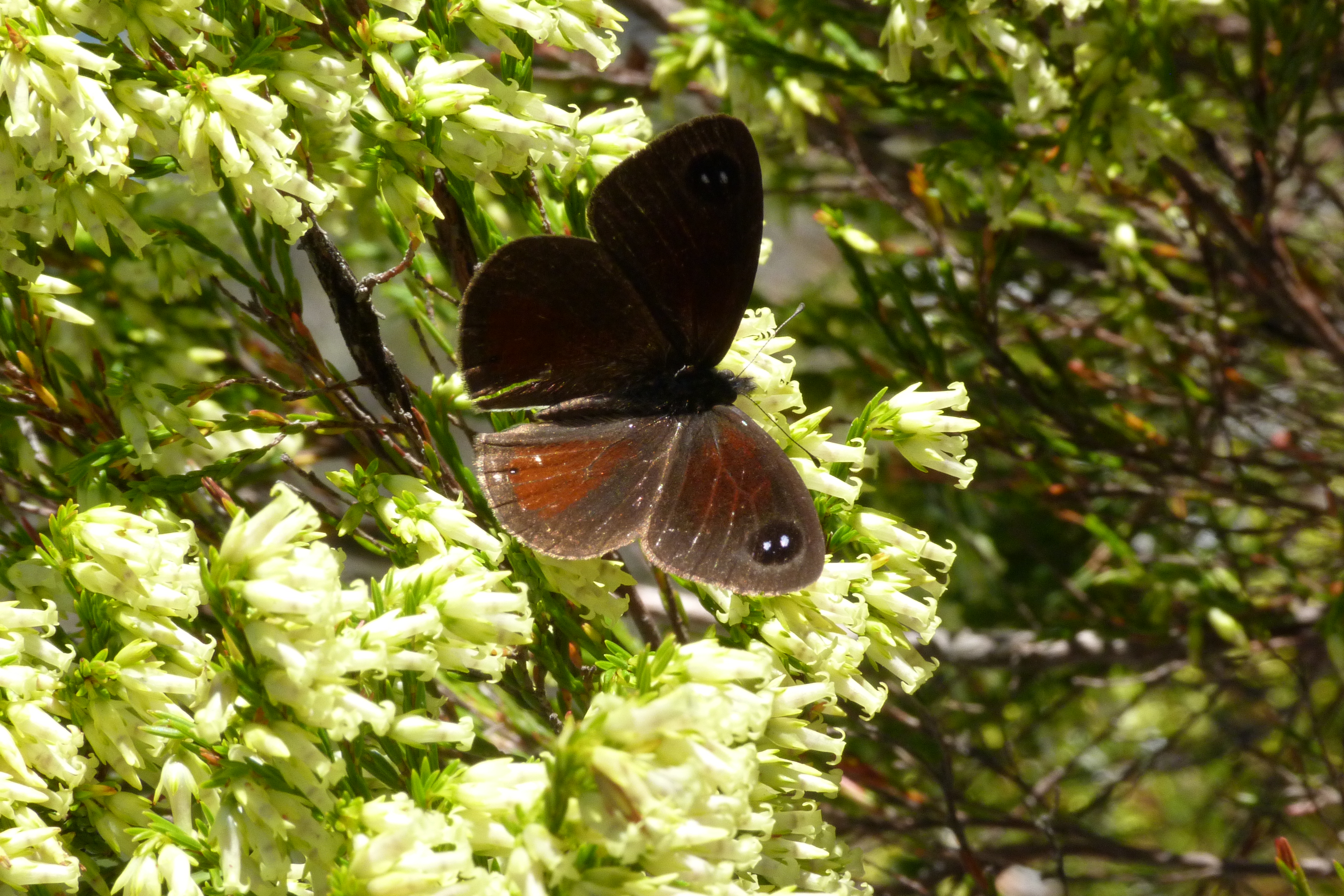

The wingspan is 45–48 mm for males and 46–50 mm for females. Adults are on wing from December to January, sometimes to February or even March. There is one generation per year.

The larvae feed on Poaceae grasses. Larvae have been reared on Ehrharta erecta, Ischrolepsis capensis and Thamnochortus glaber.
