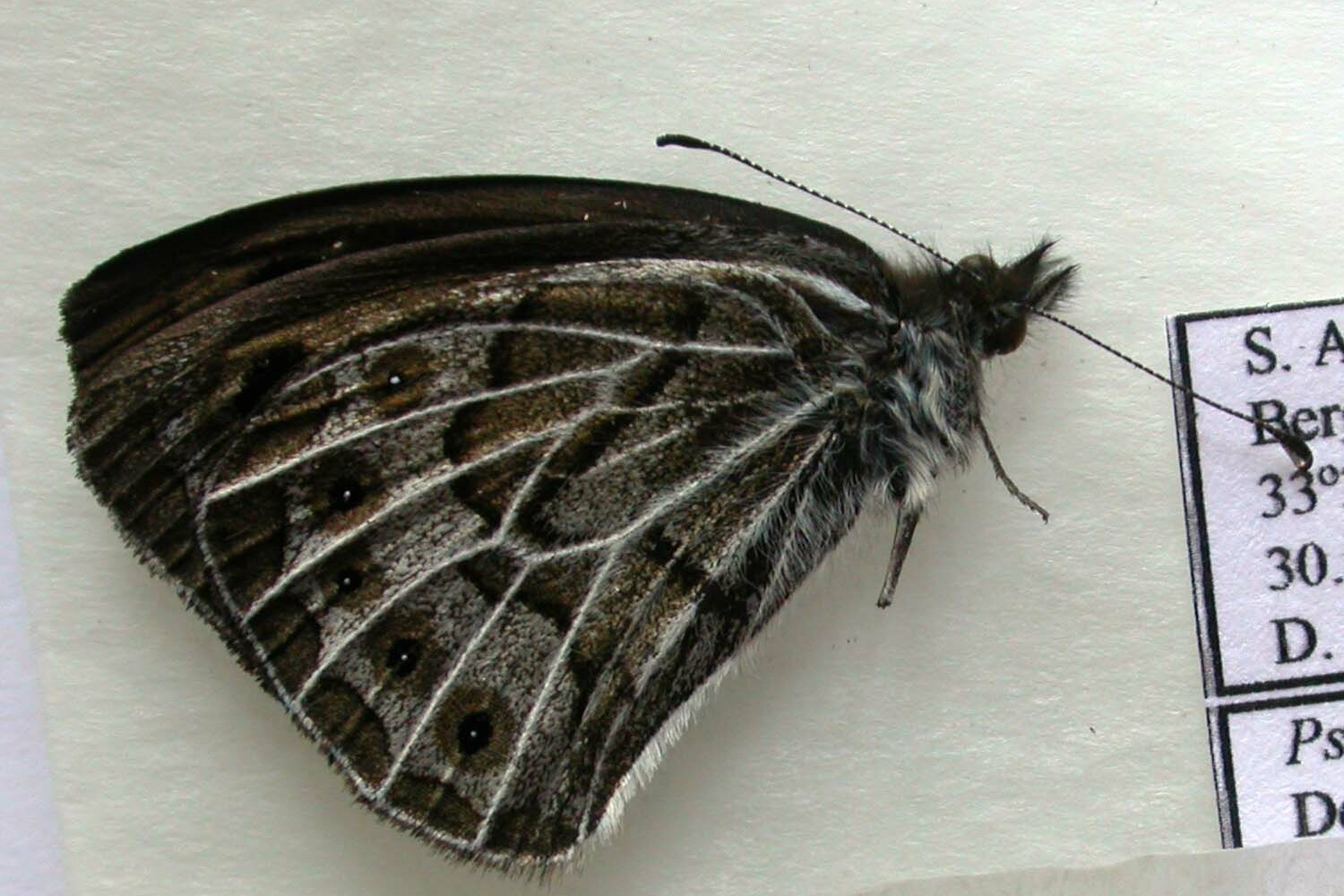

Scientific classification
- Domain: Eukaryota
- Kingdom: Animalia
- Phylum: Arthropoda
- Class: Insecta
- Order: Lepidoptera
- Family: Nymphalidae
- Genus: Pseudonympha
- Species: P. trimenii

Binomial name
- Pseudonympha trimenii Butler, 1868

= Pseudonympha trimenii =

Species of butterfly

Pseudonympha trimenii, or Trimen's brown, is a butterfly of the family Nymphalidae. It is found in South Africa.

The wingspan is 40–52 mm for males and 44–56 mm for females. Adults are on wing from early September to late November. There is one generation per year.

The larvae feed on Poaceae grasses, including Danthonia stricta and other coarse, wiry grasses.

== Subspecies ==
- Pseudonympha trimenii trimenii (south-western Cape)
- Pseudonympha trimenii nieuwveldensis Dickson, 1966 (Nieuwveld Mountains in the south-western Cape)
- Pseudonympha trimenii ruthae Dickson, 1966 (Eastern Cape)
- Pseudonympha trimenii namaquana van Son, 1966 (Northern Cape)
