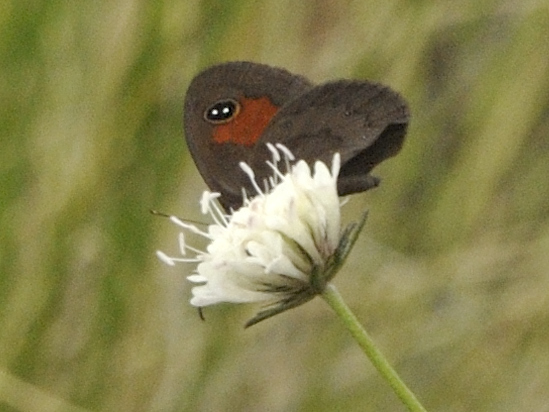

Scientific classification
- Domain: Eukaryota
- Kingdom: Animalia
- Phylum: Arthropoda
- Class: Insecta
- Order: Lepidoptera
- Family: Nymphalidae
- Genus: Neita
- Species: N. durbani

Binomial name
- Neita durbani (Trimen, 1887)

Synonyms
- Pseudonympha D'Urbani Trimen, 1887; Neocoenyra durbani

= Neita durbani =

Species of butterfly

Neita durbani, or D'Urban's brown, is a butterfly of the family Nymphalidae. It is found in South Africa in scattered populations in grasslands in the Eastern Cape and grassy mountain slopes at medium altitude from the Camdeboo Mountains along the escarpment to Bedford and Stutterheim, south to Grahamstown, and north to the Dordrecht Kloof and Jamestown.

The wingspan is 45–48 mm for males and females. Adults are on wing from late October to February (with a peak in mid-summer). There is a single extended generation per year.

The larvae probably feed on Poaceae grasses. Larvae have been reared on Ehrharta erecta.

== Etymology ==
W. S. M. D'Urban, one-time curator of Exeter Museum, discovered this butterfly and the species was named in his honour.
