= Schizonycha squamifera =

Scientific classification
- Kingdom: Animalia
- Phylum: Arthropoda
- Clade: Pancrustacea
- Class: Insecta
- Order: Coleoptera
- Suborder: Polyphaga
- Infraorder: Scarabaeiformia
- Family: Scarabaeidae
- Genus: Schizonycha
- Species: S. squamifera

Binomial name
- Schizonycha squamifera Wallengren, 1881

Synonyms
- Schizonycha liliputana Brenske, 1898

Species of beetle

Schizonycha squamifera is a species of beetle of the family Scarabaeidae. It is found in Namibia and South Africa (Western Cape, KwaZulu-Natal, Free State, Gauteng, Limpopo).

== Description ==
Adults reach a length of about 7.5–13 mm (0.30–0.51 in). They are black, piceous-brown or sometimes chest-nut-brown, and not very shining. The antennae are ferruginous and the tarsi piceous. The outer margin of the pronotum and of the elytra has a fringe of somewhat long cilia, and the pectus is only briefly pubescent.
