= Pseudonympha cyclops =

Scientific classification
- Domain: Eukaryota
- Kingdom: Animalia
- Phylum: Arthropoda
- Class: Insecta
- Order: Lepidoptera
- Family: Nymphalidae
- Genus: Pseudonympha
- Species: P. cyclops

Binomial name
- Pseudonympha cyclops van Son, 1955

Species of butterfly

Pseudonympha cyclops, the cyclops brown, is a butterfly in the family Nymphalidae. It is found in Zimbabwe and Mozambique. The habitat consists of grassy slopes.
