= Pseudonympha paragaika =

Conservation status
- Least Concern (IUCN 3.1)

Scientific classification
- Kingdom: Animalia
- Phylum: Arthropoda
- Class: Insecta
- Order: Lepidoptera
- Family: Nymphalidae
- Genus: Pseudonympha
- Species: P. paragaika

Binomial name
- Pseudonympha paragaika Vári, 1971

Species of butterfly

Pseudonympha paragaika, the Golden Gate brown, is a butterfly of the family Nymphalidae. It is found in South Africa, it has only been recorded from sandstone buttresses on the Golden Gate Highlands in Free State.

The wingspan is 42–46 mm for males and 44–47 mm for females. Adults are on wing from December to January. There is one generation per year.

The larvae probably feed on Poaceae grasses, probably including Merxmuellera species.
