= Pseudonympha swanepoeli =

Conservation status
- Endangered (IUCN 3.1)

Scientific classification
- Kingdom: Animalia
- Phylum: Arthropoda
- Class: Insecta
- Order: Lepidoptera
- Family: Nymphalidae
- Genus: Pseudonympha
- Species: P. swanepoeli

Binomial name
- Pseudonympha swanepoeli van Son, 1955

Species of butterfly

Pseudonympha swanepoeli, or Swanepoel's brown, is a butterfly of the family Nymphalidae. It is found in South Africa, it is only known from Houtbosdorp in Limpopo and Whisky Spruit, the Verloren Vallei, Mount Sheba and Pilgrim's Rest in Mpumalanga.

The wingspan is 46–50 mm for males and 44–48 mm for females. Adults are on wing from February to March in the north and from November to February in the south. There is one generation per year.

The larvae probably feed on Poaceae grasses or Cyperaceae sedges.
