= Nervia protensa =

Scientific classification
- Kingdom: Animalia
- Phylum: Arthropoda
- Clade: Pancrustacea
- Class: Insecta
- Order: Lepidoptera
- Family: Hesperiidae
- Genus: Nervia
- Species: N. protensa

Binomial name
- Nervia protensa (Butler, 1901)

Synonyms
- Kedestes paola protensa; Kedestes chacoides Gaede, 1916; Kedestes protensa Butler, 1901

Species of butterfly

Nervia protensa, the West African ranger, is a species of butterfly in the family Hesperiidae. It is found in Sierra Leone, Ivory Coast, Ghana, Nigeria, northern Cameroon, the Democratic Republic of the Congo, southern Sudan, Uganda, western Tanzania, Zambia (from the north-western part of the country to the Copperbelt) and Angola. The habitat consists of Guinea savanna and open montane areas.
