= Neita lotenia =

Scientific classification
- Domain: Eukaryota
- Kingdom: Animalia
- Phylum: Arthropoda
- Class: Insecta
- Order: Lepidoptera
- Family: Nymphalidae
- Genus: Neita
- Species: N. lotenia

Binomial name
- Neita lotenia (van Son, 1949)

Synonyms
- Melampias lotenia van Son, 1949

Species of butterfly

Neita lotenia, the Loteni brown, is a butterfly of the family Nymphalidae. It is found in South Africa on grassy mountain slopes on high altitude grasslands along the southern and south-eastern KwaZulu-Natal and Lesotho part of the Drakensberg.

The wingspan is 45–48 mm for males and females. Adults are on wing from late November to January. There is one generation per year.

The larvae probably feed on Poaceae grasses.
