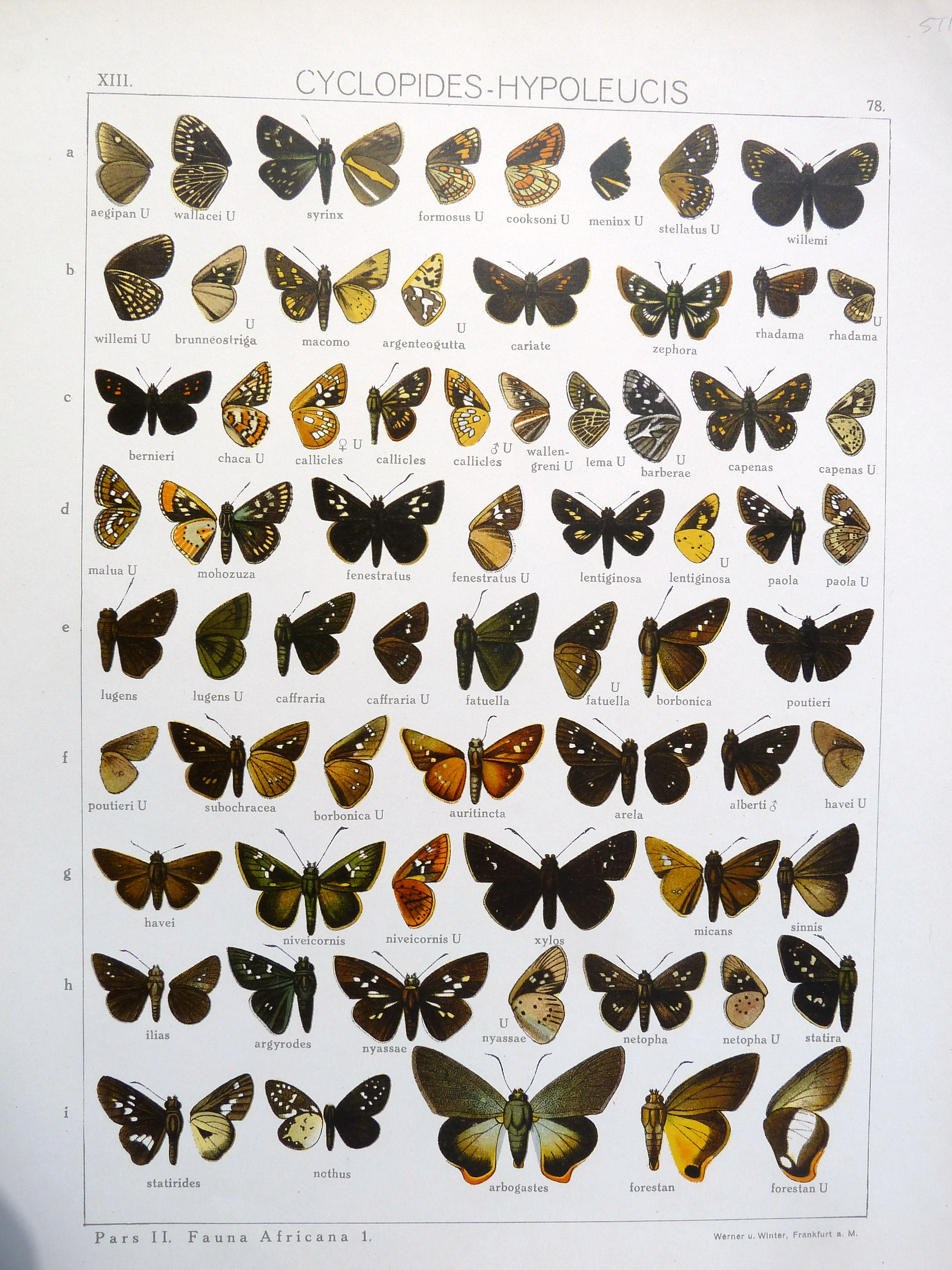
- in Seitz d

Conservation status
- Least Concern (IUCN 3.1)

Scientific classification
- Kingdom: Animalia
- Phylum: Arthropoda
- Class: Insecta
- Order: Lepidoptera
- Family: Hesperiidae
- Genus: Nervia
- Species: N. nerva

Binomial name
- Nervia nerva (Fabricius, 1793)

Synonyms
- List: Hesperia nerva Fabricius, 1793; Pyrgus tucusa Trimen, 1883; Cyclopides paola Plötz, 1884; Kedestes nerva (Fabricius, 1793)

= Nervia nerva =

Species of butterfly

Nervia nerva, the scarce ranger or scarce skipper, is a species of butterfly of the family Hesperiidae. It is found in South Africa (KwaZulu-Natal, Transvaal), Zimbabwe, Angola and north-western Zambia.

The wingspan is 27–31 mm for males and 33–36 mm for females. Adults are on wing from October to November and from February to April. There are two generations per year.

== Subspecies ==
- Nervia nerva nerva - South Africa (Limpopo Province, Mpumalanga, North West Province, Gauteng, Free State Province, KwaZulu-Natal)
- Nervia nerva paola (Plötz, 1884) - Kenya, Tanzania, Angola, Zimbabwe, north-western Zambia
