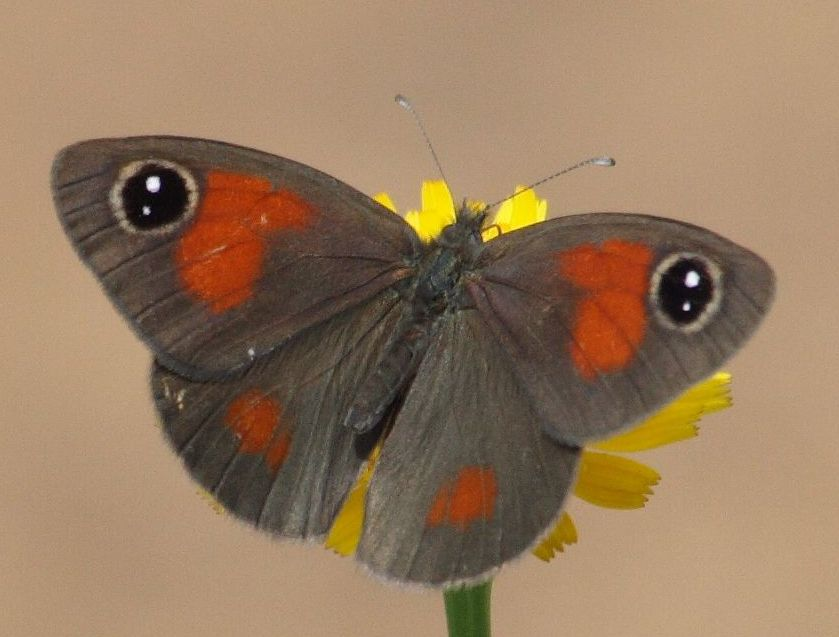
- Stygionympha wichgrafi williami

Scientific classification
- Domain: Eukaryota
- Kingdom: Animalia
- Phylum: Arthropoda
- Class: Insecta
- Order: Lepidoptera
- Family: Nymphalidae
- Subfamily: Satyrinae
- Tribe: Satyrini
- Genus: Stygionympha
- Species: S. wichgrafi

Binomial name
- Stygionympha wichgrafi van Son, 1955

Synonyms
- Pseudonympha vigilans var. johannesburgensis Wichgraf, 1911

= Stygionympha wichgrafi =

Species of butterfly

Stygionympha wichgrafi, or Wichgraf's brown, is a butterfly of the family Nymphalidae. It is found in South Africa, Zimbabwe and Mozambique.

The wingspan is 40–50 mm. Adults are on wing from August to March. There are probably multiple generations per year.

The larvae probably feed on Poaceae grasses.

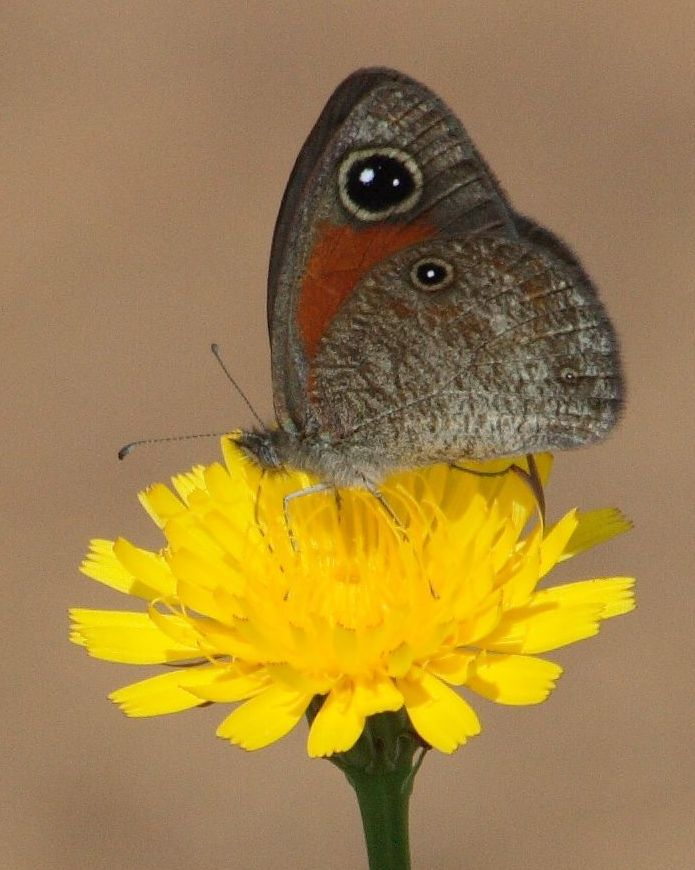
Stygionympha wichgrafi williami

== Subspecies ==
- Stygionympha wichgrafi wichgrafi (hills of Free State, Gauteng, Limpopo, North West and Mpumalanga)
- Stygionympha wichgrafi lannini van Son, 1966 (Zimbabwe, Mozambique)
- Stygionympha wichgrafi williami Henning & Henning, 1996 (KwaZulu-Natal, Free State and from the mountains of Lesotho to the Eastern Cape)
- Stygionympha wichgrafi grisea Henning & Henning, 1996 (low altitude hinterland of the KwaZulu-Natal coast)
