= Pseudonympha magoides =

Conservation status
- Least Concern (IUCN 3.1)

Scientific classification
- Kingdom: Animalia
- Phylum: Arthropoda
- Class: Insecta
- Order: Lepidoptera
- Family: Nymphalidae
- Genus: Pseudonympha
- Species: P. magoides

Binomial name
- Pseudonympha magoides van Son, 1955

Species of butterfly

Pseudonympha magoides, the false silver-bottom brown, is a butterfly of the family Nymphalidae. It is found in South Africa, from the Western Cape to the Eastern Cape, along the Drakensberg foothills into Lesotho, KwaZulu-Natal, Eswatini, Mpumalanga, north to the Wolkberg. It is also found in Free State and Gauteng.

The wingspan is 46–48 mm for males and 44–46 mm for females. Adults are on wing from September to May (with peaks depending on the location). There are two overlapping generations per year.

The larvae feed on Poaceae grasses, including Ehrharta erecta.
