= Kedestes niveostriga =

Scientific classification
- Domain: Eukaryota
- Kingdom: Animalia
- Phylum: Arthropoda
- Class: Insecta
- Order: Lepidoptera
- Family: Hesperiidae
- Genus: Kedestes
- Species: K. niveostriga

Binomial name
- Kedestes niveostriga (Trimen, 1864)

Synonyms
- Pamphila niveostriga Trimen, 1864

Species of butterfly

Kedestes niveostriga, the dark ranger or dark skipper, is a butterfly of the family Hesperiidae. It is only known from the Cederberg mountains in the Western Cape.

The wingspan is 31–35 mm for males and 33–36 mm for females. Adults are on wing from September to November and from February to April in two generations. Subspecies K. n. schloszi is on wing from December to April.

The larvae feed on Imperata cylindrica, Pennisetum macrourum and Pennisetum clandestinum.

== Subspecies ==
- Kedestes niveostriga niveostriga (southern and eastern slopes of East Cape mountains, south-eastern Lesotho and Kwazulu-Natal midlands)
- Kedestes niveostriga schloszi Pringle & Schlosz, 1997 (Riviersonderend Mountains in West Cape)
