= Lepidochrysops oosthuizeni =

Conservation status
- Least Concern (IUCN 3.1)

Scientific classification
- Kingdom: Animalia
- Phylum: Arthropoda
- Class: Insecta
- Order: Lepidoptera
- Family: Lycaenidae
- Genus: Lepidochrysops
- Species: L. oosthuizeni

Binomial name
- Lepidochrysops oosthuizeni Swanepoel & Vári, 1983

Species of butterfly

Lepidochrysops oosthuizeni, Oosthuizen's blue, is a species of butterfly in the family Lycaenidae. It is found in Lesotho and South Africa, where it is found on high altitude grassland and Nama Karoo on the Witteberg in the East Cape and the Maluti Mountains in Lesotho and the eastern Orange Free State.

The wingspan is 33–37 mm for males and 34–38 mm for females. Adults are on wing from December to January. There is one generation per year.

The larvae feed on Selago galpinii.
