= Nervia nancy =

Scientific classification
- Domain: Eukaryota
- Kingdom: Animalia
- Phylum: Arthropoda
- Class: Insecta
- Order: Lepidoptera
- Family: Hesperiidae
- Genus: Nervia
- Species: N. nancy

Binomial name
- Nervia nancy Collins & Larsen, 1991

Synonyms
- Kedestes nancy Collins & Larsen, 1991

Species of butterfly

Nervia nancy is a species of butterfly in the family Hesperiidae. It is found in Kenya (Ukambani country and the Chyulu Hills).
