= Nervia heathi =

Scientific classification
- Domain: Eukaryota
- Kingdom: Animalia
- Phylum: Arthropoda
- Class: Insecta
- Order: Lepidoptera
- Family: Hesperiidae
- Genus: Nervia
- Species: N. heathi

Binomial name
- Nervia heathi (Hancock & Gardiner, 1982)

Synonyms
- Kedestes heathi Hancock & Gardiner, 1982

Species of butterfly

Nervia heathi is a species of butterfly in the family Hesperiidae. It is found in Zambia (from the north-western part of the country to the Copperbelt).
