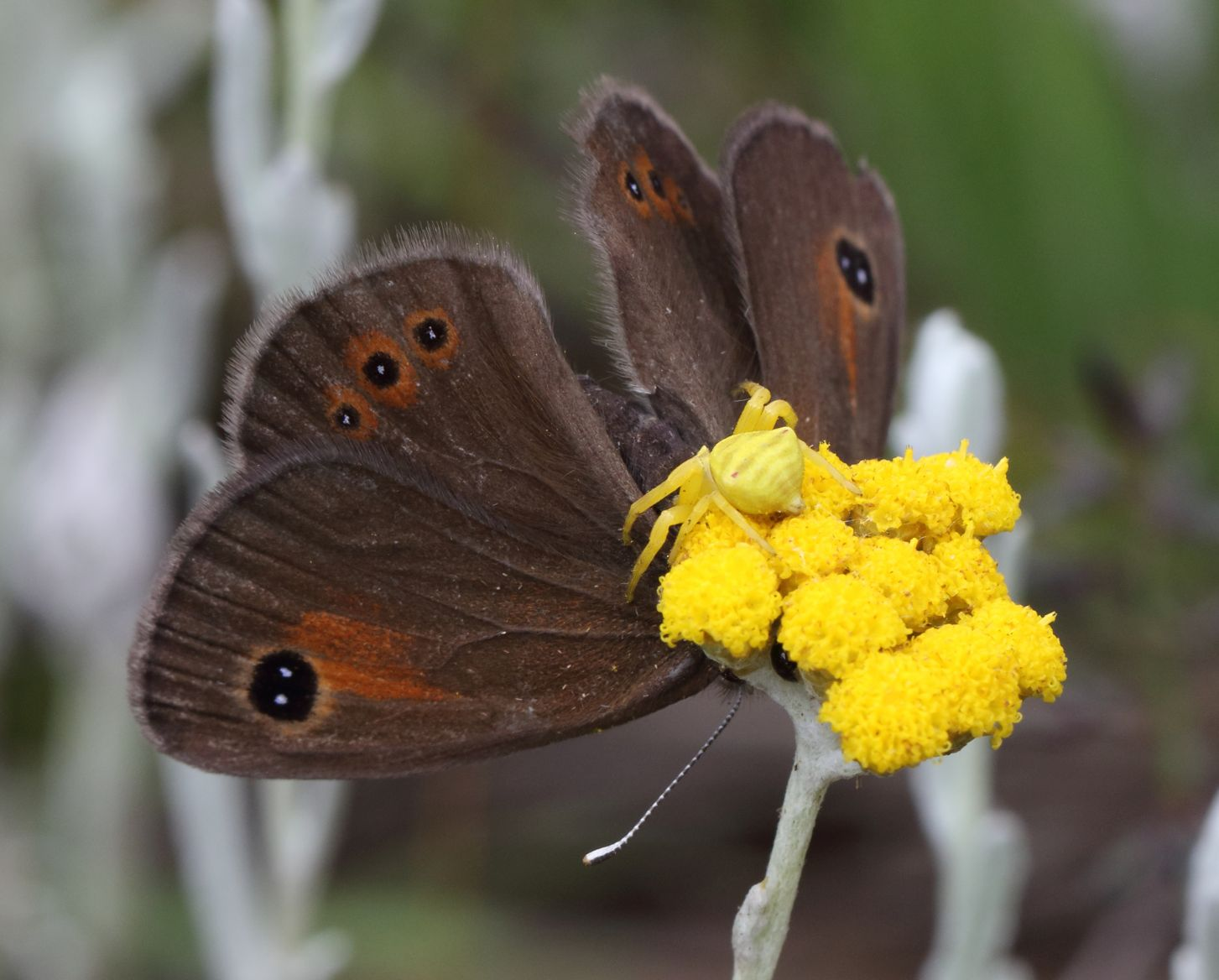
- A paludis brown captured by a flower crab spider

Conservation status
- Least Concern (IUCN 3.1)

Scientific classification
- Kingdom: Animalia
- Phylum: Arthropoda
- Class: Insecta
- Order: Lepidoptera
- Family: Nymphalidae
- Genus: Pseudonympha
- Species: P. paludis

Binomial name
- Pseudonympha paludis Riley, 1938

Synonyms
- Pseudonympha magus f. paludis Riley, 1938

= Pseudonympha paludis =

Species of butterfly

Pseudonympha paludis, the paludis brown, is a butterfly of the family Nymphalidae. It is found in South Africa, from the Eastern Cape to Lesotho, the eastern part of the Free State, the Drakensberg in KwaZulu-Natal and high altitude mountains in Mpumalanga.

The wingspan is 34–38 mm for males and 32–36 mm for females. Adults are on wing from December to January at high altitudes and from November to April in the hills of the Eastern Cape (with a peak in mid-summer). There is one generation per year.

The larvae probably feed on Poaceae grasses.
