= Pseudonympha gaika =

Conservation status
- Least Concern (IUCN 3.1)

Scientific classification
- Kingdom: Animalia
- Phylum: Arthropoda
- Class: Insecta
- Order: Lepidoptera
- Family: Nymphalidae
- Genus: Pseudonympha
- Species: P. gaika

Binomial name
- Pseudonympha gaika Riley, 1938

Synonyms
- Pseudonympha trimenii gaika Riley, 1938

Species of butterfly

Pseudonympha gaika, the Gaika brown, is a butterfly of the family Nymphalidae. It is found in South Africa in the Eastern Cape, then along the Amathole Mountains, the north-east of the Witteberg and from Lesotho to KwaZulu-Natal near the Drakensberg.

The wingspan is 46–48 mm for males and 48–52 mm for females. Adults are on wing from November to February. There is one generation per year.

The larvae probably feed on Poaceae grasses.
