= Nervia monostichus =

Scientific classification
- Kingdom: Animalia
- Phylum: Arthropoda
- Class: Insecta
- Order: Lepidoptera
- Family: Hesperiidae
- Genus: Nervia
- Species: N. monostichus

Binomial name
- Nervia monostichus Hancock & Gardiner, 1982

Synonyms
- Kedestes monostichus Hancock & Gardiner, 1982

Species of butterfly

Nervia monostichus, the single-stitch ranger or AWOL ranger, is a species of butterfly in the family Hesperiidae. It is found in north-eastern Zimbabwe and Namibia. The habitat consists of grassy highveld.

Adults are on wing from February to April.
