= Nervia michaeli =

Scientific classification
- Kingdom: Animalia
- Phylum: Arthropoda
- Class: Insecta
- Order: Lepidoptera
- Family: Hesperiidae
- Genus: Nervia
- Species: N. michaeli

Binomial name
- Nervia michaeli (Gardiner & Hancock, 1982)

Synonyms
- Kedestes michaeli Gardiner & Hancock, 1982

Species of butterfly

Nervia michaeli, or Michael's ranger, is a species of butterfly in the family Hesperiidae. It is found in Zambia and Zimbabwe. The habitat consists of damp, grassy hollows in montane grassland.

Adults are on wing year round.
