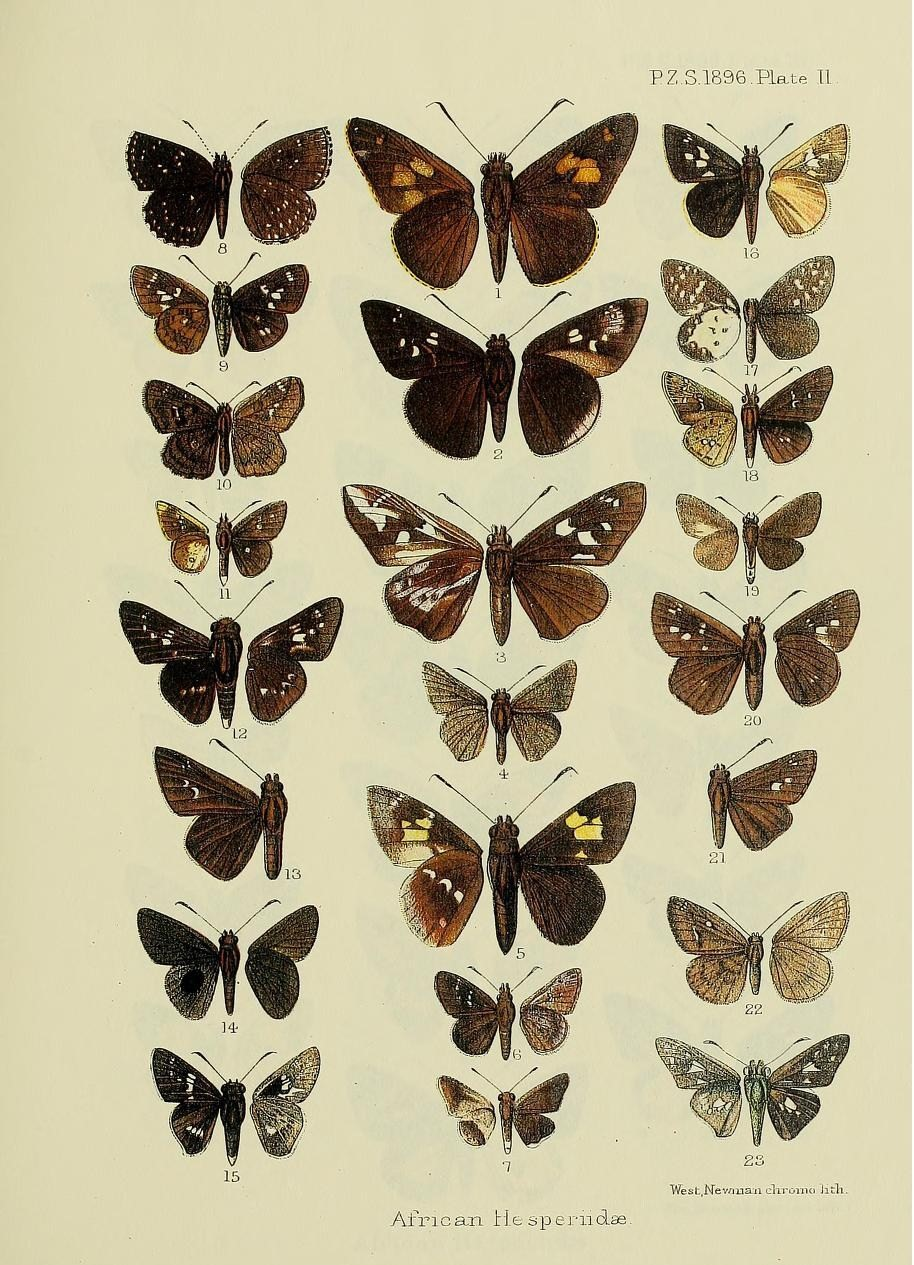
- Figure 16

Conservation status
- Least Concern (IUCN 3.1)

Scientific classification
- Kingdom: Animalia
- Phylum: Arthropoda
- Class: Insecta
- Order: Lepidoptera
- Family: Hesperiidae
- Genus: Nervia
- Species: N. wallengrenii

Binomial name
- Nervia wallengrenii (Trimen, 1883)

Synonyms
- Thymelicus wallengrenii Trimen, 1883; Baracus fenestratus Butler, 1894; Kedestes wallengrenii (Trimen, 1883)

= Nervia wallengrenii =

Species of butterfly

Nervia wallengrenii, also known as Wallengren's ranger or Wallengren's skipper, is a species of butterfly in the family Hesperiidae. It is found in South Africa (KwaZulu-Natal, Transvaal), Zimbabwe and from Mozambique to Kenya. The habitat consists of grassland and woodland.

The wingspan is 27–31 mm for males and 30-35 for females. Adults are on wing from August to November and from February to April. There are two generations per year.

The larvae probably feed on Imperata cylindrica.

== Subspecies ==
- Nervia wallengrenii wallengrenii - Uganda, Kenya, Tanzania, Zambia, Mozambique, Zimbabwe, Eswatini, South Africa: Limpopo Province, Mpumalanga, North West Province, Gauteng, Free State Province, KwaZulu-Natal
- Nervia wallengrenii fenestratus (Butler, 1894) - Tanzania, Malawi
