= Trida sarahae =

Conservation status
- Critically Endangered (IUCN 3.1)

Scientific classification
- Kingdom: Animalia
- Phylum: Arthropoda
- Class: Insecta
- Order: Lepidoptera
- Family: Hesperiidae
- Genus: Trida
- Species: T. sarahae

Binomial name
- Trida sarahae (Henning & Henning, 1998)

Synonyms
- Kedestes sarahae Henning & Henning, 1998

Species of butterfly

Trida sarahae, or Sarah's ranger, is a species of butterfly in the family Hesperiidae. It is only known from the Cederberg mountains in the Western Cape.

The wingspan is 31–34 mm for males and 54–63 mm for females. Adults are on wing in late September.

The larvae probably feed on Merxmuellera species.
