= Nervia pinheyi =

Scientific classification
- Domain: Eukaryota
- Kingdom: Animalia
- Phylum: Arthropoda
- Class: Insecta
- Order: Lepidoptera
- Family: Hesperiidae
- Genus: Nervia
- Species: N. pinheyi

Binomial name
- Nervia pinheyi Hancock & Gardiner, 1982

Synonyms
- Kedestes pinheyi Hancock & Gardiner, 1982

Species of butterfly

Nervia pinheyi is a species of butterfly in the family Hesperiidae. It is found in north-western Zambia.
