= Pseudonympha penningtoni =

Conservation status
- Least Concern (IUCN 3.1)

Scientific classification
- Kingdom: Animalia
- Phylum: Arthropoda
- Class: Insecta
- Order: Lepidoptera
- Family: Nymphalidae
- Genus: Pseudonympha
- Species: P. penningtoni

Binomial name
- Pseudonympha penningtoni Riley, 1938

Species of butterfly

Pseudonympha penningtoni, or Pennington's brown, is a butterfly of the family Nymphalidae. It is found in South Africa, mainly in Lesotho at altitudes ranging from about 2,700 meters to the highest summits. It is also found in the Eastern Cape and the summits of the Drakensberg in KwaZulu-Natal.

The wingspan is 30–32 mm for males and 29–31 mm for females. Adults are on wing from December to February. There is one generation per year.

The larvae probably feed on Poaceae grasses.
