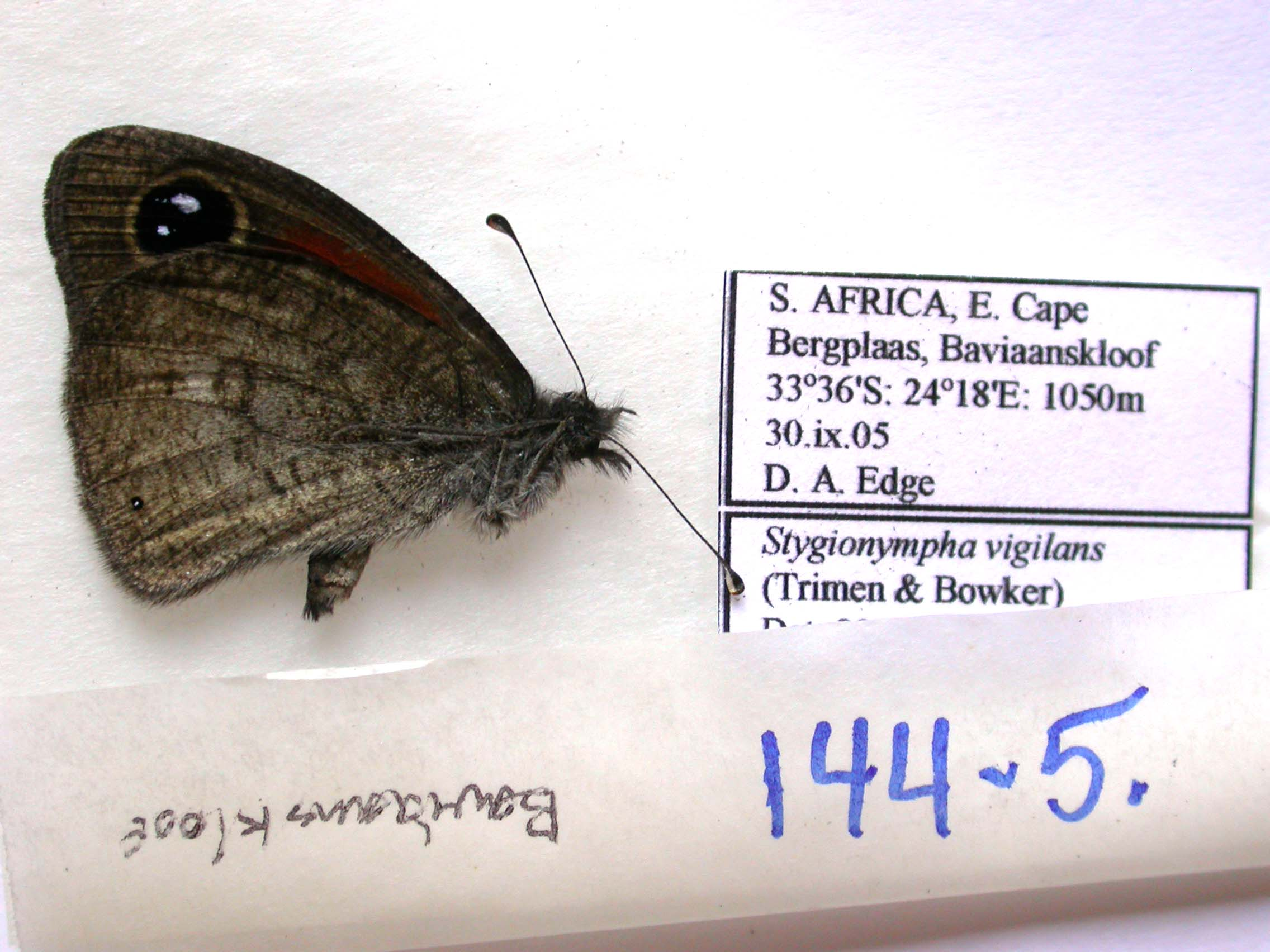

Scientific classification
- Domain: Eukaryota
- Kingdom: Animalia
- Phylum: Arthropoda
- Class: Insecta
- Order: Lepidoptera
- Family: Nymphalidae
- Genus: Stygionympha
- Species: S. vigilans

Binomial name
- Stygionympha vigilans (Trimen, 1887)

Synonyms
- Pseudonympha vigilans Trimen, 1887

= Stygionympha vigilans =

Species of butterfly

Stygionympha vigilans, the western hillside brown, is a butterfly of the family Nymphalidae. It is found in South Africa on the seaward side of the mountains from Cederberg south to the Cape Peninsula in the Western Cape and along the Drakensberg mountains to Grahamstown in the Eastern Cape.

The wingspan is 45–48 mm. Adults are on wing from October to December and from August to April (with peaks from October to November and February). There are probably multiple generations per year.

The larvae feed on Poaceae grasses. Larvae have also been reared on Ehrharta erecta and Ischyrolepsis cinncinnata.
