= Stygionympha scotina =

Scientific classification
- Domain: Eukaryota
- Kingdom: Animalia
- Phylum: Arthropoda
- Class: Insecta
- Order: Lepidoptera
- Family: Nymphalidae
- Subfamily: Satyrinae
- Tribe: Satyrini
- Genus: Stygionympha
- Species: S. scotina

Binomial name
- Stygionympha scotina Quickelberge, 1977

Species of butterfly

Stygionympha scotina, the eastern hillside brown, is a butterfly of the family Nymphalidae. It is found in South Africa on the seaward side of the mountains from Cederberg south to the Cape Peninsula in Western Cape and along the Drakensberg mountains to Grahamstown in Eastern Cape.

The wingspan is 45–48 mm. Adults are on wing from September to March. There are probably multiple generations per year.

The larvae probably feed on Poaceae grasses.

== Subspecies ==
- Stygionympha scotina scotina (Winterberge to the Drakensberg and Malutis. Also Witkoppe)
- Stygionympha scotina coetzeri Henning & Henning, 1994 (along the Drakensberg in the Mpumalanga and Limpopo provinces)
