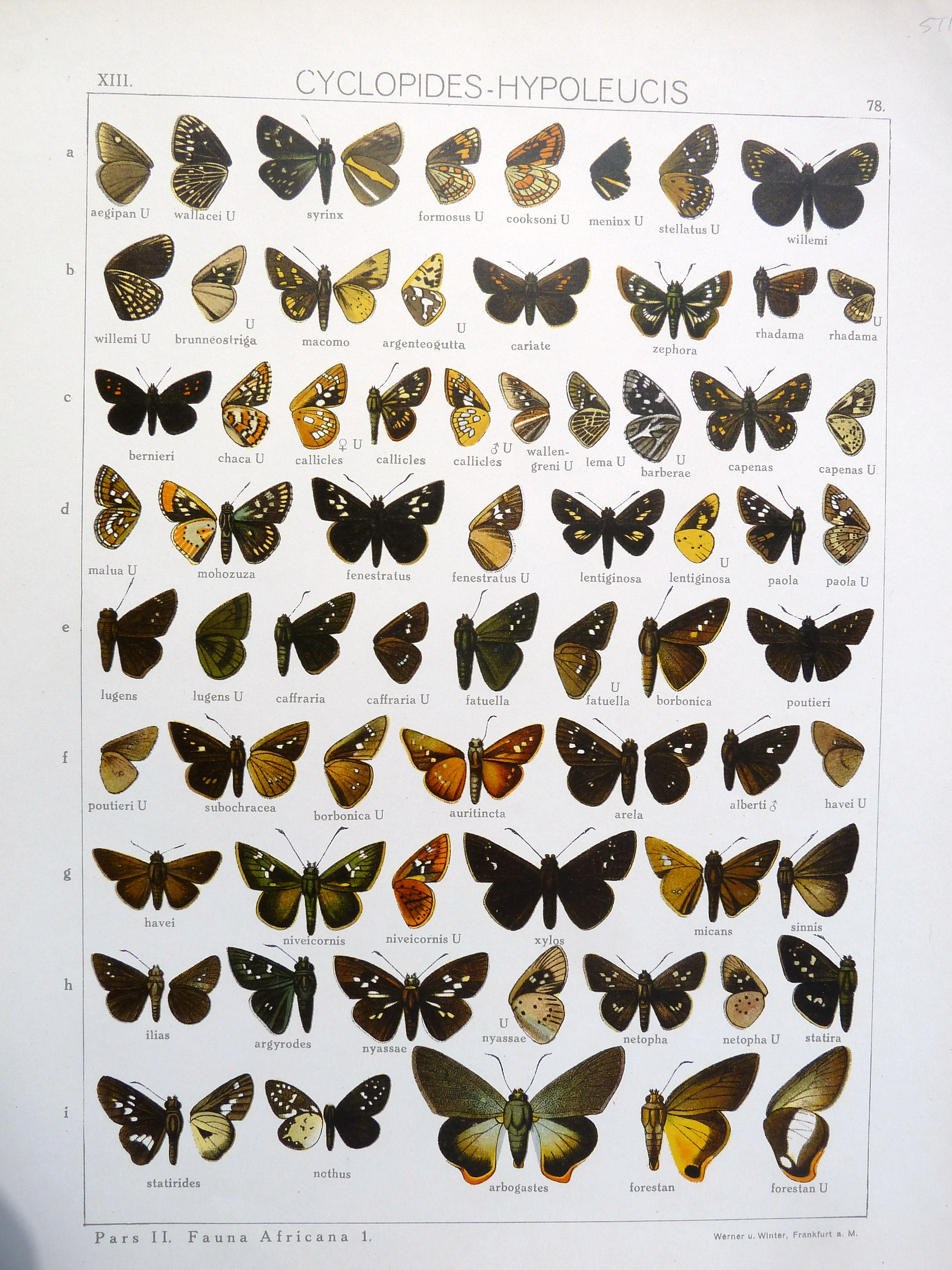

Conservation status
- Least Concern (IUCN 3.1)

Scientific classification
- Kingdom: Animalia
- Phylum: Arthropoda
- Class: Insecta
- Order: Lepidoptera
- Family: Hesperiidae
- Genus: Nervia
- Species: N. chaca

Binomial name
- Nervia chaca (Trimen, 1873)

Synonyms
- Pyrgus chaca Trimen, 1873; Kedestes chaca (Trimen, 1873)

= Nervia chaca =

Species of butterfly

Nervia chaca, commonly known as Shaka's ranger or Shaka's skipper, is a species of butterfly in the family Hesperiidae. It is found in South Africa, from the southern and eastern slopes of the Drakensberg foothills in the eastern Cape through the Kokstad area into KwaZulu-Natal.

The wingspan is 36–38 mm for males and 38–44 mm for females. Adults are on wing from October to April (with a peak from December to January). There is one generation per year.
