= Pseudonympha machacha =

Conservation status
- Least Concern (IUCN 3.1)

Scientific classification
- Kingdom: Animalia
- Phylum: Arthropoda
- Class: Insecta
- Order: Lepidoptera
- Family: Nymphalidae
- Genus: Pseudonympha
- Species: P. machacha

Binomial name
- Pseudonympha machacha Riley, 1938

Species of butterfly

Pseudonympha machacha, the Machacha brown, is a butterfly of the family Nymphalidae. It is found in South Africa, mainly in Lesotho, but also in the Eastern Cape and KwaZulu-Natal.

The wingspan is 34–35 mm for males and 32–34 mm for females. Adults are on wing from December to February. There is one generation per year.

The larvae probably feed on Poaceae grasses.
