= Pseudonympha varii =

Conservation status
- Least Concern (IUCN 3.1)

Scientific classification
- Kingdom: Animalia
- Phylum: Arthropoda
- Class: Insecta
- Order: Lepidoptera
- Family: Nymphalidae
- Genus: Pseudonympha
- Species: P. varii

Binomial name
- Pseudonympha varii van Son, 1955

Synonyms
- Pseudonympha varii f. caeca Woodhall, 2000

Species of butterfly

Pseudonympha varii, or Vari's brown, is a butterfly of the family Nymphalidae. It is found in South Africa, from the Eastern Cape, Malutis and the Drakensberg to the KwaZulu-Natal midlands.

The wingspan is 46–50 mm for males and 44–48 mm for females. Adults are on wing from November to December and from January to March. There are two generations per year in most of the range, but there is a single generation with adults on wing from December to January at high altitudes.

The larvae probably feed on Poaceae grasses or Cyperaceae sedges.
