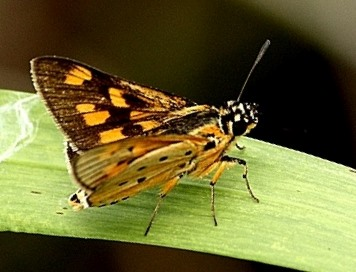

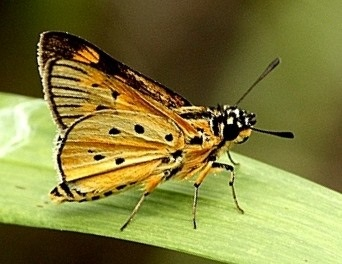

Scientific classification
- Domain: Eukaryota
- Kingdom: Animalia
- Phylum: Arthropoda
- Class: Insecta
- Order: Lepidoptera
- Family: Hesperiidae
- Genus: Kedestes
- Species: K. marshalli

Binomial name
- Kedestes marshalli Aurivillius, 1925

Synonyms
- Kedestes macomo f. marshalli Aurivillius, 1925

= Kedestes marshalli =

Marshall's ranger

Species of butterfly

Kedestes marshalli, Marshall's ranger, is a butterfly in the family Hesperiidae. It is found in Zimbabwe.

Adults are on wing all year, except in the winter months.
