= Farhult Church =

- Farhults kyrka
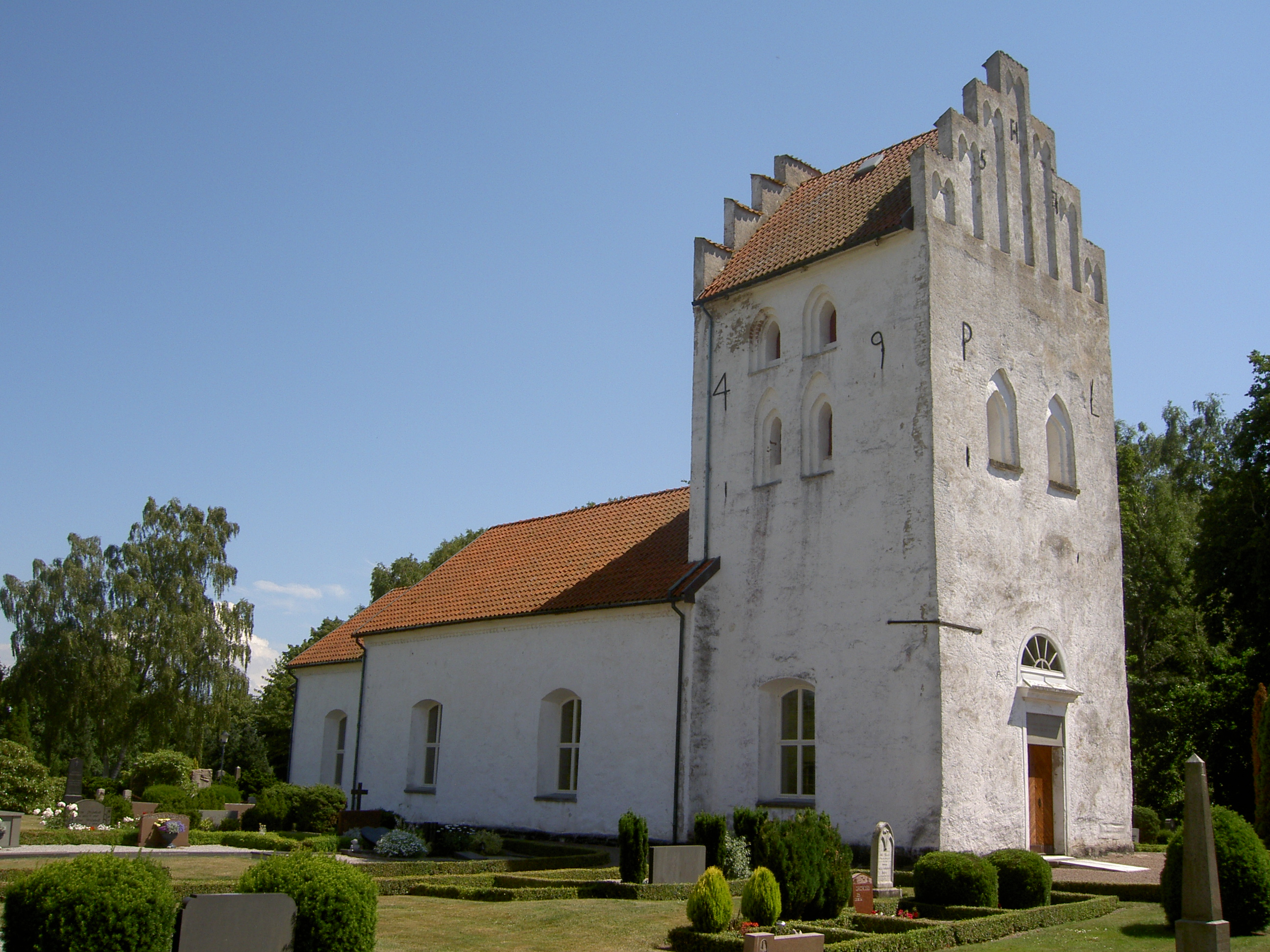
- Farhult Church

- 56°12′50″N 12°42′43″E
- Country: Sweden
- Denomination: Church of Sweden

Administration
- Diocese: Lund

Farhult Church (Swedish: Farhults kyrka) is a medieval church south-west of Ängelholm, Sweden. It belongs to the Diocese of Lund.

== History and architecture ==
The oldest parts of Farhult Church are the nave, choir and apse, dating from circa 1200 and Romanesque in style. The western tower was added during the 15th century. During the 15th century a church porch was also added to the church, but this was torn down during a renovation of the church in 1838.

The construction material of the church is whitewashed fieldstone, while the corners and other details are made of sandstone. The windows date from the 1870s, when the considerably smaller, medieval windows were replaced. Internally, the ceiling is supported by medieval vaulting which has been heavily restored during the 19th century. In the apse, behind the altar, murals from the 14th century were uncovered during a renovation in 1953. During the same renovation, the church also received new pews, flooring and a new altar. The altarpiece however is from the 18th century. Of even earlier date is the pulpit, dated 1626 and similar to others in churches in the vicinity of Helsingborg. The organ is from 1916. The church bell is from 1636 and was made in Helsingborg.
