= Lepidochrysops loewensteini =

Conservation status
- Least Concern (IUCN 3.1)

Scientific classification
- Kingdom: Animalia
- Phylum: Arthropoda
- Class: Insecta
- Order: Lepidoptera
- Family: Lycaenidae
- Genus: Lepidochrysops
- Species: L. loewensteini

Binomial name
- Lepidochrysops loewensteini (Swanepoel, 1951)

Synonyms
- Cupido loewensteini Swanepoel, 1951

Species of butterfly

Lepidochrysops loewensteini, the Loewenstein's blue, is a species of butterfly in the family Lycaenidae. It is endemic to South Africa and Lesotho. It is mainly found in Lesotho and on the high slopes above Dulcie's Nek in the Eastern Cape.

The wingspan is 32–35 mm for males and 32–33 mm for females. Adults are on wing from January to February. Their life cycle produces one generation per year.
