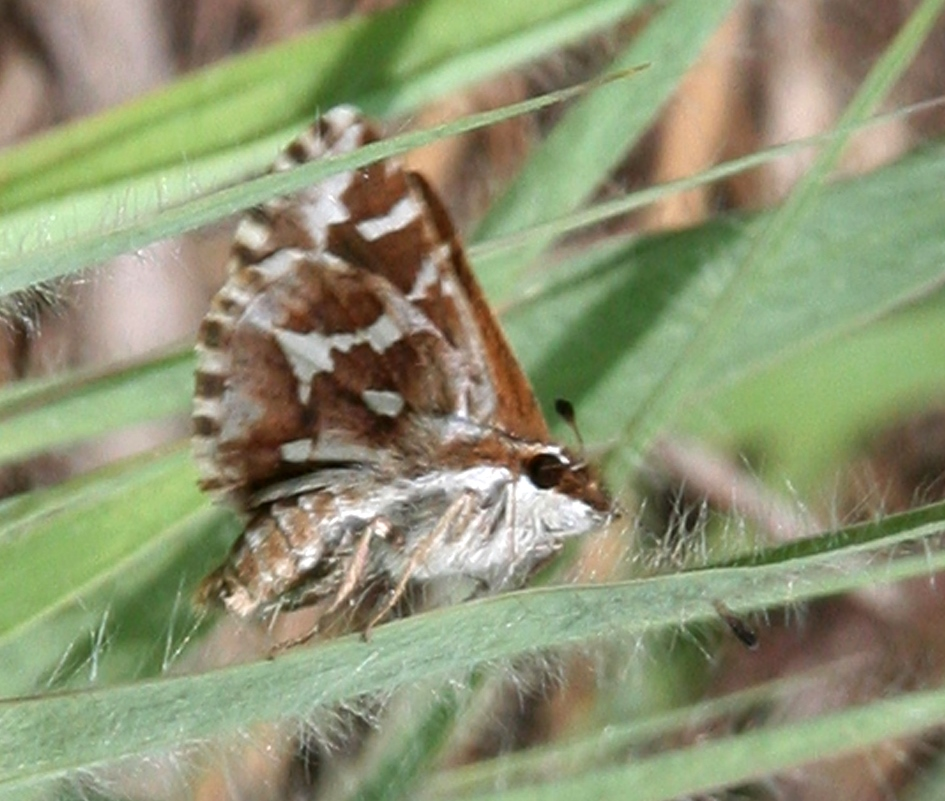

Conservation status
- Least Concern (IUCN 3.1)

Scientific classification
- Kingdom: Animalia
- Phylum: Arthropoda
- Class: Insecta
- Order: Lepidoptera
- Family: Hesperiidae
- Genus: Trida
- Species: T. barberae

Binomial name
- Trida barberae (Trimen, 1873)

Synonyms
- Cyclopides barberae Trimen, 1873; Thymelicus barberae (Trimen, 1873); Kedestes barberae (Trimen, 1873)

= Trida barberae =

Barber's ranger

Species of butterfly

Trida barberae, or Barber's ranger, is a species of butterfly in the family Hesperiidae. It is found in southern Africa, from the Cape Province to Zimbabwe, Lesotho, Transvaal, the Free State and KwaZulu-Natal.

The wingspan is 26–33 mm for males and 29–38 mm for females. The subspecies T. b. bunta has only one generation per year, with adults on wing in September. The other two subspecies are on wing from October to November and from February to April in two generations.

The larvae feed on Imperata cylindrica.

== Subspecies ==
- Trida barberae barberae — south-western Tanzania, Zambia, eastern Zimbabwe, Eswatini, Lesotho, South Africa: Limpopo Province, Mpumalanga, North West Province, Gauteng, Free State Province, KwaZulu-Natal, Eastern Cape Province
- Trida barberae bonsa Evans, 1956 — dry grassland of north-western East Cape and south-eastern North Cape
- Trida barberae bunta Evans, 1956 — in fynbos on coastal dunes on the Cape Peninsula and the Cape Flats as well as the West Cape
