= Hans Daniel Johan Wallengren =

Swedish clergyman and entomologist

Hans Daniel Johan Wallengren (8 June 1823 – 25 October 1894) was a Swedish clergyman and entomologist.

== Biography ==
He was born in Lund, Sweden. Wallengren became a student at Lund University from 1842, was ordained a priest in 1847 and was appointed parish priest at Farhult and Jonstorp parishes. He undertook zoological studies with trips to Gotland and to Bohemia and Silesia, He also visited the museums in Braunschweig, Berlin and Copenhagen. Wallengren was responsible for studying and naming the butterflies collected by naturalist and explorer Johan August Wahlberg (1810–1856) at Kafferland (now Cape Province in South Africa).

== Selected works ==
- Lepidoptera Scandinavioæ Rhopalocera (1853)
- Skandinaviens Heterocerfjärilar: I. Closterocera (1863), II. Spinnarna (1869–85)
- Coleophorer (1859)
- Fjädermott (1860)
- Lepidoptera nova (1861 i "Fregatten Eugenies resa omkring jorden 1851–53")
- Lepidoptera rhopalocera in terra Caffrorum collecta (1857)
- Heterocerfjärilar, samlade i kafferlandet af J.A. Wahlberg, Index specierum, Noctuarum et Geometrarum in Scandinavia hucusque detectarum (1874)
- Species Tortricum et Tinearum Scandinaviæ (1875)
