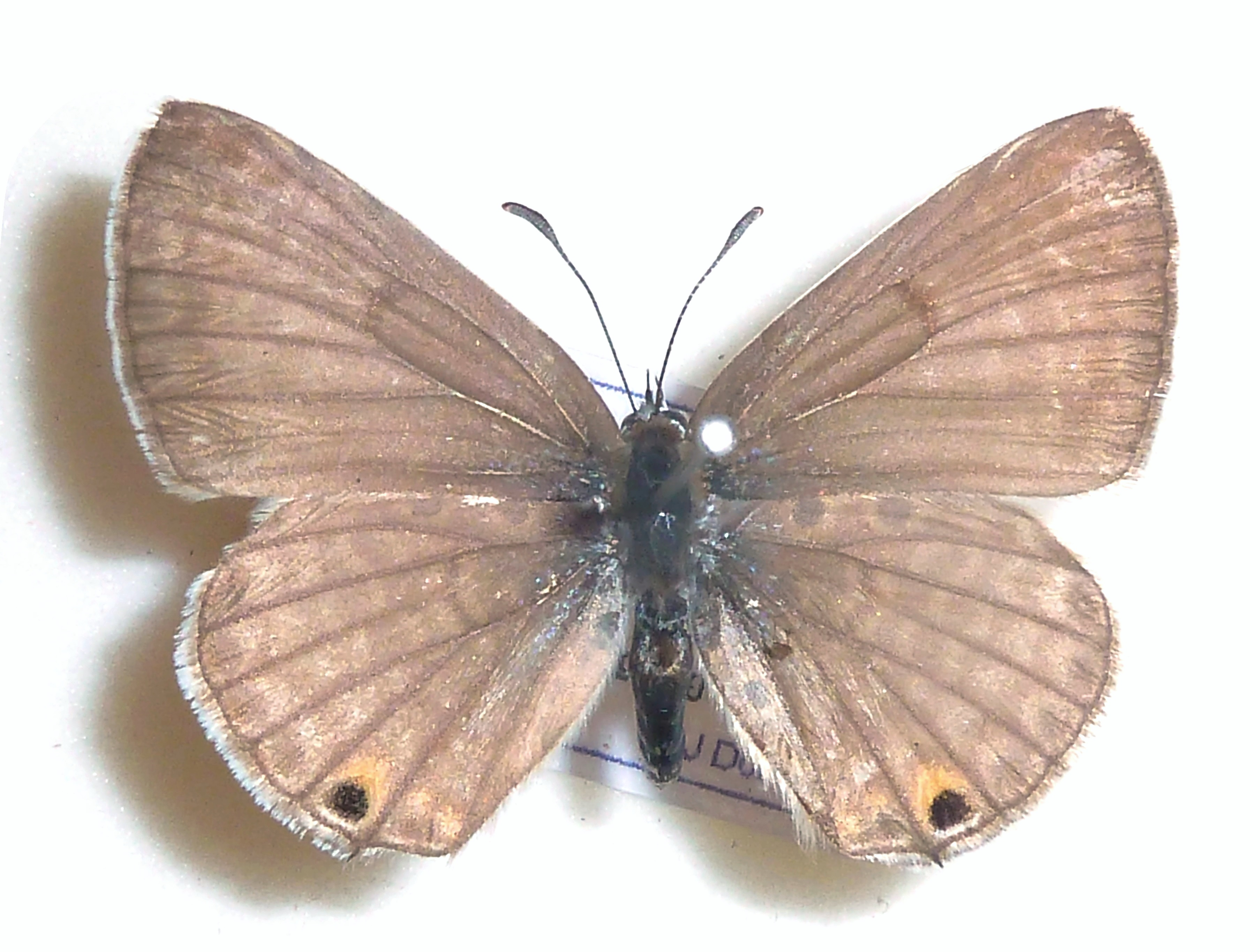

Scientific classification
- Kingdom: Animalia
- Phylum: Arthropoda
- Class: Insecta
- Order: Lepidoptera
- Family: Lycaenidae
- Genus: Lepidochrysops
- Species: L. plebeja

Binomial name
- Lepidochrysops plebeja (Butler, 1898)

Synonyms
- Catachrysops plebeja Butler, 1898; Neochrysops plebeia; Neochrysops proclus Hulstaert, 1924

= Lepidochrysops plebeja =

Twin-spot blue

Species of butterfly

Lepidochrysops plebeja, the twin-spot blue, is a butterfly of the family Lycaenidae. It was described by Arthur Gardiner Butler in 1898. It is found in Botswana, Zimbabwe, Mozambique, Malawi, Zambia and South Africa.

The wingspan is 35–43 millimetres (1.4–1.7 in) for males and 38–45 mm for females. Adults are on wing from November to January. There is one generation per year.

The larvae feed on Lantana rugosa. Third and later instar larvae feed on the brood of Camponotus niveosetus ants.

== Subspecies ==
- Lepidochrysops plebeja plebeja (northern Eastern Cape, KwaZulu-Natal, north-western Free State, Gauteng, Mpumalanga, Limpopo, North West and Northern Cape)
- Lepidochrysops plebeja proclus (Hulstaert, 1924)
