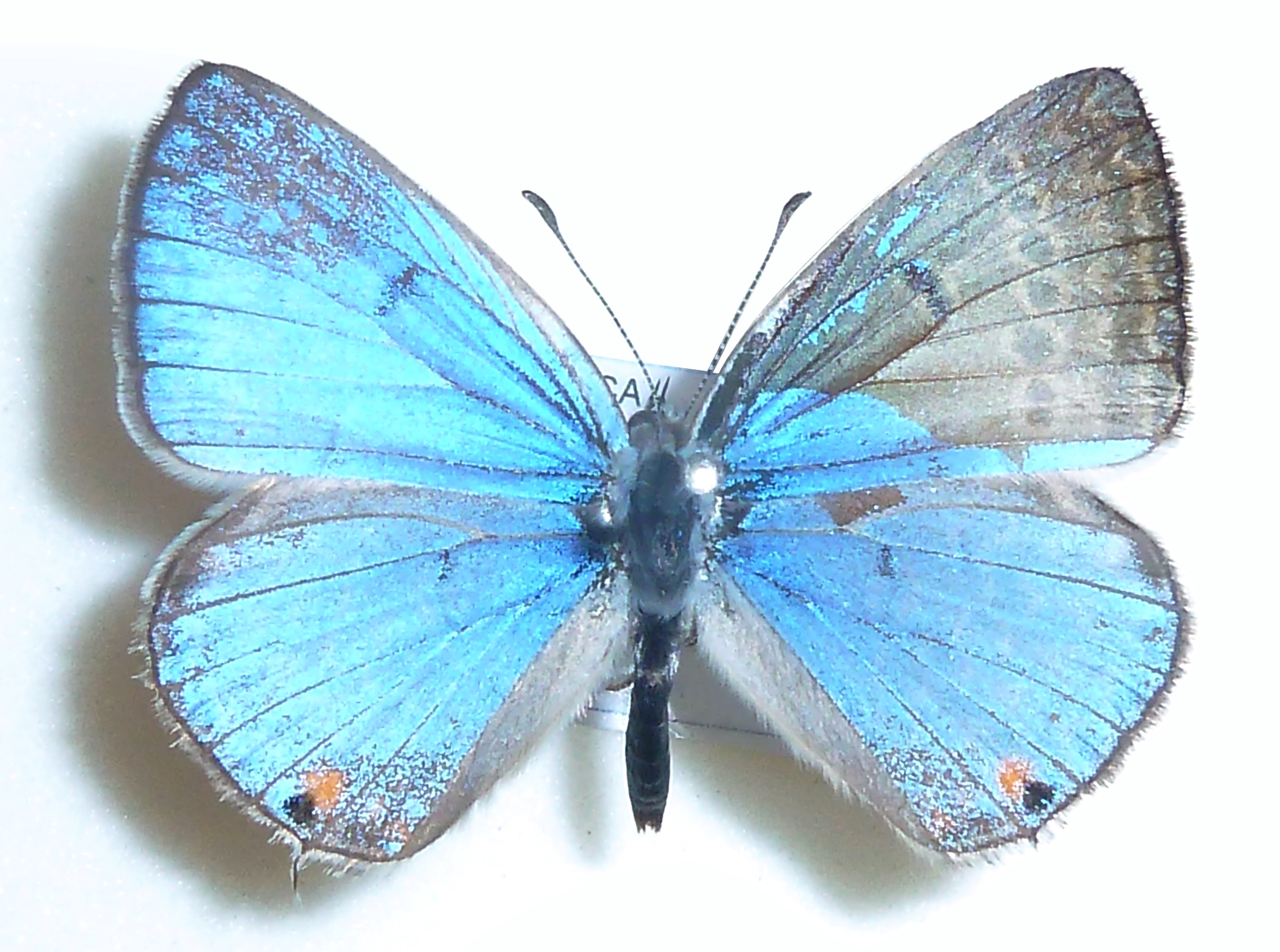
- Lepidochrysops glauca, male

Scientific classification
- Kingdom: Animalia
- Phylum: Arthropoda
- Clade: Pancrustacea
- Class: Insecta
- Order: Lepidoptera
- Family: Lycaenidae
- Genus: Lepidochrysops
- Species: L. glauca

Binomial name
- Lepidochrysops glauca (Trimen, 1887)

Synonyms
- Lycaena glauca Trimen, 1887; Cupido glauca; Catochrysops glauca; Neochrysops glauca; Lepidochrysops glauca var. swinburnei Stevenson, 1939

= Lepidochrysops glauca =

Silvery blue

Species of butterfly

Lepidochrysops glauca, the silvery blue or African silvery blue, is a butterfly of the family Lycaenidae. It is found from the African tropics to South Africa. It should not be confused with Glaucopsyche lygdamus which is also sometimes called "silvery blue".

The wingspan is 35–40 mm for males and 38–48 mm for females. Adults are on the wing from September to December and from January to April. There are two generations per year.

The larvae feed on Ocimum canum and Lantana rugosa.

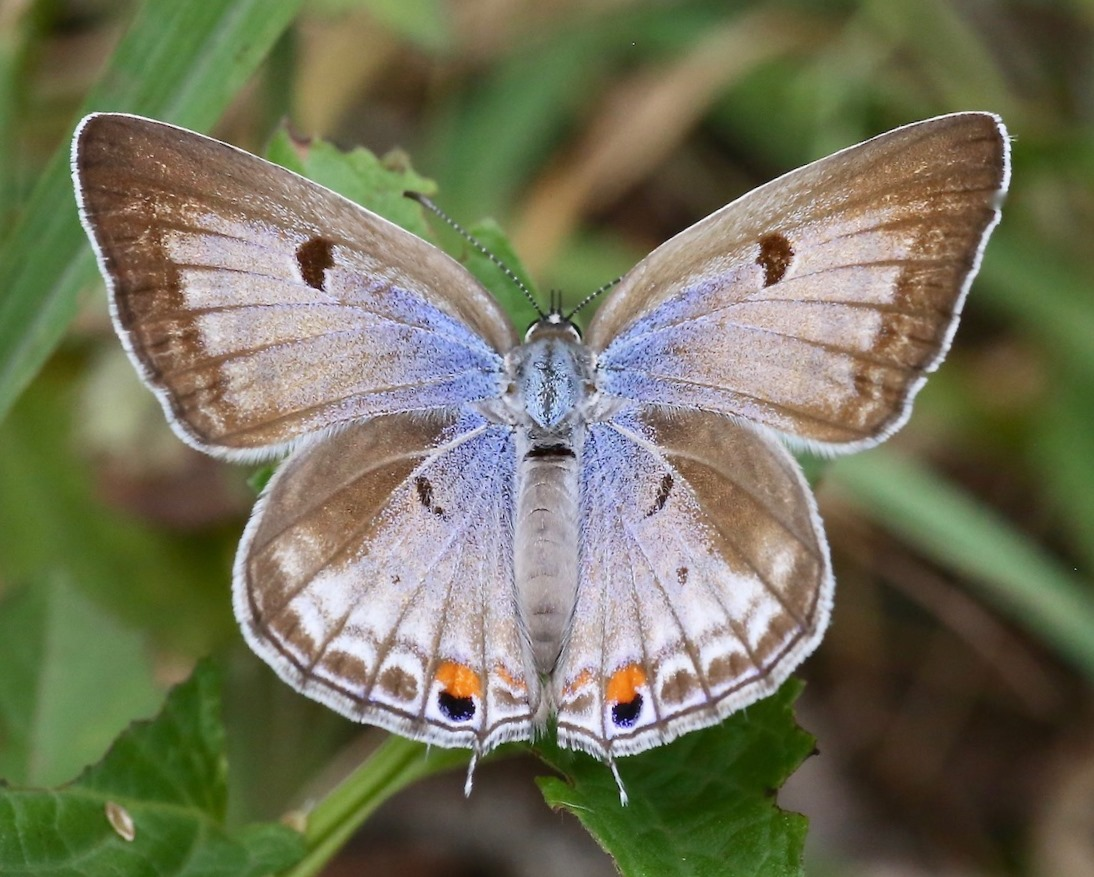
Lepidochrysops glauca glauca, female, upper side

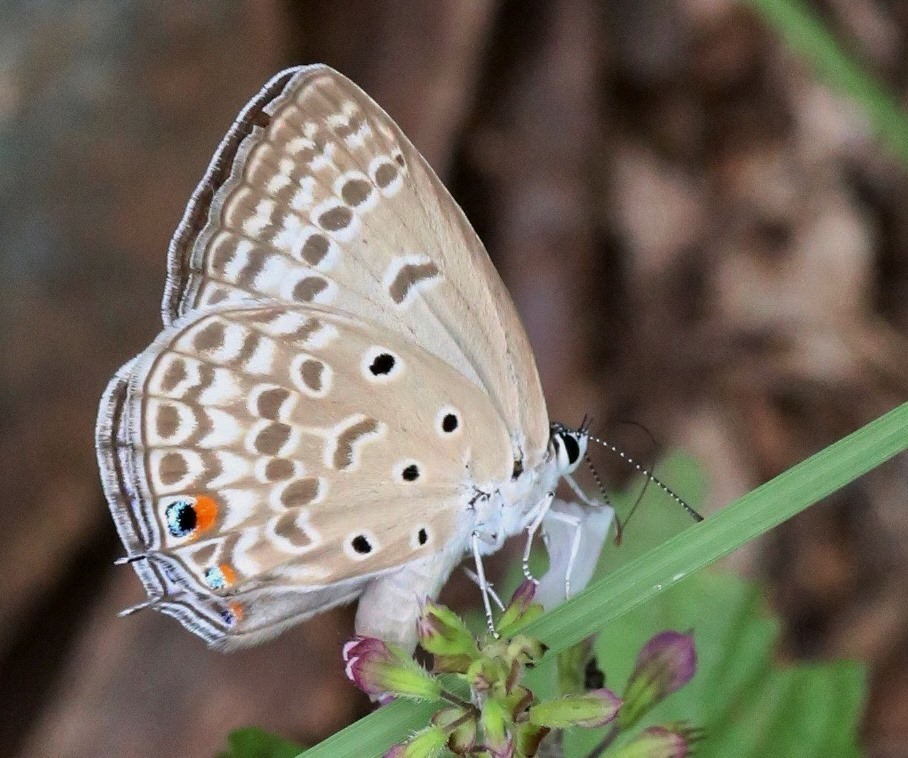
Lepidochrysops glauca glauca, female, underside

== Subspecies ==
- Lepidochrysops glauca glauca

Range: Gabon, DRC, Angola, Tanzania, Malawi, Zambia, Zimbabwe, Botswana, Eswatini, South Africa: Limpopo, Mpumalanga, North West, Gauteng, Free State and KwaZulu-Natal provinces

- Lepidochrysops glauca swinburnei Stevenson, 1939

Range: Zimbabwe
