= Lantana pastazensis =

Conservation status
- Vulnerable (IUCN 3.1)

Scientific classification
- Kingdom: Plantae
- Clade: Tracheophytes
- Clade: Angiosperms
- Clade: Eudicots
- Clade: Asterids
- Order: Lamiales
- Family: Verbenaceae
- Genus: Lantana
- Species: L. pastazensis

Binomial name
- Lantana pastazensis Moldenke

Species of flowering plant

Lantana pastazensis is a species of flowering plant in the verbena family, Verbenaceae, that is endemic to Ecuador. Its natural habitat is lowland tropical moist forests. It is mildly toxic due to the presence of pentacyclic terpenoids.

== Etymology ==
The name Lantana derives from the Latin name of the wayfaring tree Viburnum lantana, the flowers of which closely resemble Lantana.
