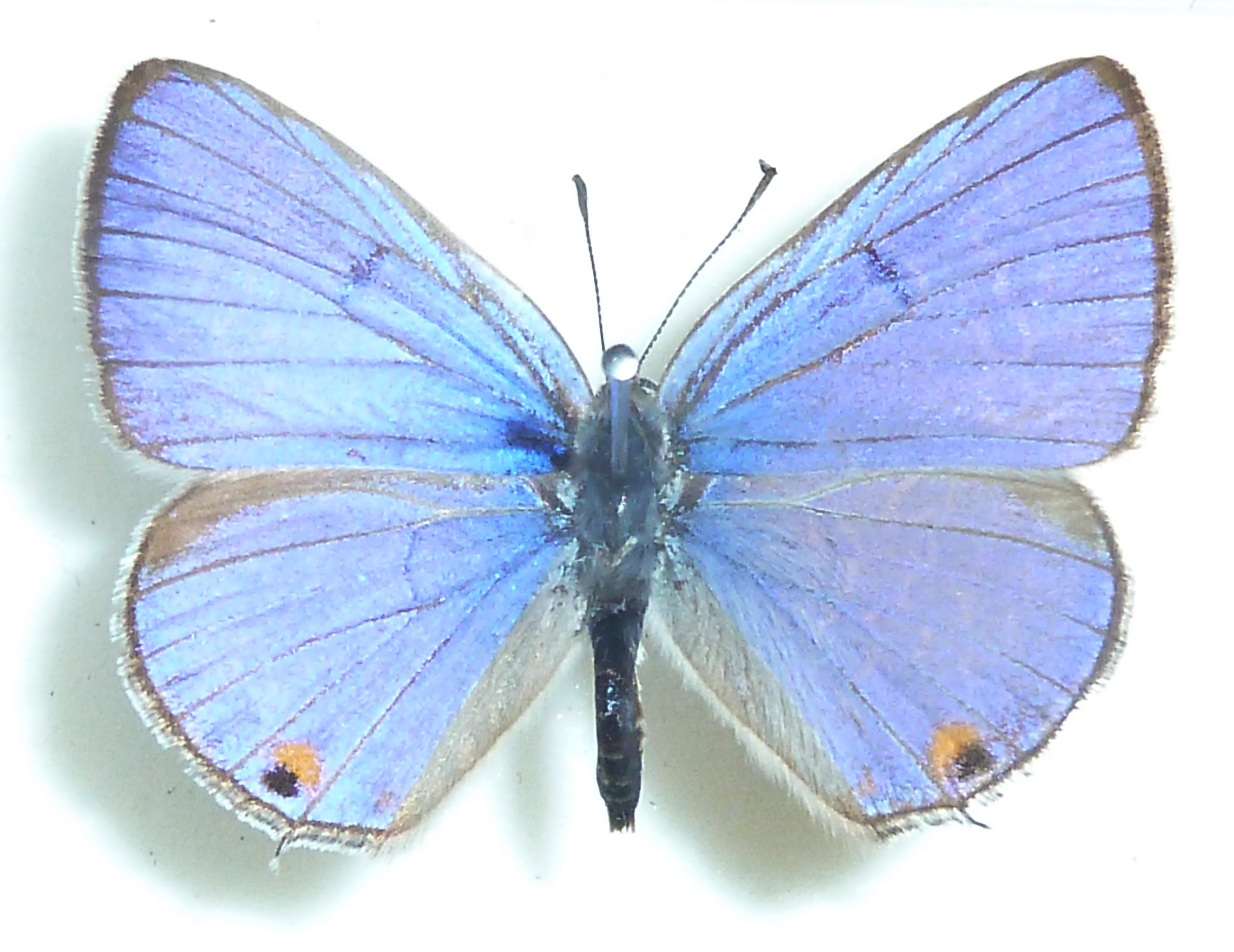

Scientific classification
- Kingdom: Animalia
- Phylum: Arthropoda
- Class: Insecta
- Order: Lepidoptera
- Family: Lycaenidae
- Genus: Lepidochrysops
- Species: L. patricia

Binomial name
- Lepidochrysops patricia (Trimen, 1887)

Synonyms
- Lycaena patricia Trimen, 1887; Lepidochrysops patricia f. radiata Woodhall, 2000

= Lepidochrysops patricia =

Patrician blue

Species of butterfly

Lepidochrysops patricia, the patrician blue, is a butterfly of the family Lycaenidae. It is found in South Africa, from the Western Cape to the Eastern Cape and to KwaZulu-Natal, the Free State, Gauteng, Mpumalanga, Limpopo, the North West and the Northern Cape.

The wingspan is 35–44 mm for males and 36–46 mm for females. Adults are on wing from September to December and from January to April. There are two generations per year.

The larvae feed on Salvia species, Lantana rugosa and Lantana camara. Third and later instar larvae feed on the brood of Camponotus maculatus ants.
