= Paradichelia coenographa =

Scientific classification
- Domain: Eukaryota
- Kingdom: Animalia
- Phylum: Arthropoda
- Class: Insecta
- Order: Lepidoptera
- Family: Tortricidae
- Genus: Paradichelia
- Species: P. coenographa

Binomial name
- Paradichelia coenographa (Meyrick, 1938)

Synonyms
- Tortrix coenographa Meyrick, 1938

Species of moth

Paradichelia coenographa is a species of moth of the family Tortricidae. It is found in Papua New Guinea.

The larvae feed on Camellia sinensis, Colocasia esculenta, Coffea and Lantana species.
