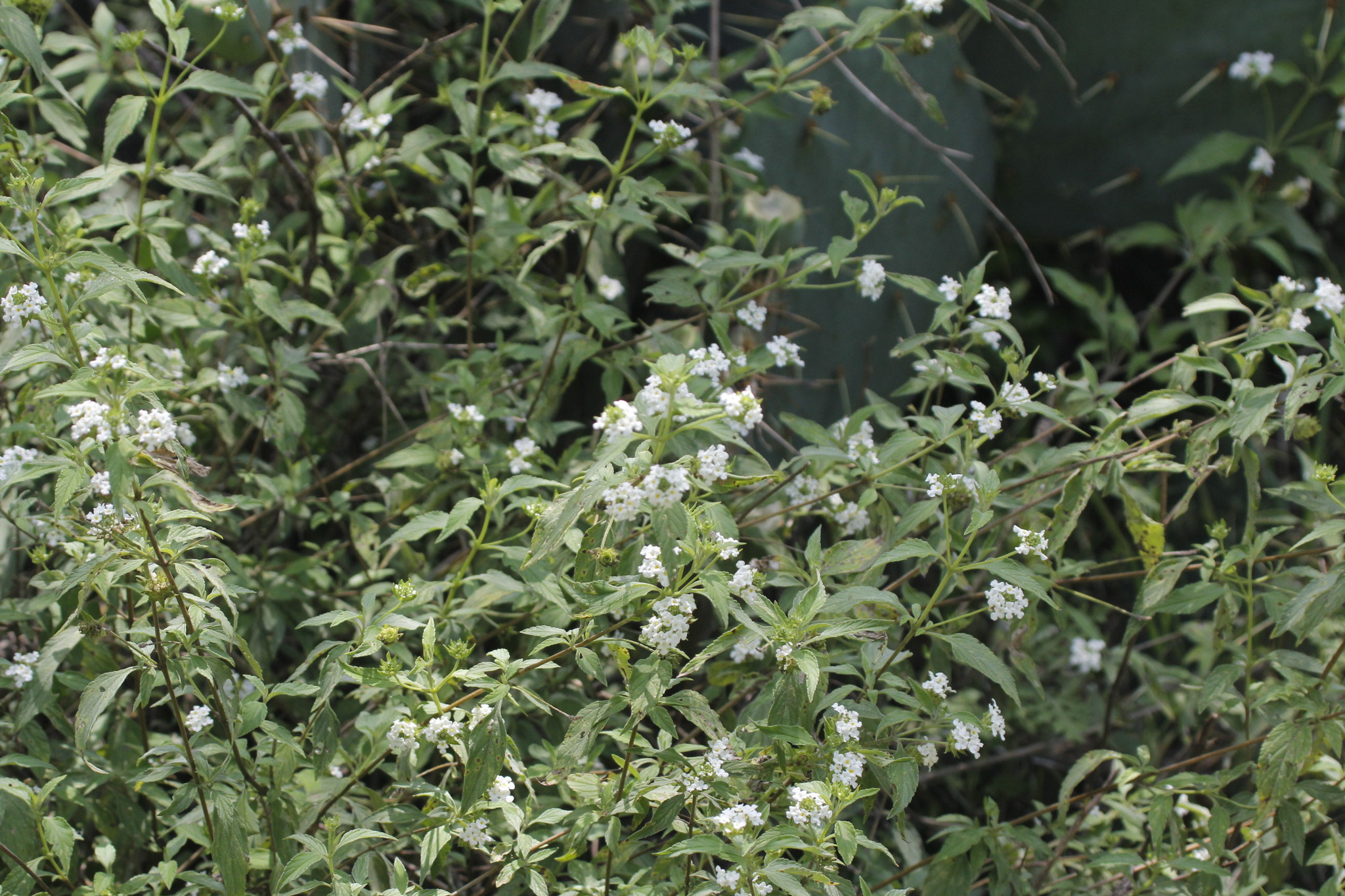

Scientific classification
- Kingdom: Plantae
- Clade: Tracheophytes
- Clade: Angiosperms
- Clade: Eudicots
- Clade: Asterids
- Order: Lamiales
- Family: Verbenaceae
- Genus: Lantana
- Species: L. achyranthifolia

Binomial name
- Lantana achyranthifolia Desf.

= Lantana achyranthifolia =

Species of shrub

Lantana achyranthifolia, the brushland shrubverbena, is a perennial woody shrub, and a member of the verbena family, Verbenaceae.

== Etymology ==
The name Lantana derives from the Latin name of the wayfaring tree Viburnum lantana, the flowers of which closely resemble Lantana.
