= Pseudopyrausta acutangulalis =

Scientific classification
- Kingdom: Animalia
- Phylum: Arthropoda
- Class: Insecta
- Order: Lepidoptera
- Family: Crambidae
- Genus: Pseudopyrausta
- Species: P. acutangulalis

Binomial name
- Pseudopyrausta acutangulalis (Snellen, 1875)

Synonyms
- Botys acutangulalis Snellen, 1875

Species of moth

Pseudopyrausta acutangulalis is a moth of the family Crambidae described by Pieter Cornelius Tobias Snellen in 1875. It is native to South America, Central America and the Antilles. It has been introduced to Hawaii to control species of the genus Lantana.

The larvae feed on Lantana camara.
