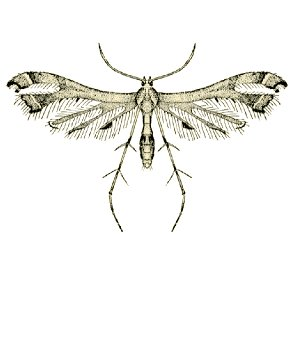

Scientific classification
- Kingdom: Animalia
- Phylum: Arthropoda
- Clade: Pancrustacea
- Class: Insecta
- Order: Lepidoptera
- Family: Pterophoridae
- Genus: Lantanophaga
- Species: L. pusillidactyla

Binomial name
- Lantanophaga pusillidactyla (Walker, 1864)

Synonyms
- Oxyptilus pusillidactyla Walker, 1864; Platyptilia pusillidactyla; Lantanophaga pusillidactylus; Platyptilia technidion Zeller, 1877; Platyptilia hemimetra Meyrick, 1886; Platyptilia lantana Busck, 1914; Platyptilia lantanadactyla Amsel, 1951; Platyptilia teleacma Meyrick, 1932; Platyptilia amphiloga Meyrick, 1909

= Lantanophaga pusillidactyla =

Lantana plume moth

Species of plume moth

Lantanophaga pusillidactyla, the lantana plume moth, is a moth of the family Pterophoridae. It is native to the southern United States, Mexico, the Caribbean, and South America.

Other records include Cape Verde, Republic of the Congo, Democratic Republic of the Congo, Ivory Coast, Réunion, South Africa, Madagascar, Mauritius, Nigeria, Seychelles, Eswatini, Tanzania, Zambia, Israel, Morocco, India, Indonesia (Java), New Guinea and Sri Lanka.

The wingspan is 11–14 mm.

Adults feed on flowers and lay eggs in flower heads. The larvae feed on Lantana camara, Lantana montevidensis, Lantana hispida, Lantana peduncularis, Lantana indica, Lantana involucrata, Lippia alba, Phyla nodiflora, Phyla lanceolata, Caperonia palustris, Mentha and Utricularia species.
