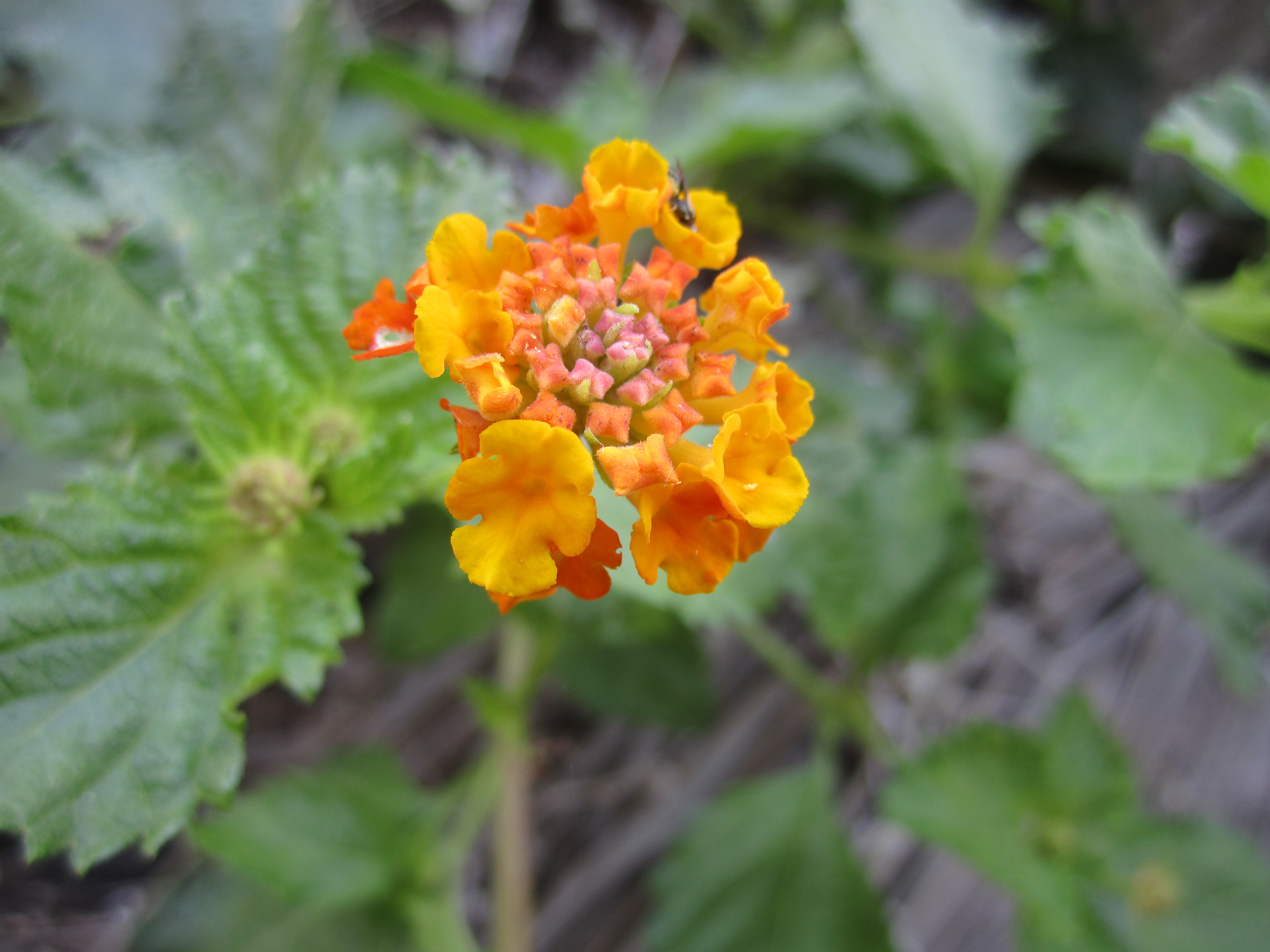
- Cluster of Lantana Horrida flowers

Scientific classification
- Kingdom: Plantae
- Clade: Tracheophytes
- Clade: Angiosperms
- Clade: Eudicots
- Clade: Asterids
- Order: Lamiales
- Family: Verbenaceae
- Genus: Lantana
- Species: L. horrida

Binomial name
- Lantana horrida Kunth

Synonyms
- Lantana antillana Raf.; Lantana arida Britton; Lantana foetida Rusby; Lantana glutinosa Poepp.; Lantana hispida Kunth; Lantana polyacantha Schauer; Lantana tiliifolia Cham.

= Lantana horrida =

Species of flowering plant

Lantana horrida is a species of flowering plant in the verbena family. It is found in Mexico and the West Indies to subtropical South America. It lives in a variety of habitats, including tropical savanna, forest, montane, shrubland, and grassland.

== Taxonomy ==
Lantana horrida was first described in 1818 by Karl Sigismund Kunth. Lantana horrida Kunth is sometimes confused with Lantana urticoides as the latter has several synonyms previously described as forms of Lantana horrida. While Lantana urticoides ranges into Texas and New Mexico, Lantana horrida has not been documented north of Mexico.
