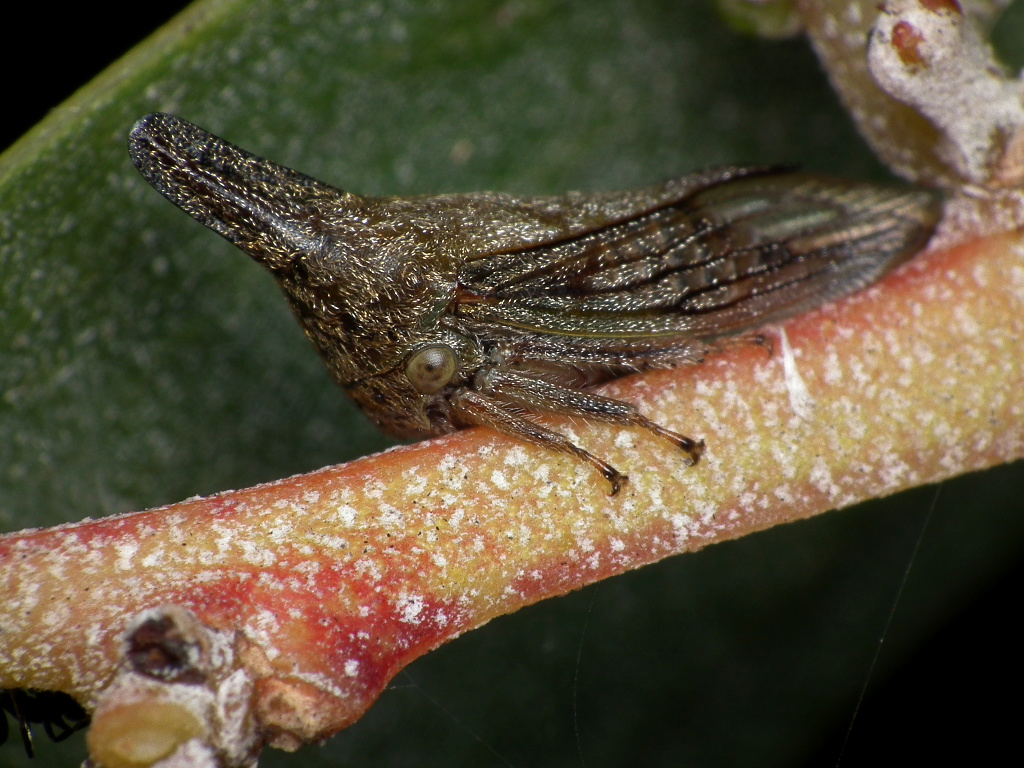

Scientific classification
- Kingdom: Animalia
- Phylum: Arthropoda
- Clade: Pancrustacea
- Class: Insecta
- Order: Hemiptera
- Suborder: Auchenorrhyncha
- Family: Membracidae
- Genus: Aconophora
- Species: A. compressa

Binomial name
- Aconophora compressa Walker, 1851

= Aconophora compressa =

Species of true bug

Aconophora compressa is a species of insect in the treehopper family, Membracidae. It is known by the common names lantana bug, lantana treehopper, lantana stemsucking treehopper, and lantana sap-sucking bug.

== Overview ==
This insect is native to Mexico, Central America, and Colombia. It is best known as an import to Australia, where it was introduced in 1995 as an agent of biological pest control for the invasive plant species lantana (Lantana camara). Since the introduction of the treehopper on lantana, it has also been found in abundance on fiddlewood (Citharexylum spinosum). The propensity of the insect to attack non-target plant species inspired greater attention to testing of potential biocontrol agents before their release. It also suggests the importance of monitoring such releases for longer periods to track their activity.

This treehopper is brown in color and up to 8 millimeters long with a thorn-shaped body. It produces a large amount of honeydew. The bug is gregarious, gathering in large numbers to suck the sap from the stems of plants. Most of its known host species are in the verbena family, Verbenaceae. In its native range in Mexico it is only associated with plants in genus Lantana. It lays eggs on the stems of the plants and then guards them against predators. The nymphs progress through five instars before reaching adulthood in about 45 days.

Before it was released in Australia the insect was tested on 62 other plants to determine if it would damage them incidentally; the common ornamental tree fiddlewood was not included in the testing. Within a few years after its release on lantana, it was reported in large numbers on fiddlewood. Some infestations were heavy, as the insects "encrusted all available branches and stems," secreting copious honeydew which then grew sooty mold, defoliating the trees and yellowing nearby lawns. Populations on fiddlewood "overflow" onto other garden plants. The insect has not been used for biological control since 2001.

The bug was tested for lantana control in South Africa, where it is a serious weed. It was found to prefer ornamental Lippia species and lemon verbena (Aloysia citrodora), and it was rejected as an agent of biocontrol.
