= Pseudopyrausta craftsialis =

Scientific classification
- Kingdom: Animalia
- Phylum: Arthropoda
- Class: Insecta
- Order: Lepidoptera
- Family: Crambidae
- Genus: Pseudopyrausta
- Species: P. craftsialis

Binomial name
- Pseudopyrausta craftsialis (Dyar, 1914)

Synonyms
- Nacoleia craftsialis Dyar, 1914

Species of moth

Pseudopyrausta craftsialis is a moth in the family Crambidae. It was described by Harrison Gray Dyar Jr. in 1914. It is found in Panama.
