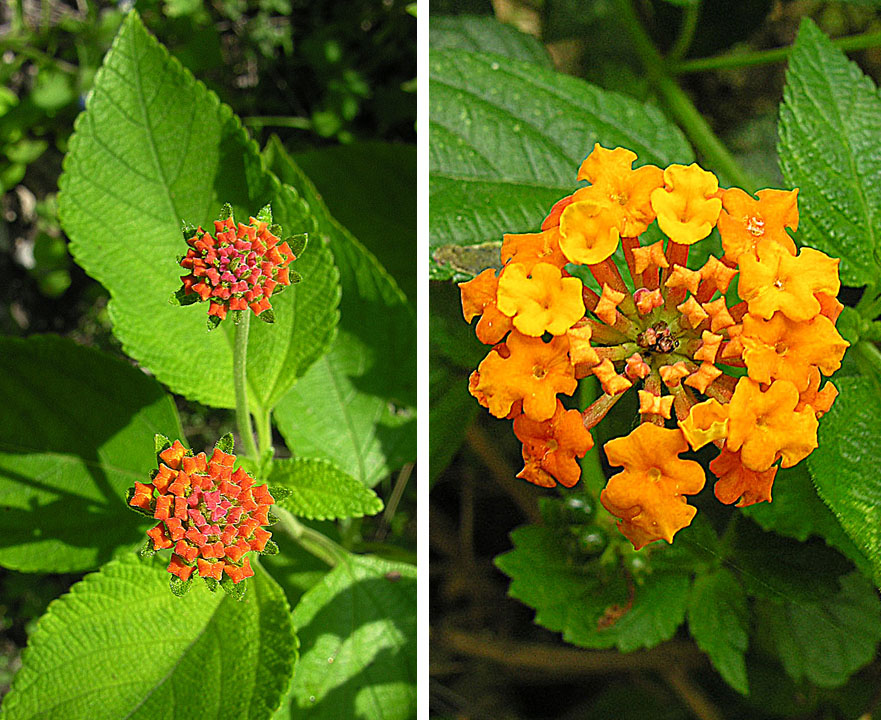

Scientific classification
- Kingdom: Plantae
- Clade: Tracheophytes
- Clade: Angiosperms
- Clade: Eudicots
- Clade: Asterids
- Order: Lamiales
- Family: Verbenaceae
- Genus: Lantana
- Species: L. urticoides

Binomial name
- Lantana urticoides Hayek

Synonyms
- Lantana hispida; Lantana notha Moldenke; Lantana scorta; Lantana urticoides var. hispidula

= Lantana urticoides =

Species of shrub

Lantana urticoides, also known as Texas Lantana, is a three- to five-foot perennial shrub that grows in Mexico and the U.S. states of Texas, Louisiana and Mississippi especially along the Gulf coast. The plant can blossom from spring until the first frost. It is a species of flowering plant within the verbena family, Verbenaceae.

== Etymology ==
The name Lantana derives from the Latin name of the wayfaring tree Viburnum lantana, the leaves of which closely resemble Lantana.
