= Paradichelia =

Scientific classification
- Domain: Eukaryota
- Kingdom: Animalia
- Phylum: Arthropoda
- Class: Insecta
- Order: Lepidoptera
- Family: Tortricidae
- Tribe: Archipini
- Genus: Paradichelia; Diakonoff, 1952

Genus of tortrix moths

Paradichelia is a genus of moths belonging to the family Tortricidae.

== Species ==
- Paradichelia basipuncta (Diakonoff, 1941)
- Paradichelia brongersmai Diakonoff, 1952
- Paradichelia clarinota Diakonoff, 1953
- Paradichelia coenographa (Meyrick, 1938)
- Paradichelia euryptycha Diakonoff, 1952
- Paradichelia fulvitacta Diakonoff, 1953
- Paradichelia ocellata Diakonoff, 1953
- Paradichelia rostrata Diakonoff, 1952

== See also ==
- List of Tortricidae genera
