= Paradichelia basipuncta =

Scientific classification
- Domain: Eukaryota
- Kingdom: Animalia
- Phylum: Arthropoda
- Class: Insecta
- Order: Lepidoptera
- Family: Tortricidae
- Genus: Paradichelia
- Species: P. basipuncta

Binomial name
- Paradichelia basipuncta (Diakonoff, 1941)

Synonyms
- Cnephasia basipuncta Diakonoff, 1941

Species of moth

Paradichelia basipuncta is a species of moth of the family Tortricidae. It is found on New Guinea.
