= Lantana alainii =

Scientific classification
- Kingdom: Plantae
- Clade: Tracheophytes
- Clade: Angiosperms
- Clade: Eudicots
- Clade: Asterids
- Order: Lamiales
- Family: Verbenaceae
- Genus: Lantana
- Species: L. alainii

Binomial name
- Lantana alainii Moldenke

Species of plant

Lantana alainii is a species of flowering plant in the family Verbenaceae. It is native to the Dominican Republic.
