= Paradichelia clarinota =

Scientific classification
- Domain: Eukaryota
- Kingdom: Animalia
- Phylum: Arthropoda
- Class: Insecta
- Order: Lepidoptera
- Family: Tortricidae
- Genus: Paradichelia
- Species: P. clarinota

Binomial name
- Paradichelia clarinota Diakonoff, 1953

Species of moth

Paradichelia clarinota is a species of moth of the family Tortricidae. It is found on New Guinea.
