= Paradichelia rostrata =

Scientific classification
- Kingdom: Animalia
- Phylum: Arthropoda
- Class: Insecta
- Order: Lepidoptera
- Family: Tortricidae
- Genus: Paradichelia
- Species: P. rostrata

Binomial name
- Paradichelia rostrata Diakonoff, 1952

Species of moth

Paradichelia rostrata is a species of moth of the family Tortricidae. It is found on New Guinea.
