= Pseudopyrausta minima =

Scientific classification
- Domain: Eukaryota
- Kingdom: Animalia
- Phylum: Arthropoda
- Class: Insecta
- Order: Lepidoptera
- Family: Crambidae
- Genus: Pseudopyrausta
- Species: P. minima

Binomial name
- Pseudopyrausta minima (Hedemann, 1894)

Synonyms
- Synclera minima Hedemann, 1894

Species of moth

Pseudopyrausta minima is a moth in the family Crambidae. It was described by W. von Hedemann in 1894. It is found on the Virgin Islands.
