= Pseudopyrausta =

Scientific classification
- Domain: Eukaryota
- Kingdom: Animalia
- Phylum: Arthropoda
- Class: Insecta
- Order: Lepidoptera
- Family: Crambidae
- Subfamily: Pyraustinae
- Genus: Pseudopyrausta; Amsel, 1956

Genus of moths

Pseudopyrausta is a genus of moths of the family Crambidae. The genus was erected by Hans Georg Amsel in 1956.

== Species ==
- Pseudopyrausta acutangulalis (Snellen, 1875)
- Pseudopyrausta craftsialis (Dyar, 1914)
- Pseudopyrausta cubanalis (Schaus, 1920)
- Pseudopyrausta marginalis (Dyar, 1914)
- Pseudopyrausta minima (Hedemann, 1894)
- Pseudopyrausta santatalis (Barnes & McDunnough, 1914)
