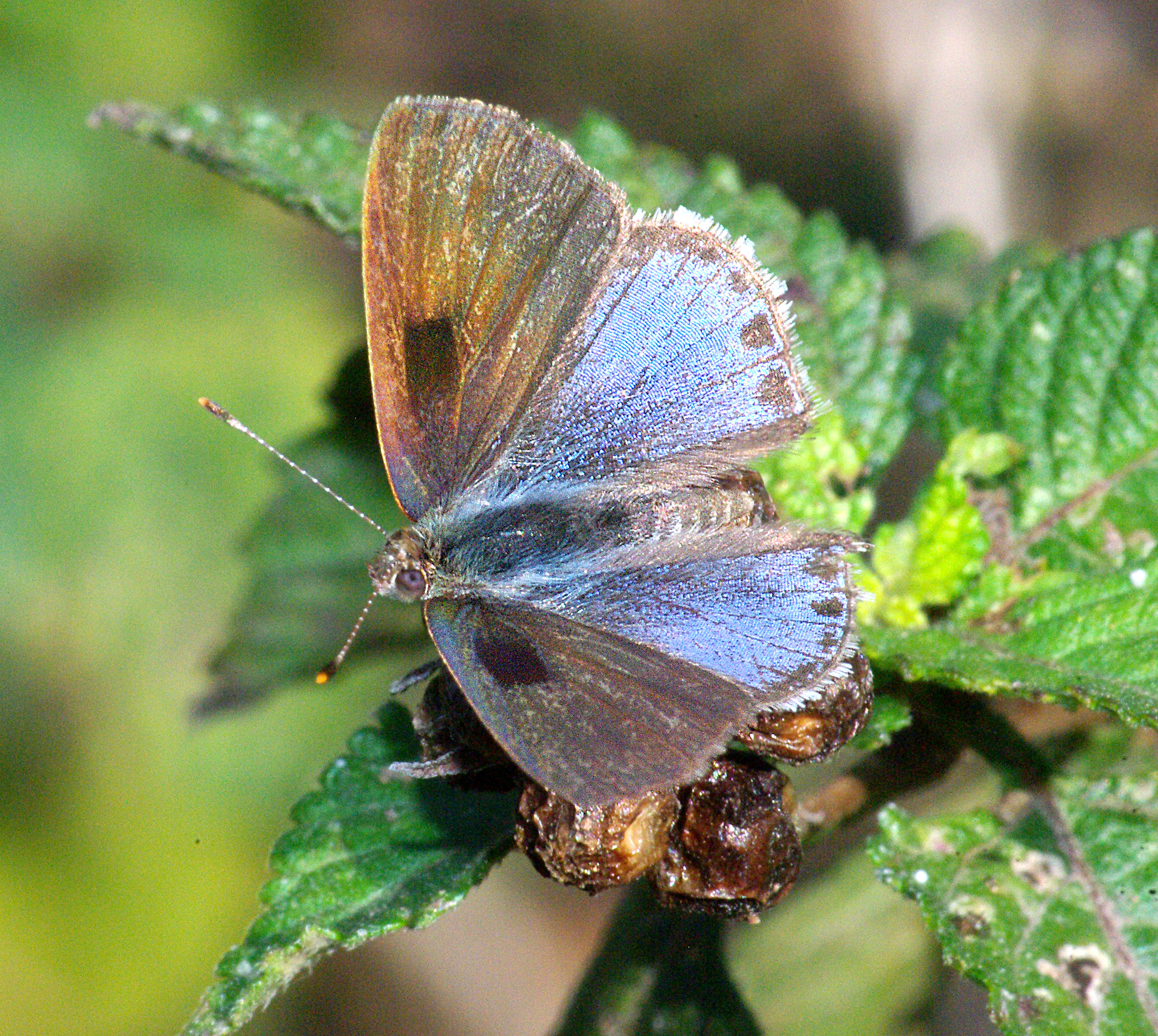

Scientific classification
- Domain: Eukaryota
- Kingdom: Animalia
- Phylum: Arthropoda
- Class: Insecta
- Order: Lepidoptera
- Family: Lycaenidae
- Genus: Strymon
- Species: S. bazochii

Binomial name
- Strymon bazochii (Godart, [1824])

Synonyms
- Polyommatus bazochii Godart, [1824]; Hyreus thius Geyer, 1832; Thecla agra Hewitson, 1868; Thecla infrequens Weeks, 1901; Strymon gundlachianus Bates, 1935; Strymon diagonalis Austin & Johnson, 1997

= Strymon bazochii =

Species of butterfly

Strymon bazochii, the lantana scrub-hairstreak or smaller lantana butterfly, is a butterfly in the family Lycaenidae. It is found from Paraguay north through Central America, the West Indies and Mexico to southern Texas. It was introduced to Hawaii in 1902 to control Lantana species, in which it has proven unsuccessful.

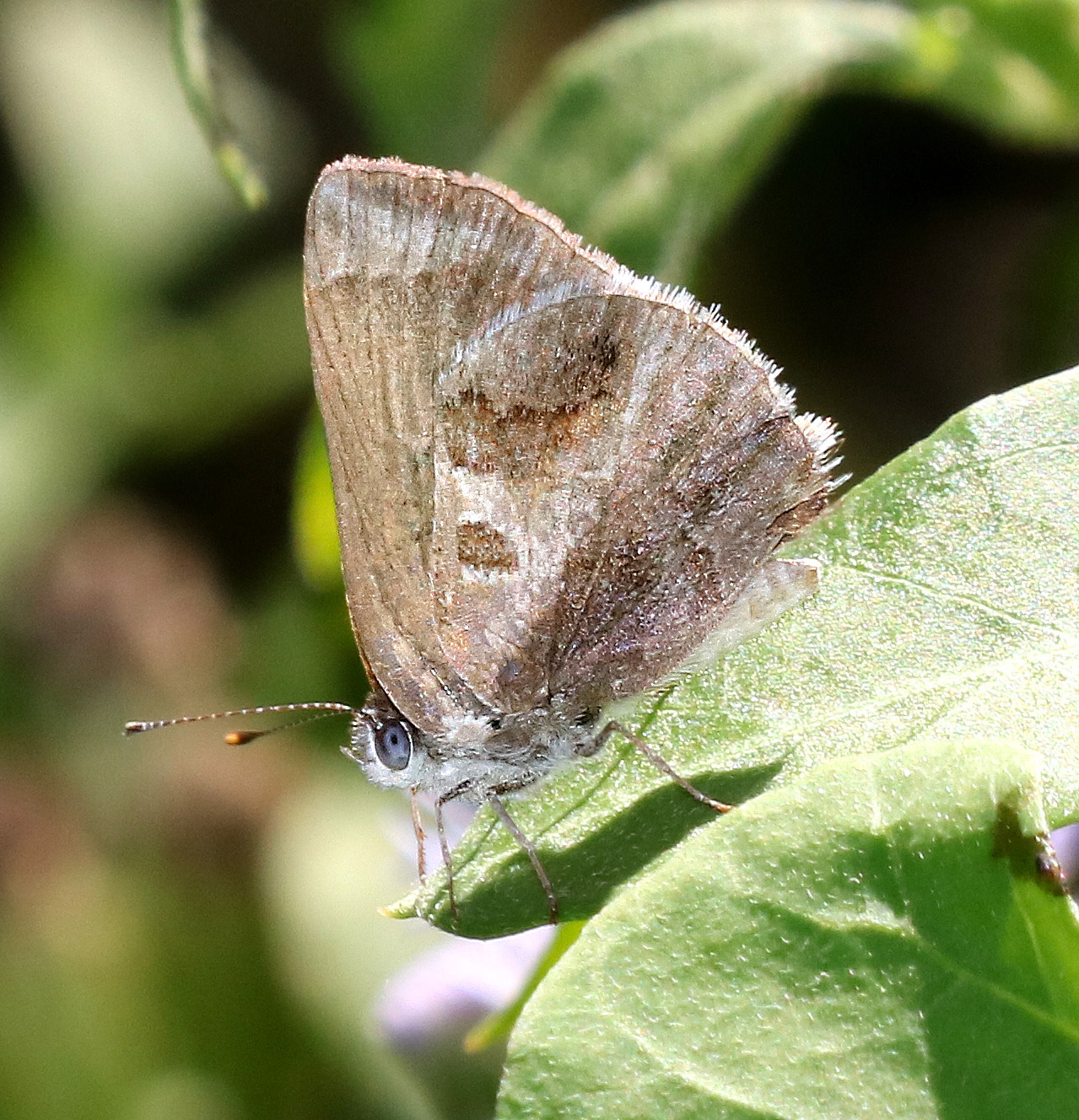

The wingspan is 22–25 mm. Adults are on wing from May to December. There are two to three generations per year.

The larvae feed on Lippia alba and Lippia graveolens in Texas. In Hawaii, they feed on Lantana species and basils. Adults feed on nectar from various flowers, including Bidens alba, Lantana species and Stachytarpheta jamaicensis.

== Characteristics ==
Strymon bazochii generally have metallic, brown wings with speckled, blue hues. Their eyes are grey. There are slight differences between male and female. Male butterflies will display horizontal, white lines on their wings. Females do not exhibit this pattern.

== Life cycle ==
=== Metamorphosis ===
Like other butterflies, lantana scrub-hairstreaks undergo metamorphosis. Eggs are deposited in the plant species of Lantana Urticoides. Within an average of thirty-one days, a caterpillar will have grown and begun forming its chrysalis. Over time, the protective layer will harden and exhibit a dark brown color, indicating the imminent emergence of the butterfly.
