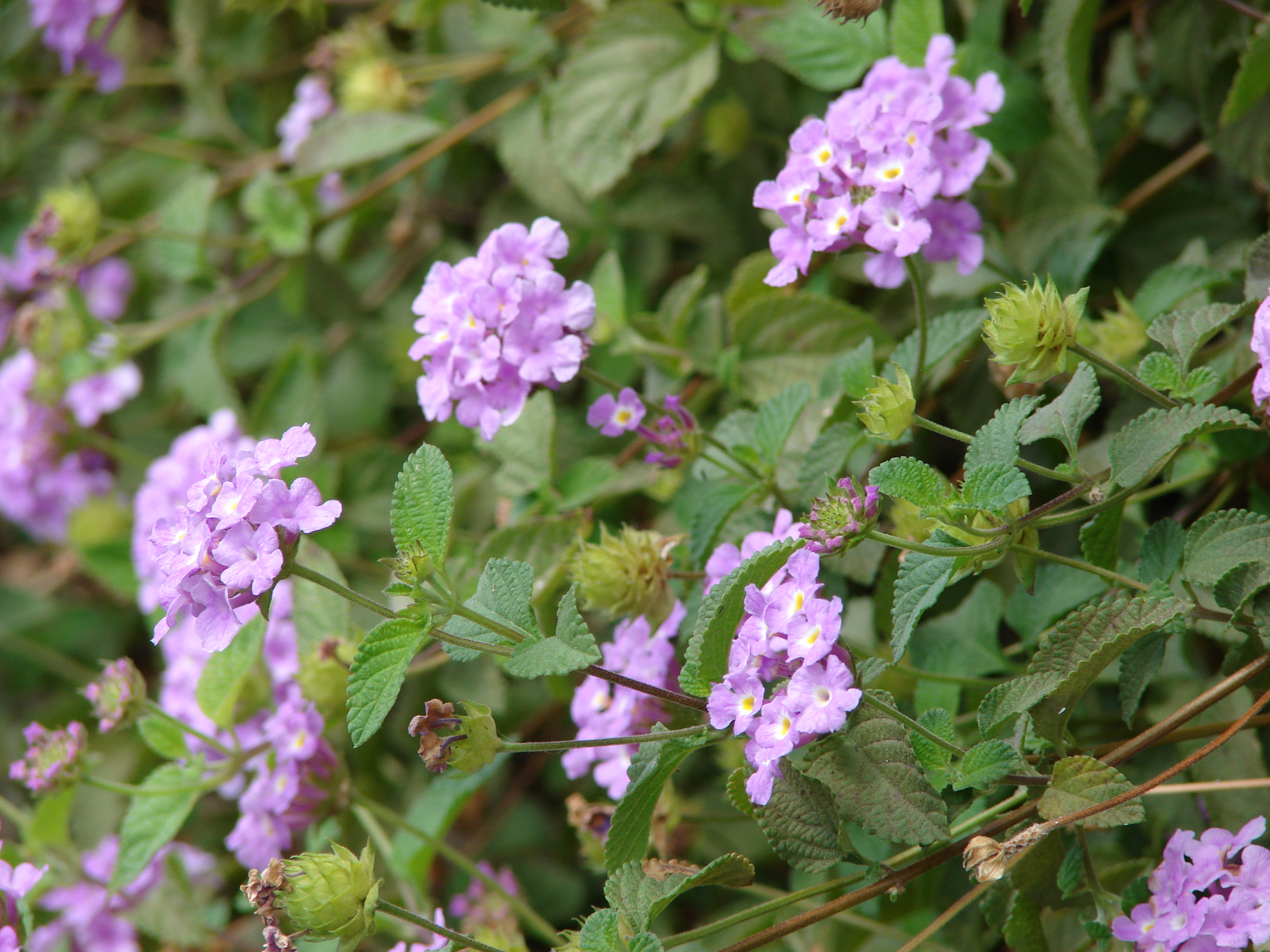

Scientific classification
- Kingdom: Plantae
- Clade: Embryophytes
- Clade: Tracheophytes
- Clade: Spermatophytes
- Clade: Angiosperms
- Clade: Eudicots
- Clade: Asterids
- Order: Lamiales
- Family: Verbenaceae
- Genus: Lantana
- Species: L. montevidensis

Binomial name
- Lantana montevidensis (Spreng.) Briq.

Synonyms
- Lantana sellowiana Lippia montevidensis

= Lantana montevidensis =

Species of vine

Lantana montevidensis is a species of lantana native to South America that often forms dense thickets and mats over the ground. It is known by many common names, such as: trailing lantana, weeping lantana, creeping lantana, small lantana, purple lantana or trailing shrubverbena.

The name Lantana derives from the Latin name of the wayfaring tree Viburnum lantana, the flowers of which closely resemble Lantana. The name montevidensis derives from the city Montevideo, Uruguay, where the species originated.

== Description ==
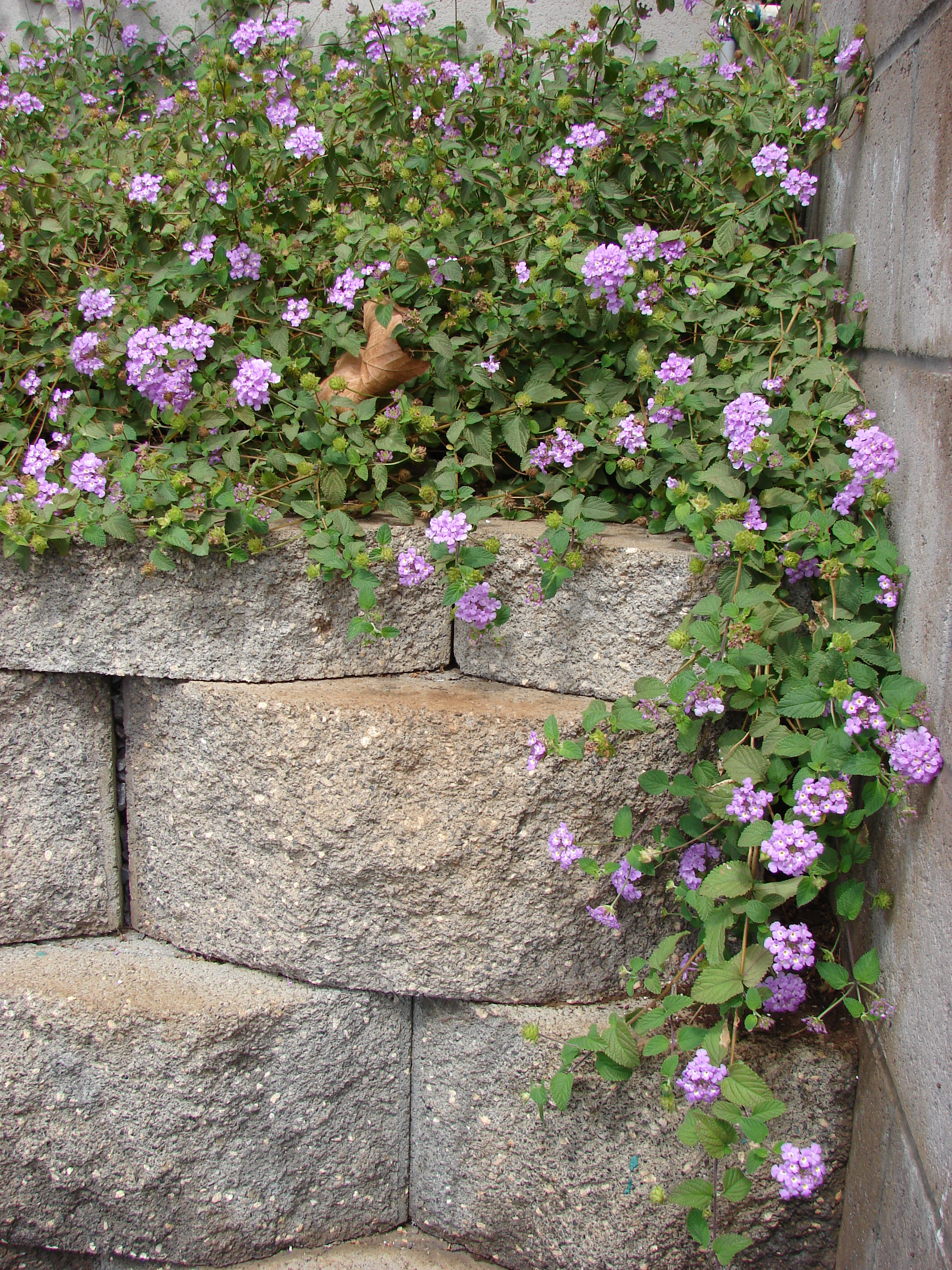
Trailing down a wall on garden bed

Lantana montevidensis is a small strongly scented flowering, trailing or rambling, shrub or subshrub with oval-shaped green leaves that forms a mat. With support it has a climbing 'vine' form, when on edge a trailing form, and on the flat a groundcover form. The plant has thin, creeping or drooping, hairy stems or branches up to 1 m long, sometimes to 4 m in propitious conditions, 1–2 mm thick, and are usually quadrangular in cross-section when young and, unlike Lantana camara, free of prickles. They may produce roots at their nodes as they come into contact with the soil.

The bright green leaves are ovate to oblong-ovate (egg-shaped) and sometimes narrowly ovate, about 2.5 cm long, and roughly serrated, with a short petiole. Oppositely arranged and borne on short stalks, the leaves are in opposite pairs on the stem, with successive pairs borne at right angles to each other. The leaves' upper surfaces are coarse (i.e. scabrous), whereas their undersides are tenderly hairy (i.e. pubescent).

=== Inflorescence ===
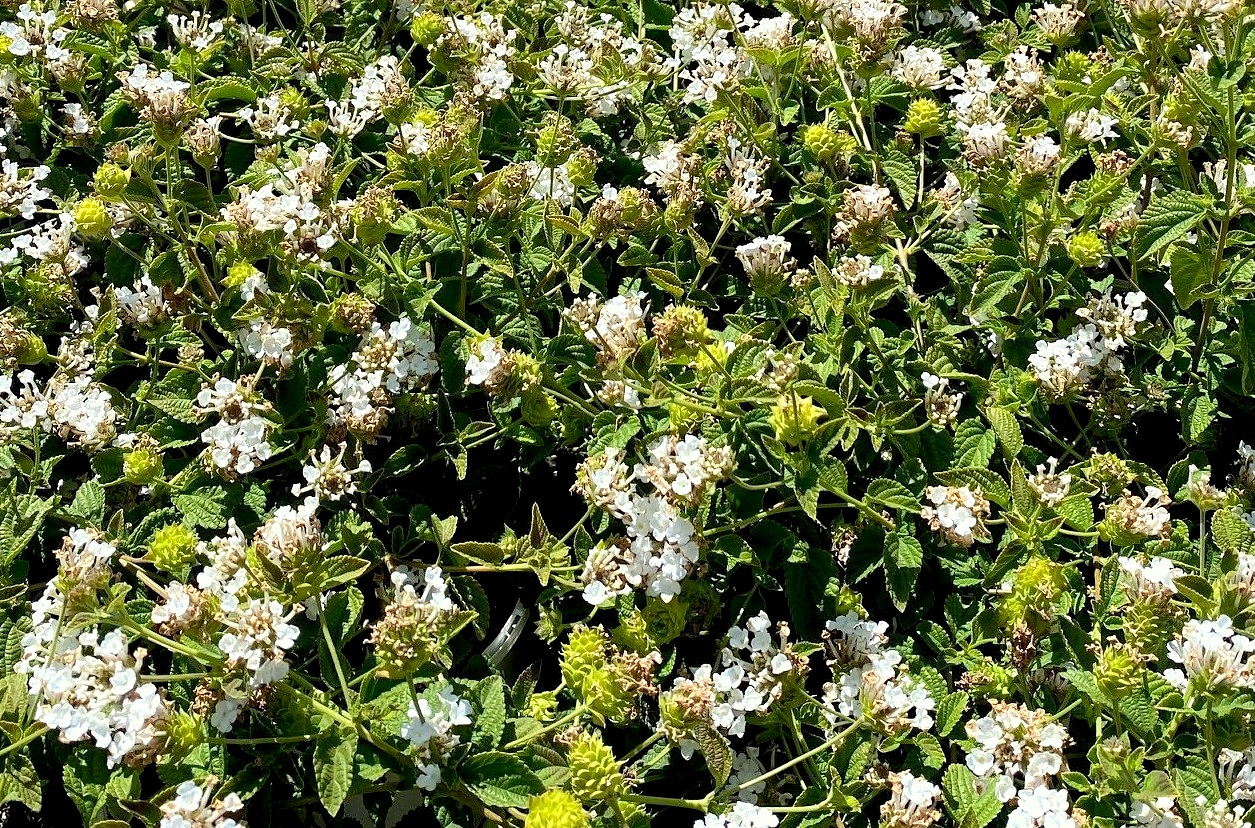
White-flowered variety

The inflorescence is a circular head of several (usually 20) purple to lavender and white funnel-shaped flowers with lobed corollas each nearly a centimeter wide. The pinkish-lilac flowers grow in 3 cm wide clusters on long flower stalks. They are 8–12 mm long and 4–8 mm wide. It flowers most of the year in frost-free areas, though blooming peaks in spring and summer. The peduncle is 2–8 cm long; bracts are broad to ovate, 4–7 mm long and corolla is 8–12 mm long.

Yellow-flowered montevidensis are a case of misidentification and most often relate to the "New Gold" lantana Lantana × hybrida, a hybrid between camara and montevidensis. Occasionally these yellow-flowered plants are misidentified Lantana depressa var. depressa, a Florida endemic taxon more closely related to Lantana camara with smaller, less robust flowers.

The fleshy fruit is green when young and reddish-purple when ripe. Featuring a black seed, the fruit is spherical in shape, with poisonous drupes 5-7 mm in size. It consists of a pair of nutlets surrounded by flesh somewhat like a berry.

== Cultivation ==
Lantana montevidensis is also cultivated as an ornamental plant for its plentiful colorful lavender to purple flowers and as a drought tolerant groundcover, woody vine, and trailing plant for containers and in the ground. In subtropical climates there are flowers most of the year, with variegated leaved cultivars also available. It is a hardy, long-lived shrub that can withstand periods of extended drought and an ability to grow and reproduce under both shade and full sun. This plant is toxic to livestock.

== Distribution ==
Native to Uruguay, northeastern and northwestern Argentina, Bolivia, Paraguay and southern Brazil, the plant is present nearly worldwide as an introduced species of garden and landscape plant, where it is naturalized in New Zealand, Hawaii, New Caledonia and southern United States (i.e. California, Texas, Louisiana, Alabama, Georgia and Florida). In some areas, such as parts of Australia and Hawaii, it is a noxious weed and invasive species. It is found typically in tropical and subtropical environments, and sporadically in temperate and semi-arid areas.

In Australia, the plant was first introduced as an ornamental in 1851, and began escaping the garden in 1871. Today, it is found in well drained wildernesss in alluvial soil, eucalyptus forest in loamy soil and on sandstone rocks, disturbed areas near mangroves, and beside roadsides and river banks. Its seeds are spread extensively by fruit-eating animals and birds, water running over the soil surface during heavy rain and in mud sticking to hooves and footwear. It can also spread vegetatively by layering.
