= Pseudopyrausta marginalis =

Scientific classification
- Kingdom: Animalia
- Phylum: Arthropoda
- Class: Insecta
- Order: Lepidoptera
- Family: Crambidae
- Genus: Pseudopyrausta
- Species: P. marginalis

Binomial name
- Pseudopyrausta marginalis (Dyar, 1914)

Synonyms
- Nacoleia marginalis Dyar, 1914

Species of moth

Pseudopyrausta marginalis is a moth belonging to the Crambidae family. It was described by Harrison Gray Dyar Jr. in 1914. It is found in Panama and North America, where it has been recorded from Alaska, Quebec, Texas and Wisconsin.

The wingspan is 14–15 mm. Adults are on wing from May to November.
