= Pseudopyrausta cubanalis =

Scientific classification
- Kingdom: Animalia
- Phylum: Arthropoda
- Class: Insecta
- Order: Lepidoptera
- Family: Crambidae
- Genus: Pseudopyrausta
- Species: P. cubanalis

Binomial name
- Pseudopyrausta cubanalis (Schaus, 1920)

Synonyms
- Bocchoris cubanalis Schaus, 1920

Species of moth

Pseudopyrausta cubanalis is a moth of the family Crambidae described by William Schaus in 1920.

It is native to Cuba and has a wingspan of 15 mm.
