= Paradichelia ocellata =

Scientific classification
- Domain: Eukaryota
- Kingdom: Animalia
- Phylum: Arthropoda
- Class: Insecta
- Order: Lepidoptera
- Family: Tortricidae
- Genus: Paradichelia
- Species: P. ocellata

Binomial name
- Paradichelia ocellata Diakonoff, 1953

Species of moth

Paradichelia ocellata is a species of moth of the family Tortricidae. It is found on New Guinea.
