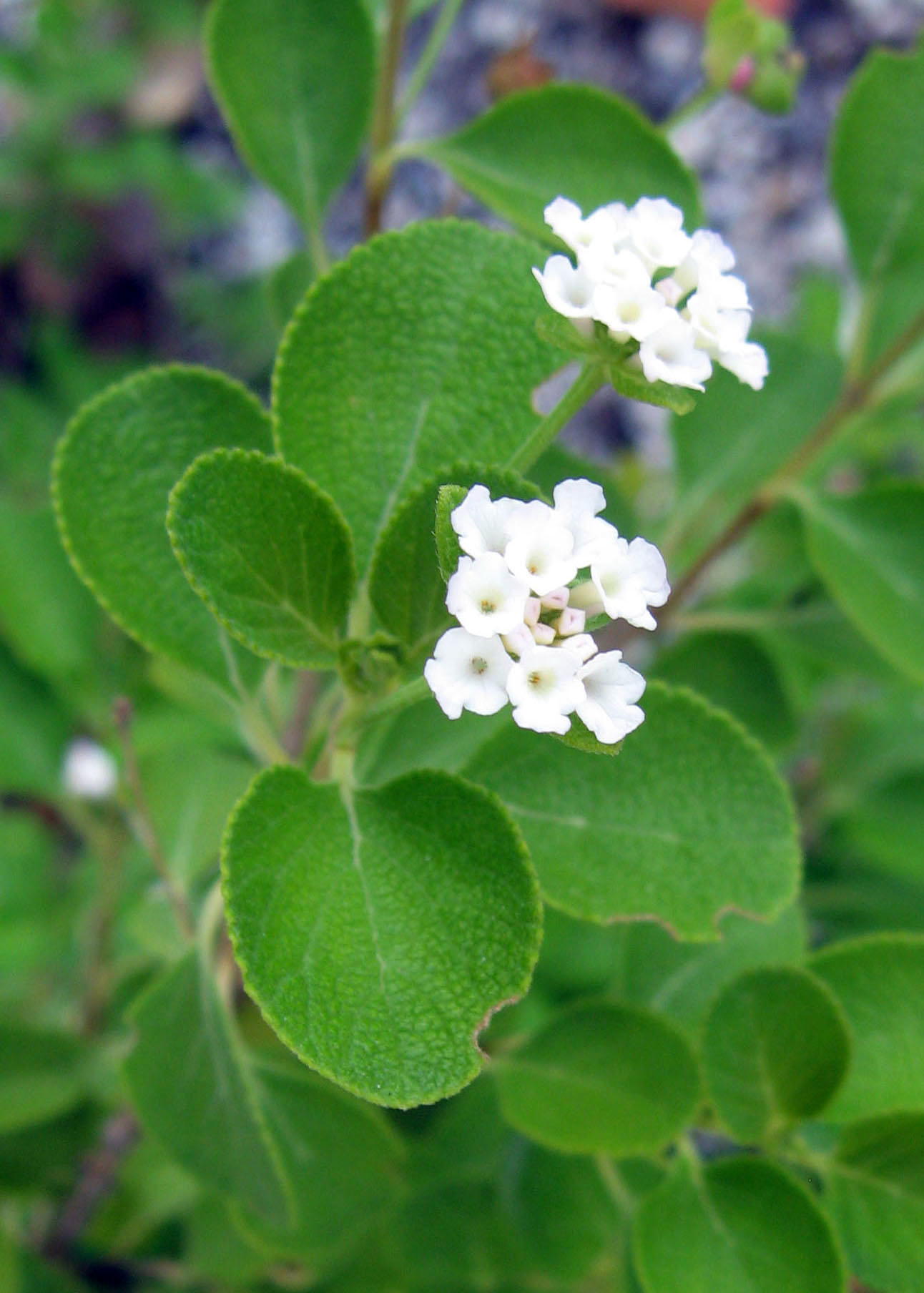

Conservation status
- Least Concern (IUCN 3.1)

Scientific classification
- Kingdom: Plantae
- Clade: Tracheophytes
- Clade: Angiosperms
- Clade: Eudicots
- Clade: Asterids
- Order: Lamiales
- Family: Verbenaceae
- Genus: Lantana
- Species: L. involucrata

Binomial name
- Lantana involucrata L.

Synonyms
- Lantana odorata L.

= Lantana involucrata =

Species of flowering plant

Lantana involucrata, commonly known as buttonsage, is a species of flowering plant in the verbena family. It is native to the Neotropical realm, where it is widespread in well-drained areas.

== Etymology ==
The name Lantana derives from the Latin name of the wayfaring tree Viburnum lantana, the flowers of which superficially resemble Lantana.

== Description ==
The plant blooms and fruits all year long.

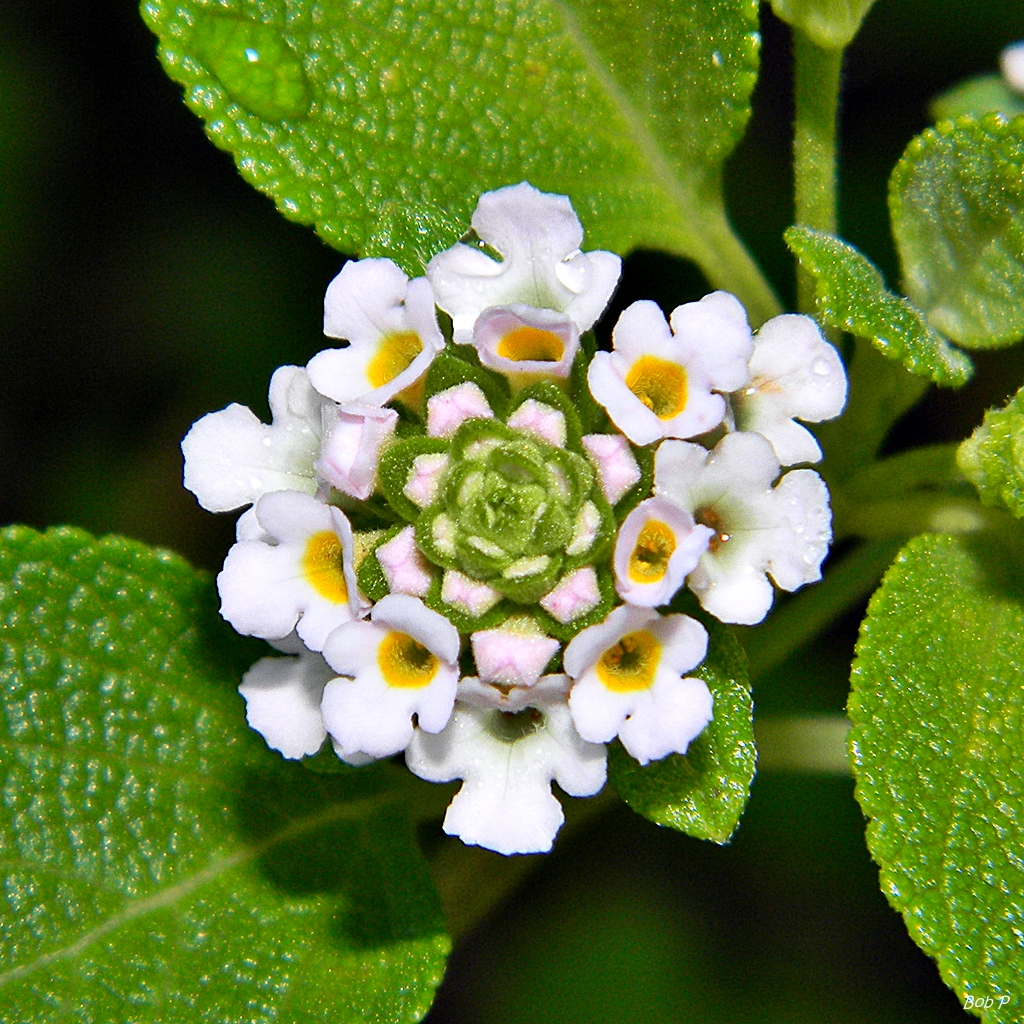
Detail of flowers
