= Pseudopyrausta santatalis =

Scientific classification
- Domain: Eukaryota
- Kingdom: Animalia
- Phylum: Arthropoda
- Class: Insecta
- Order: Lepidoptera
- Family: Crambidae
- Genus: Pseudopyrausta
- Species: P. santatalis

Binomial name
- Pseudopyrausta santatalis (Barnes & McDunnough, 1914)

Synonyms
- Blepharomastix santatalis Barnes & McDunnough, 1914

Species of moth

Pseudopyrausta santatalis is a moth in the family Crambidae. It was described by William Barnes and James Halliday McDunnough in 1914. It is found in the United States, where it has been recorded from southern Texas and Florida. It is also found in the West Indies and Mexico.

The wingspan is about 15 mm. The forewings are white, suffused with ocherous. The hindwings are white, shaded with ocherous. Adults have been recorded on wing from February to October.
