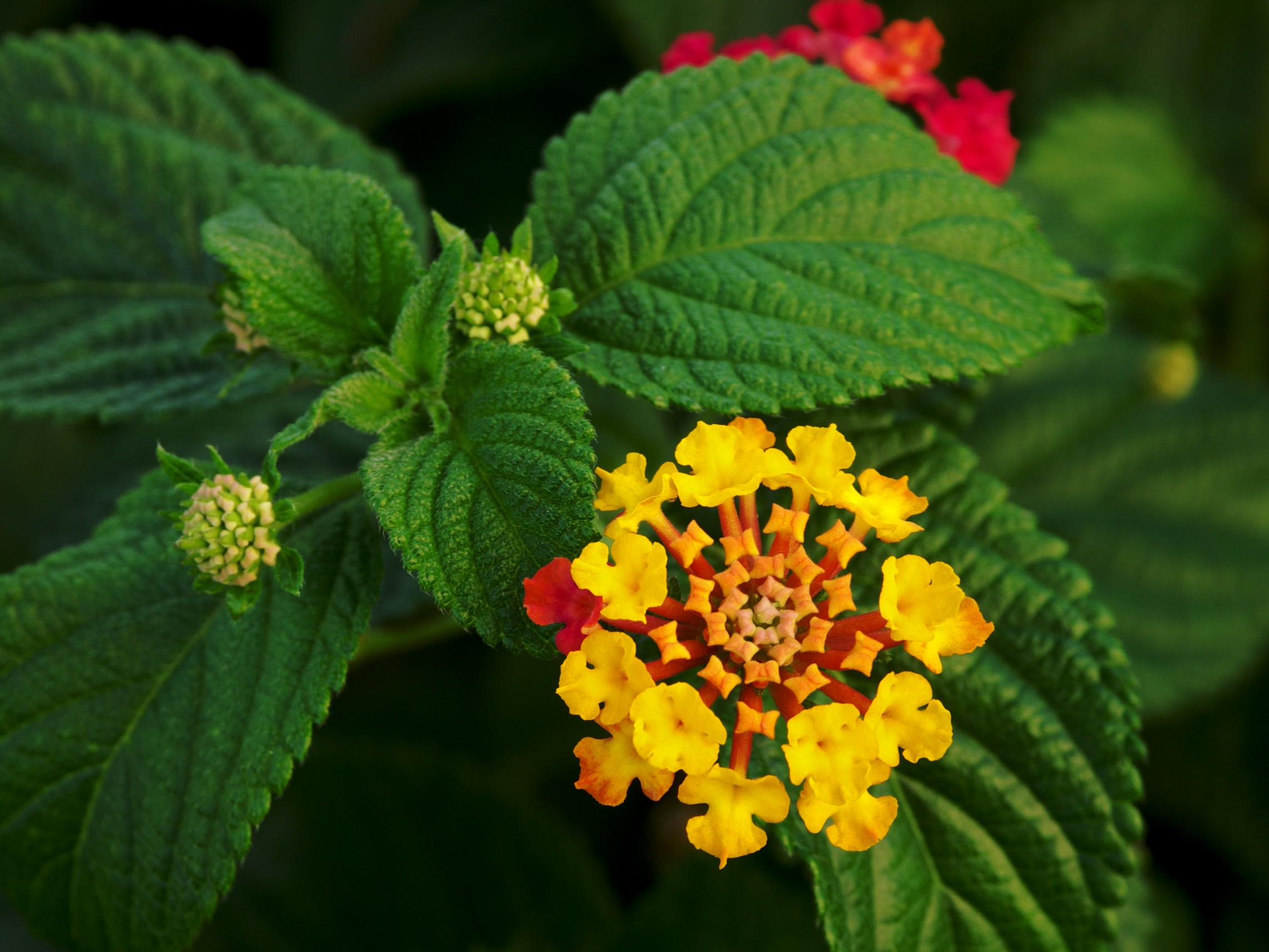
- Wild-type Spanish flag (Lantana camara)

Scientific classification
- Kingdom: Plantae
- Clade: Tracheophytes
- Clade: Angiosperms
- Clade: Eudicots
- Clade: Asterids
- Order: Lamiales
- Family: Verbenaceae
- Genus: Lantana; L.

Type species
- Lantana camara L.

= Lantana =

Genus of flowering plants

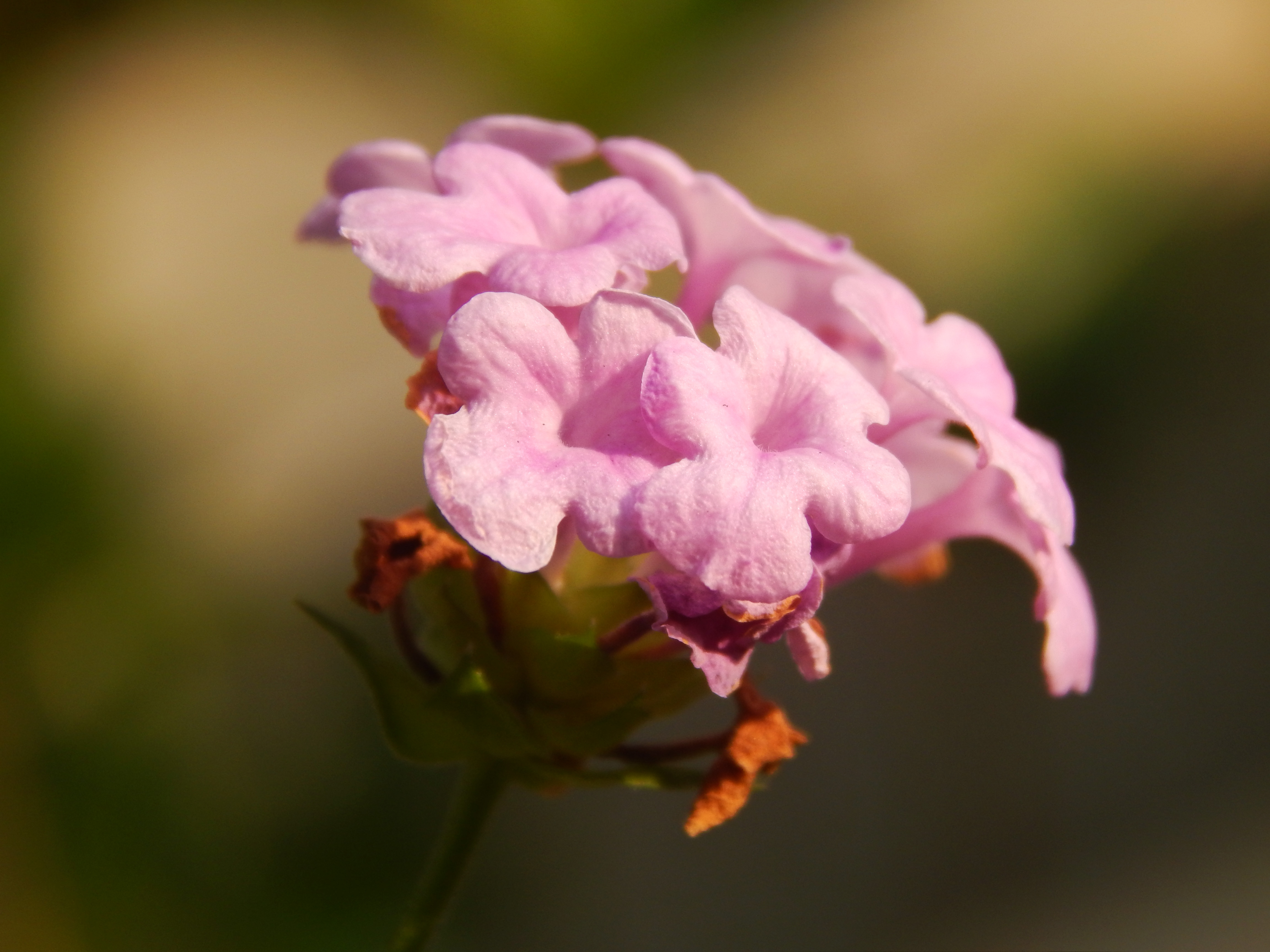
Lantana Violet color from Arecode, Kerala, India

Lantana (/lænˈtænə, -ˈtɑː-/) is a genus of about 150 species of perennial flowering plants in the verbena family, Verbenaceae. They are native to tropical regions of the Americas but exist as an introduced species in numerous areas, especially in the Australian-Pacific region, South and Northeastern part of India. The genus includes both herbaceous plants and shrubs growing to 0.5–2 m (1.6–6.6 ft) tall. Their common names are shrub verbenas or lantanas. The generic name originated in Late Latin, where it refers to the unrelated Viburnum lantana.

Lantana's aromatic flower clusters (called umbels) are a mix of red, orange, yellow, or blue and white florets. Other colors exist as new varieties are being selected. The flowers typically change color as they mature, resulting in inflorescences that are two- or three-colored.

"Wild lantanas" are plants of the unrelated genus Abronia, usually called "sand-verbenas".

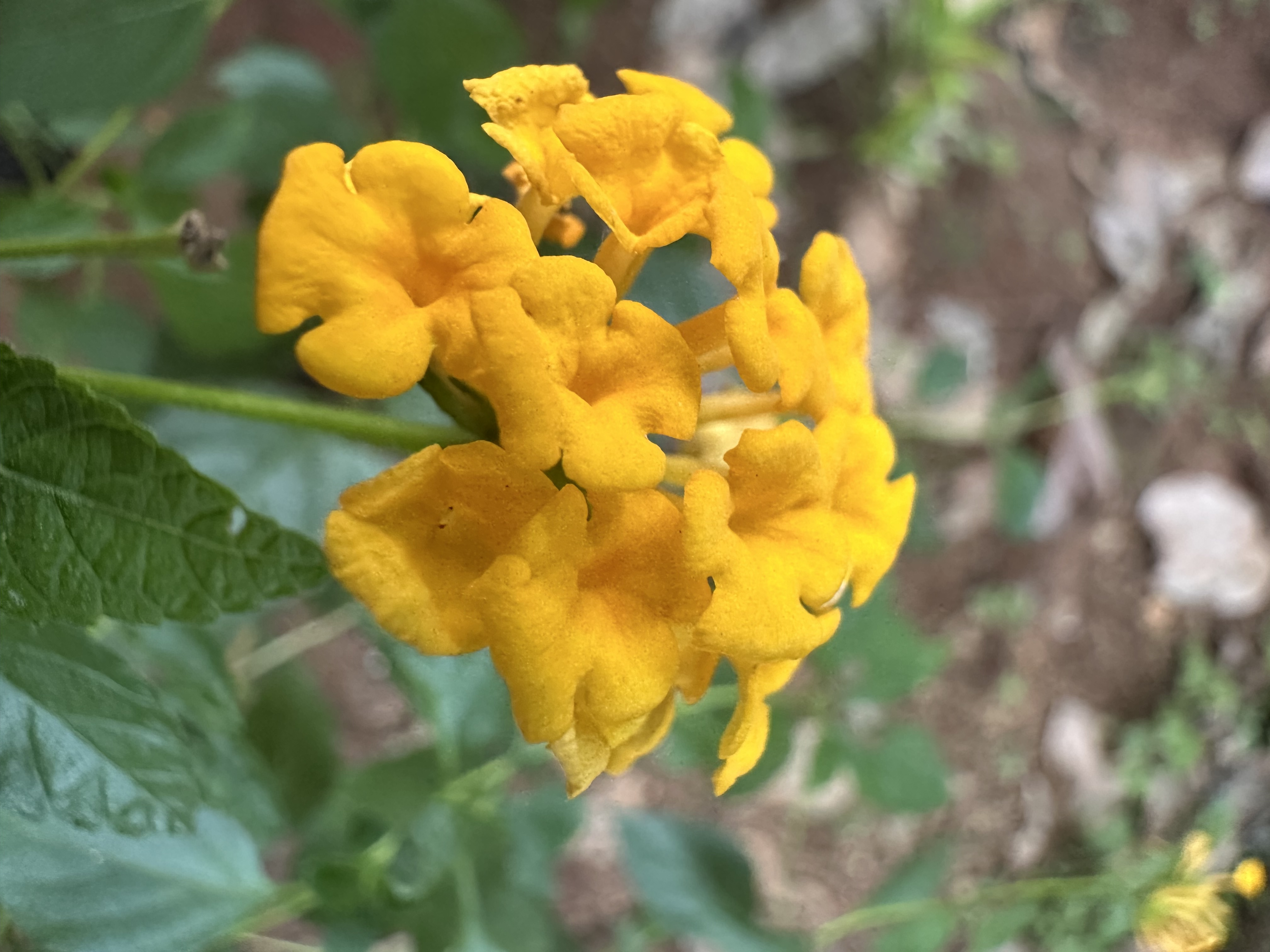
Yellow color Lantana flower from Neeleswaram, Kozhikode, Kerala, India

== Ecology ==
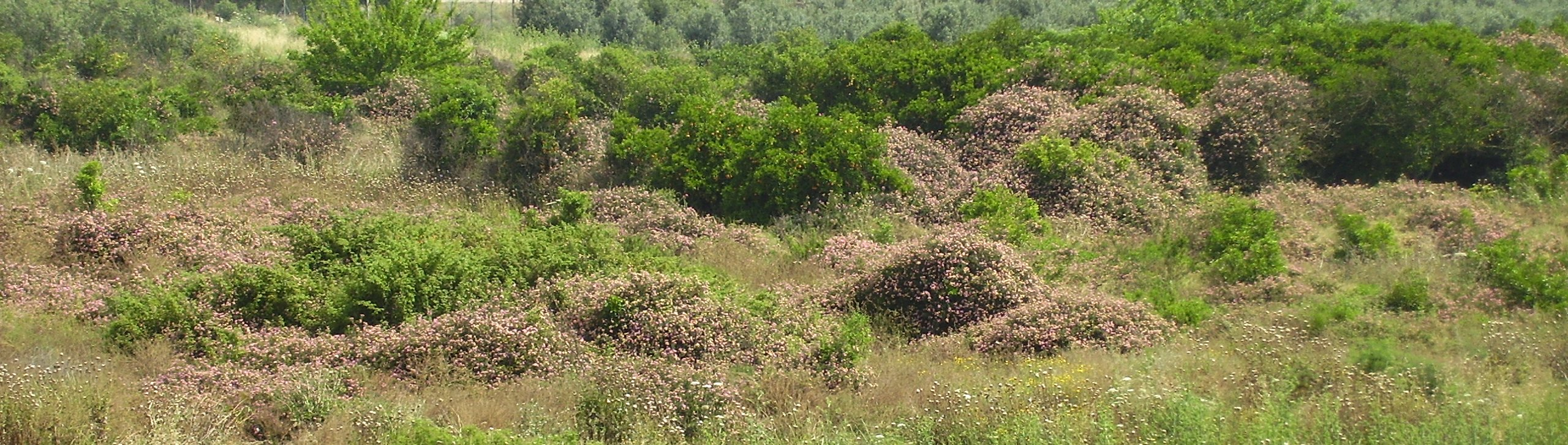
Lantana overgrowing an abandoned plantation in Sdei Hemed, Israel

Some species are invasive, and are considered to be noxious weeds, such as in South Asia, Southern Africa and Australia. In the United States, lantanas are invasive in Hawai’i and the southeast, especially coastal regions of the Carolinas, Georgia, Florida, and the Gulf Coast.

The spread of lantana is aided by the fact that their leaves are poisonous to most animals and thus avoided by herbivores, while their fruit is a delicacy for many birds, including the yellow-fronted white-eye of Vanuatu, the superb fairy-wren in Australia, the scaly-breasted munia, and the Mauritius bulbul in the Mascarenes; these distribute the seeds and thereby spread lantana throughout the ecosystem.

Biological control of introduced lantanas has been attempted, without robust success. In Australia, about 30 insects have been introduced in an attempt to control the spread of lantanas, and this has caused problems of its own. The lantana bug (Aconophora compressa) for example is a polyphagous species introduced in 1995 that feeds on dozens of plants, and not only has it failed to have a noticeable impact on the lantana population, it has even become a pest in horticulture, parasitizing the related fiddlewoods (Citharexylum). The small Lantana-feeding moths Epinotia lantana and Lantanophaga pusillidactyla, while not becoming pests, have nonetheless failed to stem the spread of the invasive weed, as has the lantana scrub-hairstreak butterfly (Strymon bazochii) which was introduced to control lantanas on the Hawaiian Islands.

Other Lepidoptera whose caterpillars feed on lantana species include the common splendid ghost moth (Aenetus ligniveren), Aenetus scotti, Endoclita malabaricus, Hypercompe orsa and the setaceous Hebrew character (Xestia c-nigrum). The swamp wallaby (Wallabia bicolor) is one of the few mammals that eat lantana leaves without apparent ill effect.

Lantanas are useful as honey plants, and Spanish flag (L. camara), L. lilacina and L. trifolia are sometimes planted for this purpose, or in butterfly gardening. Butterflies which are attracted to lantana flowers are most notably Papilioninae (swallowtail and birdwing butterflies). Hesperiidae (skippers) and certain brush-footed butterflies (namely Danainae and Heliconiinae), as well as some Pieridae (e.g. cloudless sulphur, Phoebis sennae), Lycaenidae (e.g. the aforementioned lantana scrub-hairstreak), and Nymphalidae (e.g. Greta oto) also like to visit the plants' flowers. Consequently, as total eradication of Lantana seems often impossible, it may in many cases be better to simply remove plants with immature (green) fruit to prevent them from spreading.

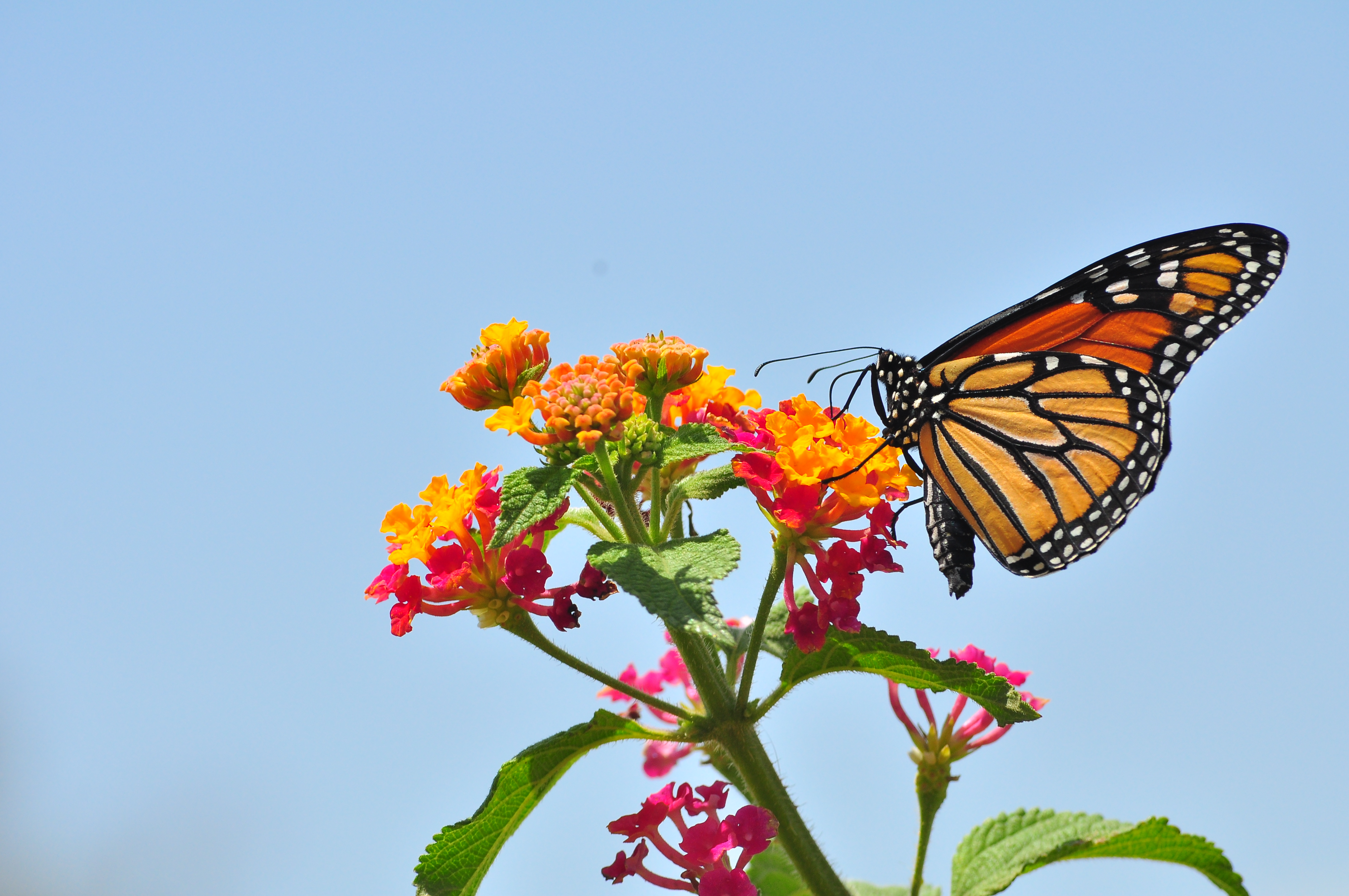
Lantana can be used in butterfly gardening.

Some weaverbirds such as the black-throated weaver (Ploceus benghalensis) and the streaked weaver (P. manyar) highly value Lantana flowers for decorating their nests. An ability to procure spectacular and innovative decorations appears to be desired by females, and consequently is an indicator of the males' fitness.

In Australia it has been found that removing Lantana from urban greenspaces can have negative impacts on bird diversity locally, as it provides refuge for species like the superb fairy (Malurus cyaneus) and silvereye (Zosterops lateralis) in the absence of native plant equivalents. There seems to be a density threshold at which too much Lantana (thus homogeneity in vegetation cover) can lead to a decrease in bird species richness or abundance.

Ceratobasidium cornigerum is a higher fungus which parasitizes Lantana among other plants. The sweet potato whitefly (Bemisia tabaci) is a common greenhouse pest and is often distributed with infested lantanas.

Lantana species, especially L. camara, contain pentacyclic triterpenoids that cause hepatotoxicity and photosensitivity when ingested by grazing animals such as sheep, goats, bovines, and horses. This has led to widespread livestock loss in the United States, South Africa, India, Mexico, and Australia.

== Uses ==
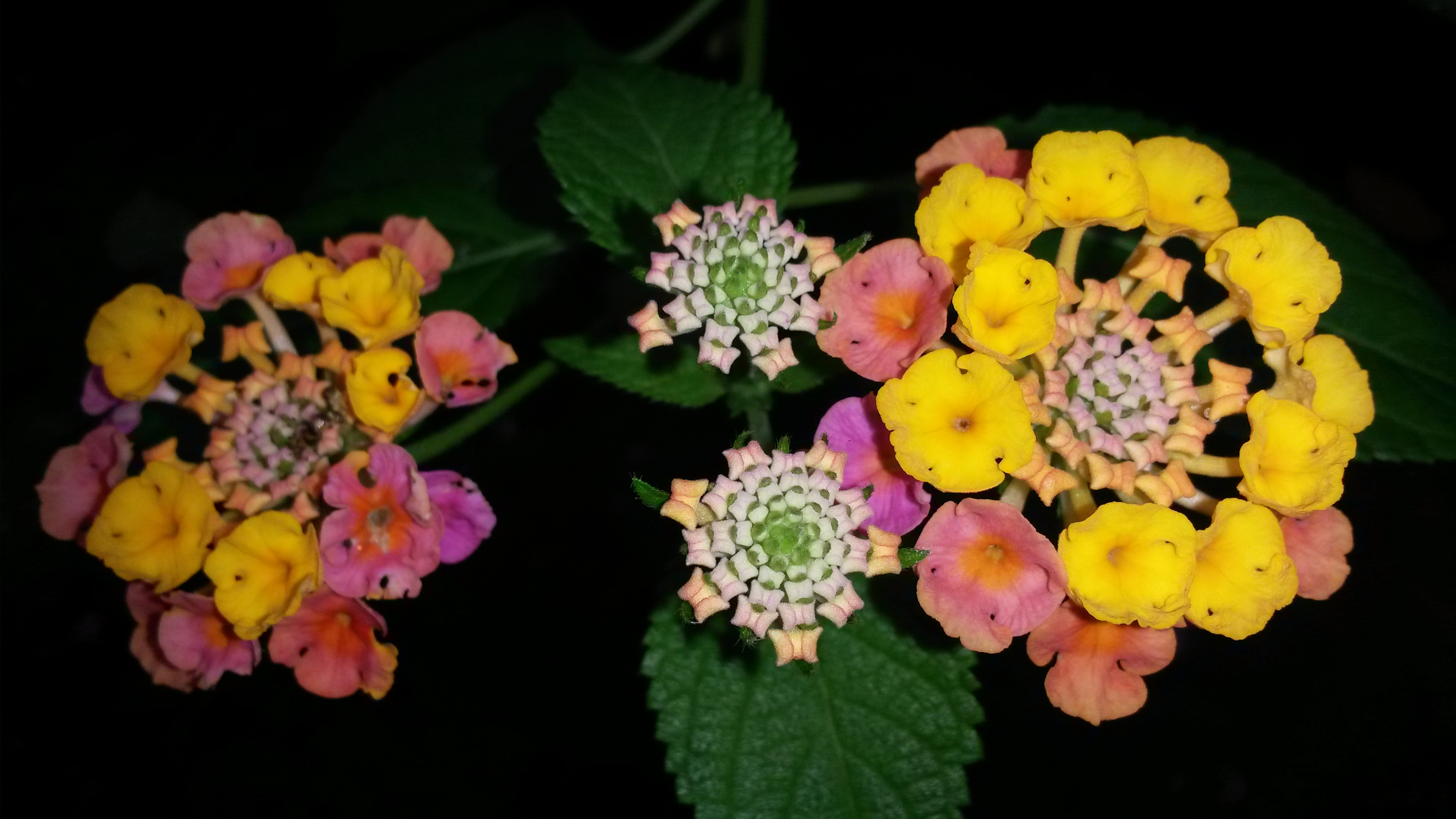
Multi-color Lantana flower

Lantana species are widely cultivated for their flowers in tropical and subtropical environments and (as an annual plant) in temperate climates.

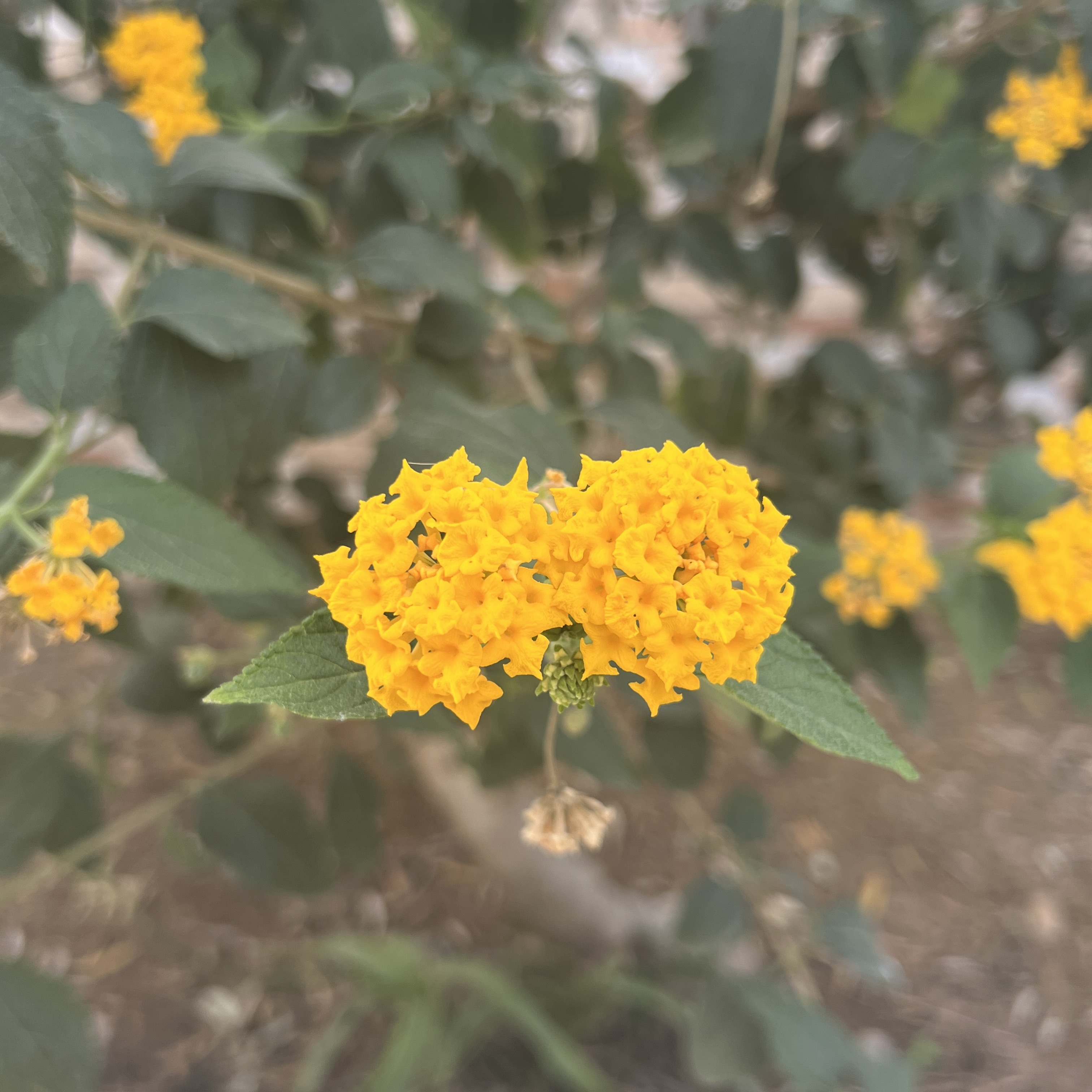
Lantana

Most of the plants sold as lantana are either Spanish flag (species of section Lantana and their hybrids, including L. camara, L. depressa, L. hirsuta, L. horrida, L. splendens, L. strigocamara, etc.), or trailing lantana (L. montevidensis). Numerous cultivars of the Spanish flag exist, including 'Irene', 'Christine' and 'Dallas Red' (all tall-growing cultivars) and several recently introduced shorter ones. The shorter cultivars may flower more prolifically than the taller ones. Lantana montevidensis gives blue (or white) flowers all year round. Its foliage is dark green and has a distinct odor.

Although lantanas are generally hardy and, being somewhat toxic, usually rejected by herbivores, they may still become infested with pests.

The edibility of Lantana berries is contested. Some experts claim Lantana berries are edible when ripe though like many other kinds of fruit, they are mildly poisonous if eaten while still green. Other experts claim that experimental research indicates that both unripe and ripe Lantana berries are potentially lethal, despite the claims by others that ripe berries are not poisonous.

Extracts of Lantana camara may be used for protection of cabbage against the aphid Lipaphis erysimi.

Tribal people of the MM Hills in southern Karnataka, India, produce roughly 50 different types of furniture from lantana. It is considered a "near match" to the more highly-priced cane and bamboo, while being resistant to sun, rain, and termite damage.

== Species ==
The following species are recognised by The Plant List:

- Lantana achyranthifolia Desf.
- Lantana × aculeata L.
- Lantana alainii Moldenke
- Lantana amoena Ridl.
- Lantana angolensis Moldenke
- Lantana angustibracteata Hayek
- Lantana angustifolia Mill.
- Lantana aristeguietae Moldenke
- Lantana × bahamensis Britton
- Lantana balansae Briq.
- Lantana balsamifera Britton
- Lantana buchii Urb.
- Lantana caatingensis Moldenke
- Lantana camara L.
- Lantana canescens Kunth
- Lantana caracasana Turcz.
- Lantana chamissonis Benth. ex B.D.Jacks.
- Lantana chiapasensis Moldenke
- Lantana ciferriana Ekman ex Moldenke
- Lantana coimbrensis S.Moore
- Lantana colombiana López-Pal.
- Lantana cordatibracteata Moldenke
- Lantana costaricensis Hayek
- Lantana cubensis Moldenke
- Lantana cujabensis Schauer
- Lantana demutata Millsp.
- Lantana depressa Small
- Lantana dinteri Moldenke
- Lantana dwyeriana Moldenke
- Lantana ebrenbergiana Moldenke
- Lantana elenievskii I.E.Mendez
- Lantana × entrerriensis Tronc.
- Lantana exarata Urb. & Ekman
- Lantana ferreyrae Moldenke
- Lantana fiebrigii Hayek
- Lantana × flava Medik.
- Lantana × floridana Raf.
- Lantana fucata Lindl.
- Lantana glaziovii Moldenke
- Lantana gracilis T.R.S.Silva
- Lantana grisebachii Stuck. ex Seckt
- Lantana grossiserrata Moldenke
- Lantana hatoensis Moldenke
- Lantana hatschbachii Moldenke
- Lantana haughtii Moldenke
- Lantana hirsuta M.Martens & Galeotti
- Lantana hirta Graham
- Lantana hodgei R.W.Sanders
- Lantana horrida Kunth
- Lantana humuliformis Verdc.
- Lantana hypoleuca Briq.
- Lantana indica Roxb.
- Lantana insularis Moldenke
- Lantana involucrata L.
- Lantana jaliscana Moldenke
- Lantana jamaicensis Britton
- Lantana kingii Moldenke
- Lantana langlassei Moldenke
- Lantana leonardorum Moldenke
- Lantana leucocarpa Urb. & Ekman ex Moldenke
- Lantana lindmanii Briq.
- Lantana lockhardtii D.Don ex Schauer
- Lantana lopez-palacii Moldenke
- Lantana lucida Schauer
- Lantana lundiana Schauer
- Lantana machadoi R.Fern.
- Lantana magnibracteata Tronc.
- Lantana megapotamica (Spreng.) Tronc.
- Lantana melissiodorifera Perr.
- Lantana micrantha Briq.
- Lantana microcarpa Urb.
- Lantana moldenkei R.Fern.
- Lantana mollis Graham
- Lantana montevidensis (Spreng.) Briq.
- Lantana × mutabilis Weigel
- Lantana nivea Vent.
- Lantana notha Moldenke
- Lantana obtusata Briq.
- Lantana ovatifolia Britton
- Lantana parvifolia Desf.
- Lantana pastazensis Moldenke
- Lantana pauciflora Urb.
- Lantana pavonii Moldenke
- Lantana peduncularis Andersson
- Lantana petitiana A.Rich.
- Lantana planifolia (Cham.) Briq.
- Lantana pohliana Schauer
- Lantana prostrata Larrañaga
- Lantana punctulata Moldenke
- Lantana radula Sw.
- Lantana reineckii Briq.
- Lantana reptans Hayek
- Lantana reticulata Pers.
- Lantana riedeliana Schauer
- Lantana robusta Schauer
- Lantana × rubra Berland.
- Lantana rugosa Thunb.
- Lantana rugulosa Kunth
- Lantana ruiz-teranii López-Pal. & Steyerm.
- Lantana rusbyana Moldenke
- Lantana salicifolia Kunth
- Lantana salzmannii Schauer
- Lantana santosii Moldenke
- Lantana scabiosiflora Kunth
- Lantana scabrida Aiton
- Lantana scandens Moldenke
- Lantana soatensis Moldenke
- Lantana splendens Medik.
- Lantana sprucei Hayek
- Lantana × strigocamara R.W.Sanders
- Lantana strigosa (Griseb.) Urb.
- Lantana subcordata Urb.
- Lantana subtracta Hiern
- Lantana svensonii Moldenke
- Lantana swynnertonii Moldenke
- Lantana tetragona (Forssk.) Schweinf.
- Lantana tilcarensis Tronc.
- Lantana tomasii Moldenke
- Lantana trifolia L.
- Lantana ukambensis (Vatke) Verdc.
- Lantana undulata Schrank
- Lantana urticoides Hayek
- Lantana velutina M.Martens & Galeotti
- Lantana veronicifolia Hayek
- Lantana viburnoides (Forssk.) Vahl
- Lantana viscosa Pohl ex Schauer
- Lantana weberbaueri Hayek
- Lantana xenica Moldenke
- Lantana zahlbruckneri Hayek
