= Lantana rugosa =

- Flowers and leaves

Conservation status
- Least Concern (SANBI Red List)

Scientific classification
- Kingdom: Plantae
- Clade: Tracheophytes
- Clade: Angiosperms
- Clade: Eudicots
- Clade: Asterids
- Order: Lamiales
- Family: Verbenaceae
- Genus: Lantana
- Species: L. rugosa

Binomial name
- Lantana rugosa Thunb.

Species of flowering plant

Lantana rugosa, Bird's brandy, is a species of flowering plant in the verbena family (Verbenaceae), native to Southern Africa.

== Description ==
Lantana rugosa is a shrub that grows up to 1 m (3 ft 3 in) tall. It is covered with rough hairs and has purple flowers and fruit.

== Distribution and habitat ==
It occurs in Namibia, Botswana, South Africa, Eswatini and Lesotho in open woodlands, rocky koppies and grasslands.

== Gallery ==
Plant

Leaves and Flower

Fruit
