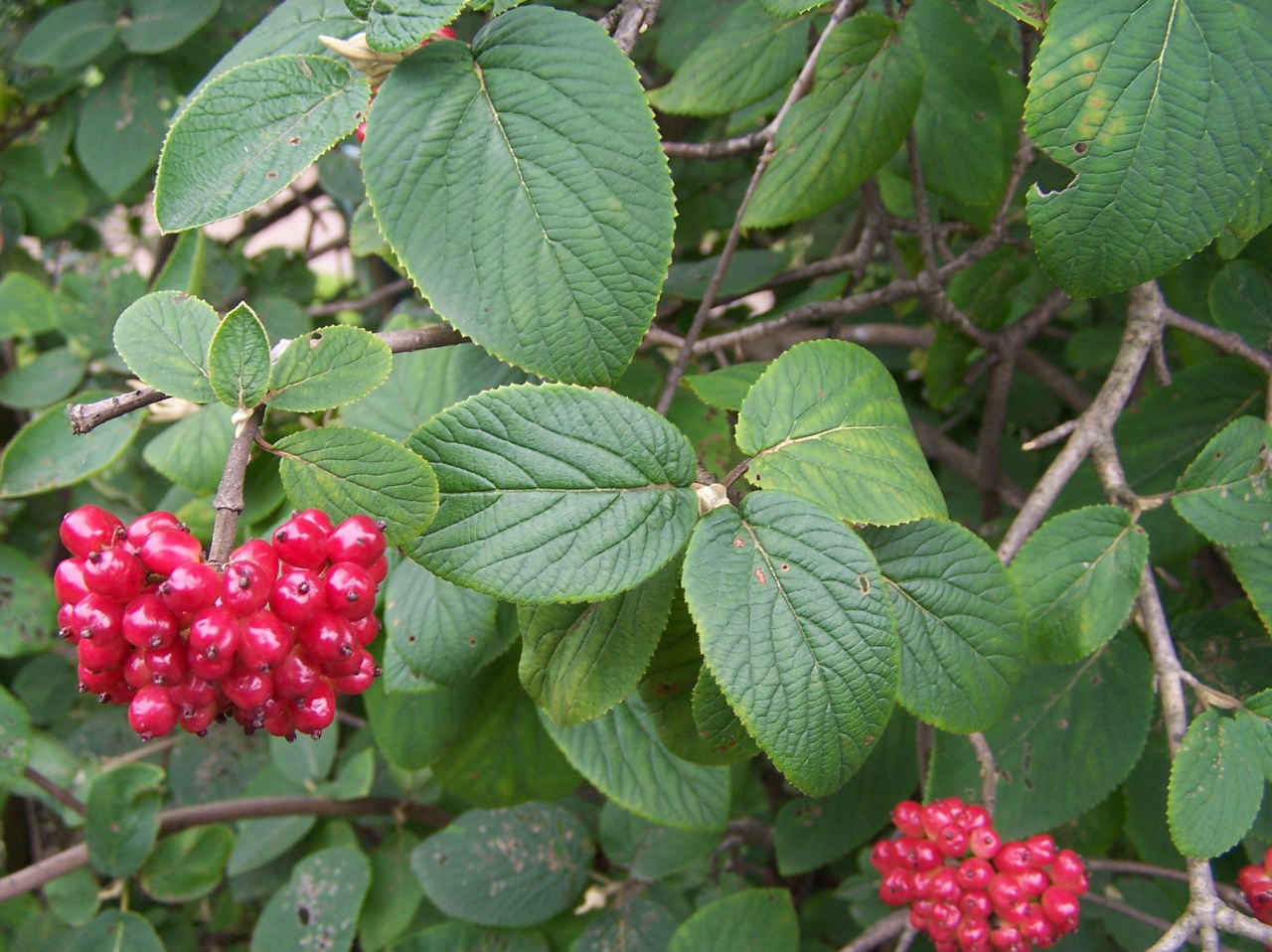
- Foliage and immature fruit

Scientific classification
- Kingdom: Plantae
- Clade: Tracheophytes
- Clade: Angiosperms
- Clade: Eudicots
- Clade: Asterids
- Order: Dipsacales
- Family: Adoxaceae
- Genus: Viburnum
- Species: V. lantana

Binomial name
- Viburnum lantana L.

Synonyms
- List: Viburnum aragonense Pau; Viburnum farinosum Stokes; Viburnum lantana var. europaeum Aiton; Viburnum maculatum Pant.; Viburnum tomentosum Lam.

= Viburnum lantana =

Species of flowering plant in the moschatel family

Viburnum lantana, the wayfarer or wayfaring tree, is a species of Viburnum, native to central, southern and western Europe (north to Yorkshire in England), northwest Africa, and southwestern Asia. The vigorous deciduous European treelike shrub is common along waysides.

== Description ==
It is a deciduous shrub or small tree growing to 4–5 m (13–16 ft) tall. The leaves are opposite, simple oval to lanceolate, 6–13 cm (2.4–5.1 in) long and 4–9 cm (1.6–3.5 in) broad, with a finely serrated margin; they are densely downy on the underside, less so on the upper surface. The hermaphrodite flowers are small, around 5 mm (0.20 in), and creamy-white, produced in dense cymes 4–10 cm (1.6–3.9 in) width at the top of the stems; they are produced in early summer, and pollinated by insects. The fruit is an oblong drupe 8 mm (0.31 in) long, green at first, turning red, then finally black at full maturity, and contains a single seed. The seeds are dispersed when birds eat the fruit, then deposit the seeds in another location in their droppings.

An older name for the plant is hoarwithy. "Hoar" means grey-haired and refers to the hairs under the leaves, and "withy" means a pliant stem.

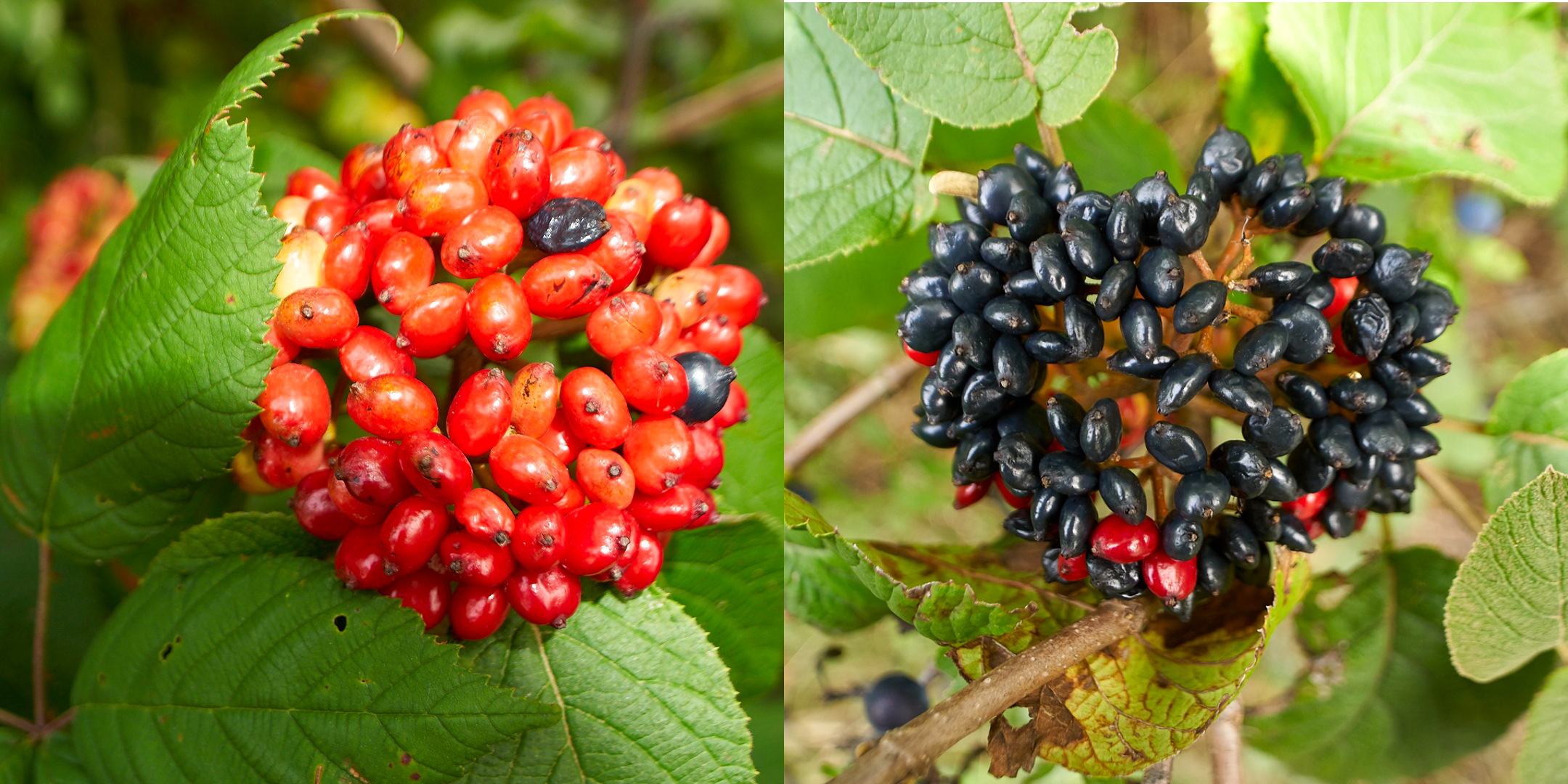
Showing simultaneous red (unripe) and black (ripe) fruits

== Cultivation and uses ==
It is commonly grown as an ornamental plant for its flowers and berries, growing best on alkaline soils. A number of cultivars have been selected, including 'Aureum', with yellow leaves in spring.

The fruit is of low to zero toxicity, but may cause vomiting or diarrhea if consumed unripe or in large quantities.
