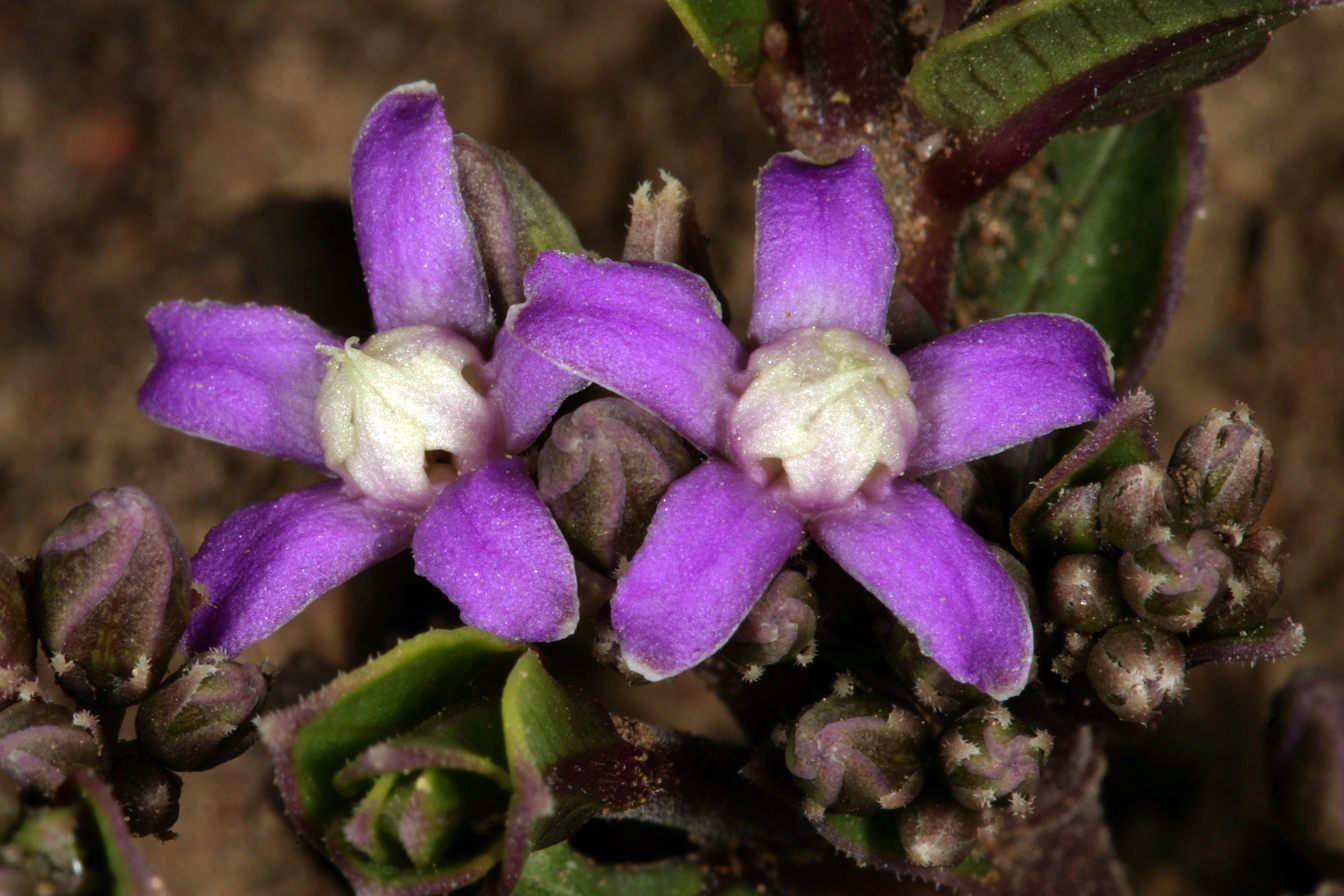
- Raphionacme hirsuta

Scientific classification
- Kingdom: Plantae
- Clade: Tracheophytes
- Clade: Angiosperms
- Clade: Eudicots
- Clade: Asterids
- Order: Gentianales
- Family: Apocynaceae
- Subfamily: Periplocoideae
- Genus: Raphionacme; Harv.

= Raphionacme =

Genus of flowering plants

Raphionacme is a plant genus in the family Apocynaceae, first described as a genus in 1842. The genus is found primarily in Africa, with one species on the Arabian Peninsula.

== Species ==
Species

1. Raphionacme angolensis (Baill.) N.E.Br. - Angola
2. Raphionacme arabica A.G.Mill. & Biagi - Oman
3. Raphionacme borenensis Venter & M.G.Gilbert - Ethiopia
4. Raphionacme brownii Scott-Elliot - W Africa
5. Raphionacme caerulea E.A.Bruce - Sierra Leone
6. Raphionacme chimanimaniana Venter & R.L.Verh. - Zimbabwe
7. Raphionacme dyeri Retief & Venter - Free State in South Africa
8. Raphionacme elsana Venter & R.L.Verh. - KwaZulu-Natal
9. Raphionacme flanaganii Schltr. - KwaZulu-Natal
10. Raphionacme galpinii Schltr. - Eswatini, South Africa
11. Raphionacme globosa K.Schum. - Malawi, Tanzania
12. Raphionacme grandiflora N.E.Br. - Malawi, Tanzania, Zambia
13. Raphionacme haeneliae Venter & R.L.Verh. - Namibia
14. Raphionacme hirsuta (E.Mey.) R.A.Dyer - Eastern Cape Province
15. Raphionacme inconspicua H.Huber - Damaraland in Namibia
16. Raphionacme keayi Bullock - Nigeria, Cameroon
17. Raphionacme lanceolata Schinz - Tanzania, Namibia
18. Raphionacme linearis K.Schum. - Zaire, Angola
19. Raphionacme longifolia N.E.Br. - Zambia
20. Raphionacme longituba E.A.Bruce - Tanzania, Zambia
21. Raphionacme lucens Venter & R.L.Verh. - KwaZulu-Natal, Mozambique
22. Raphionacme madiensis S.Moore - Tanzania, Zimbabwe
23. Raphionacme michelii De Wild. - Zaire
24. Raphionacme moyalica Venter & R.L.Verh. - N Kenya, S Ethiopia
25. Raphionacme namibiana Venter & R.L.Verh. - Namibia
26. Raphionacme palustris Venter & R.L.Verh. - KwaZulu-Natal
27. Raphionacme procumbens Schltr. - KwaZulu-Natal, Eswatini, Zimbabwe
28. Raphionacme pulchella Venter & R.L.Verh. - Mozambique, Zimbabwe
29. Raphionacme splendens Schltr. - Tanzania, Uganda
30. Raphionacme sylvicola Venter & R.L.Verh. - Zambia
31. Raphionacme utilis N.E.Br. & Stapf - tropical Africa
32. Raphionacme velutina Schltr. - Zimbabwe, Limpopo
33. Raphionacme vignei E.A.Bruce - Ghana
34. Raphionacme villicorona Venter
35. Raphionacme welwitschii Schltr. & Rendle - - Malawi, Tanzania, Zambia, Mozambique
36. Raphionacme zeyheri Harv. - South Africa

formerly included

transferred to other genera (Buckollia, Chlorocyathus, Schlechterella )

1. R. abyssinica now Schlechterella abyssinica
2. R. loandae now Chlorocyathus monteiroae
3. R. lobulata now Chlorocyathus lobulata
4. R. monteiroae now Chlorocyathus monteiroae
5. R. volubilis now Buckollia volubilis

== Gallery ==
=== Flowers ===
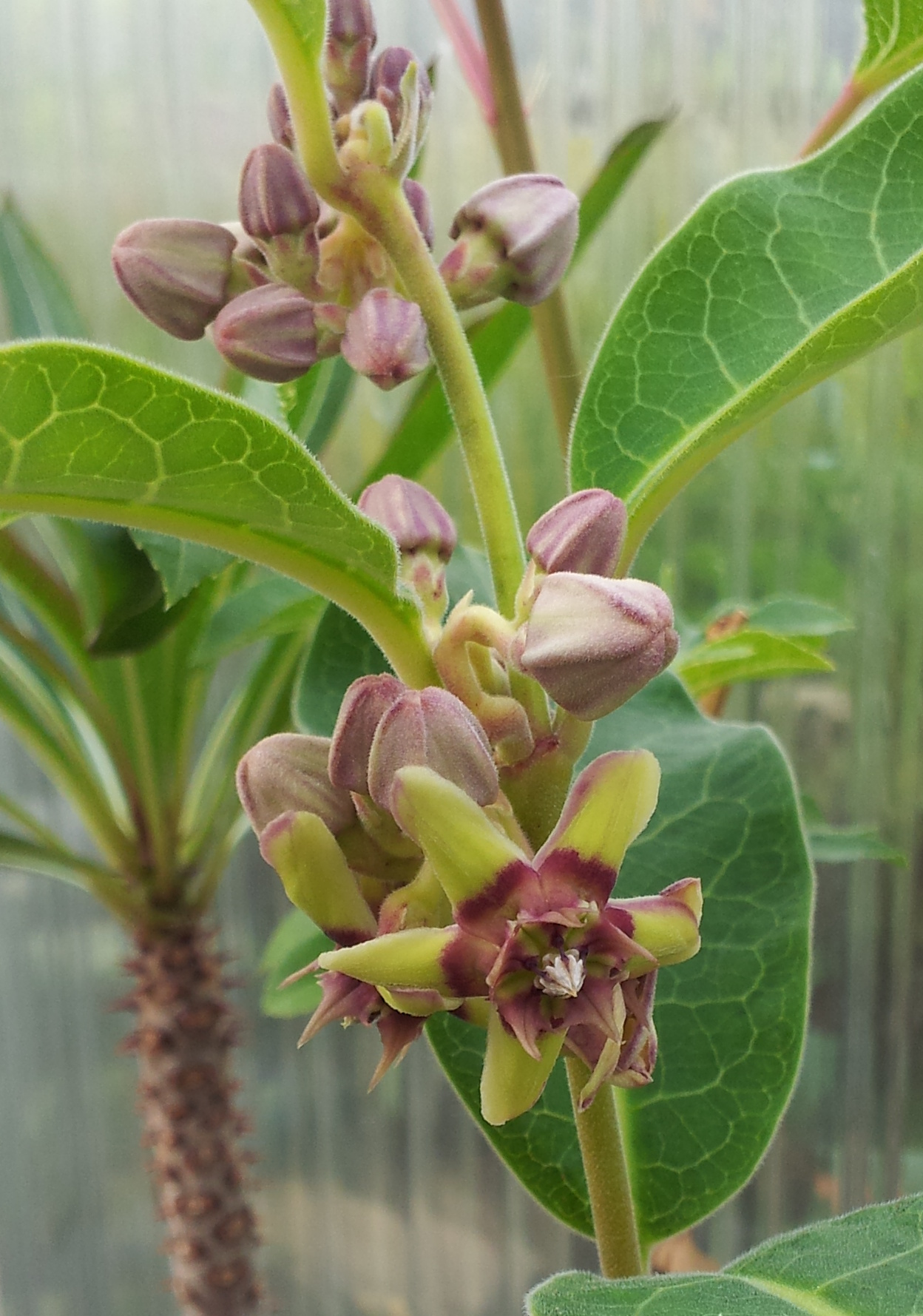
Raphionacme angolensis

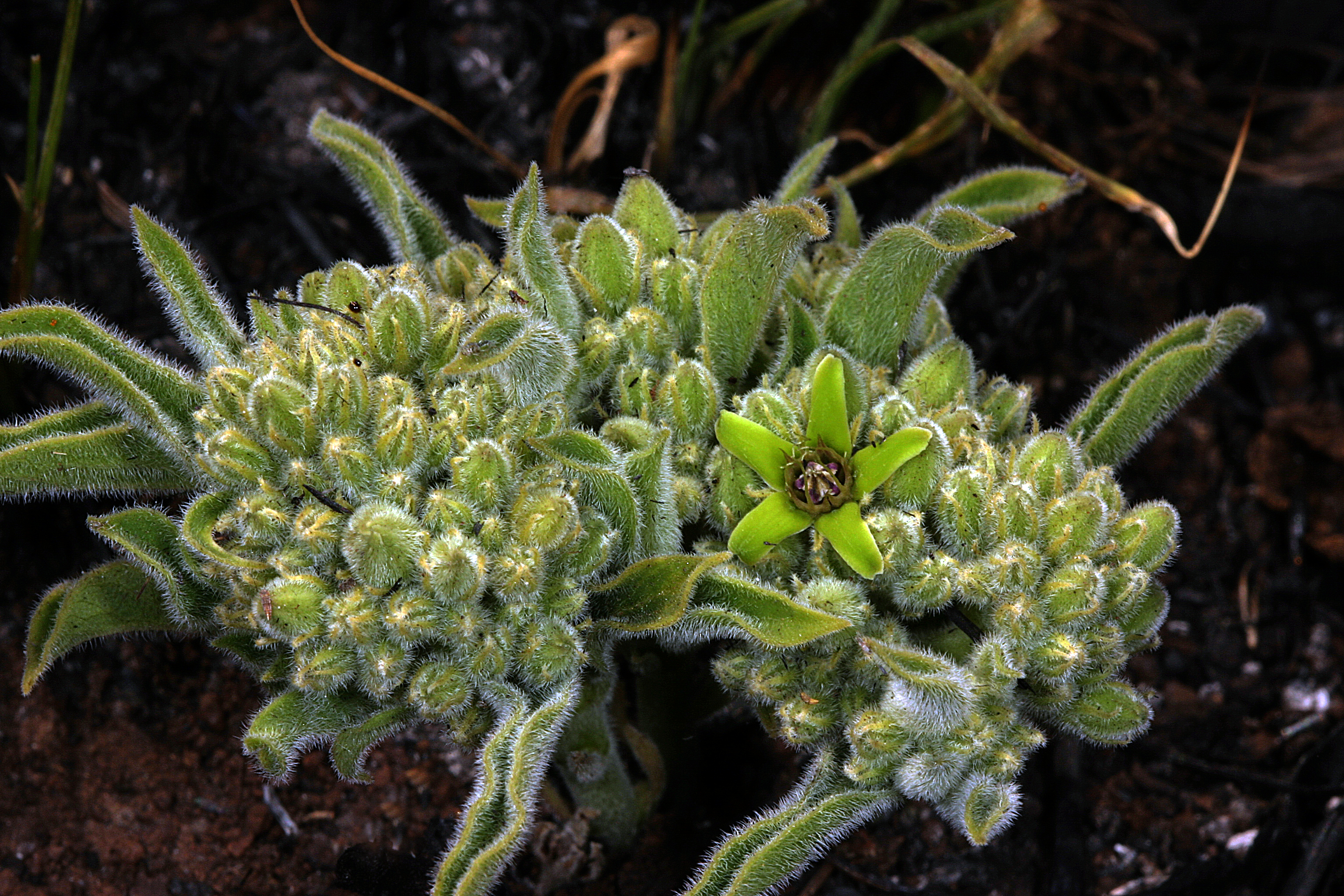
Raphionacme galpinii in bud

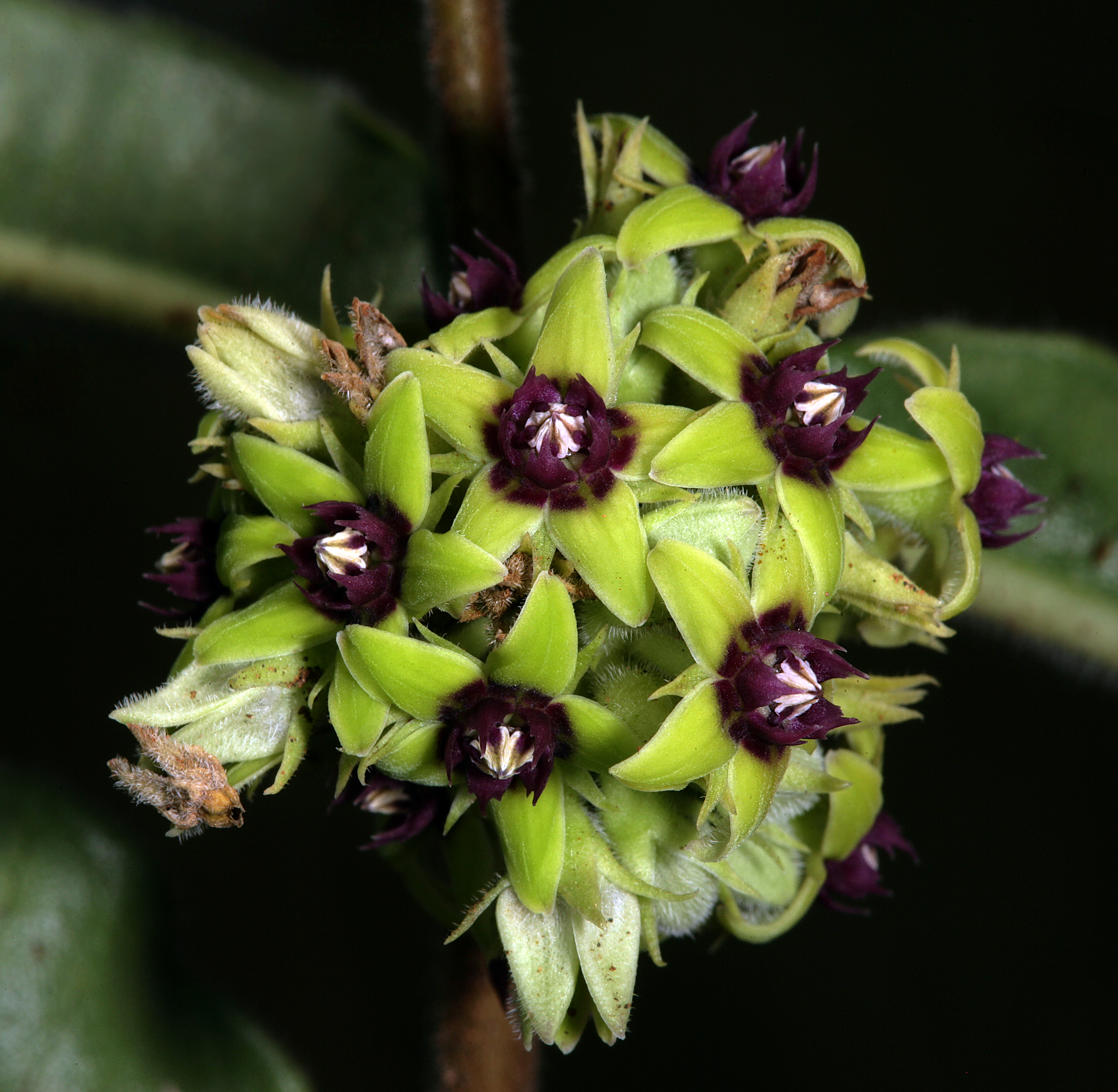
Raphionacme galpinii in bloom

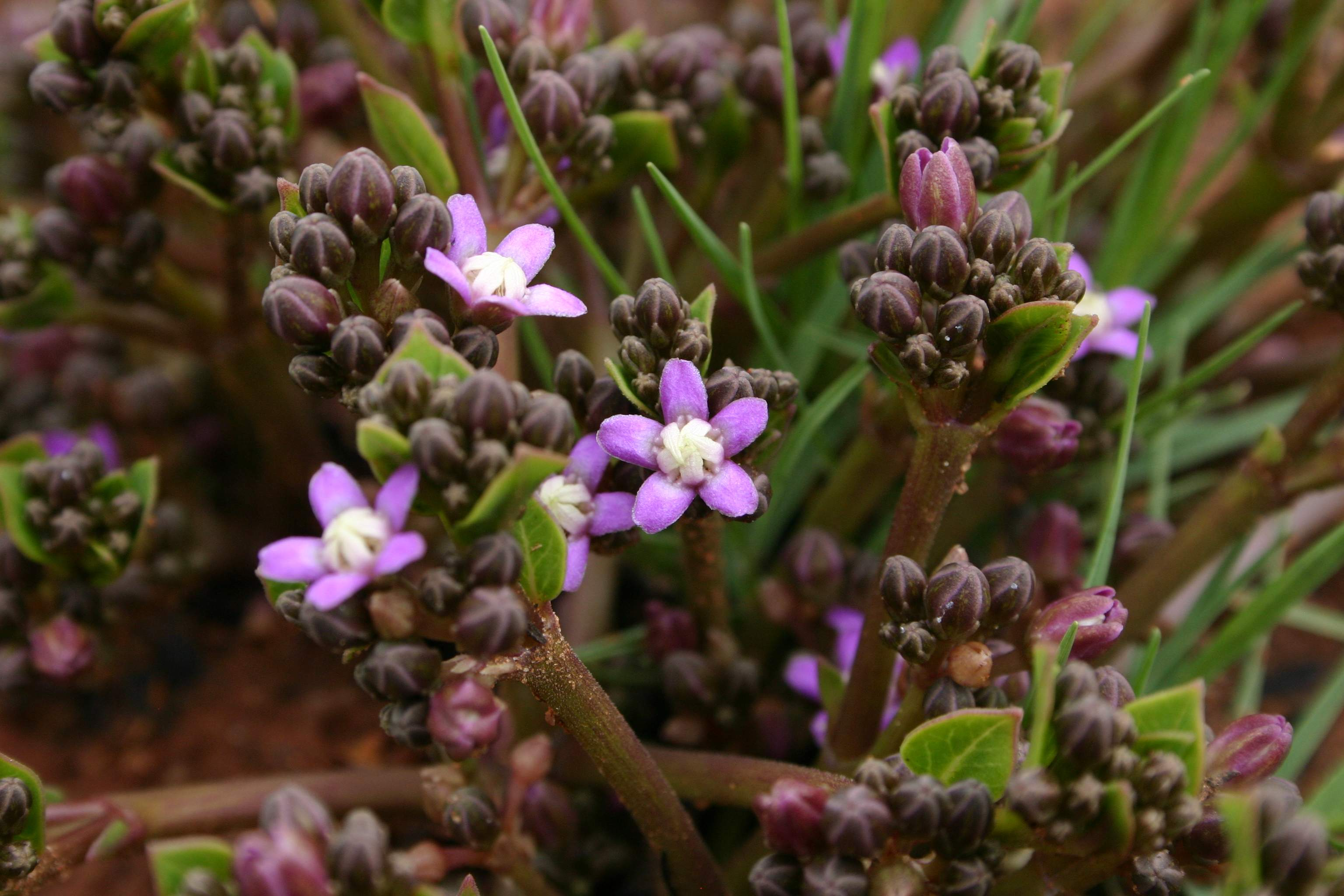
Raphionacme hirsuta

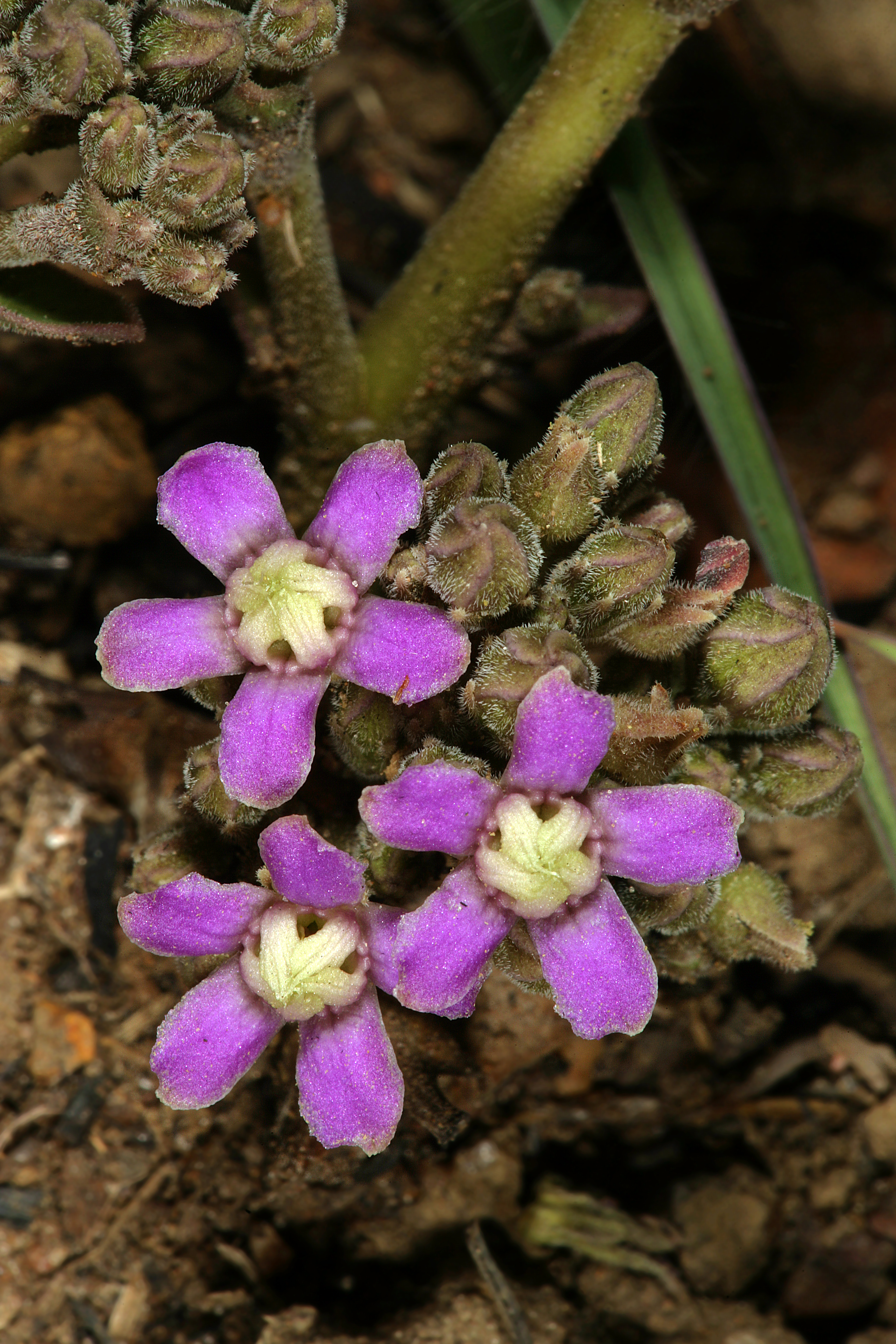
Raphionacme hirsuta

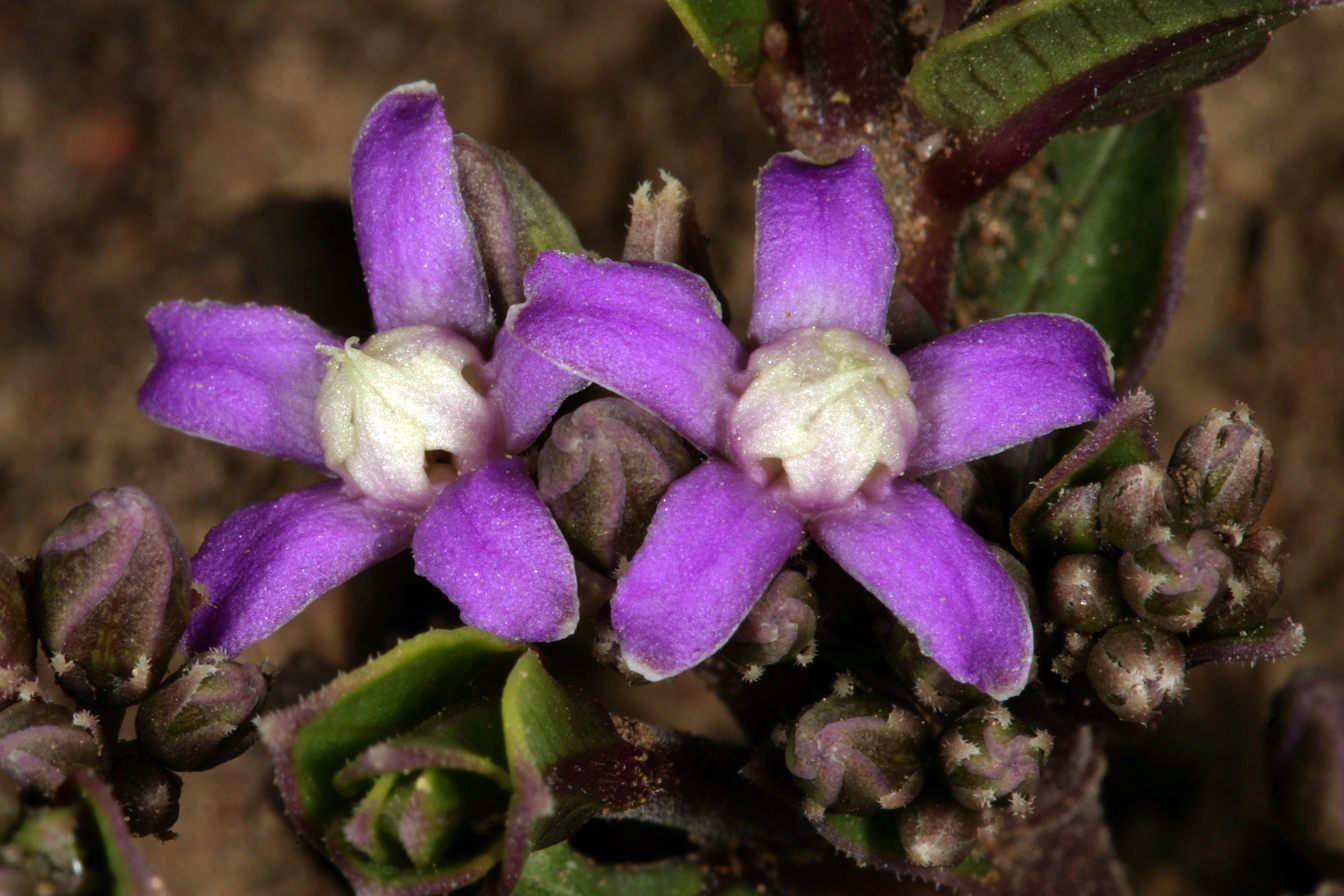
Raphionacme hirsuta

=== Fruits ===
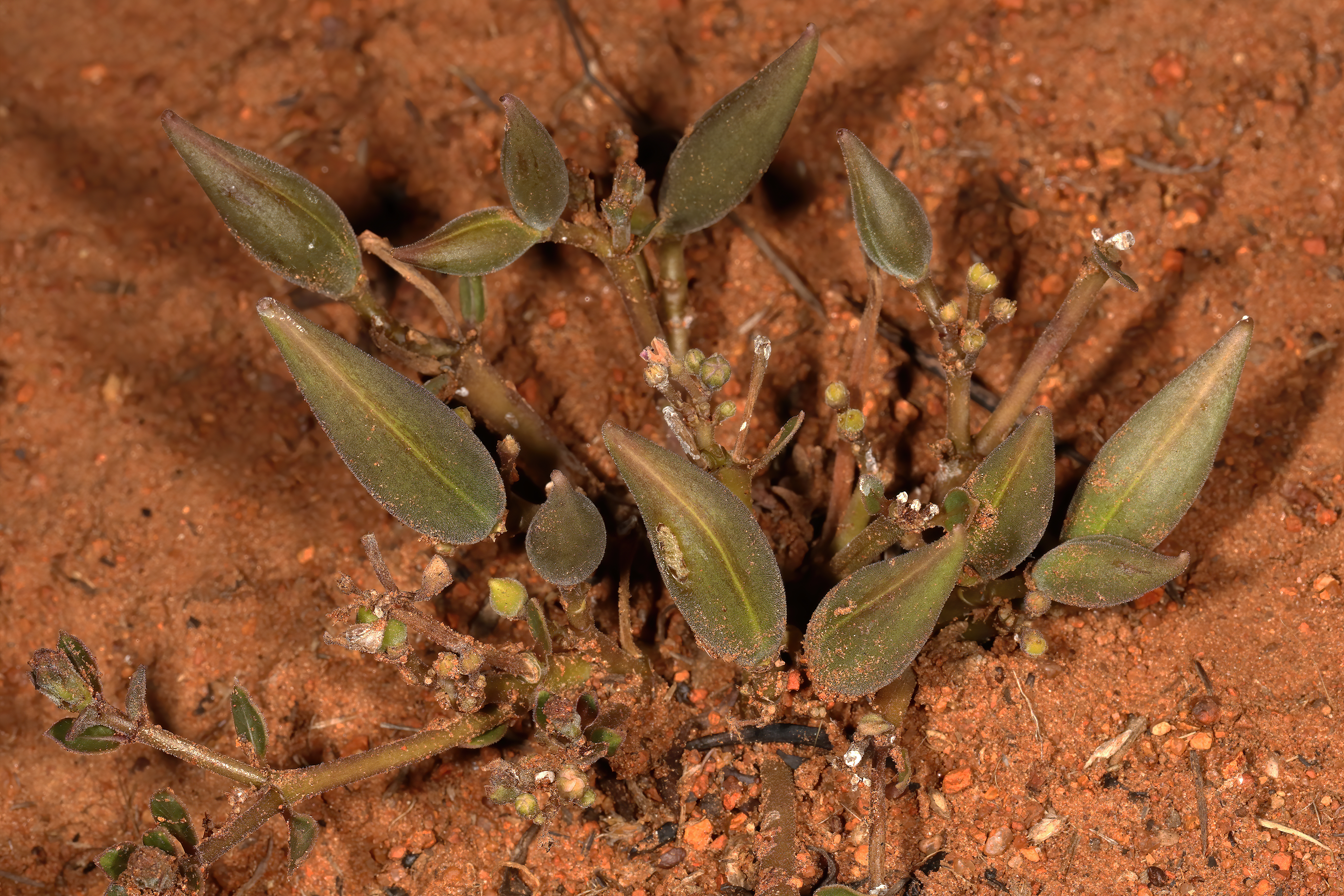
Raphionacme hirsuta

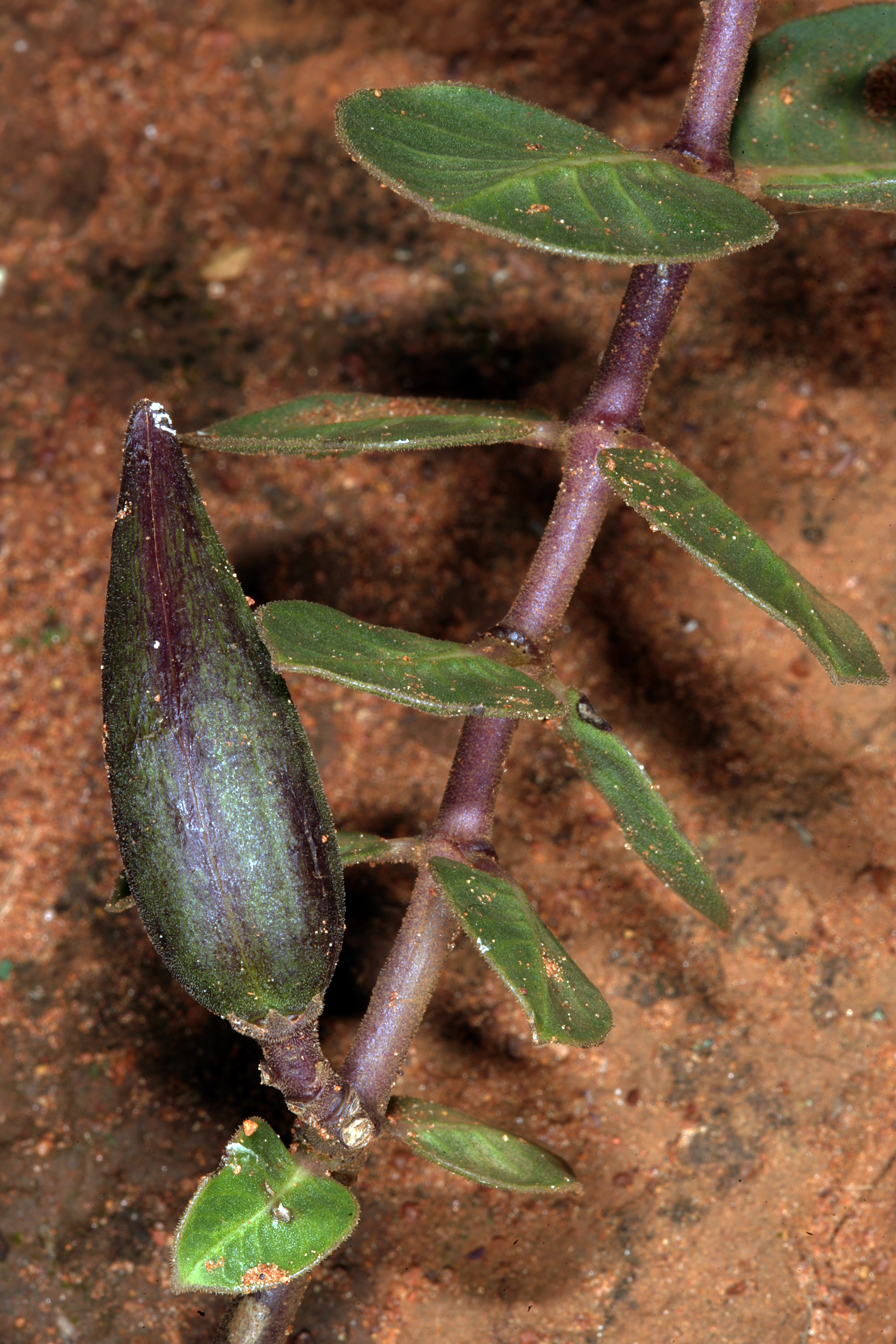
Raphionacme hirsuta single fruit

=== Caudex/tuber ===
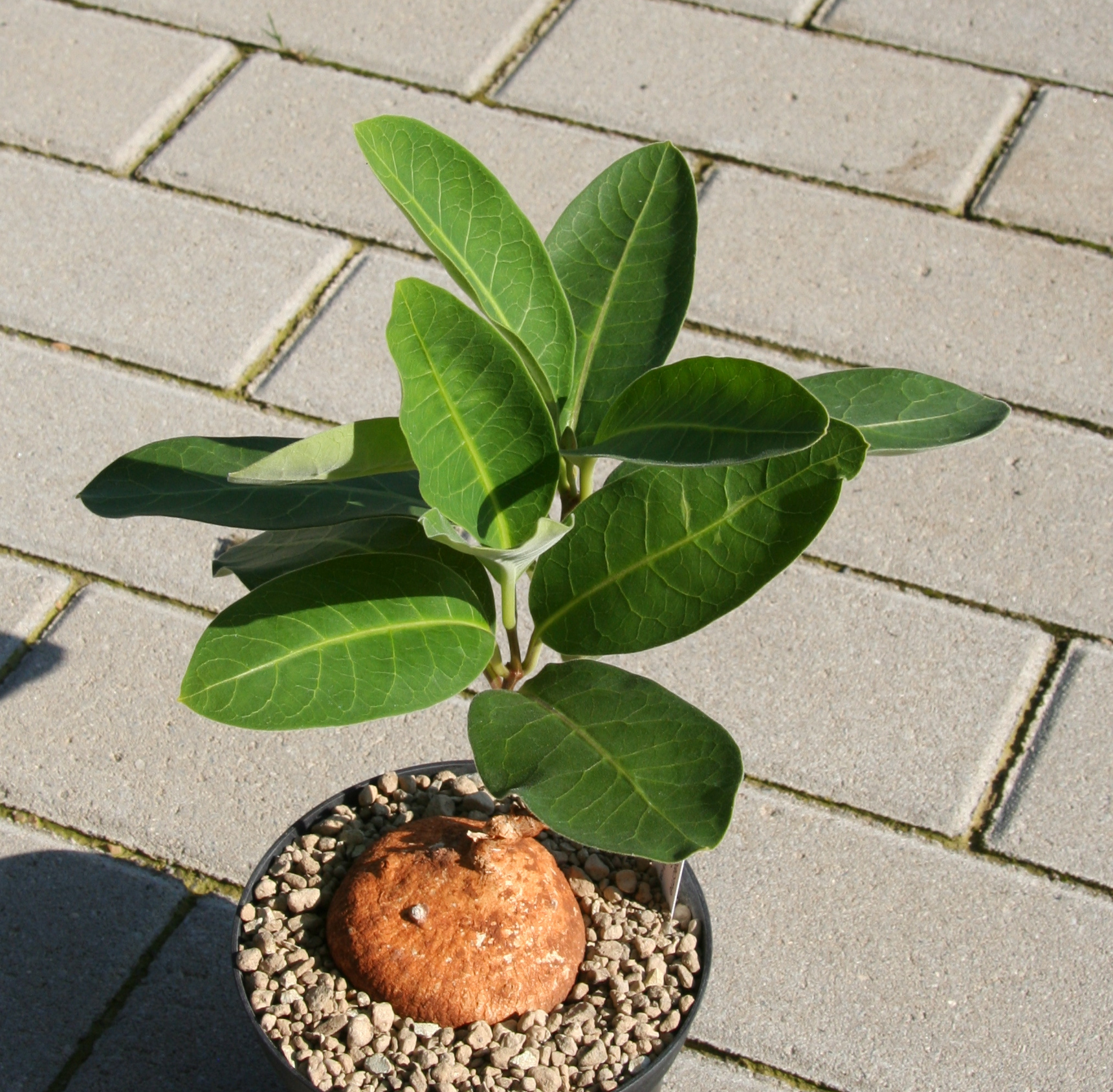
Raphionacme angolensis

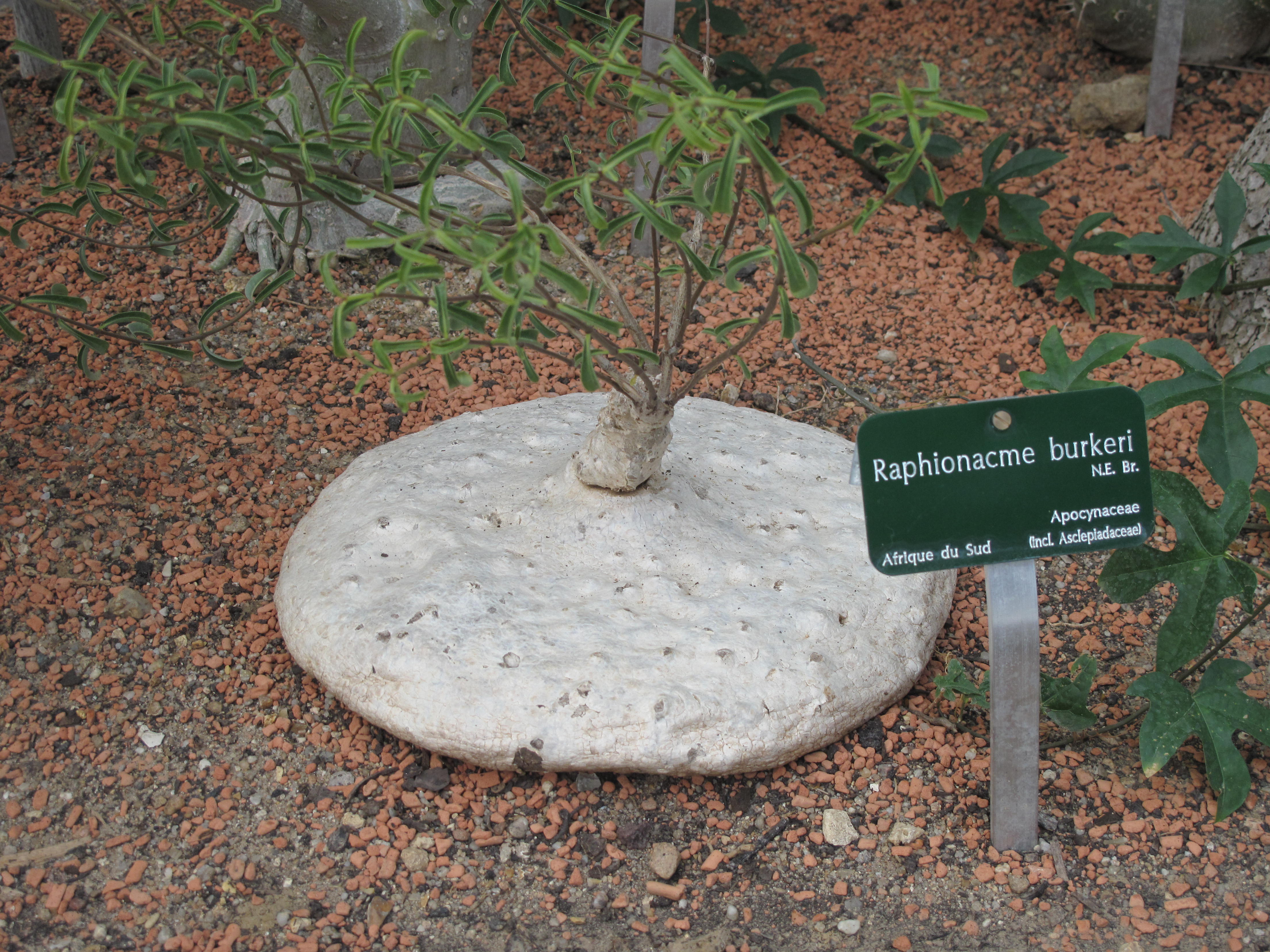
Raphionacme burkeri

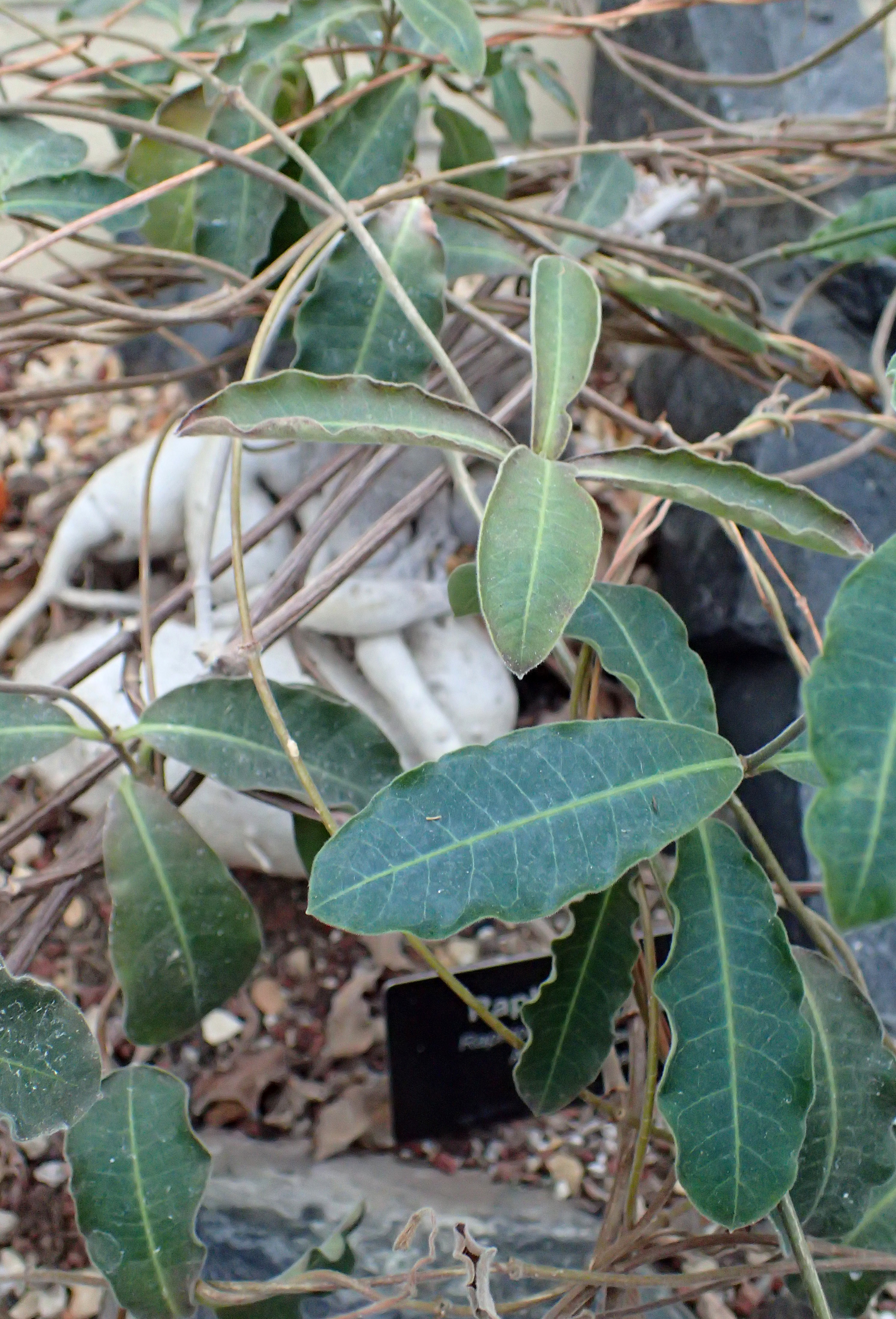
Raphionacme flanaganii

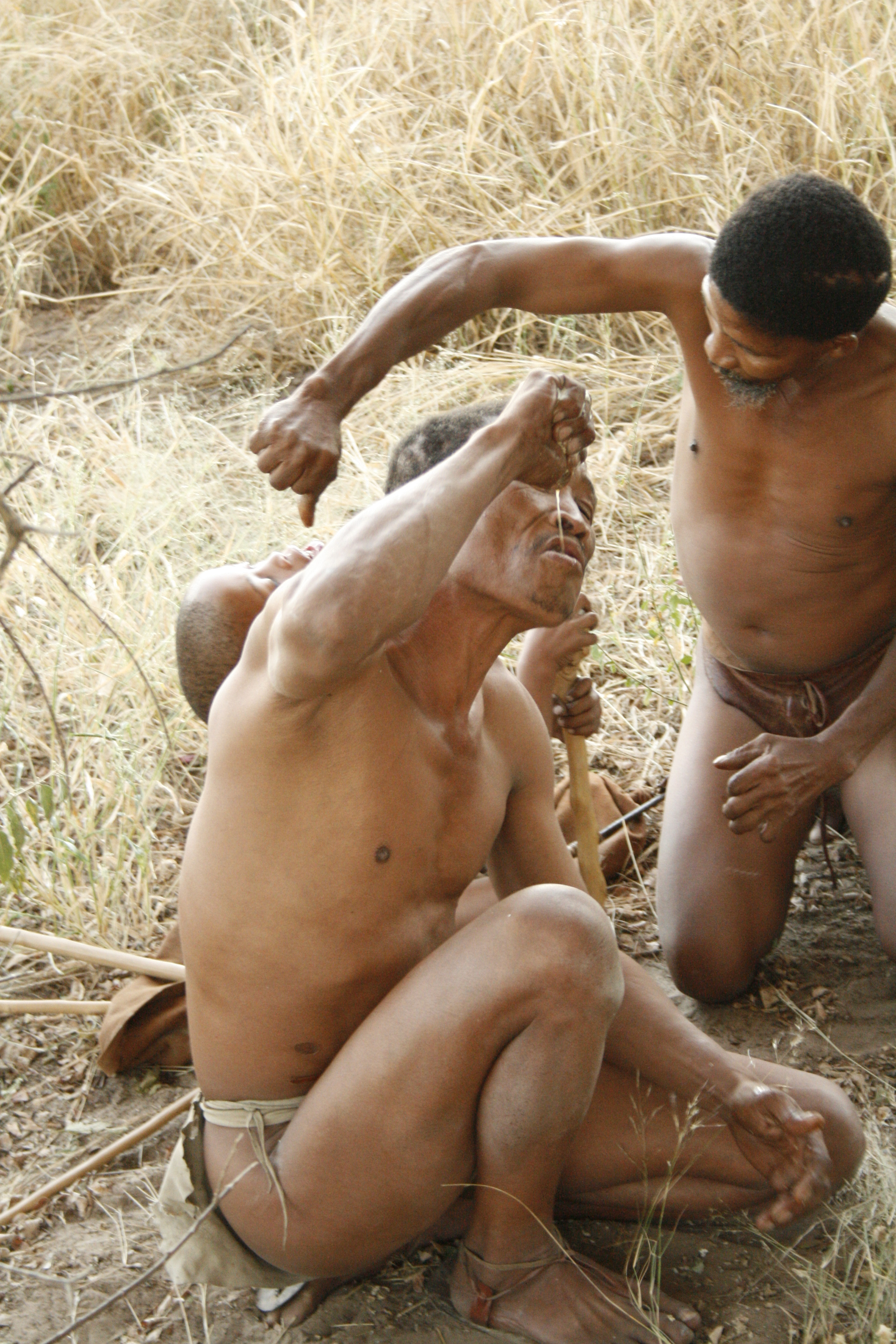
Khoisan man drinking stored water from caudex of bi (Raphionacme velutina)
