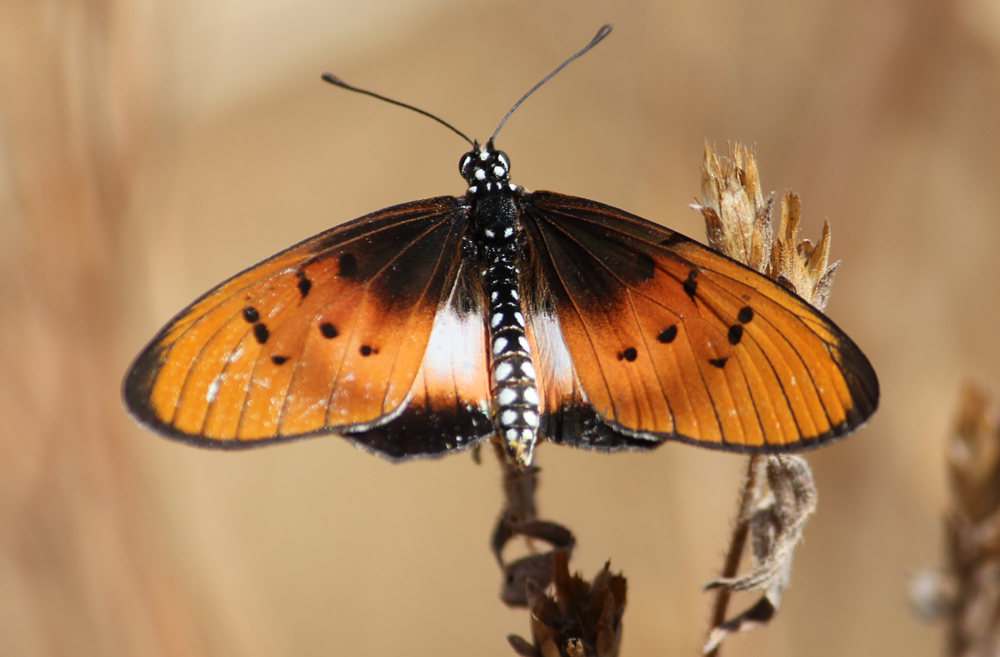
- In Soutpansberg, South Africa

Conservation status
- Least Concern (IUCN 3.1)

Scientific classification
- Kingdom: Animalia
- Phylum: Arthropoda
- Class: Insecta
- Order: Lepidoptera
- Family: Nymphalidae
- Genus: Acraea
- Species: A. lygus

Binomial name
- Acraea lygus H. Druce, 1875

= Acraea lygus =

Lygus acraea

Species of butterfly

Acraea lygus, the lygus acraea, is a butterfly of the family Nymphalidae. The species was first described by Herbert Druce in 1875 from specimens collected by Joachim John Monteiro . It is found in south-west Africa, Botswana, Kenya, Zambia. In South Africa it is found from the savannah in Northern Cape to the Limpopo Province and the north-west provinces. It is an occasional migrant to Mpumalanga.

== Description ==
Very close to Acraea stenobea q.v. The wingspan is 48–55 mm for males and 50–56 mm for females.

== Biology ==
Adults are on wing year round, but mainly from September to June.

== Taxonomy ==
It is a member of the Acraea caecilia species group. See also Pierre & Bernaud, 2014
