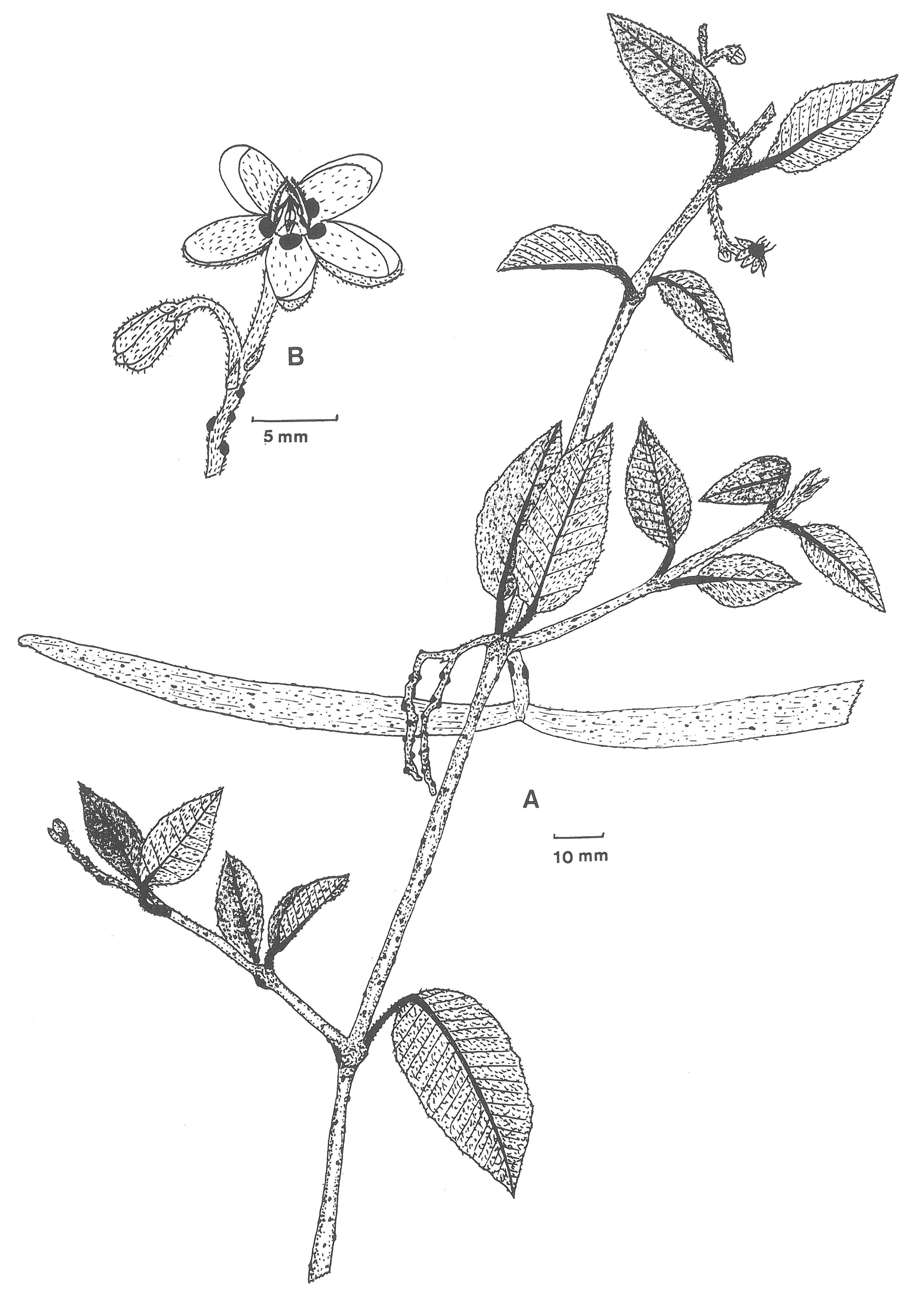
- Botanical illustration of Buckollia tomentosa

Scientific classification
- Kingdom: Plantae
- Clade: Tracheophytes
- Clade: Angiosperms
- Clade: Eudicots
- Clade: Asterids
- Order: Gentianales
- Family: Apocynaceae
- Genus: Buckollia
- Species: B. tomentosa

Binomial name
- Buckollia tomentosa (E.A.Bruce) Venter & R.L.Verh.

Synonyms
- Tacazzea tomentosa E.A.Bruce

= Buckollia tomentosa =

Species of flowering plant

Buckollia tomentosa is a species of plant in the Apocynaceae family. It is native to the Ethiopia, Sudan, and Uganda. Eileen Adelaide Bruce, the botanist who first formally described the species, named it after the dense covering of wooly hairs (tomentosus in Latin) on its flowers.

== Description ==
It is a woody climbing plant. Its brown, warty stems and branches are densely covered in wooly hairs when young. The egg-shaped leaves are 25–45 by 9–20 millimeters. The leaves occur opposite one another on the stem. The upper surfaces of the leaves are dark green and slightly hairy. The undersides of the leaves are densely covered in white wooly hairs except at the midrib where the hairs are rust-colored. The tips of the leaves are pointed or taper to a point, the bases are blunt, and the margins are wavy. Its petioles are 7–15 millimeters long and densely covered in rust-colored wooly hairs. Its Inflorescences slightly to densely covered in wooly hairs with peduncles that are 7–10 millimeters long, and pedicels that are 4–5 millimeters long. The pedicels have oval bracts that are 1–2 millimeters long. The bracts have tapering tips. Its flowers have 5 triangular to egg-shaped sepals that are 1.5–2 by 1 millimeters, densely covered in white wooly hairs on their outer surface, and have pointed tips. Its 5 petals are fused at the base forming 0.5 millimeter long tube. The oblong to egg-shaped, green to cream-colored lobes of the petals are 5–6 by 3 millimeters. The petals are densely covered in wooly hairs on their outer surface and have sparse hairs on their inner surface. The tips of the petals are blunt and the margins are wavy. The petals have violet-brown glandular swellings at their base. The flowers have a structure between the petals and the stamens called a corona. Its sparsely hairy corona has thread-like lobes that are 5–6 millimeters long and radially aligned with the sepals. The flowers have 5 stamen with anthers that are 1–1.5 by 0.8 millimeters and filaments that are 1 millimeters long. The pistils have negligible styles bi-lobed stigma that are 1.5 millimeters long. Each stigma lobe bears a structure called a pollen carrier. The oval pollen carriers have bases that are divided into three parts and covered in a sticky surface. The brown fruits are covered in sparse warty protrusions and are 13–17.5 by 9 centimeters.

=== Reproductive biology ===
The pollen of Batesanthus purpureus is shed as permanent tetrads.

=== Distribution and habitat ===
It has been observed growing in semi-arid scrubland at elevations of 1400 to 1800 meters.
