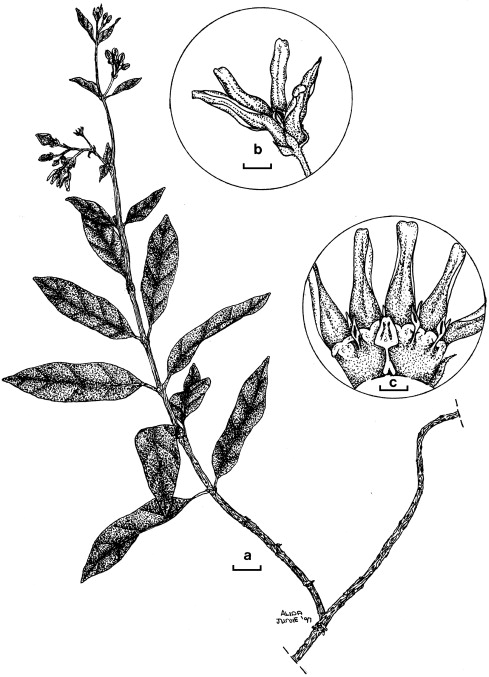
- Botanical illustration of Chlorocyathus monteiroae.

Scientific classification
- Kingdom: Plantae
- Clade: Tracheophytes
- Clade: Angiosperms
- Clade: Eudicots
- Clade: Asterids
- Order: Gentianales
- Family: Apocynaceae
- Genus: Chlorocyathus
- Species: C. monteiroae

Binomial name
- Chlorocyathus monteiroae Oliv.

Synonyms
- Raphionacme monteiroae (Oliv.) N.E.Br.; Raphionacme loandae Schltr. & Rendle

= Chlorocyathus monteiroae =

Species of flowering plant

Chlorocyathus monteiroae is a species of plant in the Apocynaceae family. It is native to Angola, Kenya, Mozambique, Namibia, South Africa, Tanzania and Zimbabwe. Daniel Oliver, the botanist who first formally described the species named it after Rose Monteiro who collected the specimen he examined from Maputo Bay (then known as Delagoa Bay).

== Description ==
It is a woody climbing plant. Its roots have rounded to cylindrical tubers that are 10–30 by 3–7 centimeters. The tubers exude a white latex when cut. Its slender, branching stems are up to 8 meters long are covered in soft hairs. Its leaves are positioned opposite one another on the stems. Its fleshy, egg-shaped to elliptical leaves are 10–60 by 5–30 millimeters and covered both surfaces in soft hairs. The leaves are dark green above and pale green below. The tips of the leaves are pointed to blunt and the bases are wedge-shaped to blunt. Its petioles are 1–10 millimeters long. Adjacent petioles have ridges between them on the stem that sometimes have secretory colleters. Its softly-haired inflorescences have 1–5 flowers. The inflorescences have peduncles that are 5–20 millimeters long. Each flower is on a pedicel that is 2–10 millimeters long. The pedicels have egg-shaped bracts that are 1–3 millimeters long. Its flowers have 5 egg-shaped sepals that are 2–4 by 1–2 millimeters with pointed tips. The undersides of the sepals are covered in soft hairs. Its 5 bright to light green petals are fused at the base forming a ribbed, cylindrical to bell-shaped, 4–6 millimeter-long tube. The egg-shaped petal lobes are 6–12 by 3–5 millimeters with tips that are pointed to blunt and margins that are folded back. The petals are covered in soft hairs on their outer surface. The flowers have a ring-like structure between the petals and its stamen called a corona. The foot of the corona is fused to the base of petal lobes. Its corona has 5 fleshy, pink to purple, lobes that are about 1 millimeter long. Between the lobes are cream-colored to white, thread-like projections that are 2–3 millimeters long. The flowers have 5 stamen with filaments that are 1–2 millimeters long egg-shaped anthers that are 2–3 millimeter long with tapering tips. The anthers are fused to the stigma. Its flowers have 5 nectaries around the base of the style. The flowers have 2 ovaries that are about 1 millimeter long. The flowers have slender, cylindrical styles that are 2–3 millimeters long with a blunt stigma. Its fruit occur in pairs positioned pointing away from one another horizontally. The very narrow, oval fruit are 7–11 by 0.7 centimeters with tapering tips. Its egg-shaped to diamond-shaped seeds are 7 millimeters long. The seeds are tufted with white hairs that are 2.5–3 centimeters long.

=== Reproductive biology ===
The pollen of Chlorocyathus lobulata is shed as permanent tetrads.

=== Distribution and habitat ===
It has been observed growing dry savanna in sandy, or loamy or clay-loam soils at elevations up to 1700 meters.
