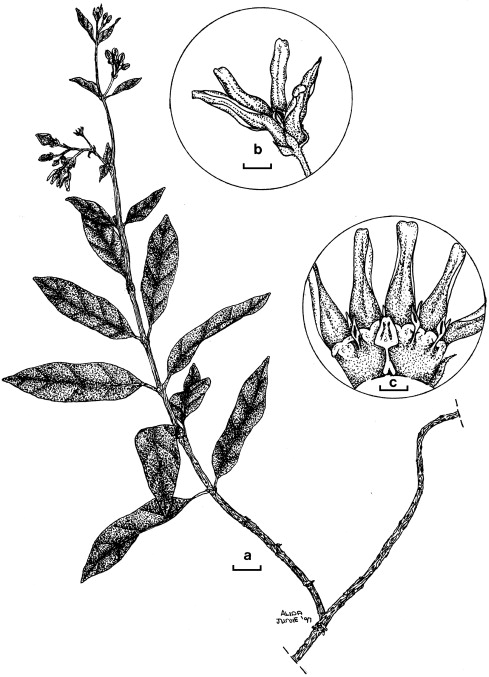
- Chlorocyathus monteiroae

Scientific classification
- Kingdom: Plantae
- Clade: Tracheophytes
- Clade: Angiosperms
- Clade: Eudicots
- Clade: Asterids
- Order: Gentianales
- Family: Apocynaceae
- Subfamily: Periplocoideae
- Genus: Chlorocyathus; Oliv.

Type species
- Chlorocyathus monteiroae Oliv.

Synonyms
- Kappia Venter, A.P.Dold & R.L.Verh.

= Chlorocyathus =

Genus of plants

Chlorocyathus is a genus of plants in the Apocynaceae, first described in 1887. It is native to southern Africa.

Species

1. Chlorocyathus lobulata (Venter & R.L.Verh.) Venter - Bathurst District in Cape Province of South Africa
2. Chlorocyathus monteiroae Oliv. - Maputo Bay (formerly Delagoa Bay) in southern Mozambique

formerly included

moved to Raphionacme

- Chlorocyathus welwitschii (Schltr. & Rendle) Bullock, synonym of Raphionacme welwitschii Schltr. & Rendle
