= Rose Monteiro =

South African naturalist, writer, scientific illustrator and collector

- Born: 1840
- Died: 11 February 1898
- Occupations: Naturalist, botanical collector, writer, scientific illustrator, botanist, scientific collector
- Spouse: Joachim John Monteiro

Rose Monteiro (née Bassett) (1 May 1840 – 11 February 1898) was a late-19th-century plant collector and naturalist who spent several years in Lourenço Marques on Delagoa Bay, Mozambique.

Monteiro was born in London. She married Joachim John Monteiro, a British mining engineer and naturalist. They spent several years in Angola, where her husband worked as a mining engineer and naturalist. Then, in 1876, they relocated to Lourenco Marques, where her husband worked as a labor recruitment agent for the Cape Colony until his untimely death in 1878.

== Work ==
Monteiro published 'Delagoa Bay: its natives and natural history' in 1891, where she describes the wide range of flora from the region. One species she describes was a succulent of the aloe family, with very thick, mottled leaves and heads of pale pink flowers. Monteiro sent samples to Kew Gardens in 1886, where it was cultivated and flowered in 1889. This species was then named after her, Aloe Monteiroæ.

Monteiro also collected butterflies, which she shared with other collectors, many of which were featured in the book 'South-African butterflies'. She also contributed scientific illustrations of butterflies to the book 'Rhopalocera exotica; being illustrations of new, rare, and unfigured species of butterflies'.
