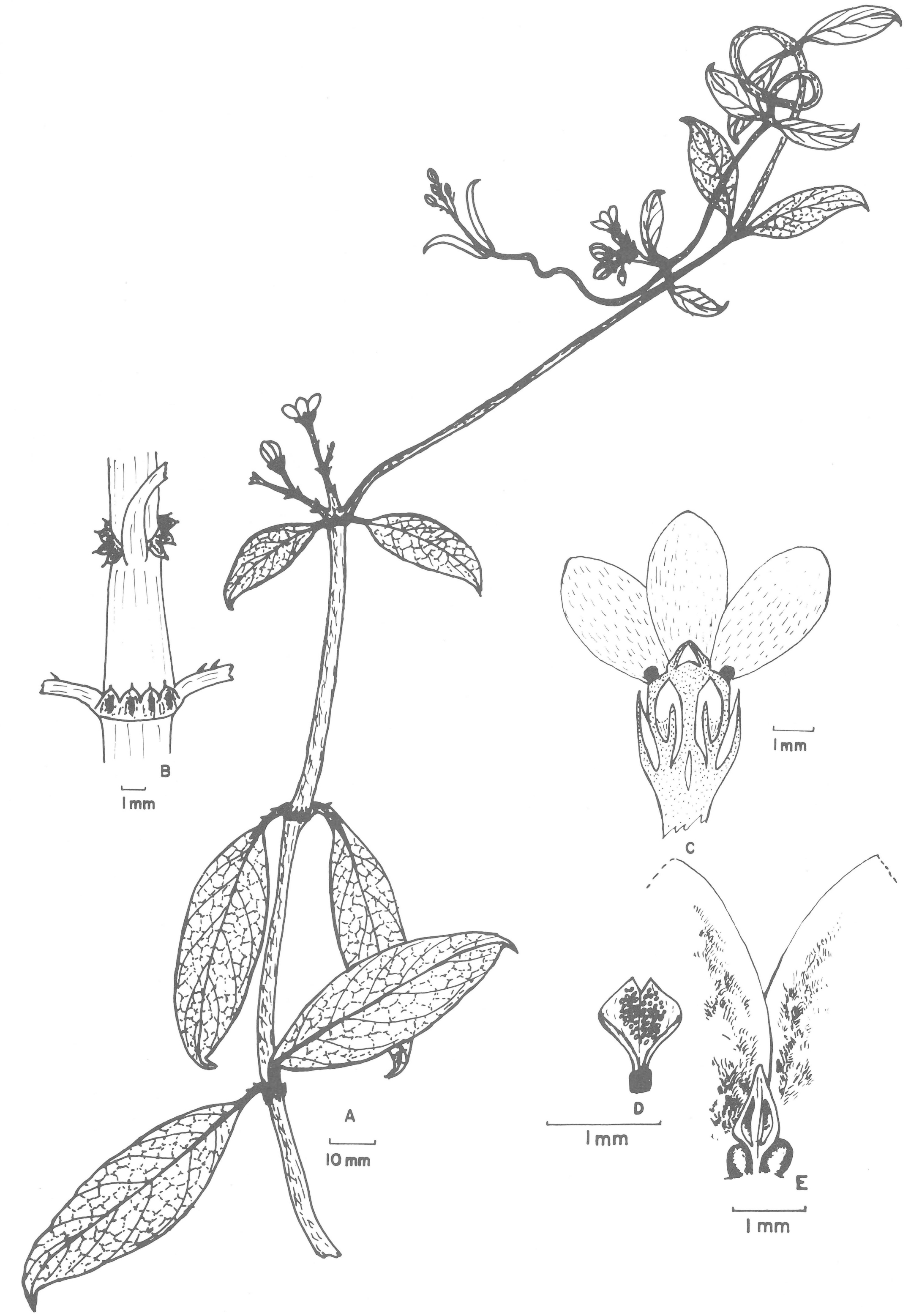
- Botanical illustration of Chlorocyathus lobulata published using the synonymous name Raphionacme lobulata.

Scientific classification
- Kingdom: Plantae
- Clade: Tracheophytes
- Clade: Angiosperms
- Clade: Eudicots
- Clade: Asterids
- Order: Gentianales
- Family: Apocynaceae
- Genus: Chlorocyathus
- Species: C. lobulata

Binomial name
- Chlorocyathus lobulata (Venter & R.L.Verh.) Venter

Synonyms
- Kappia lobulate (Venter & R.L.Verh.) Venter, A.P.Dold & R.L.Verh.; Raphionacme lobulate Venter & R.L.Verh.

= Chlorocyathus lobulata =

Species of flowering plant

Chlorocyathus lobulata is a species of plant in the Apocynaceae family. It is native to the Cape Provinces of South Africa. Hendrik J. T. Venter and Rudolf L. Verhoeven, the botanists who first formally described the species named it, using the synonym Raphionacme lobulata, after the distinctive lobes of the corona of its flowers.

== Description ==
It is a woody climbing plant. It has slender roots with succulent tubers that are 5–20 centimeters in diameter. The tubers are grey outside, white inside and exude a white latex when cut. Its slender, hairless stems are up to 12 meters long and pale mauve to red when young but turn grey when older. Its leaves are positioned opposite one another on the stems. Its hairless, egg-shaped to elliptical leaves are 6–7 by 2–3.5 centimeters. The upper surface of the leaves are glossy and dark green and the margins are rolled downward. The undersides of the leaves are pale green. The tips of the leaves are pointed or gradually narrowing to a point and curved back. The base of the leaves is rounded to blunt. Its petioles are 8–10 millimeters long. The petioles have a groove with red hairs. Its hairless inflorescences have up to 10 flowers. The inflorescences have peduncles that are 5–15 millimeters long. Each flower is on a pedicel that is 4–5 millimeters long. The pedicels have triangular bracts fringed with hairs. Its flowers have 5 triangular sepals that are 2–3 by 2 millimeters with pointed tips and margins that are fringed with hairs. Its 5 green petals are fused at the base forming a 2 millimeter long tube with triangular to egg-shaped lobes that are 4 by 2 millimeters. The tips of the petals are blunt. The lobes of the petals are hairless on the outside and have coarse white hairs on the inside. The flowers have a ring-like structure between the petals and its stamen called a corona. The foot of the corona is fused to the base of petal lobes. Its corona has 5 yellow, fleshy, columnar lobes that are shaped like a broad, inverted heart and are 0.5–1 by 2 millimeters. The lobes of the corona alternate with the petals and are topped with minute coarse hairs. The flowers have 5 stamen that have 0.5 millimeters-long filaments that are fused to the inner base of the corona lobes. The stamen have angular egg-shaped anthers that are 1 millimeter long and fused to the stigma. Its flowers have 5 erect, star-shaped nectaries that alternate with the stamen. The nectaries have nectar pouches at their base fused with the base of corona lobes. The flowers have 2 ovaries that are 0.5 millimeters long. The flowers have slender, cylindrical styles that are 1.5 millimeters long that dilate into a broad, angular, egg-shaped stigma that is 0.5 by 1–1.5 millimeters. Its fruit occur in pairs positioned at 45° angles. The narrow, smooth, elliptical fruit are 6.5–8 by 2.3–2.5 centimeters. The young fruit are glossy and green, but become pale yellow and wrinkled with age. The upper surface of the fruit have a longitudinal groove. Its oblong, egg-shaped, flattened, yellow to brown seeds are 10–13 by 3–5 millimeters. The seeds are concave on one side and convex on the other, finely wrinkled with a dark central ridge. The margins of the seeds are jagged. The seeds are tufted with white hairs that are 2–3 centimeters long.

=== Reproductive biology ===
The pollen of Chlorocyathus lobulata is shed as permanent tetrads.

=== Distribution and habitat ===
It has been observed growing in scrub to riverine forests.
