= Buckollia =

Scientific classification
- Kingdom: Plantae
- Clade: Tracheophytes
- Clade: Angiosperms
- Clade: Eudicots
- Clade: Asterids
- Order: Gentianales
- Family: Apocynaceae
- Subfamily: Periplocoideae
- Genus: Buckollia; Venter & R.L. Verh.

Type species
- Buckollia volubilis (Schltr.) Venter & R.L.Verh.

Genus of flowering plants in the dogbane and oleander family Apocynaceae

Buckollia is a genus of plants in the Apocynaceae, first described in 1994. It is native to eastern Africa.

== Etymology ==
Buckollia is a taxonomic anagram derived from the name of the genus Bullockia. The latter name is a taxonomic patronym honoring the English botanist Arthur Allman Bullock.

== Systematics ==
According to The Plant List, there are two species in this genus.

1. Buckollia tomentosa (E.A.Bruce) Venter & R.L.Verh. - Uganda
2. Buckollia volubilis (Schltr.) Venter & R.L.Verh. - Ethiopia, Kenya, Tanzania
