= Joachim John Monteiro =

British mining engineer, explorer (1833 - 1878)

Joachim John Monteiro (1833-1878) was a British mining engineer, colonial administrator, naturalist and explorer.

Monteiro was born in London. He was trained at the Royal College of Mines in that city.

Monteiro went to Angola in 1858 to oversee mining enterprises in the Malachite deposits of Bembe, Angola and also the extraction of copper. While working there, he met with Pedro V of Kongo while he was visiting in the Portuguese colony. He remained in Angola until 1876. In Bembe Monteiro discovered that the fibres of the baobab could be used to make paper. Later when he moved to coastal Ambriz he attempted to create a commercial paper making enterprise there. He explored Angola widely making observations and records on its plants, birds and animals. For example, he sent several specimens of plants he recovered at Baía de Namibe to the Kew Gardens.

In 1875 Monteiro published a work entitled Angola and the River Congo.

In 1876 Monteiro relocated to Lourenco Marques (now Maputo) in Mozambique. Here he worked as a labor recruitment agent for the government of Cape Colony until his untimely death in 1878. After his death his wife Rose Monteiro engaged in many studies as a naturalist in the area where they had been living when he died.

== Sources ==
- 1878 article in Nature on Monteiro
- Biographical Database of Southern African Science entry on Monteiro
