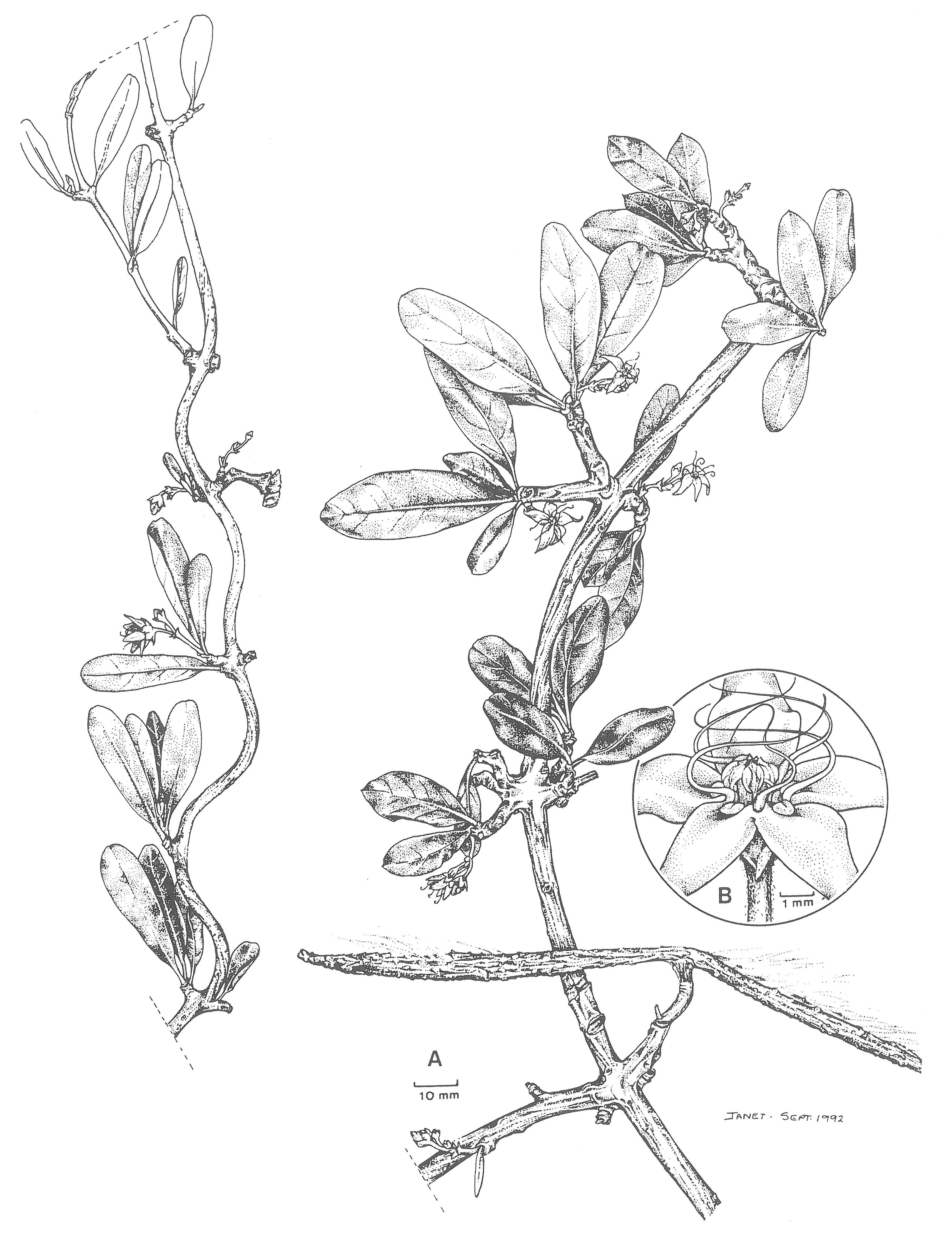
- Botanical illustration of Buckollia volubilis

Scientific classification
- Kingdom: Plantae
- Clade: Tracheophytes
- Clade: Angiosperms
- Clade: Eudicots
- Clade: Asterids
- Order: Gentianales
- Family: Apocynaceae
- Genus: Buckollia
- Species: B. volubilis

Binomial name
- Buckollia volubilis (Schltr.) Venter & R.L.Verh.

Synonyms
- Curroria volubilis (Schltr.) Bullock; Raphionacme volubilis Schltr.; Tacazzea volubilis (Schltr.) N.E.Br.

= Buckollia volubilis =

Species of flowering plant

Buckollia volubilis is a species of plant in the Apocynaceae family. It is native to the Ethiopia, Kenya, Somalia, Tanzania and Uganda. Rudolf Schlechter, the botanist who first formally described the species, named it after its twining (volubilis in Latin) growth habit, using the synonymous name Raphionacme volubilis.

== Description ==
It is a woody climbing plant reaching 3–4 meters in height. It has tuberous roots. Its greyish-brown, densely warty stems and branches are covered in fine, soft hairs when young but become hairless with age. The stems are up to 10 millimeters in diameter. The leaves occur in clusters or opposite one another on the stem. The egg-shaped leaves are 35–65 by 7–24 millimeters with the broader part of the blade toward the tips. The leaves are covered in fine, soft hairs and can have wavy margins. The tips of the leaves are variable and can be pointed, blunt or notched. The bases of the leaves are wedge-shaped. Its petioles are 1–3 millimeters long and covered in fine to wooly hairs. Its Inflorescences slightly to densely covered in white, wooly hairs with peduncles that are 2–8 millimeters long, and pedicels that are 1–2 millimeters long. The pedicels have narrow, triangular bracts that are 1 millimeter long. Its aromatic flowers have 5 egg-shaped, maroon sepals that are 1.5–2 by 1.5–2 millimeters, covered in white, wooly hairs on their outer surface, and have pointed tips. Its 5 hairless petals are fused at the base forming 0.8–1.2 millimeter long tube. The triangular to egg-shaped, green to yellow-green lobes of the petals are 5–7 by 2–3 millimeters. The tips of the petals are pointed to blunt. The petals have dull red-brown, globe-shaped glandular swellings at their base. The flowers have a structure between the petals and the stamens called a corona. Its corona has thread-like lobes that are 4–9 millimeters long and radially aligned with the sepals. The coronal lobes are pink with yellow-brown bases. The flowers have 5 stamen with anthers that are 1–1.5 by 0.7 millimeters and filaments that are 1 millimeters long. The pistils have column-shaped styles that are 1 millimeter long, and blunt to concave stigma that are 1.5 millimeters long. Each stigma bears a structure called a pollen translator. The elliptical pollen translators have hemispherical bases that are covered in a sticky surface. The grey-brown fruit are densely covered in warty protrusions and are 145–190 by 6–8 millimeters. The smooth seeds are 5–7 by 2 millimeters and tufted with white hairs that are 25–30 millimeter long.

=== Reproductive biology ===
The pollen of Buckollia volubilis is shed as permanent tetrads.

=== Distribution and habitat ===
It has been observed growing in moderately wet to arid savannahs at elevations of 400 to 1300 meters.

== Uses ==
It has been reported as being used as a wild edible plant in Hamer and Konso communities in Ethiopia, and as a medicinal plant in Nandi communities in Kenya.
